= Toranomon Hills =

Skyscraper complex in Tokyo, Japan

- 虎ノ門ヒルズ

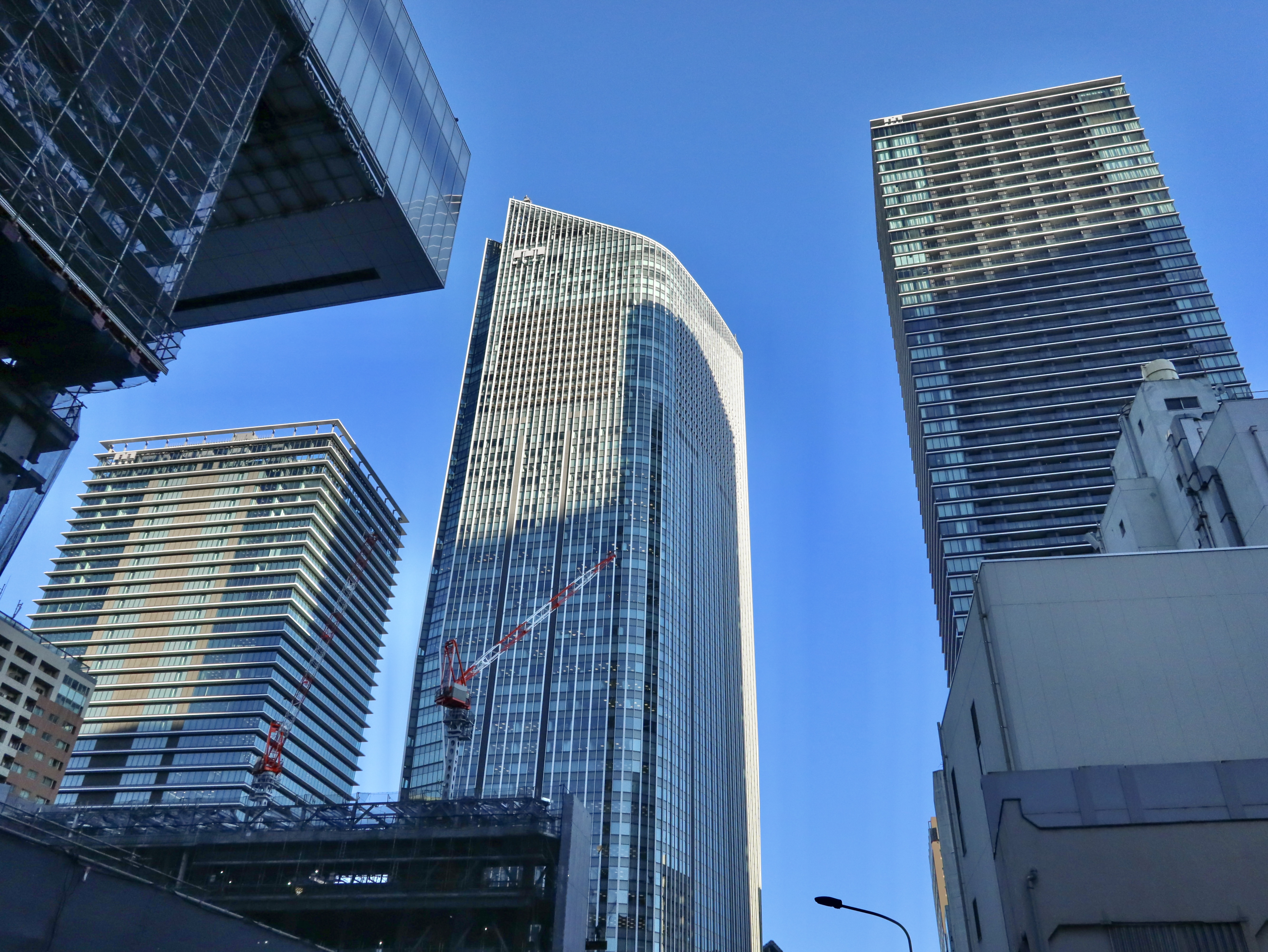
- From left to right: Business Tower, Mori Tower and Residential Tower. The structure on the upper left is the Station Tower under construction.
- Hotel chain: Hyatt

General information
- Status: Completed
- Type: Mixed-use, High Rise
- Location: Toranomon, Minato, Tokyo, Japan
- Coordinates: 35°40′1″N 139°44′58″E
- Construction started: April 2011; 15 years ago
- Completed: October 2023; 3 years ago
- Cost: ¥640 billion ($5.3 billion)
- Owner: Mori Building
- Operator: Mori Building

Height
- Height: Station Tower: 266 m (873 ft)
- Architectural: 266 m (873 ft) (Station Tower); 255 m (837 ft) (Mori Tower); 222 m (728 ft) (Residential Tower); 185 m (607 ft) (Business Tower)
- Roof: 266 m (873 ft) (Station Tower)

Technical details
- Floor count: 52 (Mori Tower); 36 (Business Tower); 54 (Residential Tower); 49 (Station Tower)
- Floor area: Total: 792,000 m^{2} (8,530,000 sq ft) Mori Tower: 244,360 m^{2} (2,630,300 sq ft) Business Tower:172,925 m^{2} (1,861,350 sq ft) Station Tower: 253,540 m^{2} (2,729,100 sq ft) Residential Tower: 121,000 m^{2} (1,300,000 sq ft)
- Grounds: 7.5 hectares (19 acres)

Design and construction
- Architecture firm: General Site Master Plan: Ingenhoven Associates and Nihon Sekkei; Station Tower only: OMA/Shohei Shigematsu; Andaz Tokyo Toranomon Hills only: tonychi and associates and SIMPLICITY, Tokyo; Hotel Toranomon Hills, The Unbound Collection only: Space Copenhagen
- Developer: Mori Building
- Main contractor: Obayashi Corporation (Mori Tower and Business Tower); Takenaka Corporation (Residential Tower); Kajima Corporation (Station Tower)

Other information
- Number of rooms: 369 total rooms Andaz Tokyo Toranomon Hills : 164 rooms Hotel Toranomon Hills, The Unbound Collection : 205 rooms
- Public transit: Toranomon Hills Station; Toranomon Station; Tokyo BRT Toranomon Hills Station; Keisei Bus Toranomon Hills Station

Toranomon Hills (虎ノ門ヒルズ, Toranomon Hiruzu) is a mixed-use skyscraper complex built and developed by Mori Building in the Toranomon district of Minato, Tokyo, Japan. The complex was designed by Germany-based architectural firm Ingenhoven Associates (Business Tower and Residential Tower, 2023) and the local architectural firm Nihon Sekkei (Mori Tower, 2014). The development is located around the new Loop Road No. 2, a surface artery that connects the Shinbashi and Toranomon districts, and also has close proximity to other Mori Tower development complexes, such as the Azabudai Hills from the southwest and the Ark Hills from the west. The development is connected to the Toranomon Hills Station of the Hibiya Line and the Toranomon Hills Bus Stop of the Tokyo BRT system, while also having a close distance to the Toranomon Station of the Ginza Line. Other bus terminals near the complex are the Nishi-Shinbashi 2-chome bus stop of the Tokyu Bus Route 東98 bound for Tokyo Station and Todoroki and the Shiba Route of the Chii Bus system bound for Shinbashi and Shibaura.

== History ==
Plans had existed since 1946 to build a new arterial road between Toranomon and Shimbashi as part of a loop road around central Tokyo. The Toranomon segment was popularly referred to as the "MacArthur Road", after General Douglas MacArthur, who served as the Supreme Commander for the Allied Powers in Japan following World War II, making reference to the proximity of the United States Embassy compound in nearby Akasaka. The plan remained unrealized for decades due to the government's inability to expropriate the necessary prime real estate in central Tokyo. A solution was finalized around 1989, which involved building a new skyscraper above the road and offering to relocate displaced residents into the building.

The project's provisional name was Loop Line No. 2 Shimbashi/Toranomon Redevelopment Project Building III (環状二号線新橋・虎ノ門地区第2種市街地再開発事業III街区). Mori Building formally announced the Toranomon Hills name on March 1, 2013.

The first building of the complex to be completed was the Toranomon Hills Mori Tower, which opened in 2014. The Business Tower was finished in 2020, while the Residential Tower was completed in 2022. The last of the four skyscrapers, Station Tower, was completed in 2023.

== Complex ==
The complex features four buildings: Toranomon Hills Station Tower (266 m (873 ft)), Toranomon Hills Mori Tower (255 m (837 ft)), Toranomon Hills Residential Tower (222 m (728 ft)) and Toranomon Hills Business Tower (185 m (607 ft)).

The project has a logo made of four black vertical bars forming a letter "M" (and also resembling the "門" kanji of the Toranomon name). It also has a mascot called Toranomon (トラのもん), which is developed by Fujiko Pro, the company who owns the rights to the Japanese manga character Doraemon.

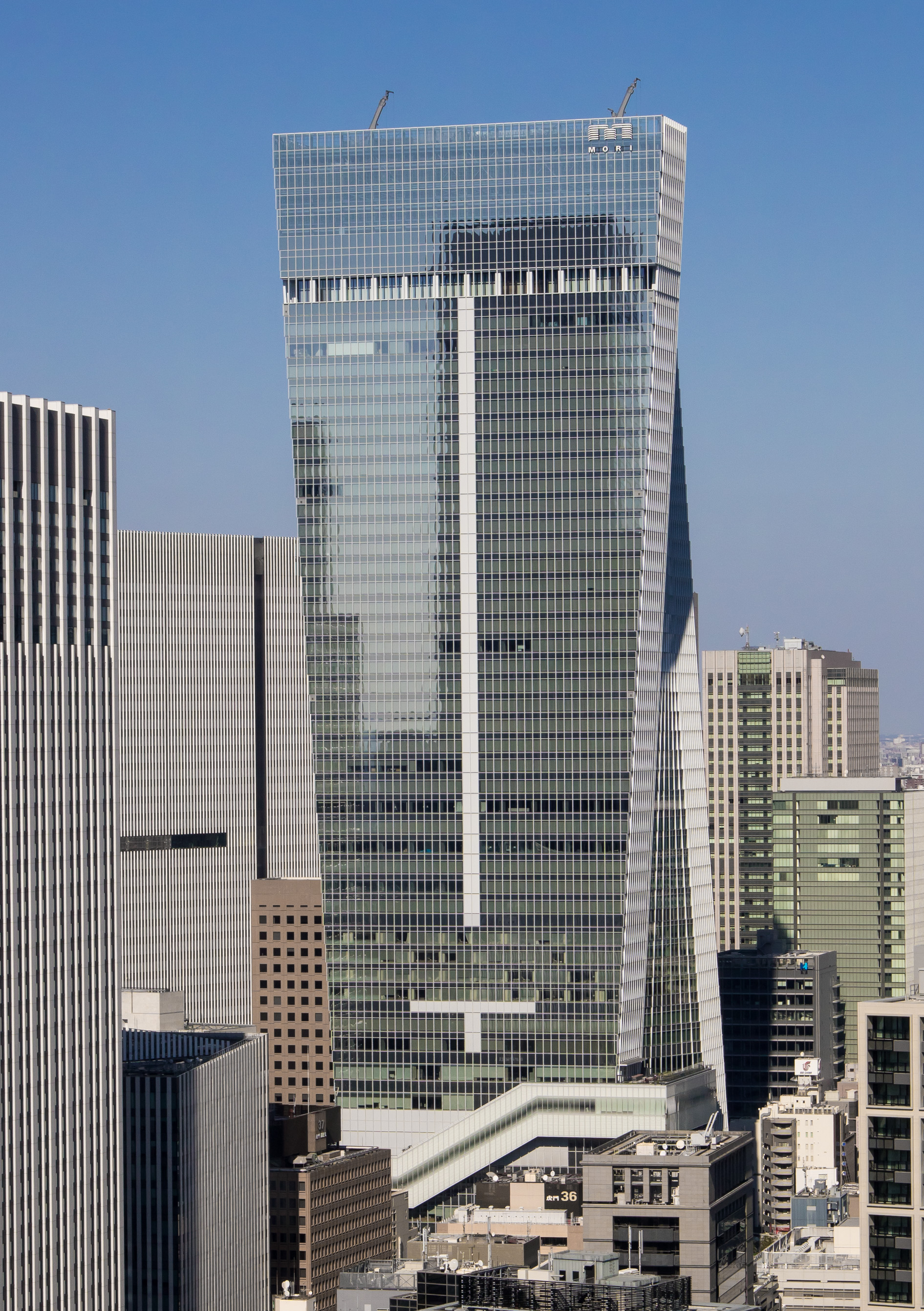
Toranomon Hills Station Tower

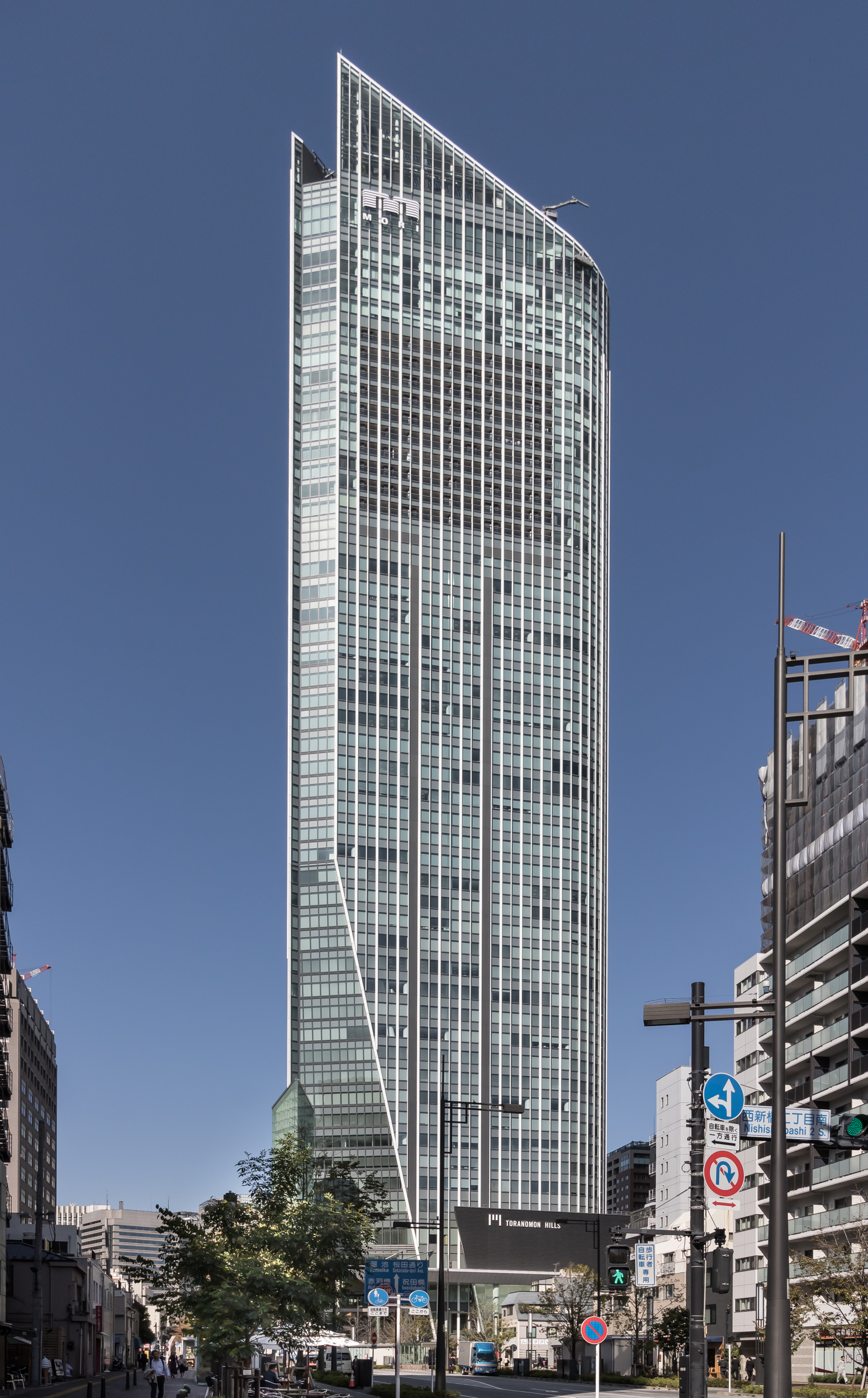
Toranomon Hills Mori Tower

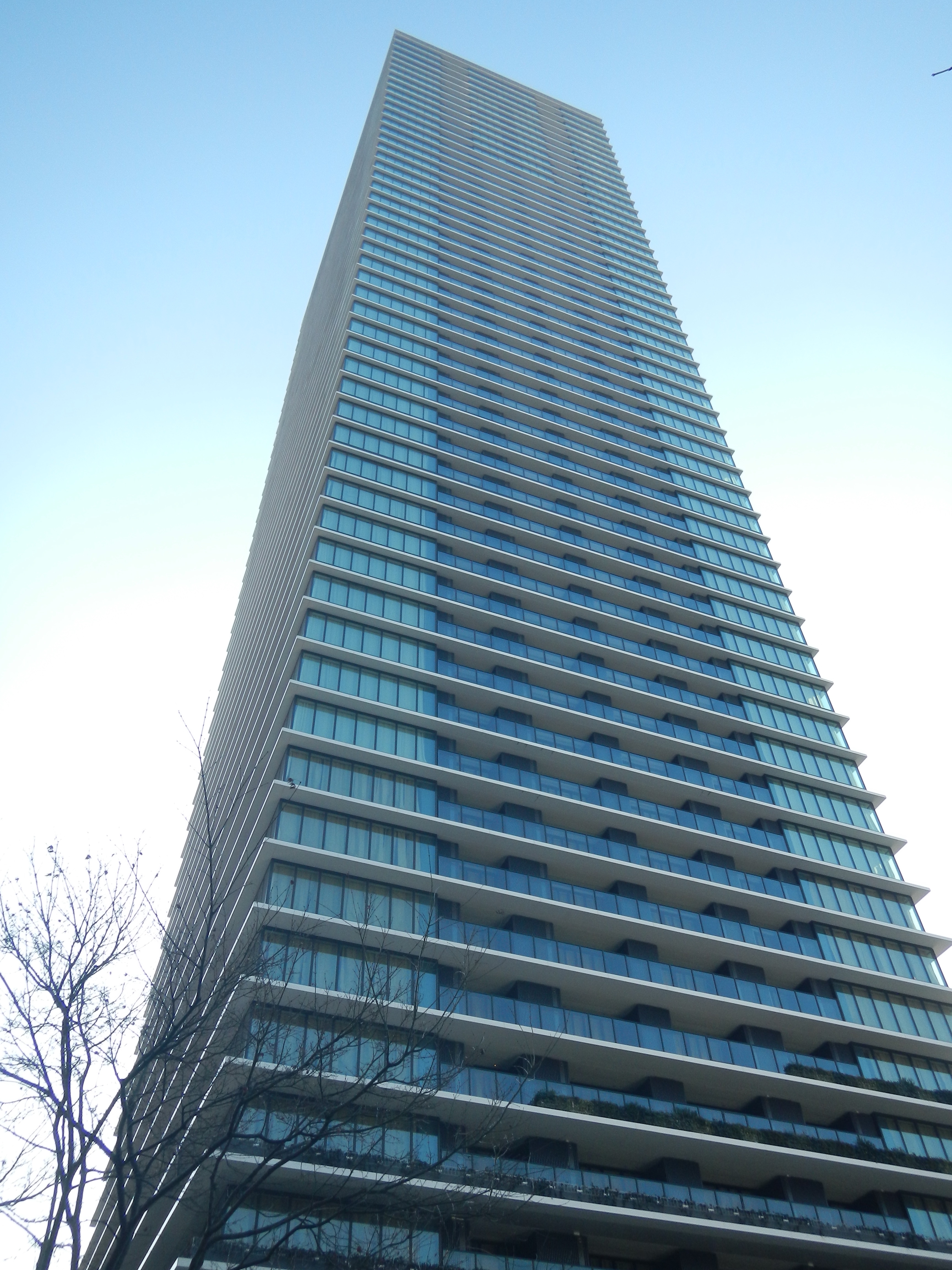
Toranomon Hills Residential Tower

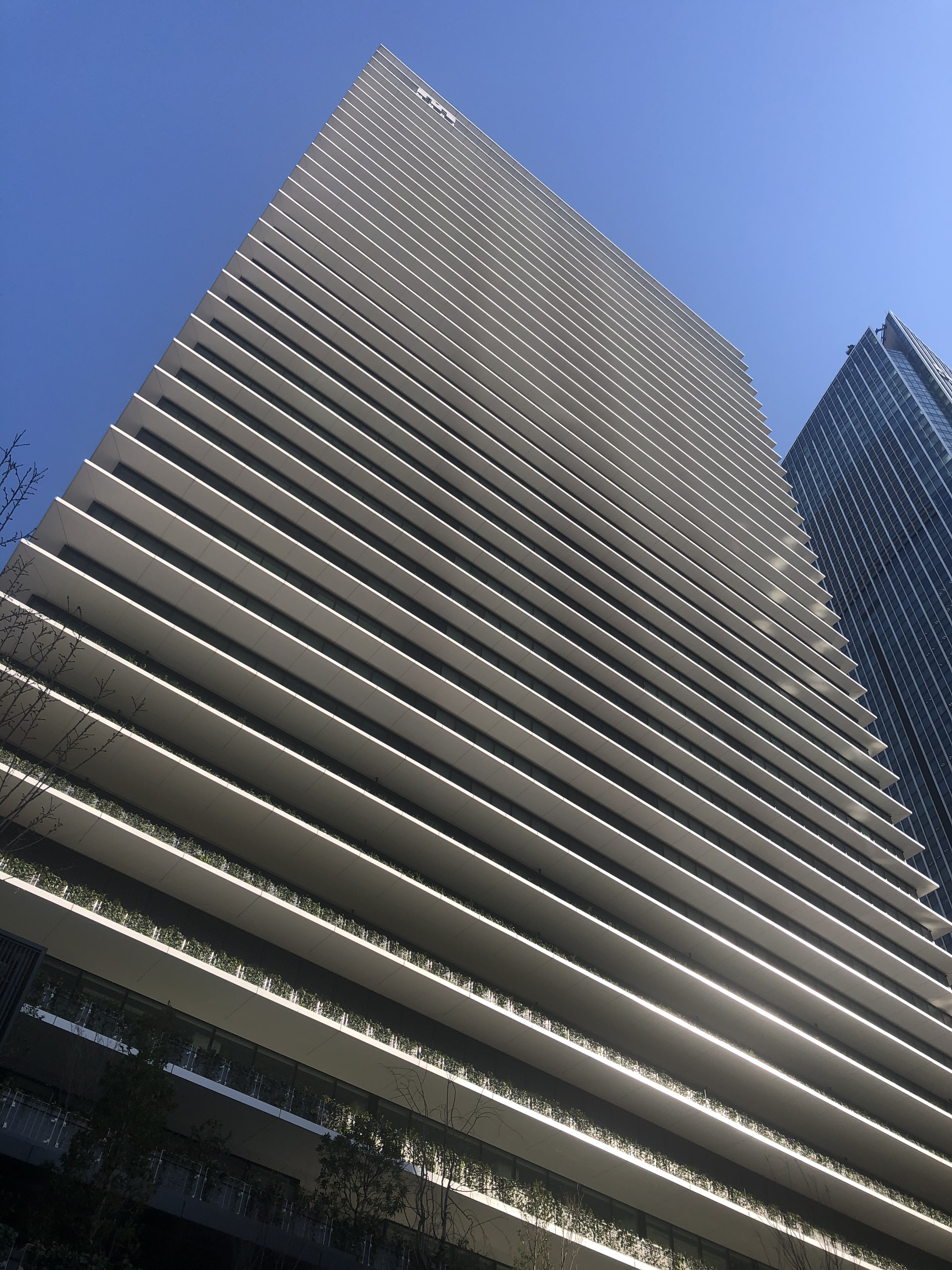
Toranomon Hills Business Tower

=== Mori Tower ===
Rising at 255 m (837 ft) and 52 stories high, the Mori Tower is the first tower to be completed within the complex. Construction of the tower began on April 1, 2011, and was completed in May 2014. The tower stands at a 9,391 m^{2} (101,080 sq ft) of land and has 244,360 m^{2} (2,630,300 sq ft) of total floor area. The mixed-use tower features pillarless office spaces, 24 shops and restaurants, 5 basement level parking spaces, and 6,000 m^{2} (65,000 sq ft) of green spaces around the tower, which includes the Oval Plaza. The tower also houses the Toranomon Hills Forum, a conference hall located at the 4th and 5th floor of the tower; the Toranomon Hills Residences, a luxury condominium complex which occupies the 37th to 46th floors of the tower and has 172 units; and the Andaz Tokyo Toranomon Hills, a 5-star hotel. The tower is also connected to the Glass Rock and the Station Tower through the T-Deck elevated pedestrian bridge.

The tower is also home to various local and foreign companies and organizations such as the Government Pension Investment Fund, the world's largest retirement fund, which has its headquarters on the 7th floor of Toranomon Hills Mori Tower, while the law firm of K&L Gates has its Tokyo office on the 28th floor and ArcelorMittal's is located on the 6th floor. The Japan headquarters of Novartis, Tencent, and State Street Corporation are also located in the Tower.

=== Business Tower ===
The Business Tower is the second tower to be completed within the complex. The office tower serves as the shortest tower of the complex as the tower stands at a height of 185 m (607 ft) and has 36 floors excluding 3 basement parking levels. Construction for the tower began in February 2017 and was completed in January 2020. The tower stands at 8,465 m^{2} (91,120 sq ft) of land and has 172,925 m^{2} (1,861,350 sq ft) of total floor area, which includes 96,000 m^{2} (1,030,000 sq ft) of office space from the 5th floor to the 36th floor. The tower also features retail stores and restaurants at the first three floors; the Toranomon Yokocho, a Japanese food lobby located at the 3rd floor with 26 different restaurants; the ARCH Toranomon Hills Incubation Center, the world's first incubation center that caters businesses and entrepreneurs and features co-working spaces, meeting halls, office spaces, and a cafe and lounge; and the Toranomon Hills Bus Terminal at the ground floor, which offers bus services from the Tokyo BRT. The tower is also directly connected to the Toranomon Hills Station of the Hibiya Line and the Toranomon Station of the Ginza Line through underground walkways.

The Business Tower is occupied by a variety of both local and foreign-based companies, such as Meta Tokyo, ZS Tokyo on the 14th floor, angle Co., Ltd., Hitachi High Technologies Solutions, Japanese Dream Co., Ltd., Nishimatsu Construction Co., Ltd., SAN Sekkei Co., Ltd., Sumitomo Mitsui Asset Management on the 26th floor, and World Innovation Lab (WiL) Inc. at the 4th floor.

=== Residential Tower ===
The Residential Tower is the complex's luxury residential tower development and the third tower to be completed within the complex. Standing at 222 m (728 ft) and 54 floors high, the Residential Tower began construction in March 2016 and was completed in January 2022. The tower stands at approximately 4,000 m^{2} (43,000 sq ft) of land and has 121,000 m^{2} (1,300,000 sq ft) of total floor area. The tower hosts 547 residential units and features 4 basement parking levels, retail stores and restaurants at the first three floors, a childcare facility at the second floor, a private clinic in cooperation with Jikei University School of Medicine, 160 serviced apartments at the 4th floor to the 11th floors; a guest lounge known as the Guesthouse Living and Dining Lounge; the Guesthouse Guest Room; the HILLS SPA, a resident-only spa; the EtonHouse International Pre-School; and the Toranomon Hills Kitchen, an exclusive restaurant for both residents and private guests and features fresh local ingredients. The exteriors of the tower is designed to blend with the adjacent Mori Tower and the Business Tower while the interiors features contemporary Japanese aesthetical designs. The tower also features a variety of exclusive artworks from the Mori Art Museum and green open spaces with direct connections to the adjacent Atago Shrine, which includes vartical terraces and side planters within the tower's facade.

=== Station Tower ===
The Station Tower is the fourth and final tower to rise within the complex. The tower stands at 266 m (873 ft), making it the tallest tower within the complex and has a total of 49 floors and 4 basement levels, which includes 2 basement retail levels. The tower rises at a land area of 10,730 m^{2} (115,500 sq ft) and has a total floor area of 253,540 m^{2} (2,729,100 sq ft), which includes 14,400 m^{2} (155,000 sq ft) of retail space. Construction for the tower began in November 2019 and was fully completed on October 6, 2023. The mixed-use tower has office spaces at the 9th to 11th floors and from the 15th floor to the 44th floor, and features the Station Atrium, a 2,000 m^{2} (22,000 sq ft), three-storey atrium which highlights its design that emphasizes natural light and offers direct connections to the tower's retail lobby and to the Toranomon Hills Station. The tower's retail lobby consists of various retail shops and restaurants spread across nine floors from the basement 2 level to the 7th level of the tower. The retail lobby also includes the T-Market, a Japanese-themed food hall located at the basement 2 level and offers 27 shops and restaurants. The tower also features a gallery and members lounge at the basement 1 floor, the partners lounge at the 4th floor and the sky lobby at the 7th floor with 1,200 m^{2} (13,000 sq ft) of floor area and 10 meter high ceilings. Office tenants in the tower include Activarch Consulting, Goldman Sachs Asset Management, and Japan Business Systems Inc. The tower is also connected to the adjacent Glass Rock and the Oval Plaza of the Mori Tower through the T-Deck elevated pedestrian bridge.

The Tokyo Node is a 10,000 m^{2} (110,000 sq ft) multipurpose events venue located at the 8th floor and from the 45th to 49th floor of the tower. The Tokyo Node also features the Tokyo Node Gallery at the 45th floor, the Tokyo Node Hall at the 46th floor, and the open-air sky garden and infinity pool at the 49th floor for various private events. The Tokyo Node also includes four restaurants and other amenities, namely the Tokyo Node Cafe and Tokyo Node Lab and studio halls at the 8th floor; the Tokyo Node Dining all-day dining restaurant at the 45th floor; the apothéose, a 3-consecutive (2024, 2025, and 2026) 1 star Michelin Guide-awarded restaurant featuring French cuisine with Japanese ingredients; and the KEI Collection PARIS, a grill restaurant featuring French cuisine in collaboration with Japanese chef Kei Kobayashi. Both the apothéose and KEI Collection PARIS are located at the 49th floor of the tower.

=== Glass Rock ===
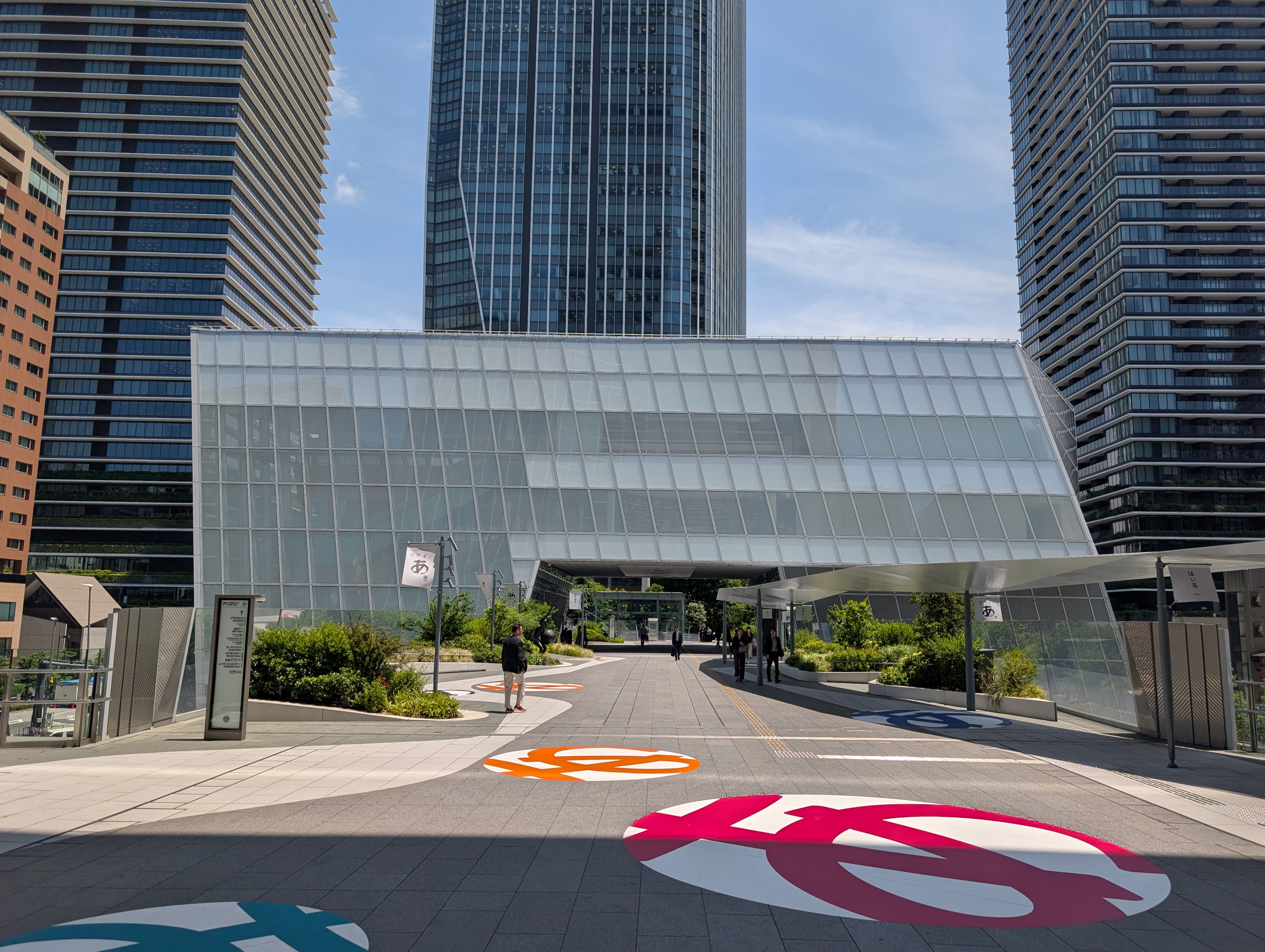
The Glass Rock taken from the T-Deck close to the Station Tower

The Toranomon Hills Glass Rock is a commercial building located in between the Mori Tower and the Station Tower and serves as the final component of the development. The 30 m (98 ft) high building was completed on August 29, 2024, before opening its doors on April 9, 2025, and consists of roughly 7 retail shops and restaurants spread out across four aboveground levels and thee basement levels. The mall has 8,800 m^{2} (95,000 sq ft) of floor area and features an geometric angular prism design enclosed in an all-glass facade. The building also expanded the overall shops within the complex to a total of 170 establishments and 26,000 m^{2} (280,000 sq ft) of total retail space. The building also hosts the Glass Rock - Social Action Community, a multipurpose membership events place located at the 4th floor and the basement 1 level of the building. The building is also connected by the T-Deck elevated pedestrian bridge at the 2nd floor, giving the building direct connection to the Station Tower and the Oval Plaza of the Mori Tower.

=== Toranomon Hills Edomizaka Terrace ===
Known as the A-3 district project, the Toranomon Hills Edomizaka Terrace is a 12-storey mixed-use building located across the Station Tower. The 59 m (194 ft) building was completed in July 2023 and also opened its doors a few months later. The building has retail levels from the ground floor to the second floor, a basement parking, residential units at the 3rd floor to the 6th floor, and office spaces from the 7th floor to the 12th floor. The building's office tenants include Japan Institute of Invention and Innovation (JIII) at the 8th floor.

== Hotels ==
The complex currently houses two 5-star hotels located within the complex: the Andaz Tokyo Toranomon Hills and the Hotel Toranomon Hills. Both hotels are operated by American hospitality firm Hyatt. The hotels have a total combined number of 369 rooms, which includes 38 suites.

=== Andaz Tokyo Toranomon Hills ===
The Andaz Tokyo Toranomon Hills is a 5-star luxury hotel and occupies the 47th to 52nd floor of the Mori Tower. The hotel is operated under the Andaz brand of Hyatt Hotels Corporation, and serves as the first Andaz branded hotel in Japan and the twelfth Andaz-branded hotel to open worldwide. The hotel opened on June 11, 2014, and has a total of 164 rooms including 8 suites. The hotel's interiors were designed by Tony Chi of tonychi and associates and Shinichiro Ogata of SIMPLICITY, Tokyo, and features simple yet contemporary and natural Japanese aesthetics. Natural materials such as washi paper and walnut were used within the designs. The hotel also features meeting halls, a swimming pool, a spa known as the AO Spa & Club located at the 37th floor, a fitness center, and room services. The hotel also hosts 6 restaurants, namely; The Tavern - Grill and Lounge, which features European cuisine while using Japanese ingredients; BeBu, which caters American comfort food; the Rooftop Bar, a Katsura Imperial Villa-inspired rooftop bar with Japanese teahouse-inspired designs; the SUSHI, a 8-seater sushi restaurant which offers authentic and fresh sushi sourced across Japan; and the Pastry Shop, a 20-seater patisserie.

=== Hotel Toranomon Hills, The Unbound Collection ===
The Hotel Toranomon Hills, The Unbound Collection by Hyatt is a 5-star urban luxury hotel that occupies the 11th to 14th floor of the Station Tower. The hotel currently serves as the first hotel of The Unbound Collection brand of Hyatt Hotels Corporation to open in both Japan and worldwide. The hotel opened on December 6, 2025, and has a total of 205 rooms, which includes 30 suites. The hotel's interiors were designed by Danish architecture firm Space Copenhagen and features a mixture of modern Danish and Japanese aesthetics with minimalistic designs. The hotel features meeting halls, a fitness center, and a dedicated lounge known as The Lounge, located at the 11th floor, which has co-working spaces, resting spaces, shower rooms, and self-service lockers. The hotel also features the Le Pristine Tokyo, a casual dining restaurant and all-day patisserie in collaboration with Dutch chef Sergio Herman and offers Italian and European cuisine and was also awarded a 1 Michelin star in 2024 and was also included in the Michelin Guide in 2025.

== Gallery ==
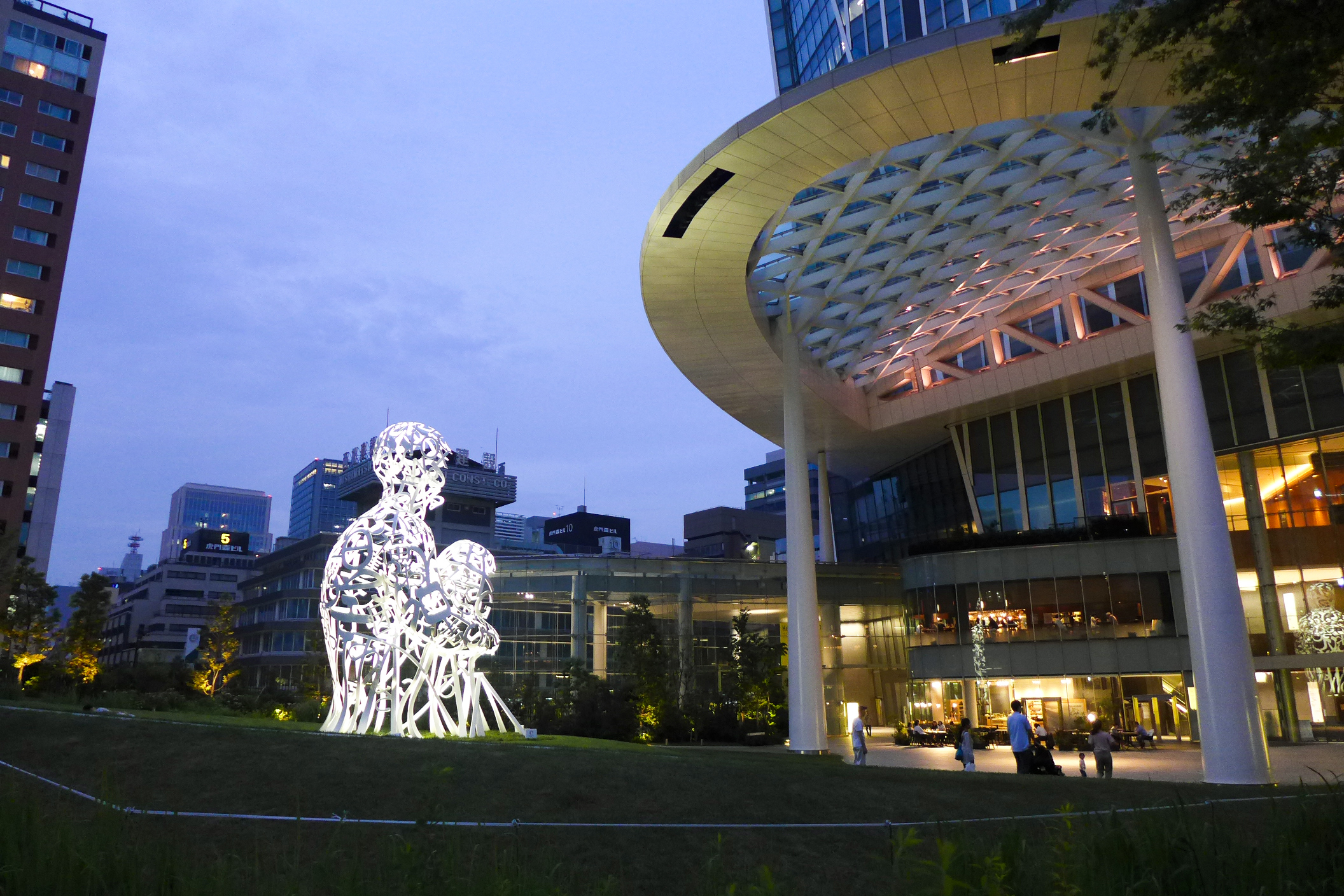
Oval Plaza

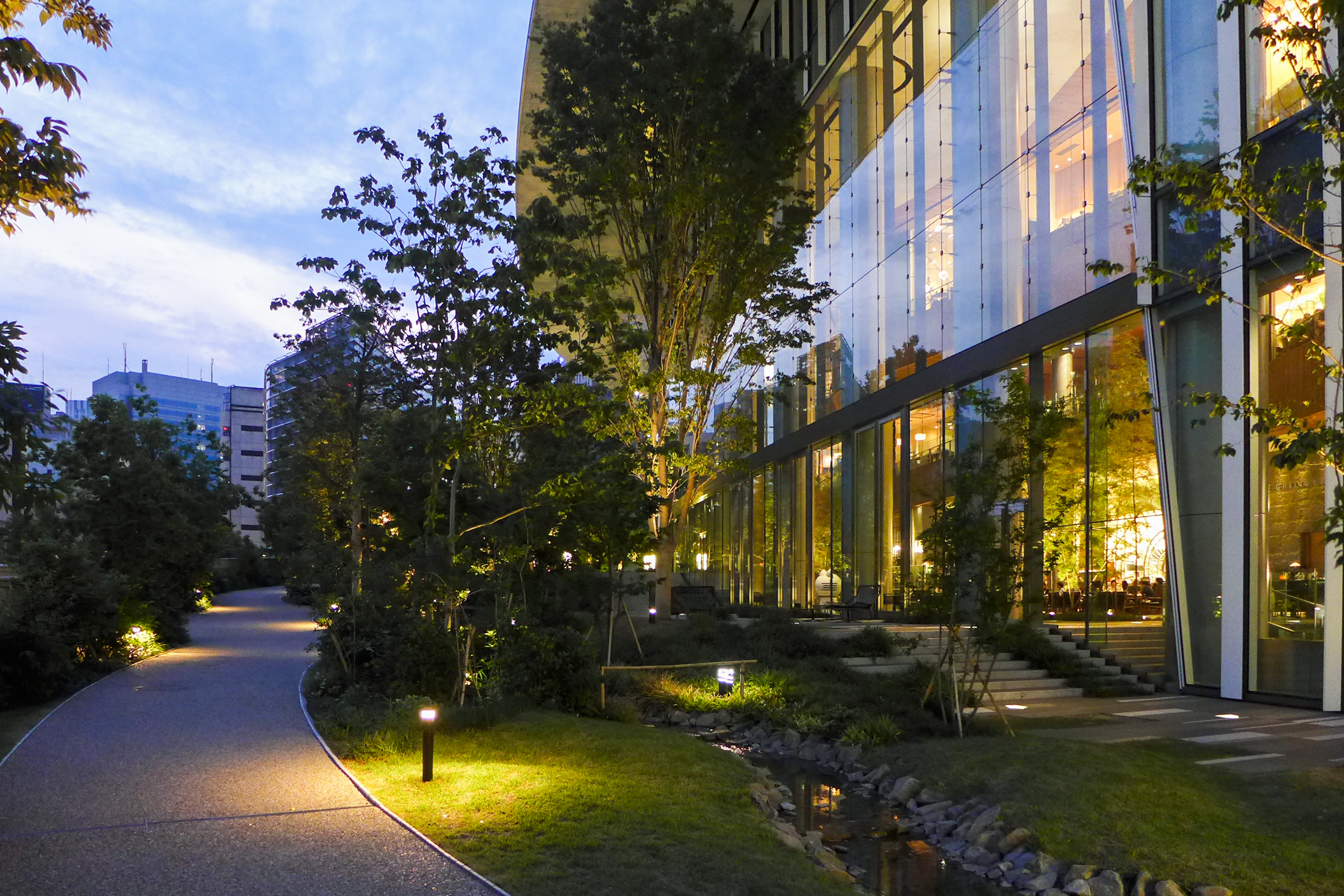
Step Garden

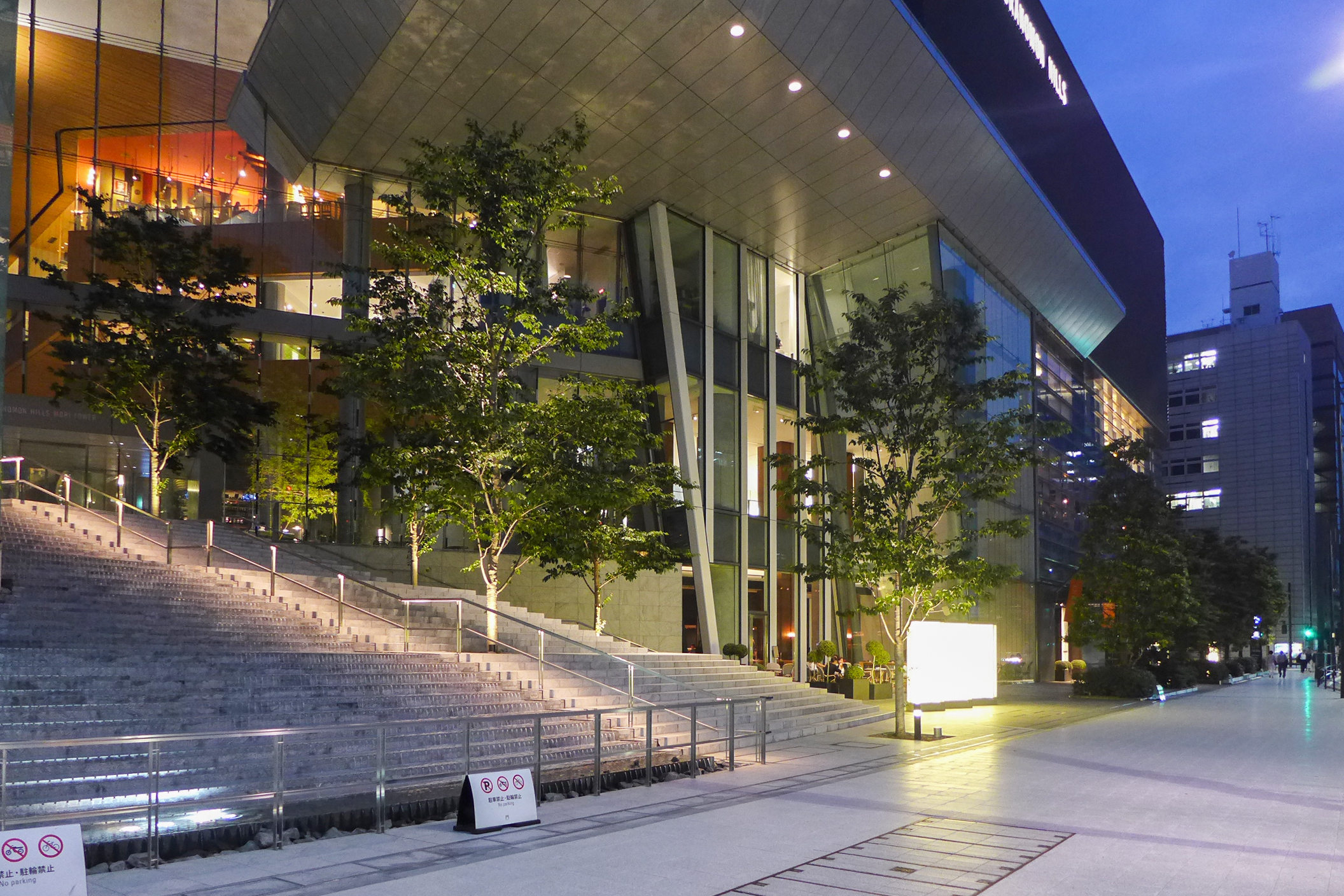
Shimbashi entrance

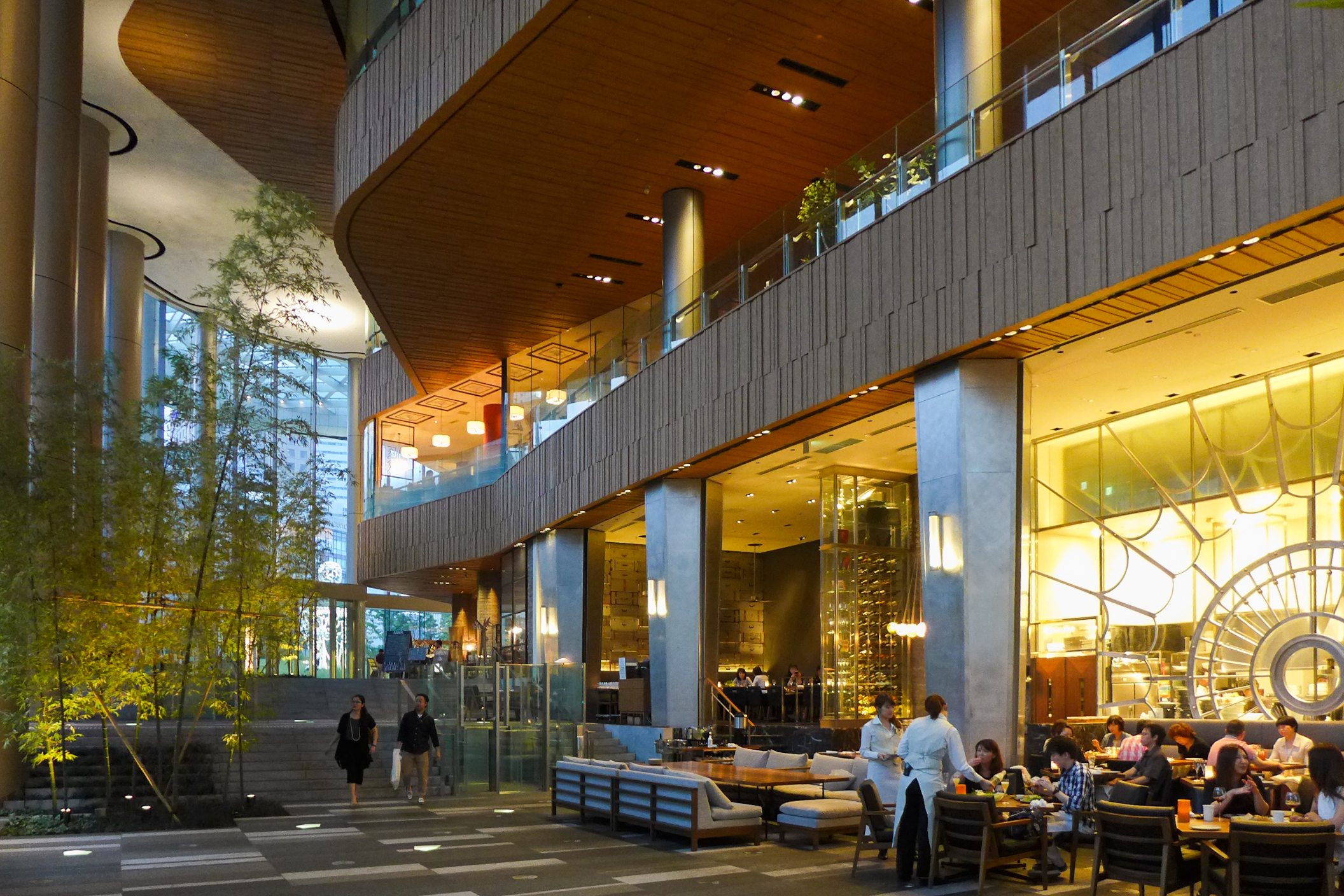
Mori Tower's Atrium

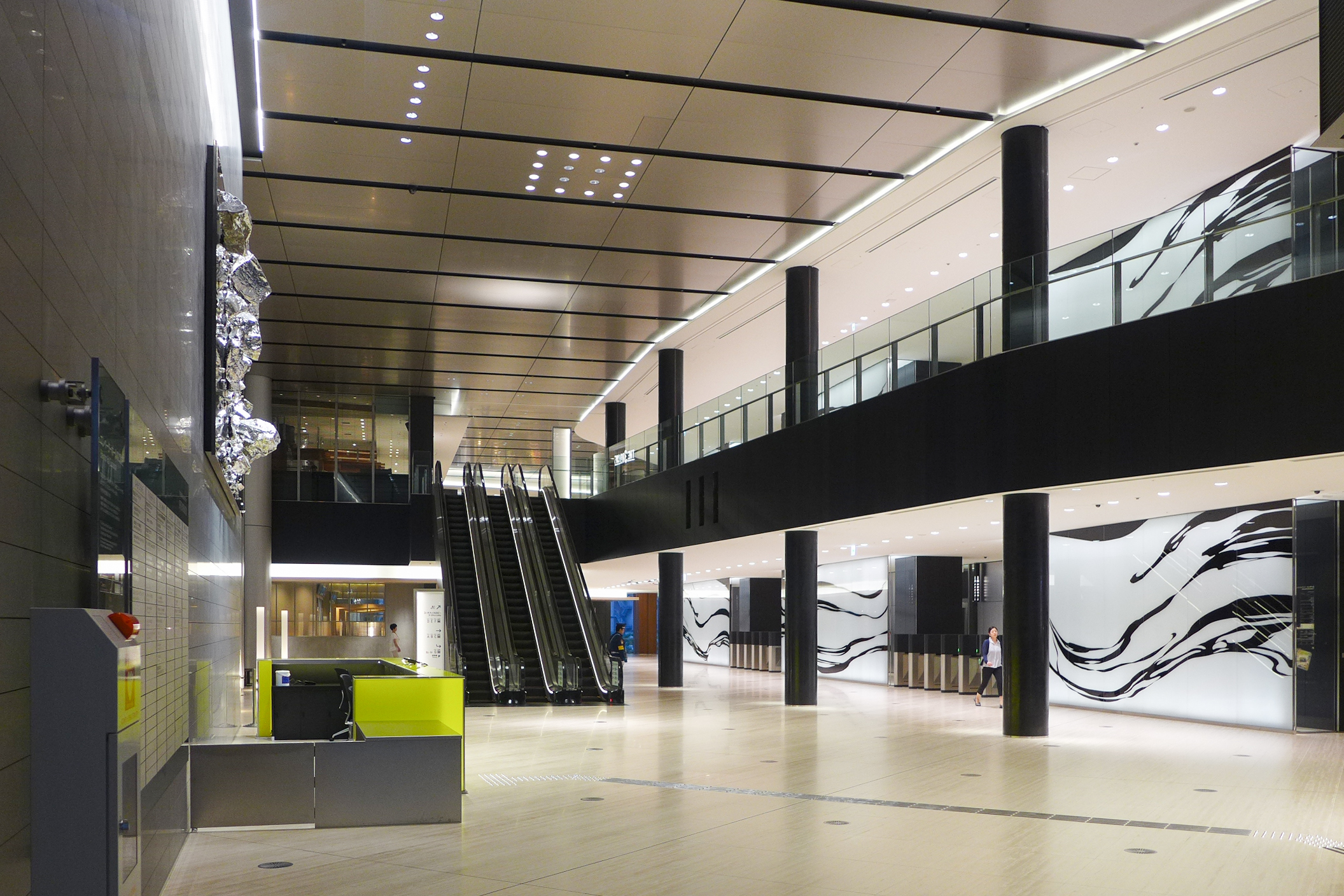
Mori Tower's office lobby

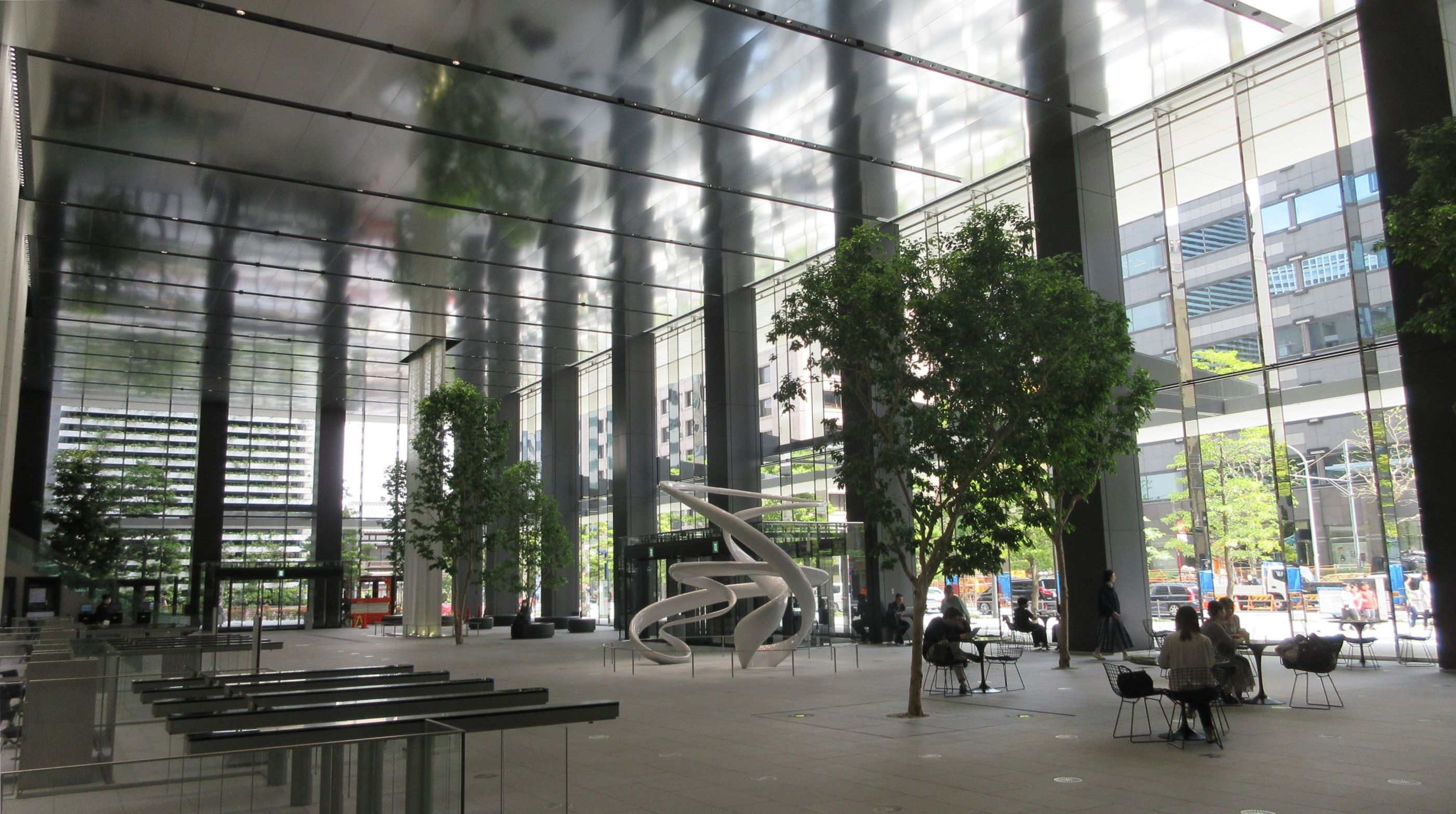
Business Tower's ground floor lobby

Records
Preceded by Midtown Tower	Tallest building in Tokyo; 2014–2023	Succeeded by Azabudai Hills Mori JP Tower
