= TH Liner =

Train service in Saitama, Japan

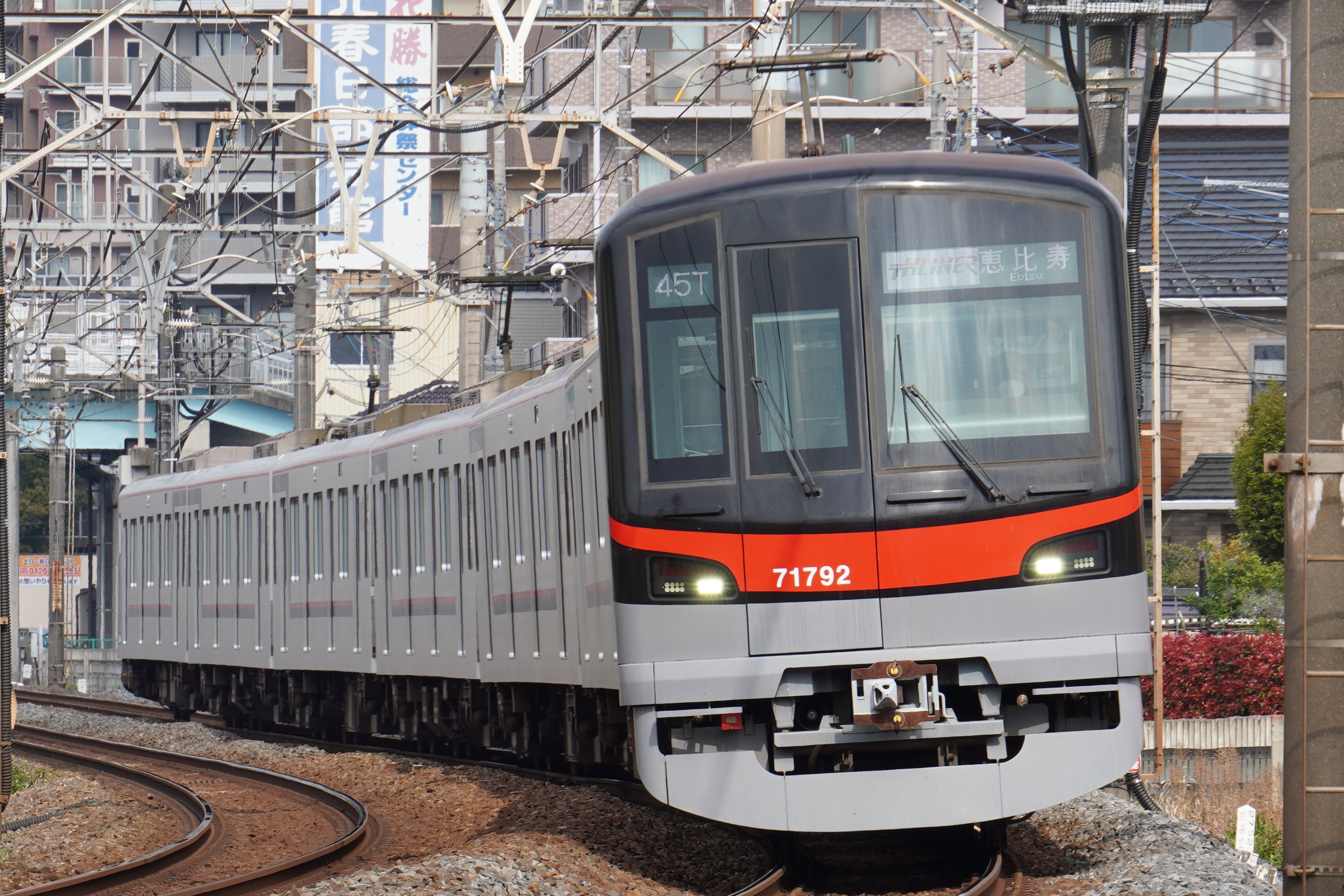
- Tobu 70090 series on a TH Liner service, April 2023

Overview
- Service type: Home Liner
- Status: Operational
- Locale: Kanto region, Japan
- First service: 6 June 2020
- Current operator: Tobu Railway

Route
- Termini: Kuki (up); Kasumigaseki (down); Ebisu (up); Kuki (down)
- Distance travelled: 59.9 km (37.2 mi)
- Average journey time: 1 hour 30 minutes (up); 1 hour 17 minutes (down)
- Service frequency: 2 (up), 5 (down)
- Lines used: Tobu Isesaki Line; Tobu Skytree Line; Tokyo Metro Hibiya Line

On-board services
- Class: Monoclass
- Seating arrangements: Forward facing 2+2
- Catering facilities: None
- Other facilities: No toilets

Technical
- Rolling stock: Tobu 70090 series EMUs
- Track gauge: 1,067 mm (3 ft 6 in)
- Electrification: 1,500 V DC overhead
- Operating speed: 100 km/h (60 mph)

The TH Liner (THライナー) is a limited-stop "Home Liner"-style service to and from Kuki Station in Saitama on the Tobu Isesaki Line operated by the private railway operator Tobu Railway in Japan since June 2020.

== Service outline ==
TH Liner services operate in the mornings on weekdays and weekends in the "up" direction (two services) from Kuki in Saitama Prefecture to Ebisu in Tokyo, and in the evenings (weekdays and weekends) in the "down" direction (five services) from Kasumigaseki to Kuki. In the up direction, a supplement of 580 yen (300 yen for children) is required for travel between the serviced Hibiya Line stations and Sengendai station, and 680 yen (350 yen for children) beyond as far as Kuki station. No supplementary fare is required for passengers boarding the service between Kasumigaseki to Ebisu. All seats are reserved, and the supplementary tickets indicate which car to ride in.

== Rolling stock ==
TH Liner services are operated by a fleet of 70090 series 7-car electric multiple units (EMUs). Like their 50090 series counterparts, these sets are unusual in having rotating pairs of seats allowing them to be used with longitudinal seating on regular daytime services, and with transverse seating on TH Liner services.

== Station stops ==
Morning "Up" services start at Kuki and terminate at Ebisu. Evening "Down" services start at Kasumigaseki and terminate at Kuki. For the morning "up" services, the service only picks up passengers between Kuki and Shin-Koshigaya. Between Ueno and Ginza, passengers can only get off the train. Starting at Kasumigaseki, passengers may get on and off at any of the serviced Hibiya line stations until the terminus at Ebisu. For the evening "down" services, passengers can only get on the train at the Hibiya Line stations starting at Kasumigaseki. Starting at Shin-Koshigaya, passengers may only get off the train until the terminus at Kuki.

| Route | No. | Name | Japanese | Up | Down | Transfers | Location | |
|---|---|---|---|---|---|---|---|---|
| Tokyo Metro; Hibiya Line | H-02 | Ebisu | 恵比寿 | ◎ | | Yamanote Line; Saikyō Line; Shōnan-Shinjuku Line | Shibuya | Tokyo |
| Tokyo Metro; Hibiya Line | H-03 | Hiro-o | 広尾 | ● | | | Minato | Tokyo |
| Tokyo Metro; Hibiya Line | H-04 | Roppongi | 六本木 | ● | | Toei Oedo Line (E-23) | Minato | Tokyo |
| Tokyo Metro; Hibiya Line | H-05 | Kamiyachō | 神谷町 | ● | | | Minato | Tokyo |
| Tokyo Metro; Hibiya Line | H-06 | Toranomon Hills | 虎ノ門ヒルズ | ● | | Tokyo Metro Ginza Line (Toranomon: G-07) | Minato | Tokyo |
| Tokyo Metro; Hibiya Line | H-07 | Kasumigaseki | 霞ケ関 | ● | ○ | Tokyo Metro Marunouchi Line (M-15); Tokyo Metro Chiyoda Line (C-08) | Chiyoda | Tokyo |
| Tokyo Metro; Hibiya Line | H-09 | Ginza | 銀座 | ◎ | ○ | Tokyo Metro Ginza Line (G-09); Tokyo Metro Marunouchi Line (M-16); Tokyo Metro Yurakucho Line (Ginza-itchome: Y-19) | Chūō | Tokyo |
| Tokyo Metro; Hibiya Line | H-13 | Kayabachō | 茅場町 | ◎ | ○ | Tokyo Metro Tozai Line (T-11) | Chūō | Tokyo |
| Tokyo Metro; Hibiya Line | H-16 | Akihabara | 秋葉原 | ◎ | ○ | Yamanote Line; Keihin-Tōhoku Line; Chūō-Sōbu Line; ■ Tsukuba Express (01); Toei Shinjuku Line (Iwamotocho, S-08) | Chiyoda | Tokyo |
| Tokyo Metro; Hibiya Line | H-18 | Ueno | 上野 | ◎ | ○ | Tokyo Metro Ginza Line (G-16); Tōhoku Shinkansen; Yamagata Shinkansen; Akita Shinkansen; Hokkaidō Shinkansen; Jōetsu Shinkansen; Hokuriku Shinkansen; Yamanote Line; Keihin-Tōhoku Line; Tōhoku Main Line (Utsunomiya Line); Takasaki Line; Jōban Line (Rapid); Ueno-Tokyo Line; Keisei Main Line (Keisei Ueno: KS01) | Taitō | Tokyo |
| Tobu; Skytree Line | TS20 | Shin-Koshigaya | 新越谷 | ○ | ◎ | Musashino Line | Koshigaya | Saitama |
| Tobu; Skytree Line | TS24 | Sengendai | せんげん台 | ○ | ◎ | | Koshigaya | Saitama |
| Tobu; Skytree Line | TS27 | Kasukabe | 春日部 | ○ | ◎ | Tobu Urban Park Line (TD-10) | Kasukabe | Saitama |
| Tobu; Skytree Line | TS30 | Tōbu-Dōbutsu-Kōen | 東武動物公園 | ○ | ◎ | Tobu Nikko Line | Miyashiro | Saitama |
| Tobu; Isesaki Line | TI02 | Kuki | 久喜 | ○ | ◎ | Tōhoku Main Line (Utsunomiya Line) | Kuki | Saitama |

●: Stop, ○: Stop (only available for boarding), ◎: Stop (only available for getting off)

== History ==
=== 2019 ===
On 26 March 2019, the Tokyo Metro and private operator Tobu Railway revealed plans to operate a reserved-seat Home Liner service that would connect the Tobu Isesaki Line and the Hibiya Line. The rolling stock for this service would be a new variant of the 70000 series introduced in 2017. Later on 19 December, additional details were announced such as the name of the service, stopping pattern, and schedule.

=== 2020 ===
On 6 June 2020 the TH Liner began service.

== See also ==
- TJ Liner
- List of named passenger trains of Japan
