= Toranomon Hills Station =

Metro station in Tokyo, Japan

Toranomon Hills Station 虎ノ門ヒルズ駅

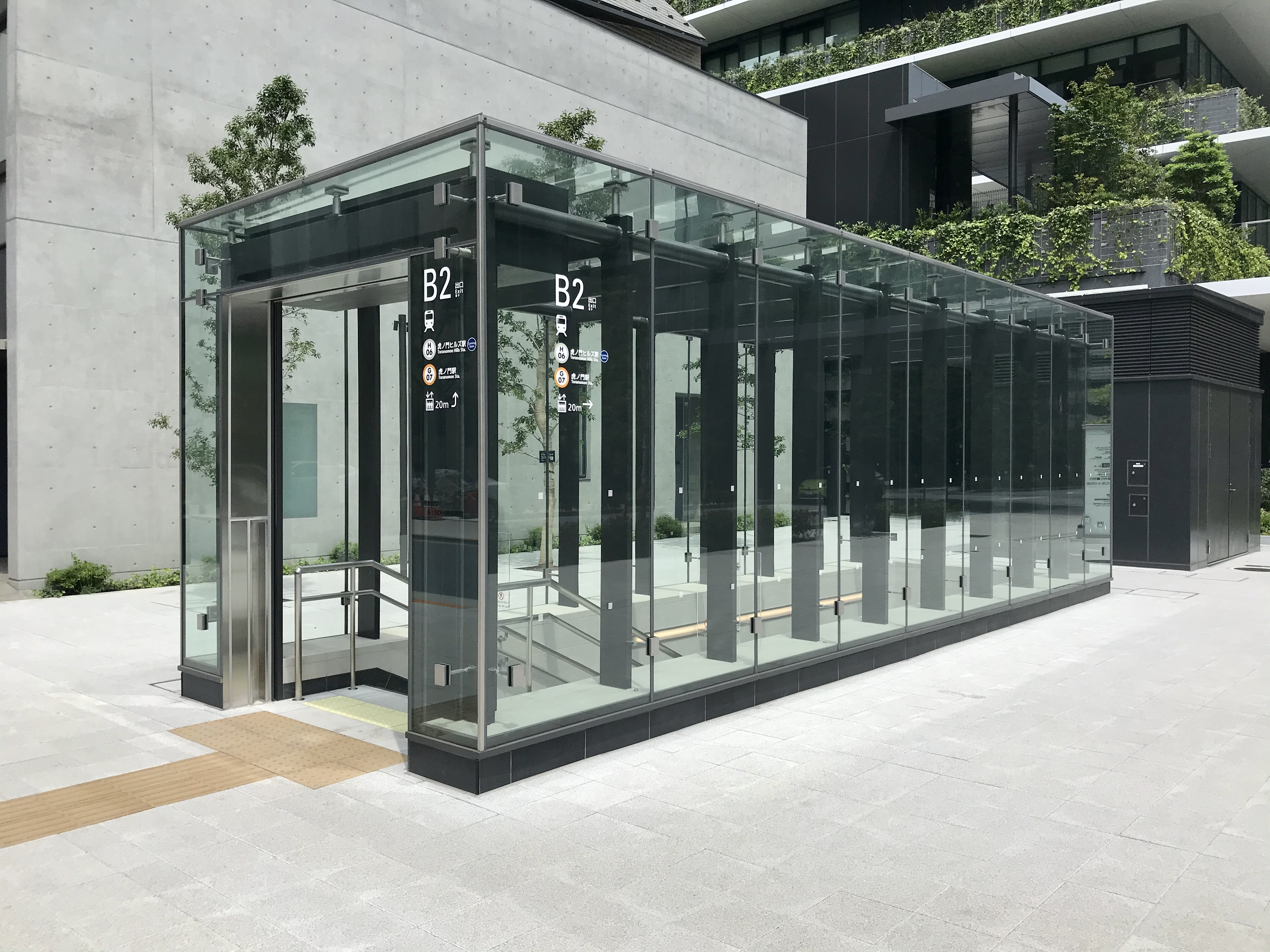
- B2 Exit in June 2020

General information
- Location: 22-12 Toranomon 1-chome, Minato-ku, Tokyo; Japan
- Coordinates: 35.667156°N 139.747657°E
- Operator: Tokyo Metro
- Line: Hibiya Line
- Platforms: 2 side platform
- Tracks: 2
- Connections: Toranomon

Construction
- Structure type: Underground

Other information
- Station code: H-06

History
- Opened: 6 June 2020; 6 years ago

Passengers
- 2020: 22,864

Services
Preceding station	Tokyo Metro	Following station
Kamiyachō towards Ebisu	TH Liner	Kasumigaseki One-way operation
Kamiyachō towards Naka-meguro	Hibiya Line	Kasumigaseki towards Kita-Senju
Location
- Location within Tokyo Yamanote Loop Location within Tokyo wards area Location within Japan

Toranomon Hills Station (虎ノ門ヒルズ駅, Toranomon Hiruzu eki) is a railway station in Minato, Tokyo, Japan. The station's official name was announced on 5 December 2018, before it opened on 6 June 2020. The station is operated by Tokyo Metro. The station number is H-06.

== Lines ==
This station is served by the Hibiya Line, which runs across Tokyo between Naka-Meguro in the southwest, to Kita-Senju in the northeast. Additionally, the Hibiya Line operates through services to the Tobu Skytree Line to Tōbu-Dōbutsu-Kōen or Minami-Kurihashi in the Saitama Prefecture.

The station connects to the nearby Toranomon Station on the Ginza Line, via a 7-minute walk in a connecting passageway.

== Station layout ==
1	Hibiya Line	for Roppongi, Ebisu, and Naka-meguro
2	Hibiya Line	for Ginza, Ueno, and Kita-senju; Tobu Skytree Line for Tōbu-Dōbutsu-Kōen and Minami-Kurihashi

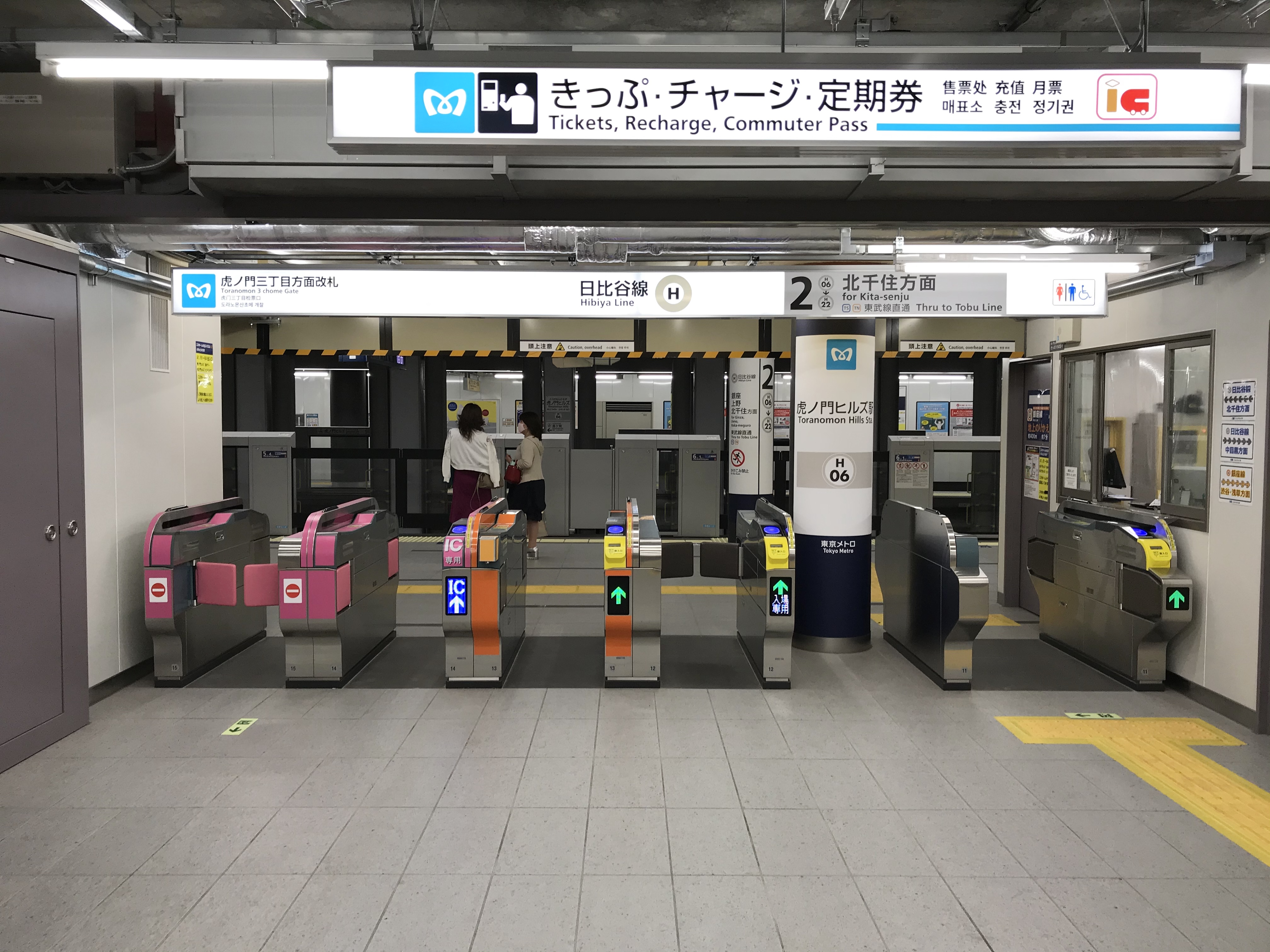
Ticket Gates (for Toranomon 3-chome exit)

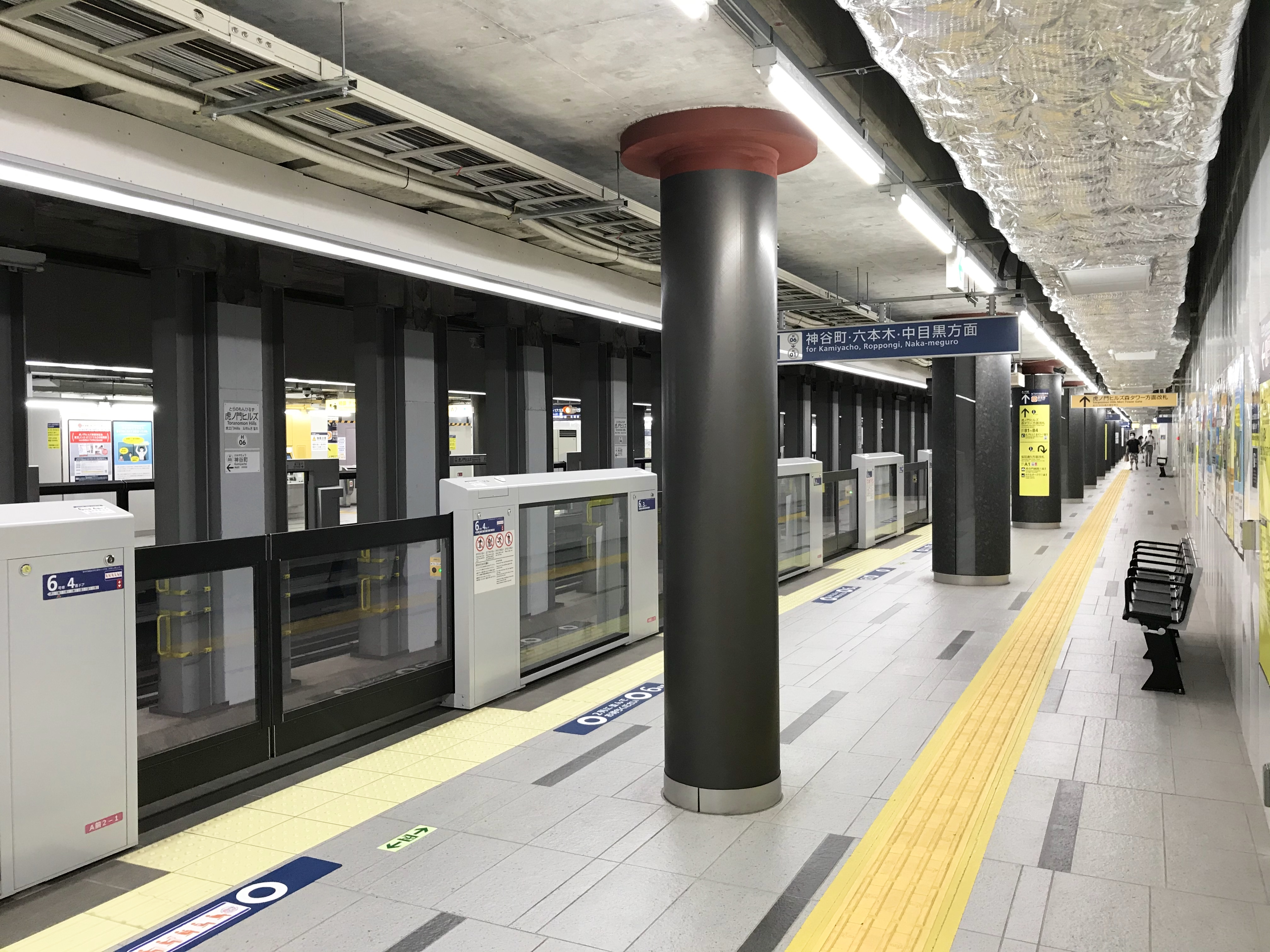
Platform for Naka-meguro (Temporary)

== History ==
Toranomon Hills Station was planned to be provisionally opened in time for the 2020 Summer Olympics, and will be fully opened by fiscal 2022.

The station opened on 6 June 2020, making it the newest station on the entire Tokyo subway network. Toranomon Hills Station adopted the station number H-06, previously used by Kasumigaseki Station. As a result, the station numbers for stations from Kasumigaseki to Kita-Senju were adjusted.

Toranomon Hills is the only Hibiya Line station built under the ownership of Tokyo Metro after the privatization of the Teito Rapid Transit Authority (TRTA) in 2004.

== Surrounding areas ==
The station is built directly under the Japan National Route 1 (Sakurada-dori section). It is west of the Toranomon Hills Mori Tower. At the two sides adjacent to the station will be two underground station plazas, which were built during the redevelopment for the Toranomon Hills.

The station is located on the west side of the Toranomon Hills commercial and residential complex which opened in June 2014, and will provide connections with a new bus and Tokyo BRT terminal also planned ahead of the 2020 Olympics.

== See also ==
- List of railway stations in Japan
- Toranomon Station, a connecting station nearby on the Ginza Line.
