= Kamiyachō Station =

Metro station in Tokyo, Japan

Coordinates: 35.662949°N 139.745007°E

Kamiyachō Station 神谷町駅

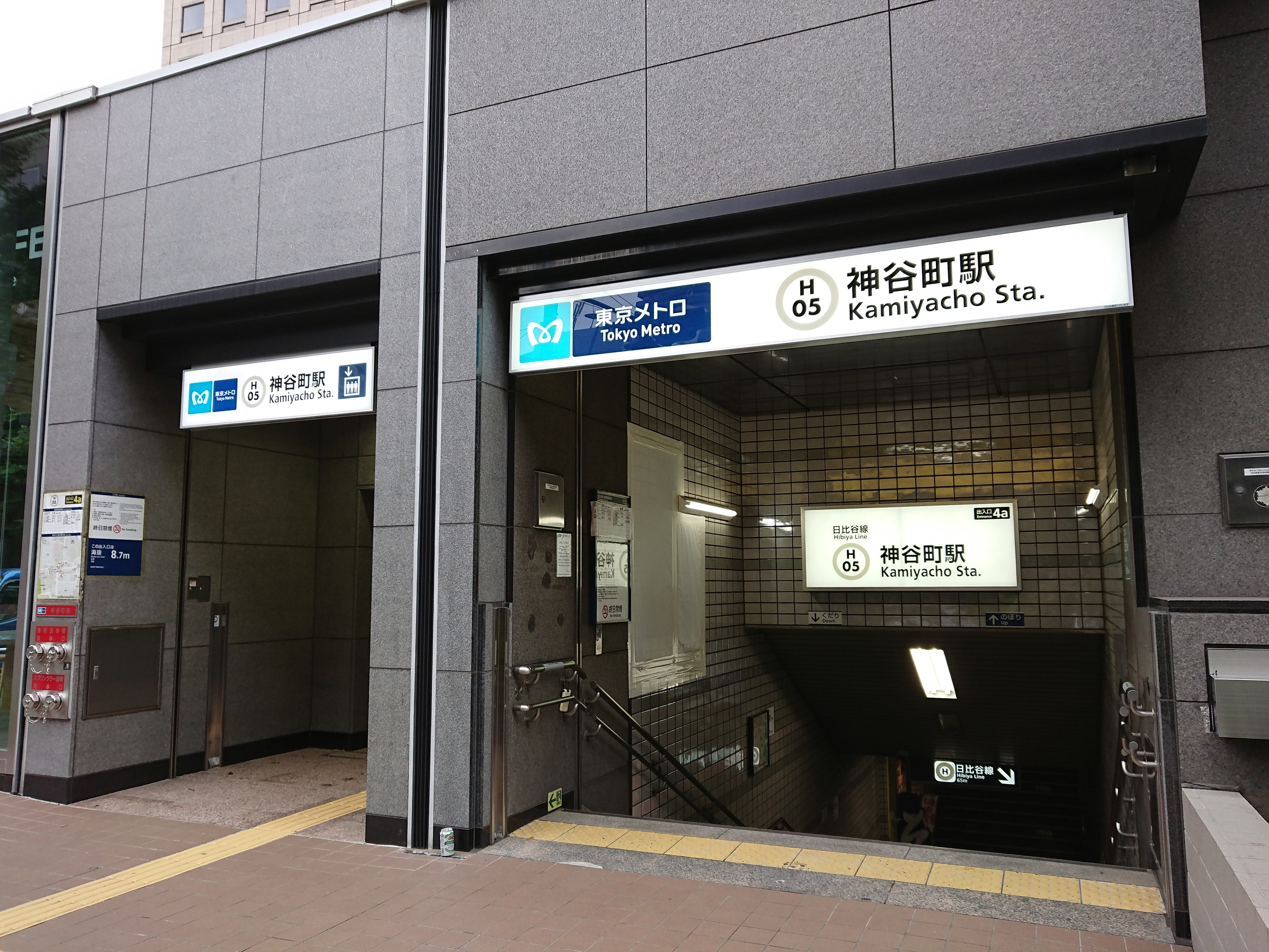
- Exit No. 4a in July 2020

General information
- Location: Toranomon 5-chome, Minato, Tokyo （東京都港区虎ノ門五丁目） Japan
- Operator: Tokyo Metro
- Line: Hibiya Line
- Platforms: 2 side platforms
- Tracks: 2
- Connections: Bus stop

Construction
- Structure type: Underground

Other information
- Station code: H-05

History
- Opened: 25 March 1964; 62 years ago

Passengers
- FY2019: 106,952 daily

Services
Preceding station	Tokyo Metro	Following station
Roppongi towards Ebisu	TH Liner	Toranomon Hills One-way operation
Roppongi towards Naka-meguro	Hibiya Line	Toranomon Hills towards Kita-Senju
Location
- Location within Tokyo Yamanote Loop Location within Tokyo wards area Location within Japan

Kamiyachō Station (神谷町駅, Kamiyachō-eki) is a subway station in Minato, Tokyo operated by Tokyo Metro. The Station Number is H-05.

The station is named after the historical Kamiyachō district, which was absorbed into Toranomon in 1977.

== Station layout ==
1	Hibiya Line	for Naka-Meguro
2	Hibiya Line	for Ginza, Ueno, Kita-Senju; Tobu Skytree Line for Tōbu-Dōbutsu-Kōen; Tobu Nikko Line for Minami-Kurihashi

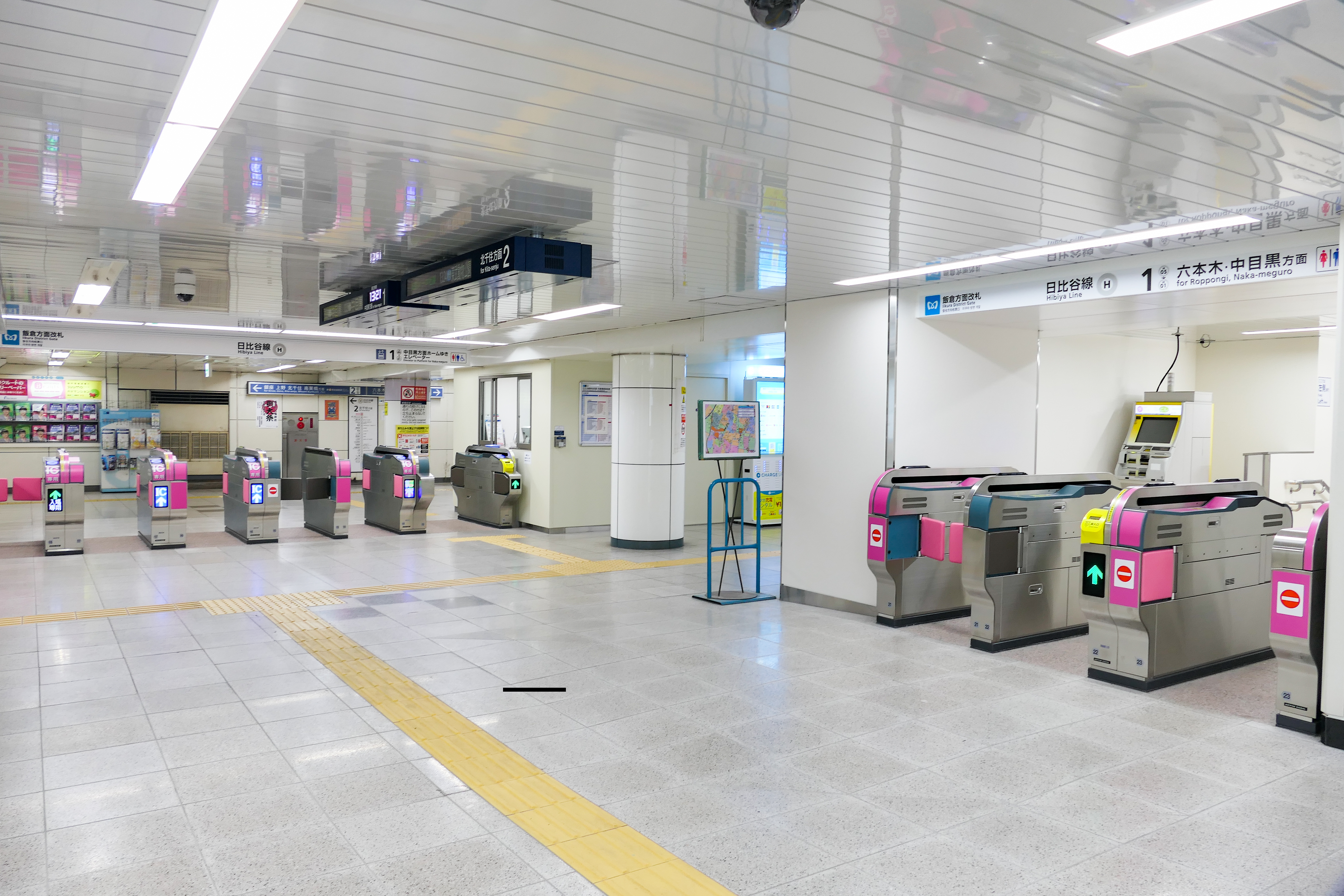
Ticket gates

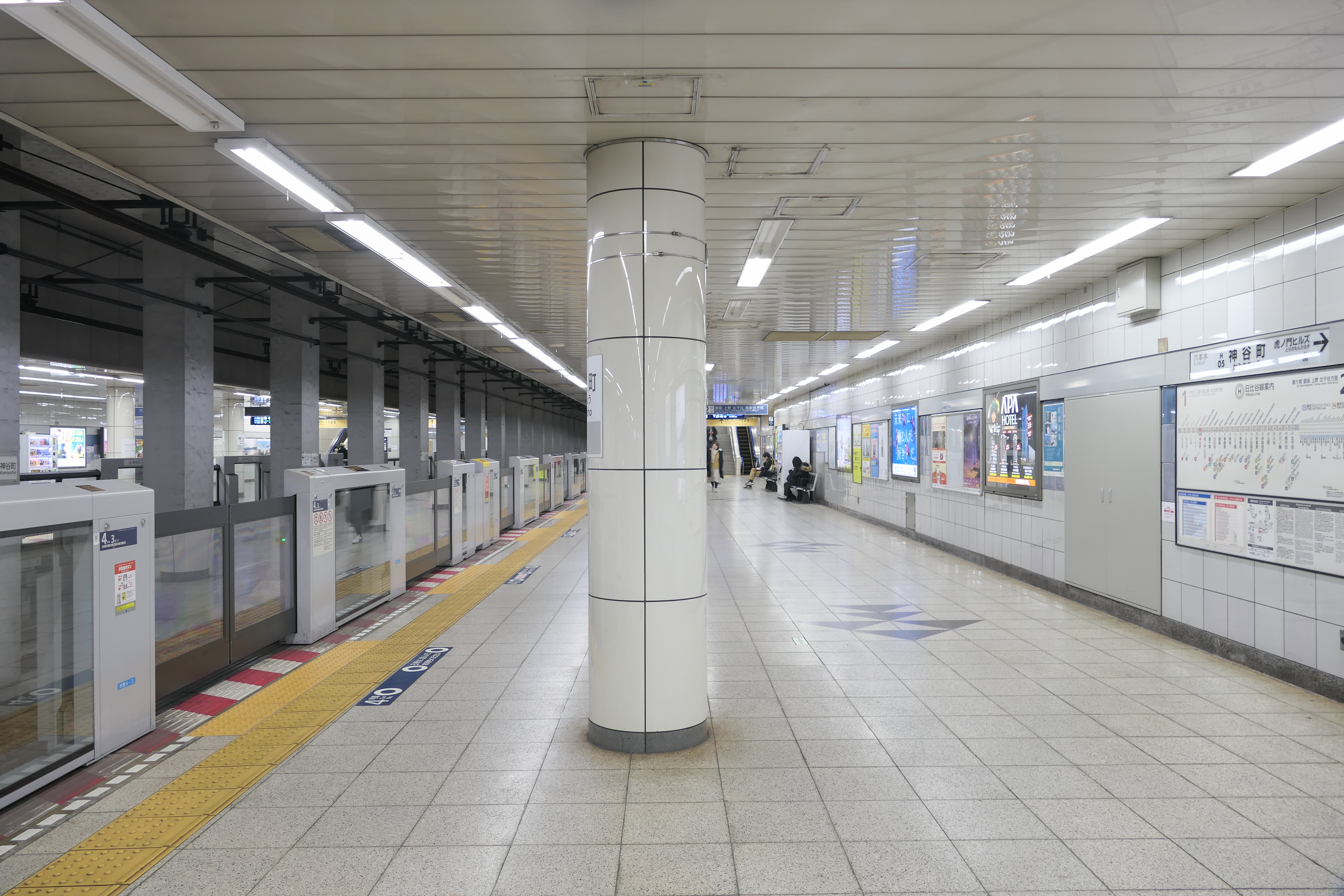
Platforms

== Bus services ==
- Kamiyacho Station mae (神谷町駅前) bus stop
  - Toei Bus
    - <渋88> Shibuya Sta. mae - Roppongi Sta. mae - Kamiyacho Sta. mae - Tokyo Tower Entrance - Toranomon - Shimbashi Sta. mae
    - <橋86> Meguro Sta. mae - Azabu-jūban Sta. mae - Akabanebashi Sta. Mae - Kamiyacho Sta. mae - Tokyo Tower Entrance - Shimbashi Sta. mae
    - <浜95甲> Shinagawa Garage mae -> Shinagawa Sta. East Exit -> Hamamatsuchō Sta. mae -> Daimon Sta. mae -> Kanayachō Sta. mae -> Tokyo Tower Entrance -> Tokyo Tower

== Surrounding area ==
- Tokyo Tower
- Atago Green Hills

== History ==
- March 25, 1964: The station was opened by the Teito Rapid Transit Authority (TRTA).
- January 27, 1968: A fire broke out on board a Tobu 2000 series train.
- March 20, 1995: The sarin gas attack on the Tokyo subway occurred. The station was frequently mentioned in news reports in the aftermath.
- April 1, 2004: This station's operator became Tokyo Metro.
