= Kasumigaseki Station (Tokyo) =

Metro station in Tokyo, Japan

Kasumigaseki Station 霞ヶ関駅

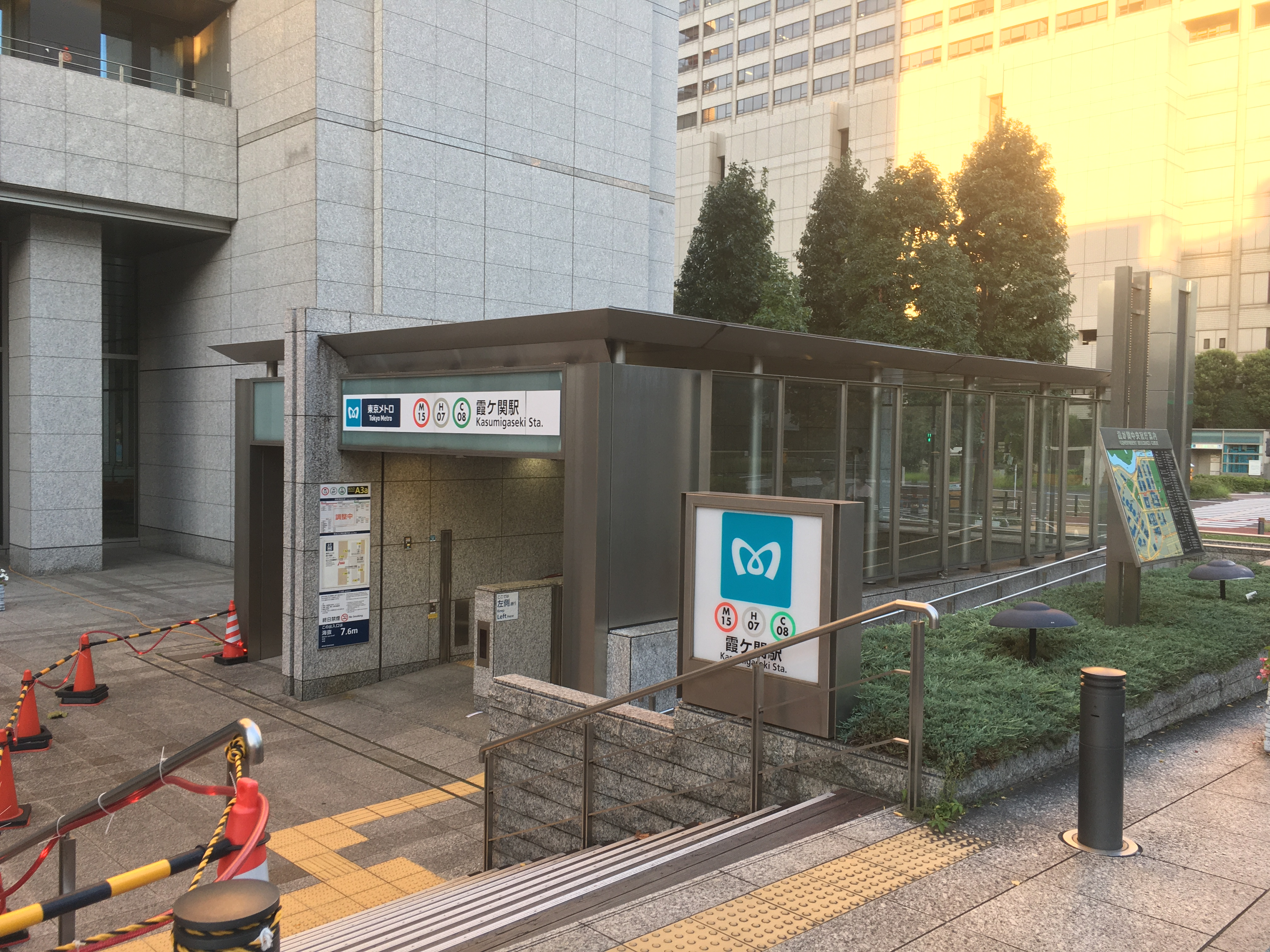
- A3A entrance in 2021

Japanese name
- Shinjitai: 霞ケ関駅
- Kyūjitai: 霞ケ關驛
- Hiragana: かすみがせきえき

General information
- Location: 2-1-2 Kasumigaseki, Chiyoda-ku, Tokyo; Japan
- Coordinates: 35.673888°N 139.751061°E
- System: Tokyo subway
- Owner: Tokyo Metro Co., Ltd.
- Operator: Tokyo Metro
- Lines: Chiyoda Line; Hibiya Line; Marunouchi Line
- Platforms: 2 side platforms and 1 island platform
- Tracks: 6

Construction
- Structure type: Underground

Other information
- Station code: M15, H07, C08

History
- Opened: 15 October 1958; 67 years ago

Passengers
- FY2019: 151,997 daily

Services
Preceding station	Tokyo Metro	Following station
Omote-sando towards Hakone-Yumoto, Gotemba or Katase-Enoshima	Romancecar	Ōtemachi towards Kita-Senju
Kokkai-gijidō-mae towards Yoyogi-Uehara	Chiyoda Line	Hibiya towards Kita-Ayase
Toranomon Hills (one-way trains) towards Ebisu	TH Liner	Ginza towards Kuki
Toranomon Hills towards Naka-meguro	Hibiya Line	Hibiya towards Kita-Senju
Kokkai-gijidō-mae towards Ogikubo or Hōnanchō	Marunouchi Line	Ginza towards Ikebukuro
Location
- Location within Tokyo Yamanote Loop Location within Tokyo wards area Location within Japan

Kasumigaseki Station (霞ヶ関駅, Kasumigaseki-eki) is a subway station in Chiyoda, Tokyo, Japan, operated by the Tokyo subway operator Tokyo Metro. The station is located in the Kasumigaseki government district.

== Lines ==
Kasumigaseki Station is served by the following three Tokyo Metro lines.

- Marunouchi Line (M-15)
- Hibiya Line (H-07)
- Chiyoda Line (C-08)

== Station layout ==
The platforms for Marunouchi Line serving two tracks consist of one island platform and one side platform. One side of the island platform is closed off by a fence. The platform for the Hibiya Line is an island platform serving two tracks. The platform for the Chiyoda Line is an island platform serving two tracks.

The platforms for the Chiyoda Line and the Marunouchi Line are not directly connected, and transferring passengers need to walk through the Hibiya Line platform, which takes about five minutes.

=== Platforms ===
1	Marunouchi Line	for Ogikubo, and Honancho
2	Marunouchi Line	for Ikebukuro
3	Hibiya Line	for Ebisu and Naka-meguro
4	Hibiya Line	for Ginza, Ueno, and Kita-senju; Tobu Skytree Line for Tōbu-Dōbutsu-Kōen; Tobu Nikko Line for Minami-Kurihashi
5	Chiyoda Line	for Meiji-jingumae and Yoyogi-uehara; Odakyu Odawara Line for Hon-Atsugi and Isehara
6	Chiyoda Line	for Otemachi, Kita-senju, Ayase, and Kita-ayase; Jōban Line (Local) for Abiko and Toride

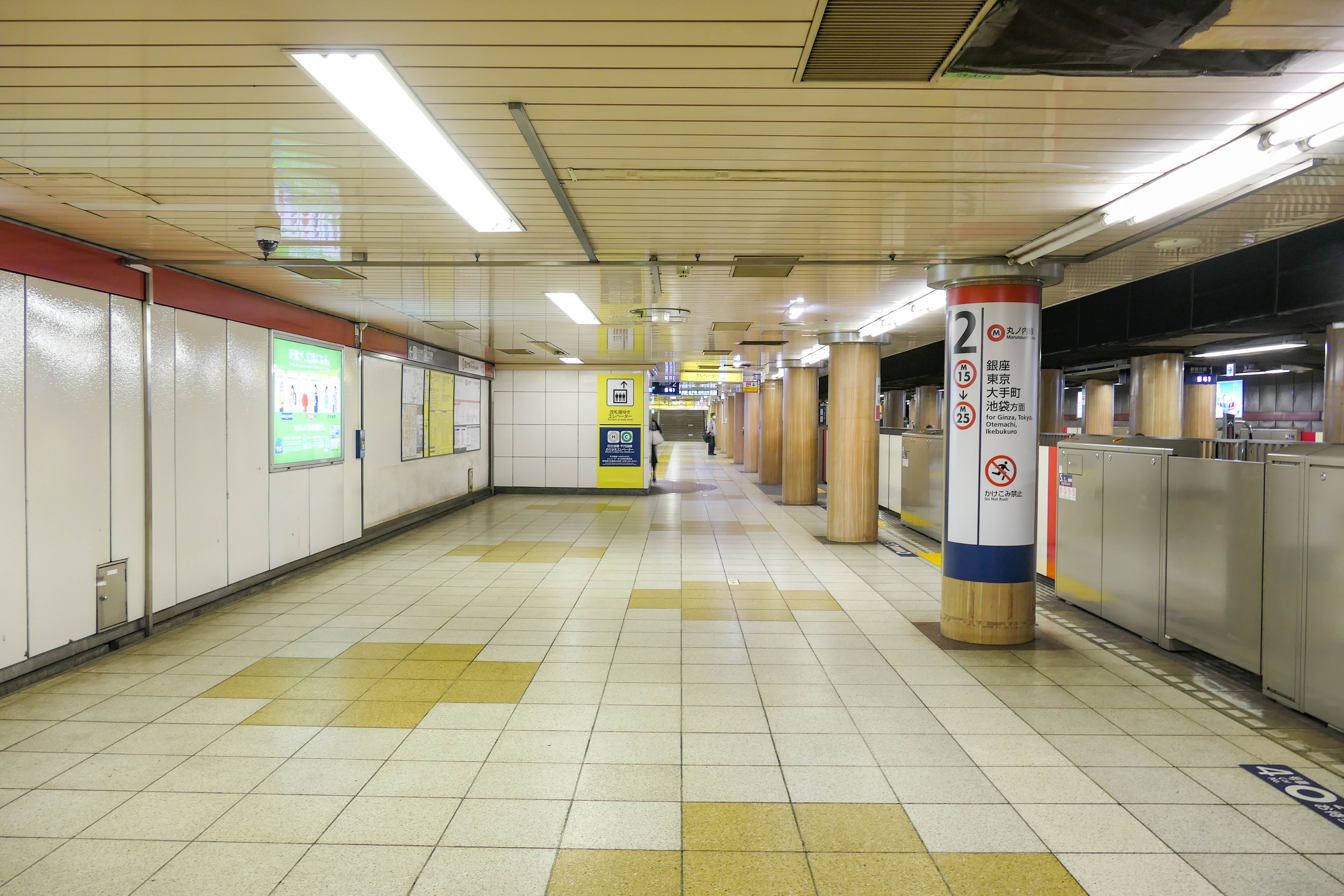
Marunouchi Line platforms

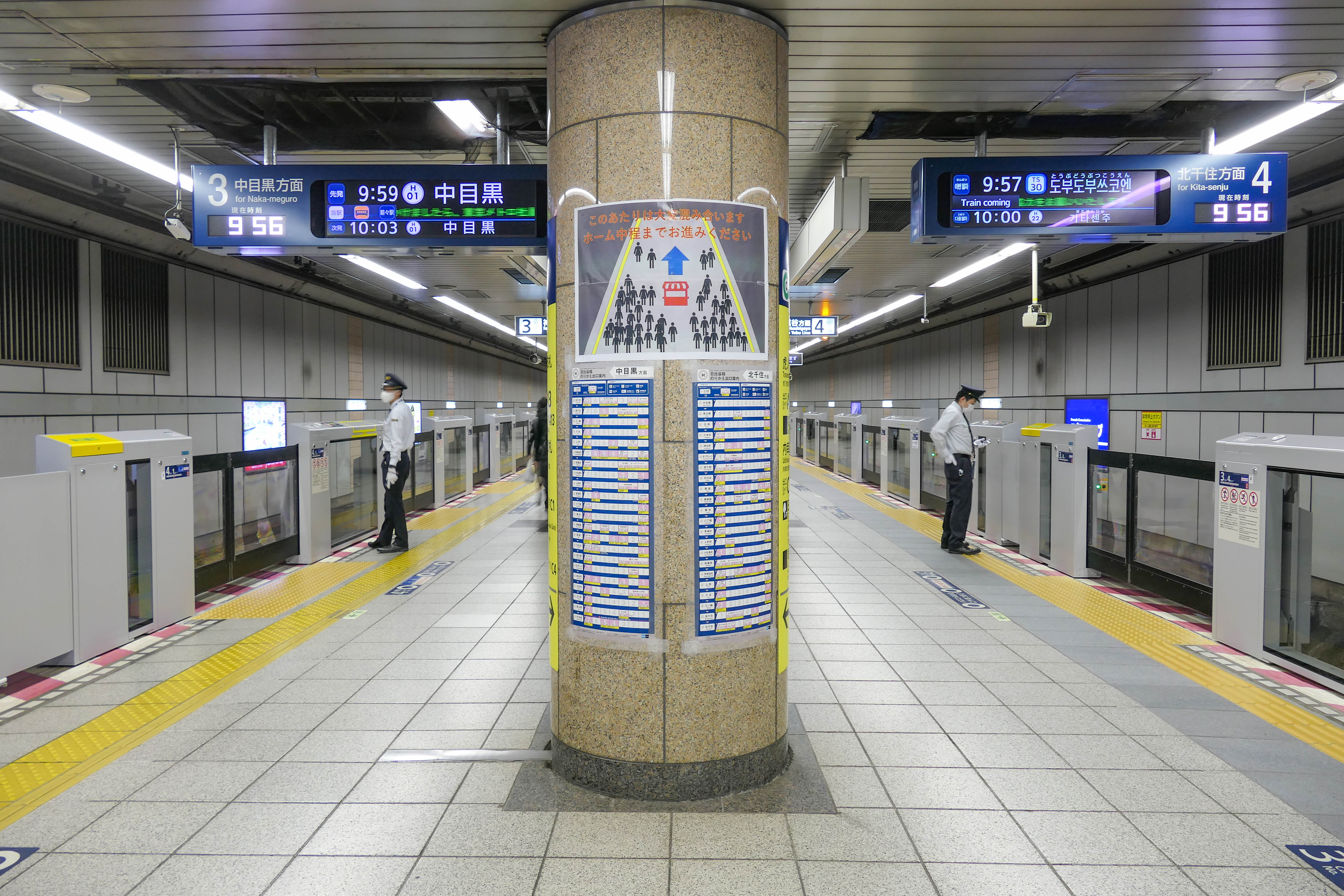
Hibiya Line platform

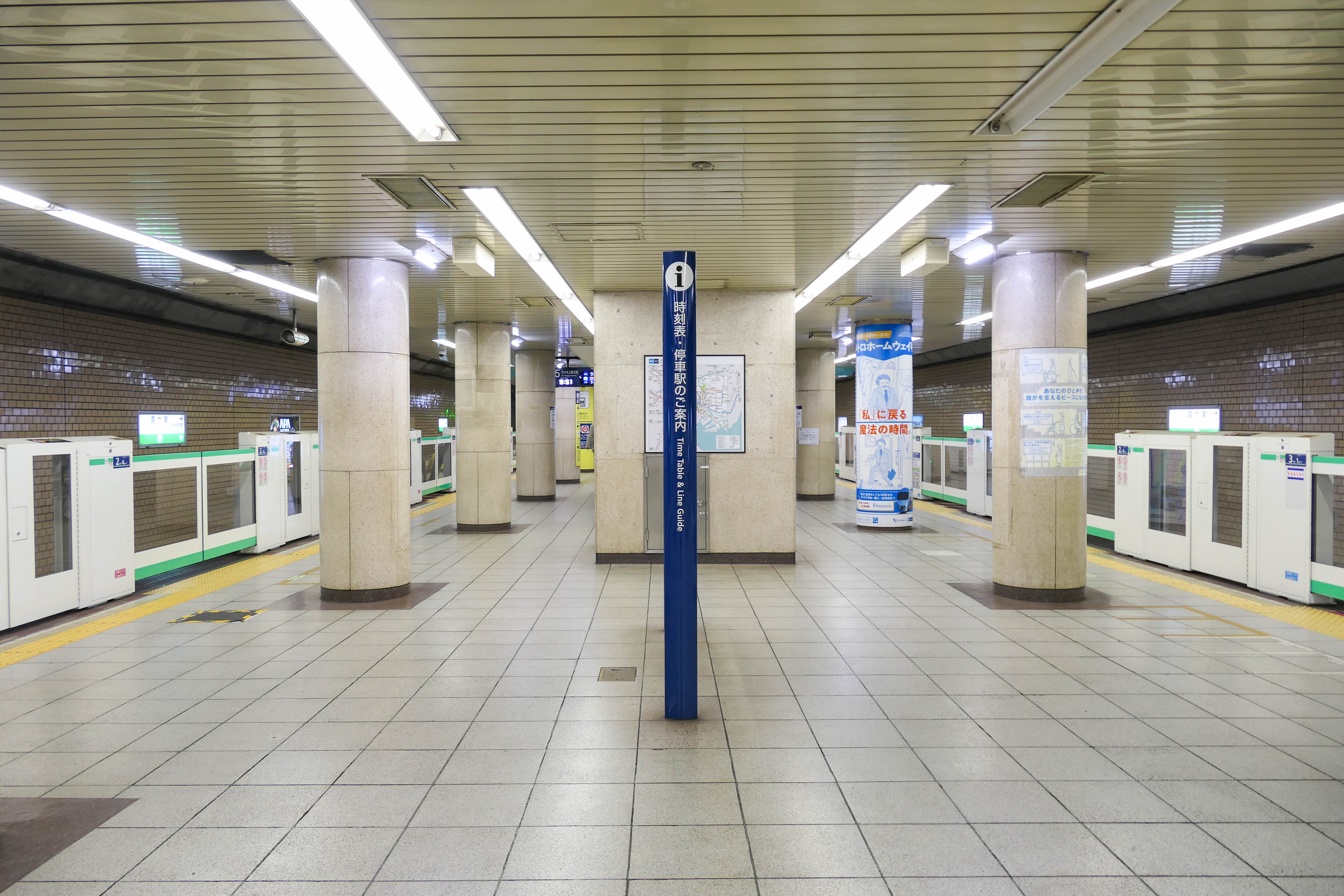
Chiyoda Line platform

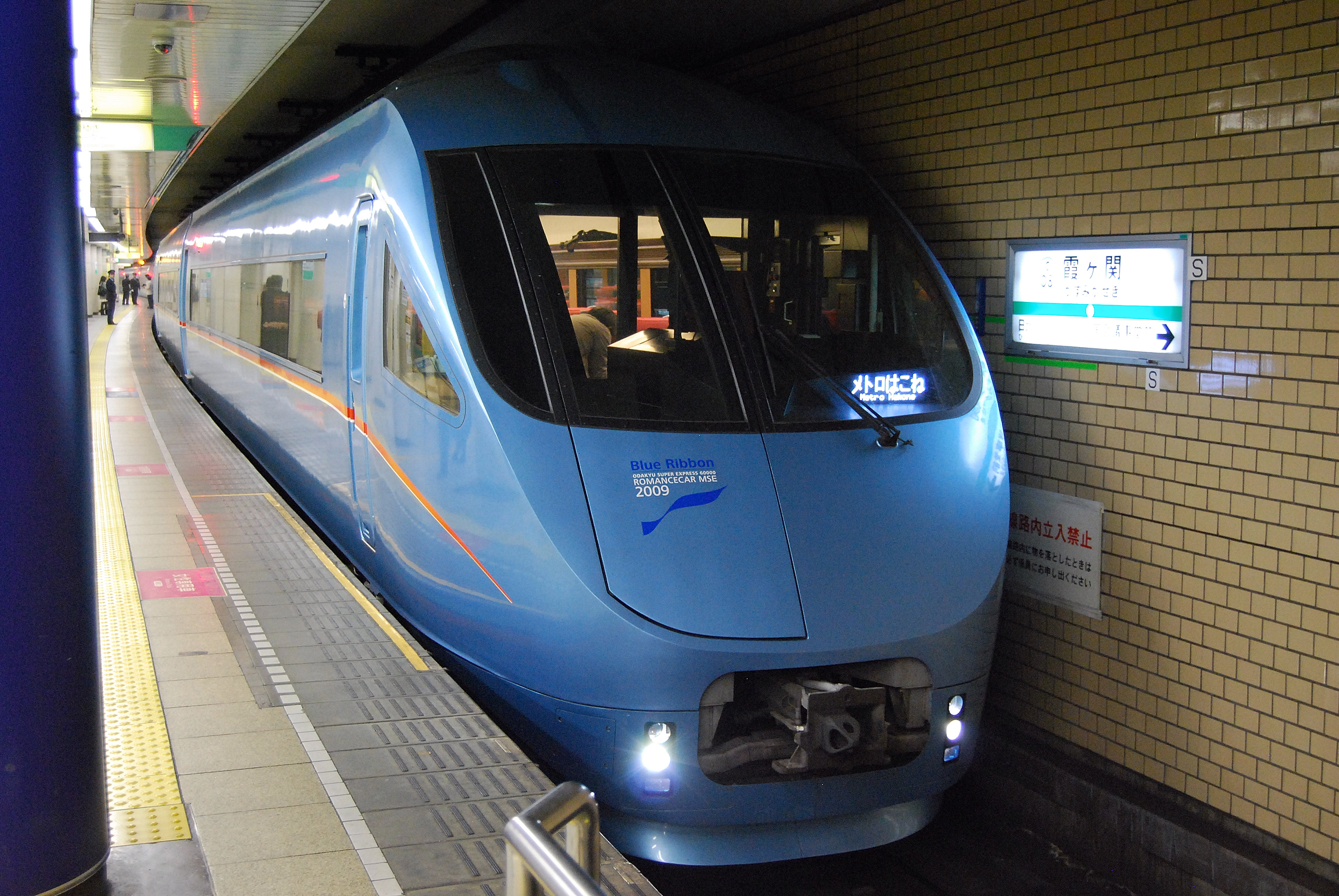
An Odakyu 60000 series MSE Romancecar train on Metro Hakone at the Chiyoda Line platform, 2010

== History ==
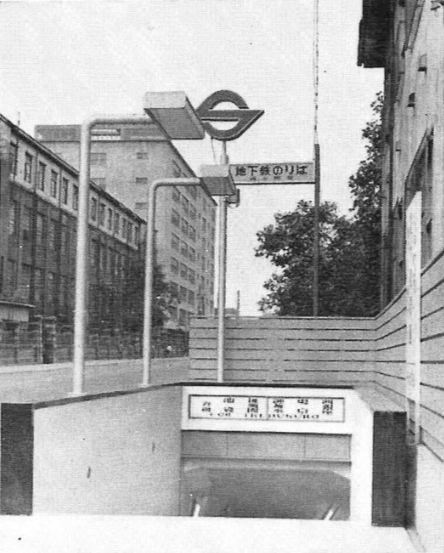
The station in 1958.

- 15 October 1958: The Marunouchi Line station opens.
- 25 March 1964: The Hibiya Line station opens.
- 20 March 1971: The Chiyoda Line station opens.
- 15 March 1995: Aum Shinrikyo attempts a biological attack by surreptitiously spreading Botulinum toxin in the station. There are no known casualties.
- 20 March 1995: Sarin gas attack targets the station.
- 1 April 2004: Ownership of the station is transferred to Tokyo Metro owing to the privatization of the Teito Rapid Transit Authority (TRTA).
- 6 June 2020: Start of services on the TH Liner

== Surrounding area ==
- Sakuradamon Station
- Tokyo Metropolitan Police Department
- National Police Agency
- Ministry of Foreign Affairs
- Ministry of Finance
- Ministry of Economy, Trade and Industry
- Japan Post Holdings
- Hibiya Park
- Inner Circular Route Kasumigaseki

== See also ==
- List of railway stations in Japan
- Kasumigaseki Station (Saitama), a station in Saitama Prefecture with the same name
