= Toranomon Station =

Metro station in Tokyo, Japan

Coordinates: 35.670175°N 139.749929°E

Toranomon Station 虎ノ門駅

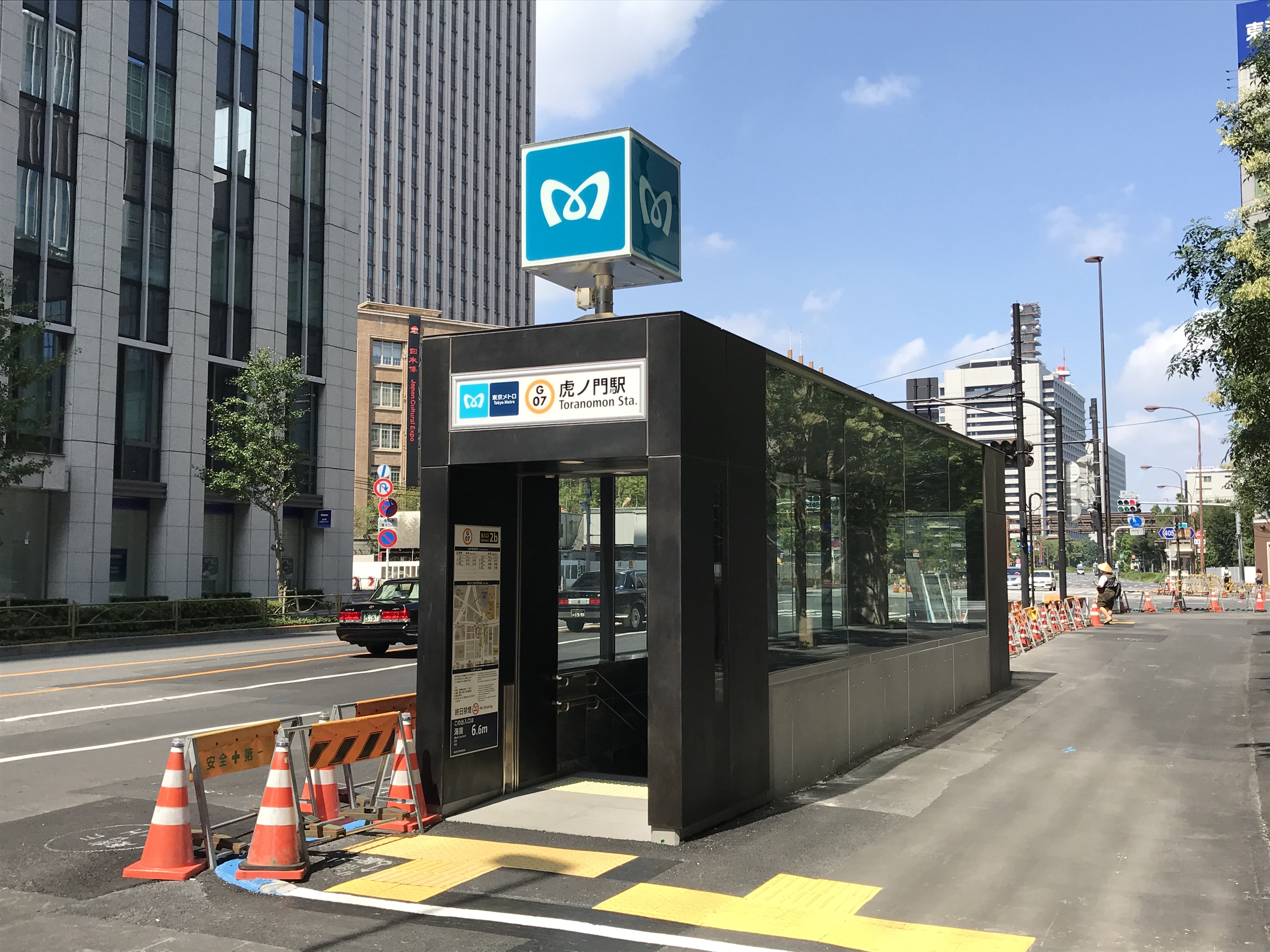
- ExitA2a in September 2020

Japanese name
- Kyūjitai: 虎ノ門駅
- Literal meaning: Tiger Door Station

General information
- Location: 1-1-21 Toranomon, Minato, Tokyo; Japan
- Operator: Tokyo Metro
- Line: Ginza Line
- Platforms: 2 side platforms
- Tracks: 2
- Connections: Toranomon Hills Station

Construction
- Structure type: Underground

Other information
- Station code: G-07

History
- Opened: 18 November 1938; 87 years ago

Services
| Preceding station | Tokyo Metro | Following station |
|---|---|---|
| Tameike-sannō towards Shibuya | Ginza Line | Shimbashi towards Asakusa |
Location
- Location within Tokyo Yamanote Loop Location within Tokyo wards area Location within Japan

Toranomon Station (虎ノ門駅) is a subway station on the Tokyo Metro Ginza Line. It is located between Toranomon in Minato Ward and Kasumigaseki in Chiyoda Ward.

== History ==
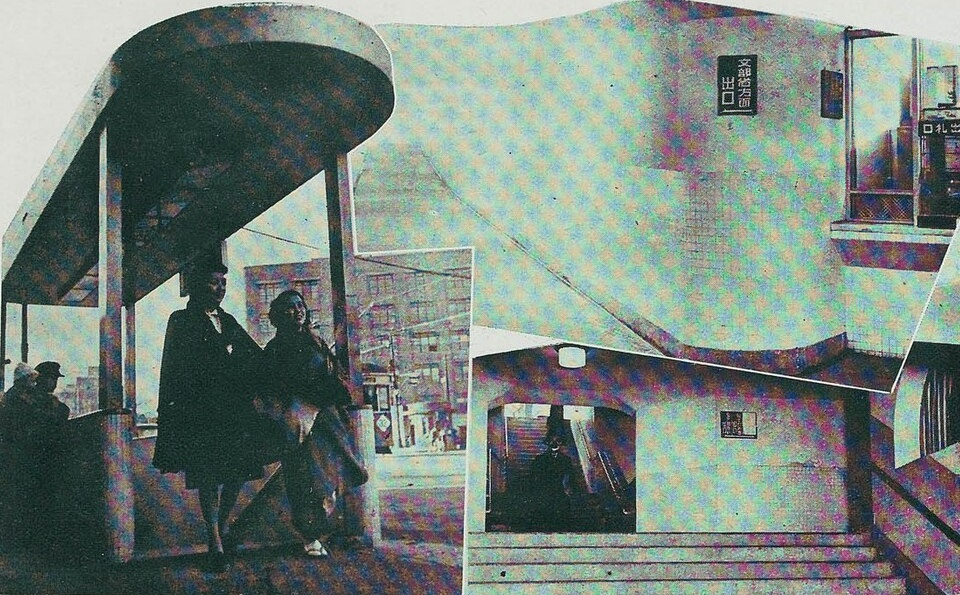
Exits of Toranomon Station on the Tokyo Rapid Railway in the late 1930s.

The station opened on November 18, 1938, as the eastern terminus of the original section of the Tokyo Rapid Railway from Aoyama-Rokuchōme (now Omotesandō). It became a through station when the line was extended to Shimbashi on January 15, 1939.

The station facilities were inherited by Tokyo Metro after the privatization of the Teito Rapid Transit Authority (TRTA) in 2004.

== Station layout ==
The station has two side platforms — one for each direction.

| 1 | Ginza Line | for Akasaka-mitsuke and Shibuya |
| 2 | Ginza Line | for Ginza, Ueno, and Asakusa |

== Gallery ==
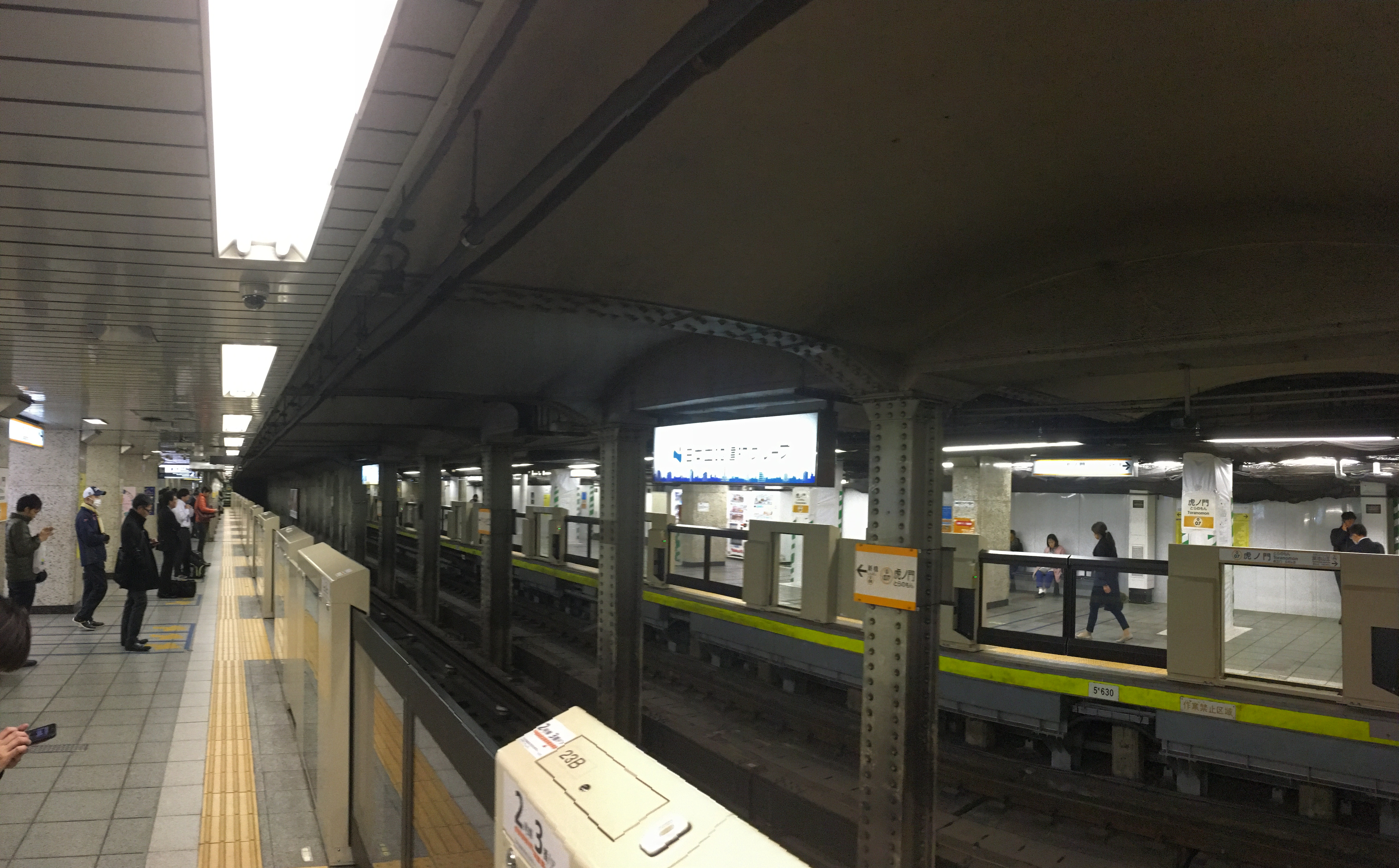
The platforms, 2019

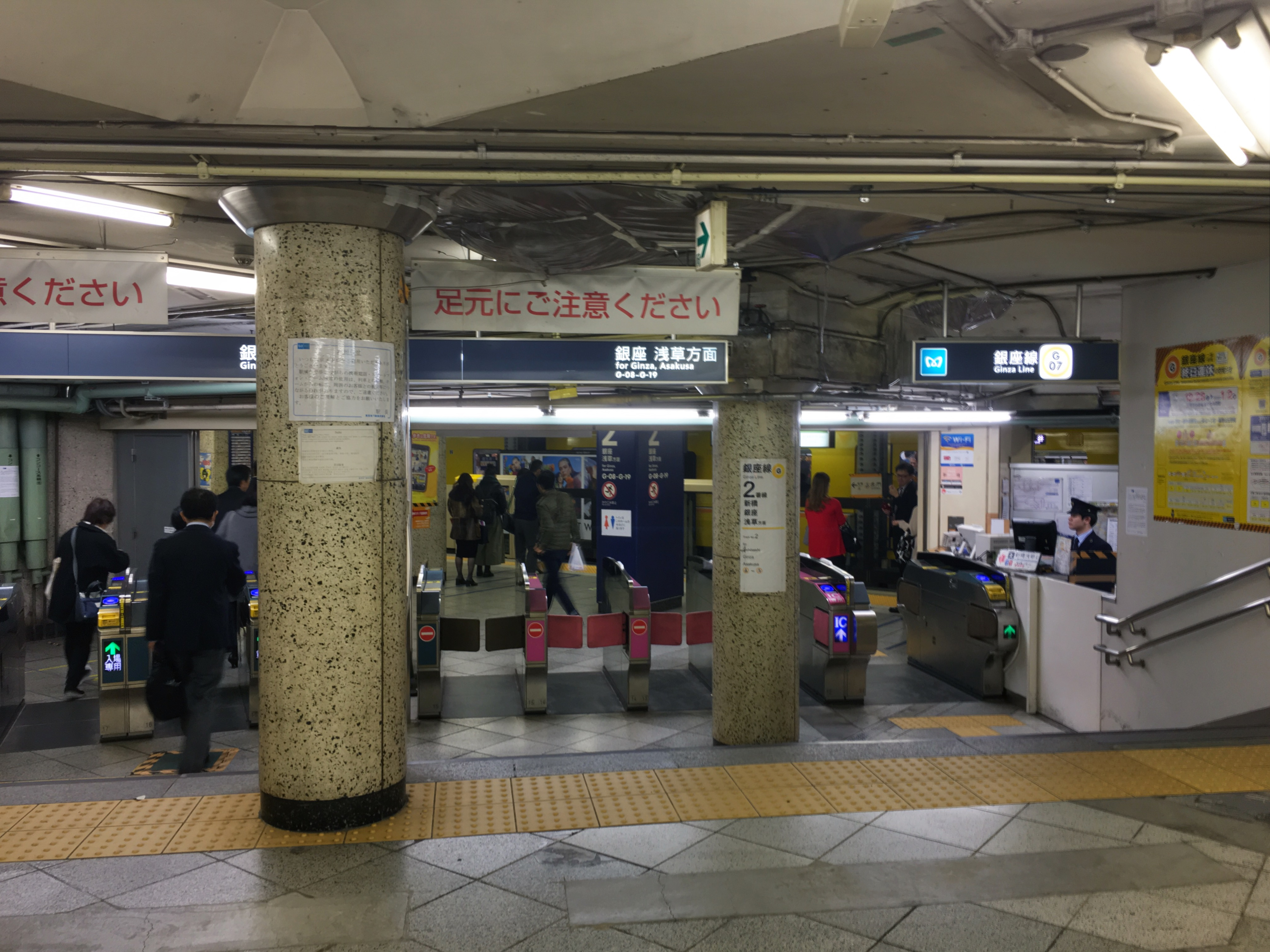
Ticket barriers, 2019

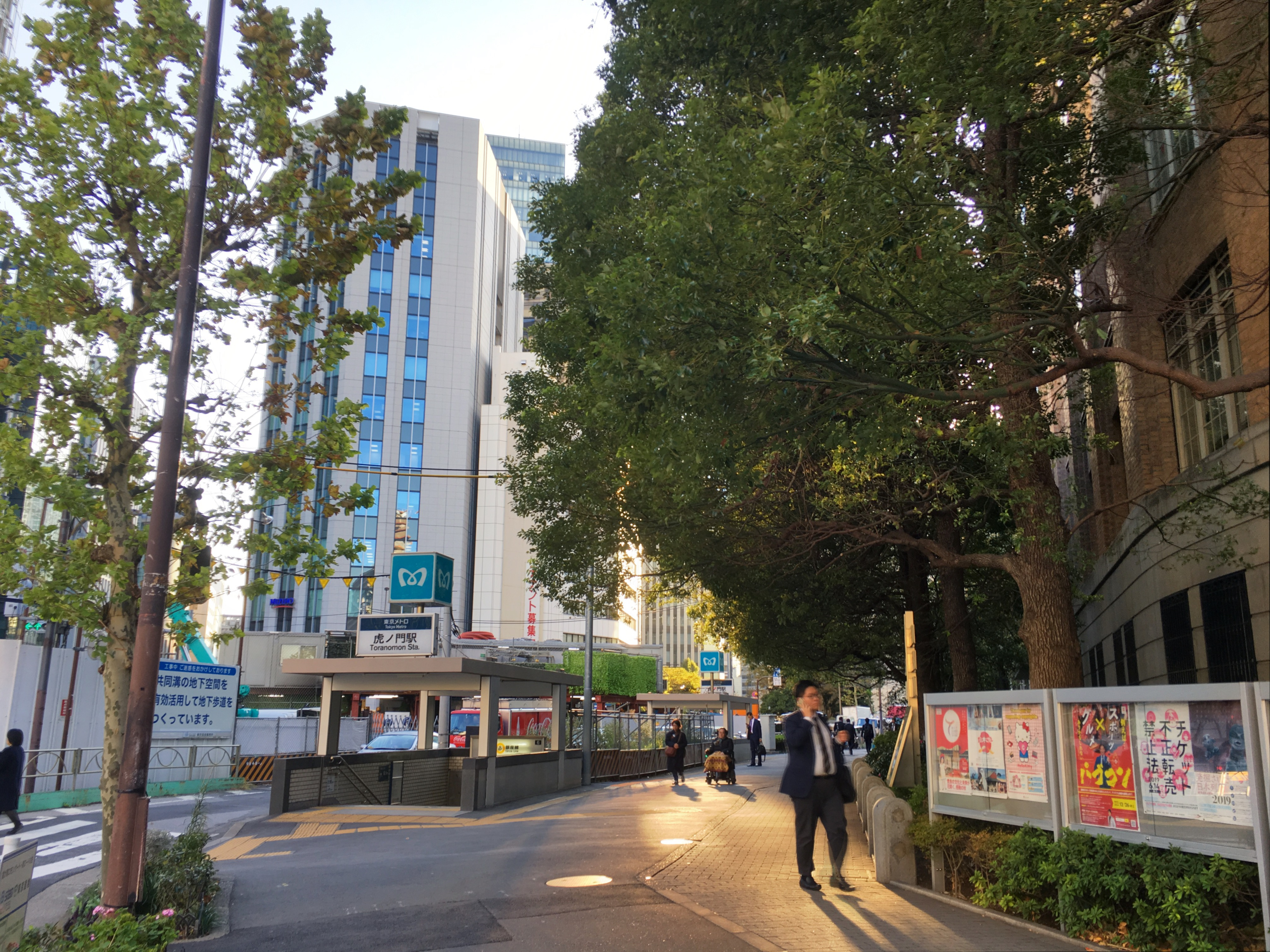
Exit 6, 2019

== Surrounding area ==
- Kasumigaseki government buildings
- Japan Post HQ
- Willcom HQ
- Japan Tobacco HQ
- Embassy of the United States, Tokyo
- Kasumigaseki Station
- Uchisaiwaicho Station (Toei Mita Line)
