= Toranomon =

District in Tokyo, Japan

Coordinates: 35.6669°N 139.7475°E

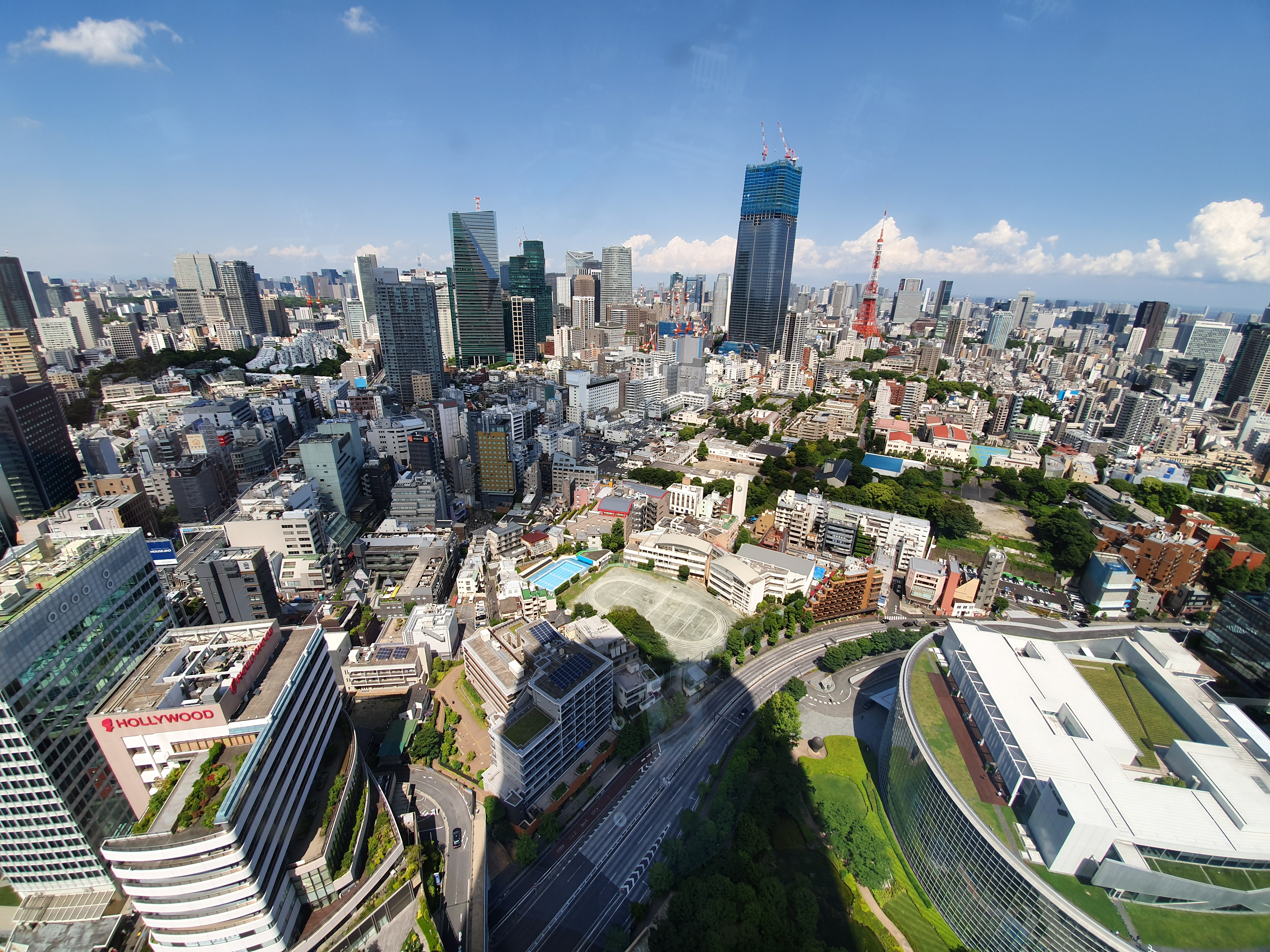
Toranomon district

Toranomon (虎ノ門) is a business district of Minato, Tokyo.

== History ==
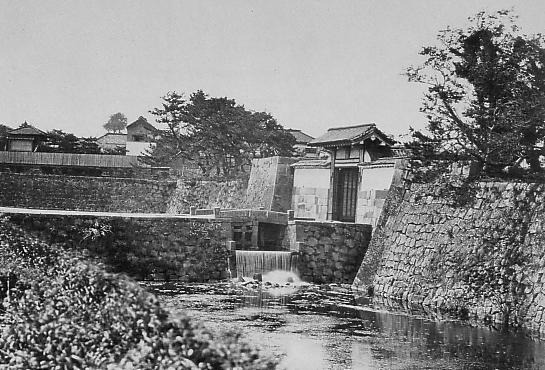
The Toranomon (Tiger Gate), demolished in the 1870s

Literally meaning "Tiger Gate", Toranomon was the name of the southernmost gate of Edo Castle. The gate existed until the 1870s, when it was demolished to make way for modern developments. The Toranomon incident (虎ノ門事件, Toranomon Jiken) was an assassination attempt on the Prince Regent Hirohito of Japan on 27 December 1923 by communist agitator Daisuke Namba.

In 1977, the Kamiyachō district (around Kamiyachō Station) was incorporated into Toranomon.

The district is home to many corporate headquarters. From the 1970s through the mid-1990s, Japan Air System (originally Toa Domestic Airlines) was headquartered in the Ark Mori Building, in the Ark Hills complex of Toranomon. Air China also has its Tokyo offices in Toranomon, as well as TV Tokyo, Japan Tobacco, Oki Electric Industry, Fuji Fire and Marine Insurance, and Mitsui O.S.K. Lines. The Japan Meteorological Agency, the National Printing Bureau, the Okura Museum of Art and the Hotel Okura Tokyo are also located in the district.

== Education ==
Minato City Board of Education operates public elementary and junior high schools.

Toranomon 1-5-chōme is zoned to Onarimon Elementary School (御成門小学校) and Onarimon Junior High School (御成門中学校).

== See also ==
- Nihonbashi
