= Kodemmachō Station =

Metro station in Tokyo, Japan

Coordinates: 35.6906°N 139.7785°E

Kodemmacho Station 小伝馬町駅

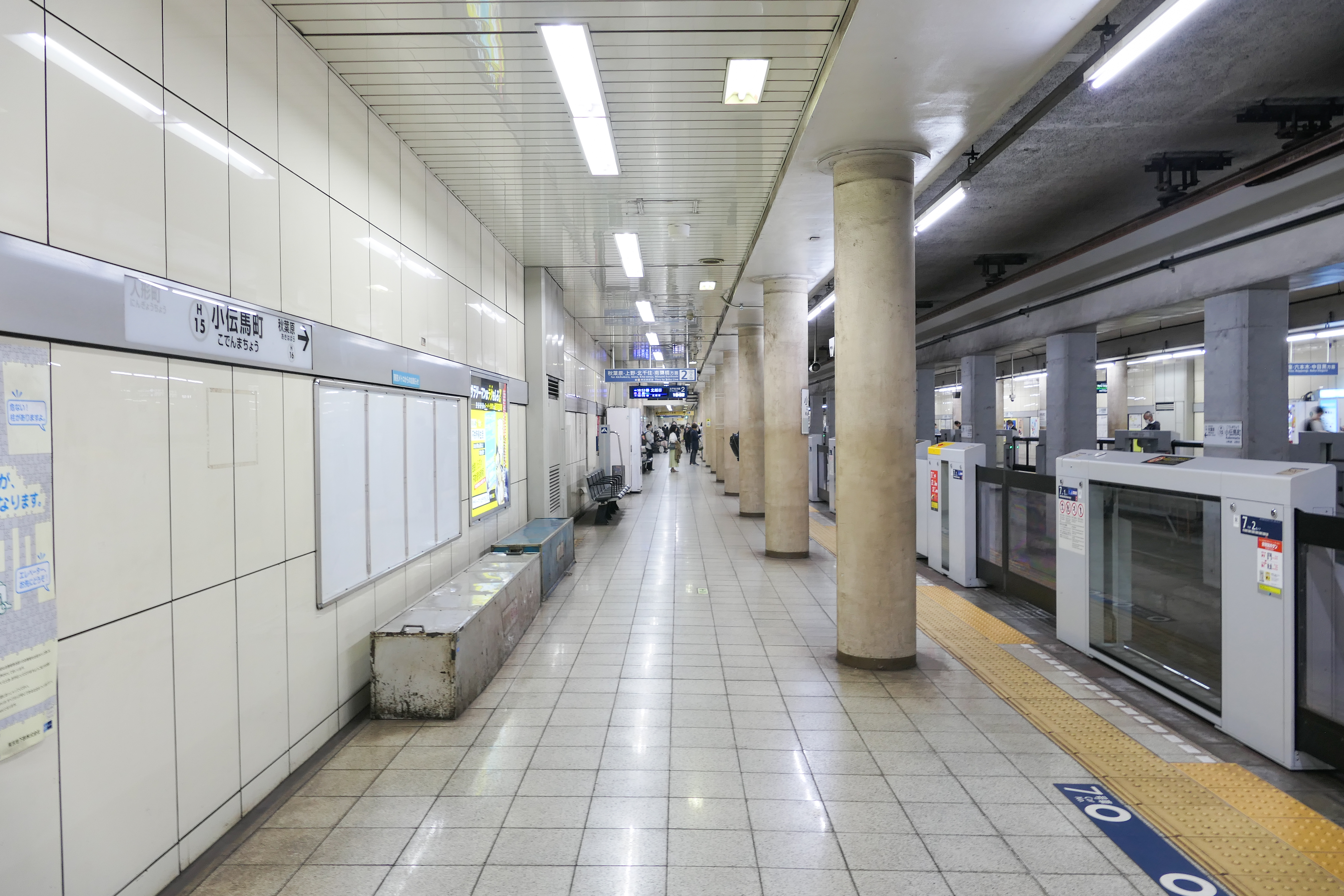
- Kodemmachō Station platforms and tracks, April 2024

Japanese name
- Shinjitai: 小伝馬町駅
- Kyūjitai: 小傳馬甼驛
- Hiragana: こでんまちょうえき

General information
- Location: 11-1 Nihonbashi-Kodenmacho, Chūō City, Tokyo; Japan
- Operator: Tokyo Metro
- Line: Hibiya Line
- Platforms: 2 side platforms
- Tracks: 2

Construction
- Structure type: Underground

Other information
- Station code: H-15
- Website: Official website

History
- Opened: 31 May 1962; 64 years ago

Services
Preceding station	Tokyo Metro	Following station
Ningyocho towards Naka-meguro	Hibiya Line	Akihabara towards Kita-Senju
Location
- Location within Tokyo Yamanote Loop Location within Tokyo wards area Location within Japan

Kodemmachō Station (小伝馬町駅, Kodenmachō-eki) is a subway station on the Hibiya Line (operated by Tokyo Metro). It is located in the Kodenmachō neighborhood of Nihonbashi, Chūō, Tokyo, Japan. Its number is H-15.

== Station layout ==
Kodemmacho Station has two platforms separated by two tracks. Track 1 is for passengers traveling toward Ginza, Roppongi and Naka-Meguro Stations. Track 2 serves those heading toward Ueno and Kita-senju Stations.

1	Hibiya Line	for Ginza, Kasumigaseki, Roppongi and Naka-Meguro
2	Hibiya Line	for Ueno and Kita-Senju; Tobu Skytree Line for Tōbu-Dōbutsu-Kōen; Tobu Nikko Line for Minami-Kurihashi

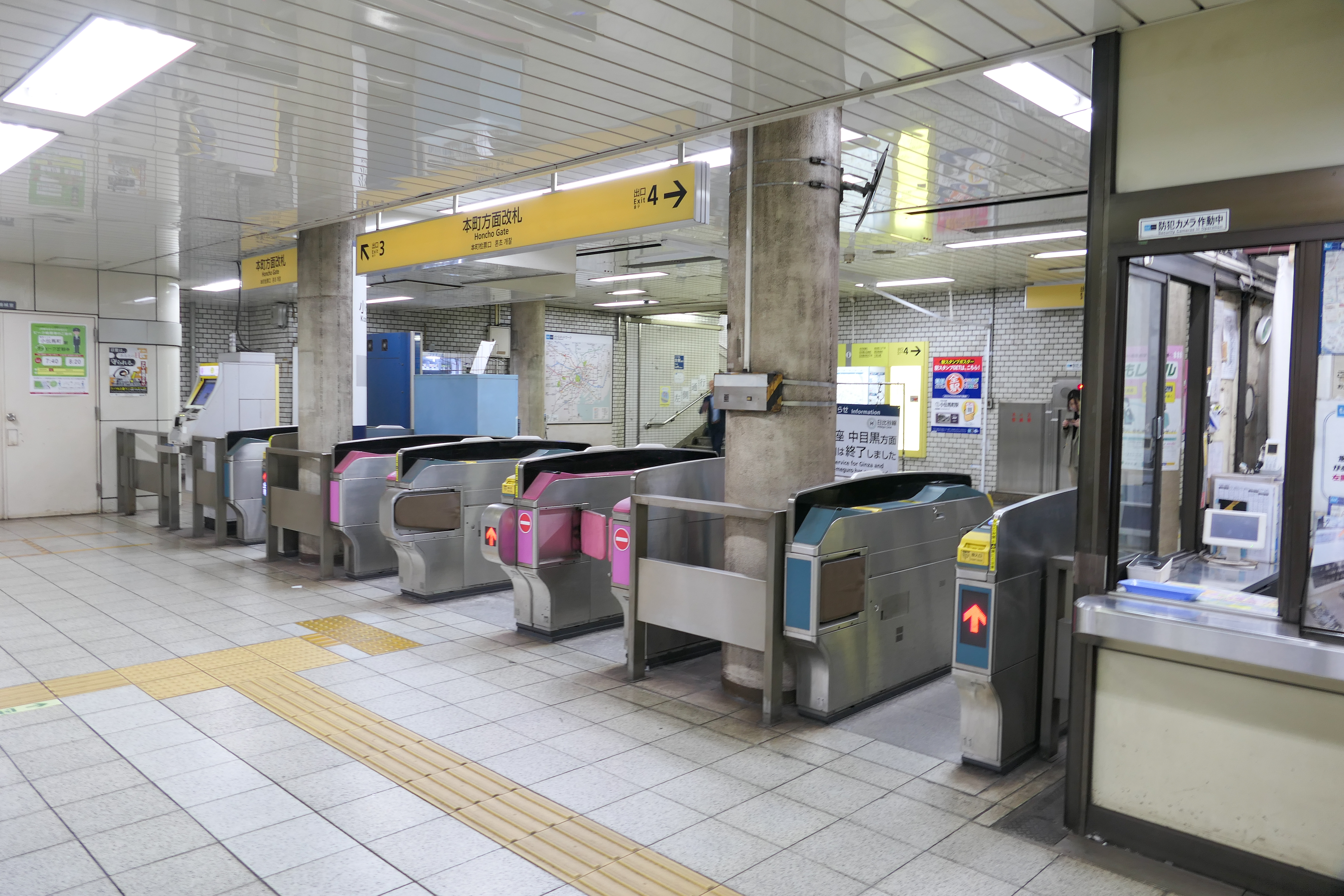
Ticket gates

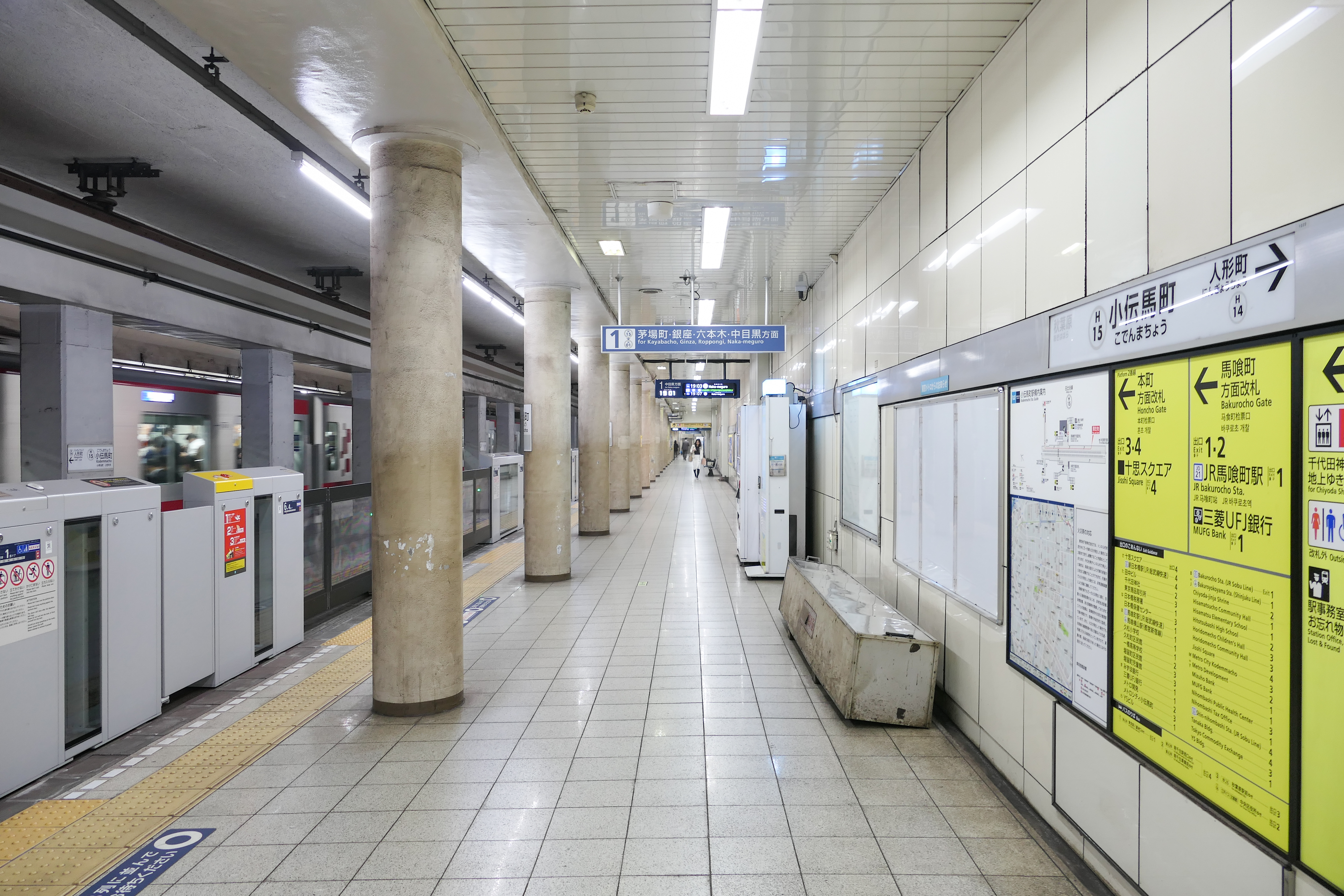
Hibiya Line platforms

== Around the station ==
The station serves the Kodemmachō neighborhood. The area has many office buildings. The boundary of Chūō and Chiyoda wards is nearby.

The Sōbu Rapid Line passes underneath Kodemmachō. However, it does not stop at the station. Passengers that want to transfer on to the Sōbu Line from Kodemmachō can walk to Bakurochō Station or Shin-Nihombashi Station, which are both less than ten minutes away on foot.

== History ==
Kodemmacho Station opened on May 31, 1962.

On March 20, 1995, three packages containing sarin were kicked from a train onto the station platform during the sarin gas attack on the Tokyo subway, resulting in four deaths at the station. More deaths occurred at this station than at any other of the stations attacked.

The station facilities were inherited by Tokyo Metro after the privatization of the Teito Rapid Transit Authority (TRTA) in 2004.
