= Iriya Station (Tokyo) =

Metro station in Tokyo, Japan

Coordinates: 35.720734°N 139.784542°E

Iriya Station 入谷駅

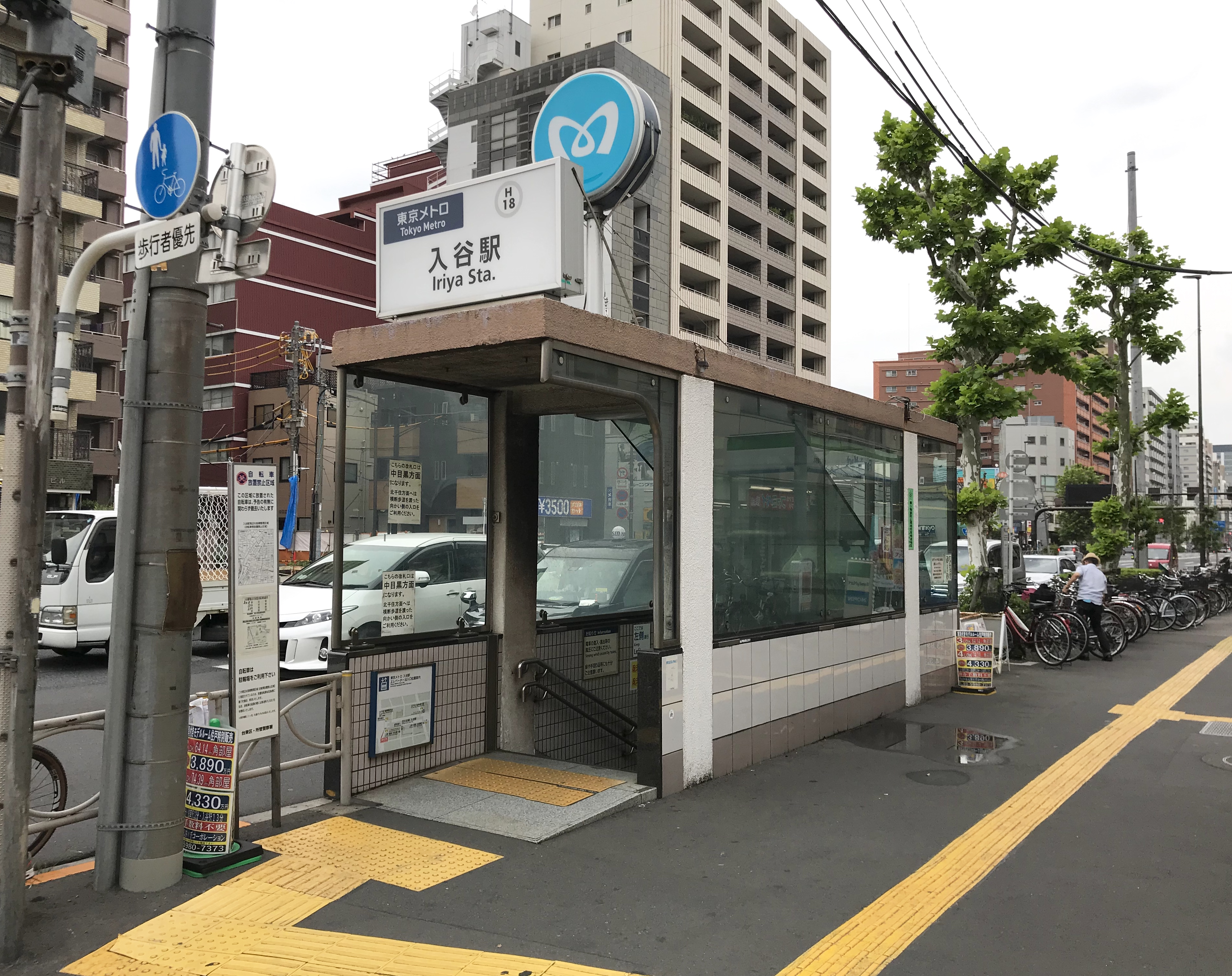
- Station entrance, August 2019

General information
- Location: 2-15-1 Shitaya, Taito City, Tokyo; Japan
- Operator: Tokyo Metro
- Line: Hibiya Line
- Platforms: 2 side platforms
- Tracks: 2

Construction
- Structure type: Underground
- Accessible: Yes

Other information
- Status: Staffed
- Station code: H-19
- Website: Official website

History
- Opened: 28 March 1961; 65 years ago

Passengers
- FY2016: 32,324 daily

Services
Preceding station	Tokyo Metro	Following station
Ueno towards Naka-meguro	Hibiya Line	Minowa towards Kita-Senju
Location
- Location within Tokyo Yamanote Loop Location within Tokyo wards area Location within Japan

Iriya Station (入谷駅, Iriya-eki) is a subway station in Taitō, Tokyo, Japan, operated by Tokyo Metro.

== Lines ==
Iriya Station is served by the Hibiya Line, and is 4.1 km from the northern starting point of the line at Kita-Senju. Its station number is H-19.

== Station layout ==
The station consists of two opposed side platforms serving two tracks.

=== Platforms ===
1	Hibiya Line	for Ueno, Ginza, and Naka-meguro
2	Hibiya Line	for Kita-senju; Tobu Skytree Line for Tōbu-Dōbutsu-Kōen; Tobu Nikko Line for Minami-Kurihashi

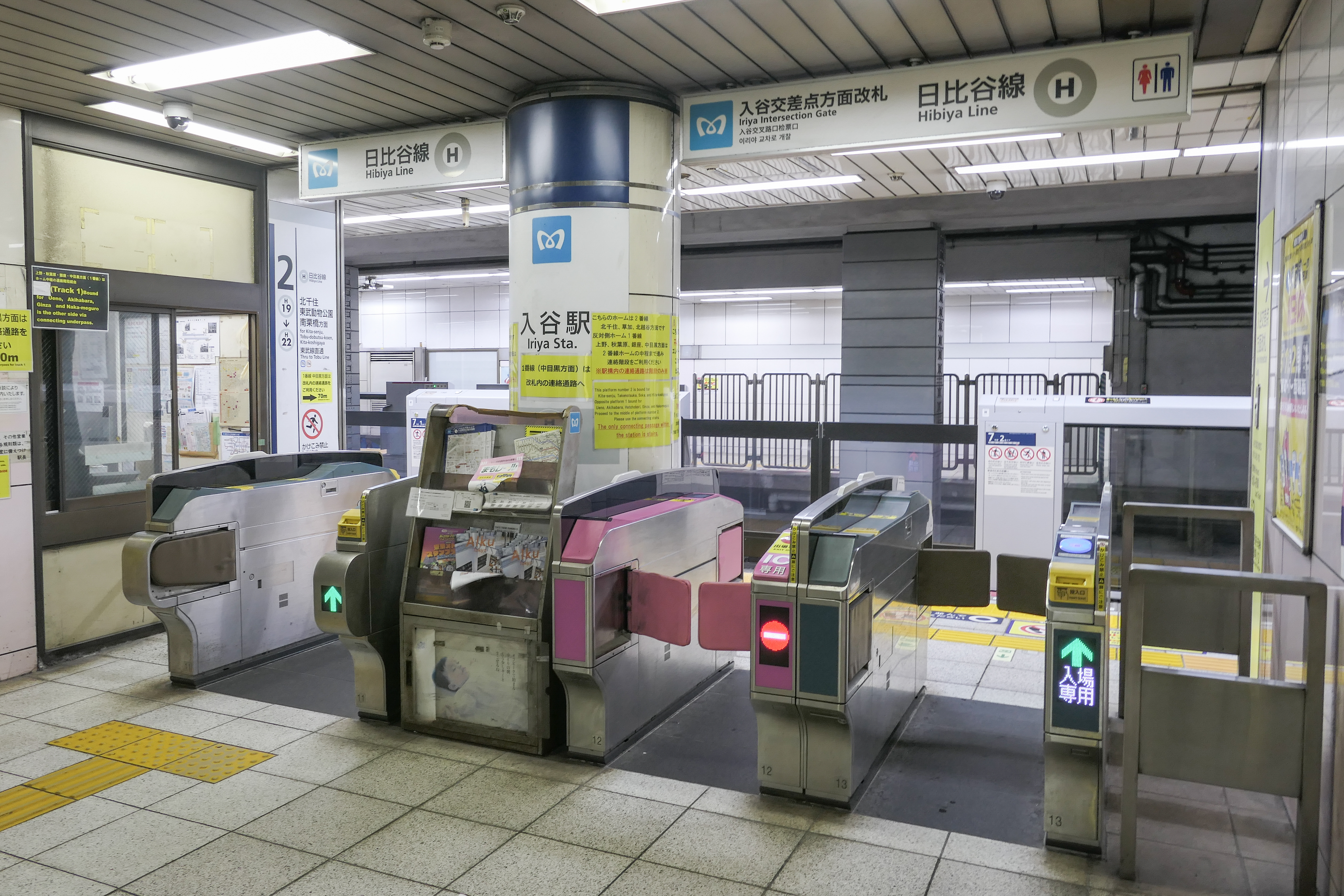
Ticket gates

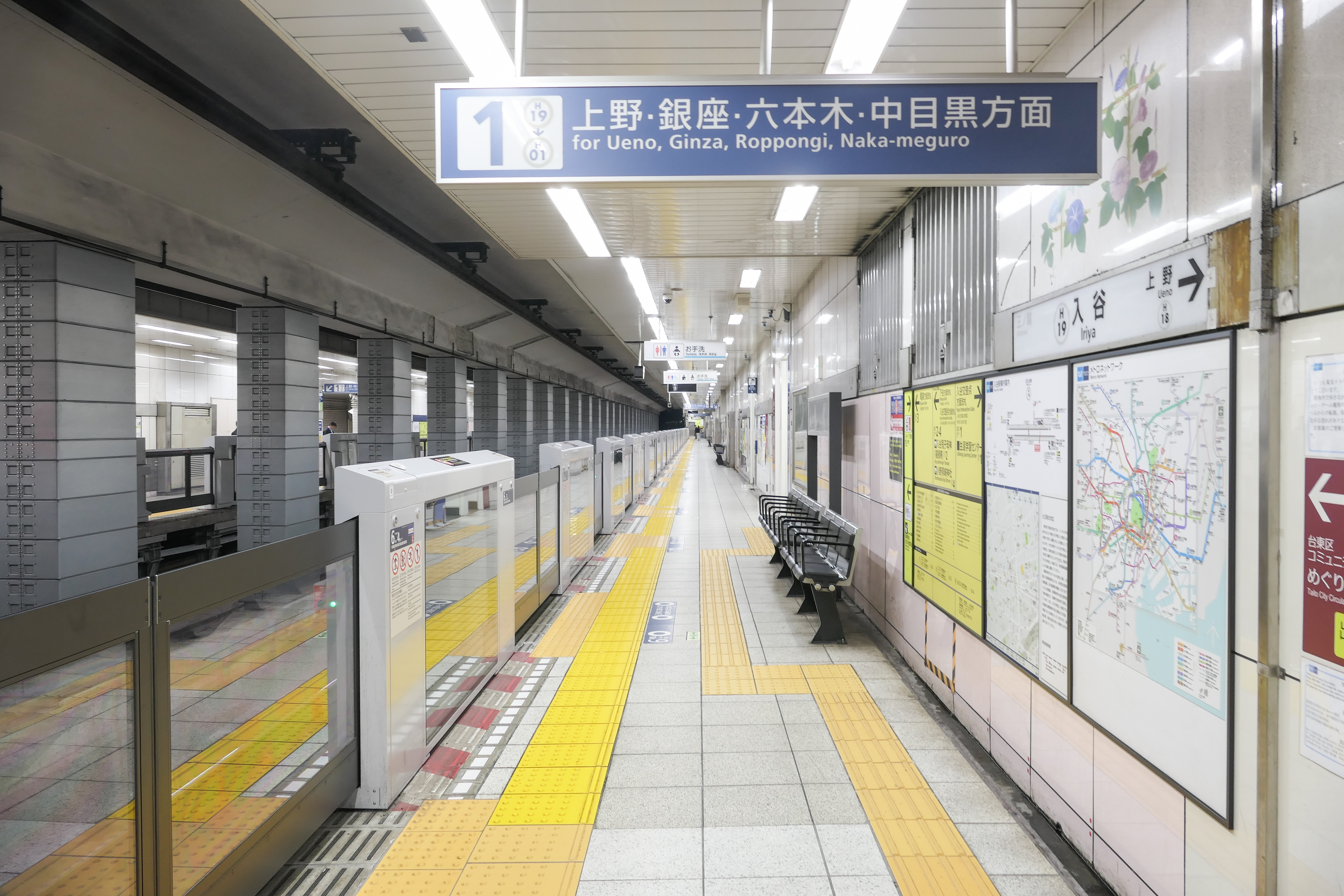
Platform 1

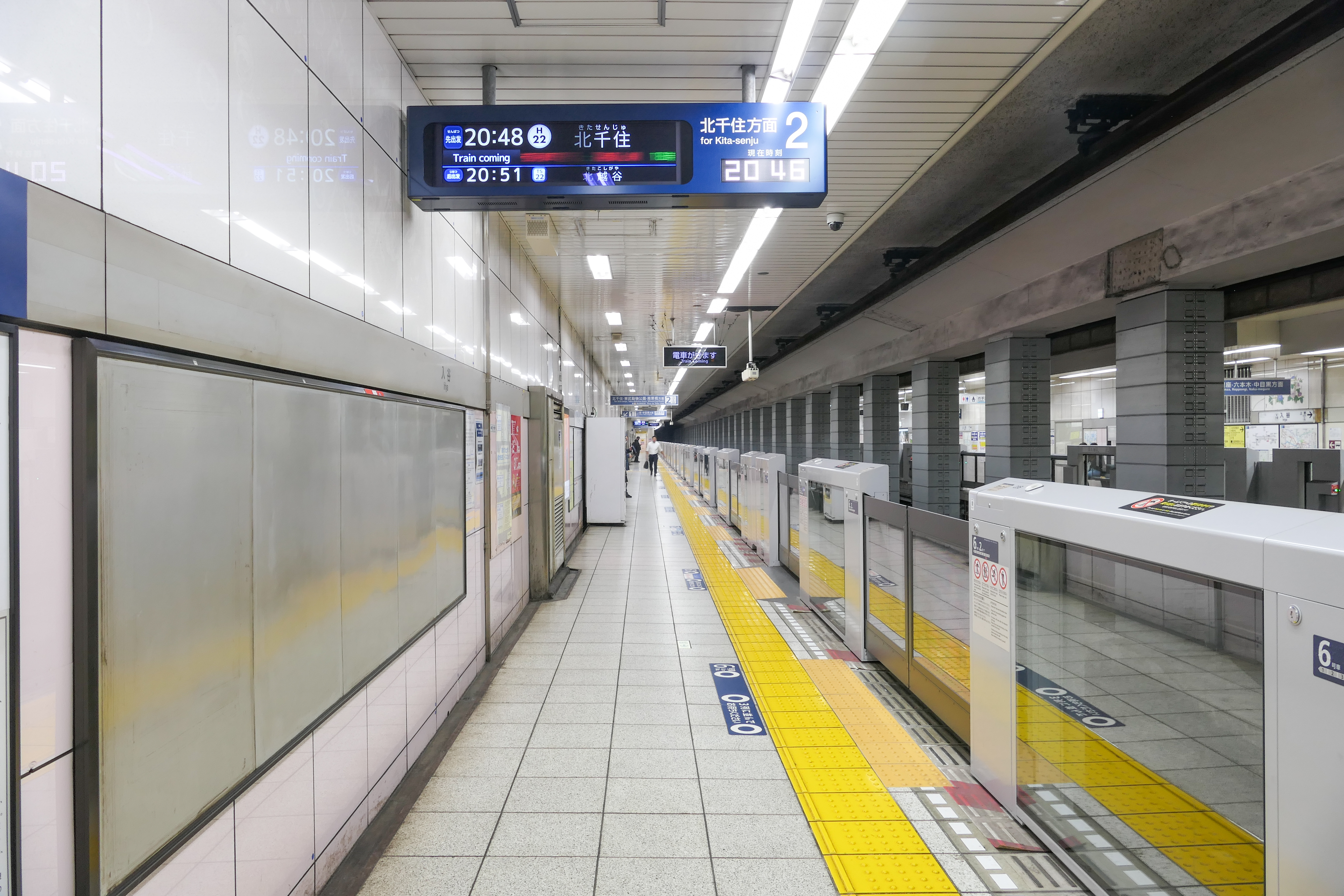
Platform 2

== History ==
The station opened on 28 March 1961.

The station facilities were inherited by Tokyo Metro after the privatization of the Teito Rapid Transit Authority (TRTA) in 2004.

== Surrounding area ==
- Uguisudani Station (on the JR Yamanote Line)
- Yoshiwara district
- Akiba Shrine
