= Minami-Senju Station =

Railway and metro station in Tokyo, Japan

Coordinates: 35.7332°N 139.7993°E

JJ04 Minami-Senju Station 南千住駅

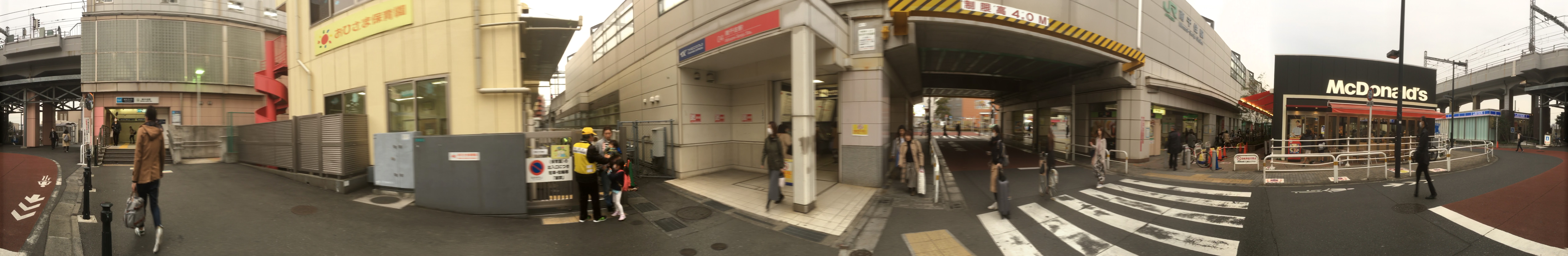
- The station buildings from all three lines seen at the same time, 2019

General information
- Location: 4 Minami-senju, Arakawa, Tokyo （東京都荒川区南千住4丁目） Japan
- Operator: JR East; Tokyo Metro; Metropolitan Intercity Railway Company
- Lines: Jōban Line (Rapid); Hibiya Line; Tsukuba Express
- Platforms: 1 island platform (JR East); 2 side platforms (Tokyo Metro); 2 side platforms (Tsukuba Express)

Other information
- Station code: H-21, JJ-04, 04

History
- Opened: 25 December 1896; 129 years ago

Services
Preceding station	JR East	Following station
Mikawashima JJ03 towards Shinagawa	Jōban Line (Rapid) Rapid	Kita-Senju JJ05 towards Toride
Mikawashima JJ03 towards Shinagawa	Jōban Line Local-Futsuu	Kita-Senju JJ05 towards Sendai
Preceding station	Tsukuba Express	Following station
Asakusa (TX03) towards Akihabara	Tsukuba Express Rapid Commuter-Rapid Semi-Rapid Local	Kita-Senju (TX05) towards Tsukuba
Preceding station	Tokyo Metro	Following station
Minowa towards Naka-meguro	Hibiya Line	Kita-Senju Terminus
Location

Minami-Senju Station (南千住駅, Minami-Senju-eki; "South Senju Station") is a railway station in Arakawa, Tokyo, Japan, operated by East Japan Railway Company (JR East), Tokyo Metro, and the Metropolitan Intercity Railway Company. The stations for each of these lines are located in separate buildings, necessitating crossing a road to reach each station's ticket exchange.

== Lines ==
Minami-Senju Station is served by the following lines.

- JR East: Jōban Line (JJ-04)
- Tokyo Metro: Hibiya Line (H-21)
- Metropolitan Intercity Railway Tsukuba Express (TX-04)

== Station layout ==
=== JR East ===
One elevated island platform serving two tracks.

1	■ Jōban Line (Rapid)	for Matsudo, Kashiwa, Abiko, Toride, Narita, Tsuchiura, Ishioka, and Mito
2	■ Jōban Line (Rapid)	for Nippori and Ueno; Ueno-Tokyo Line for Tokyo and Shinagawa

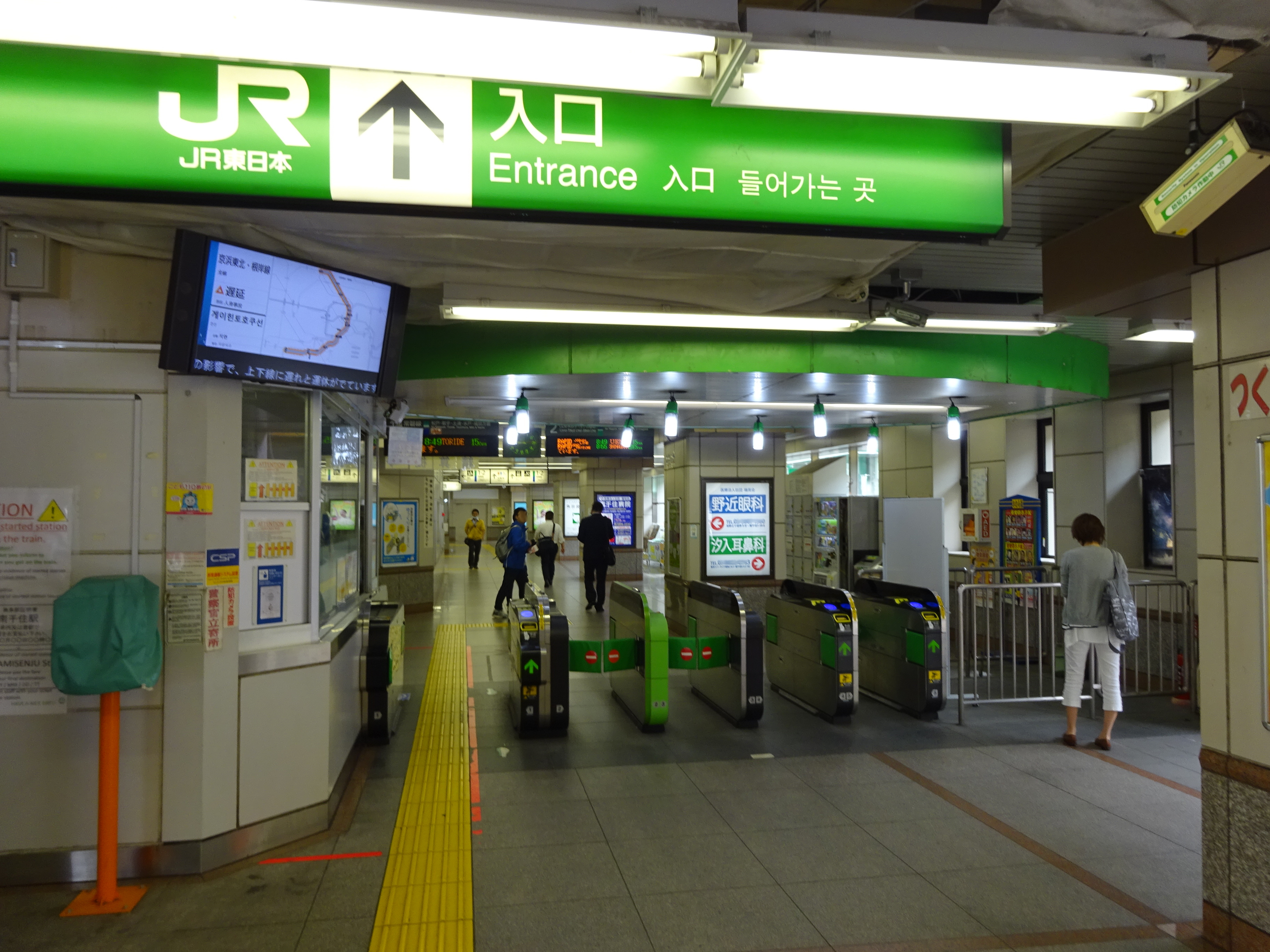
Jōban Line ticket gates

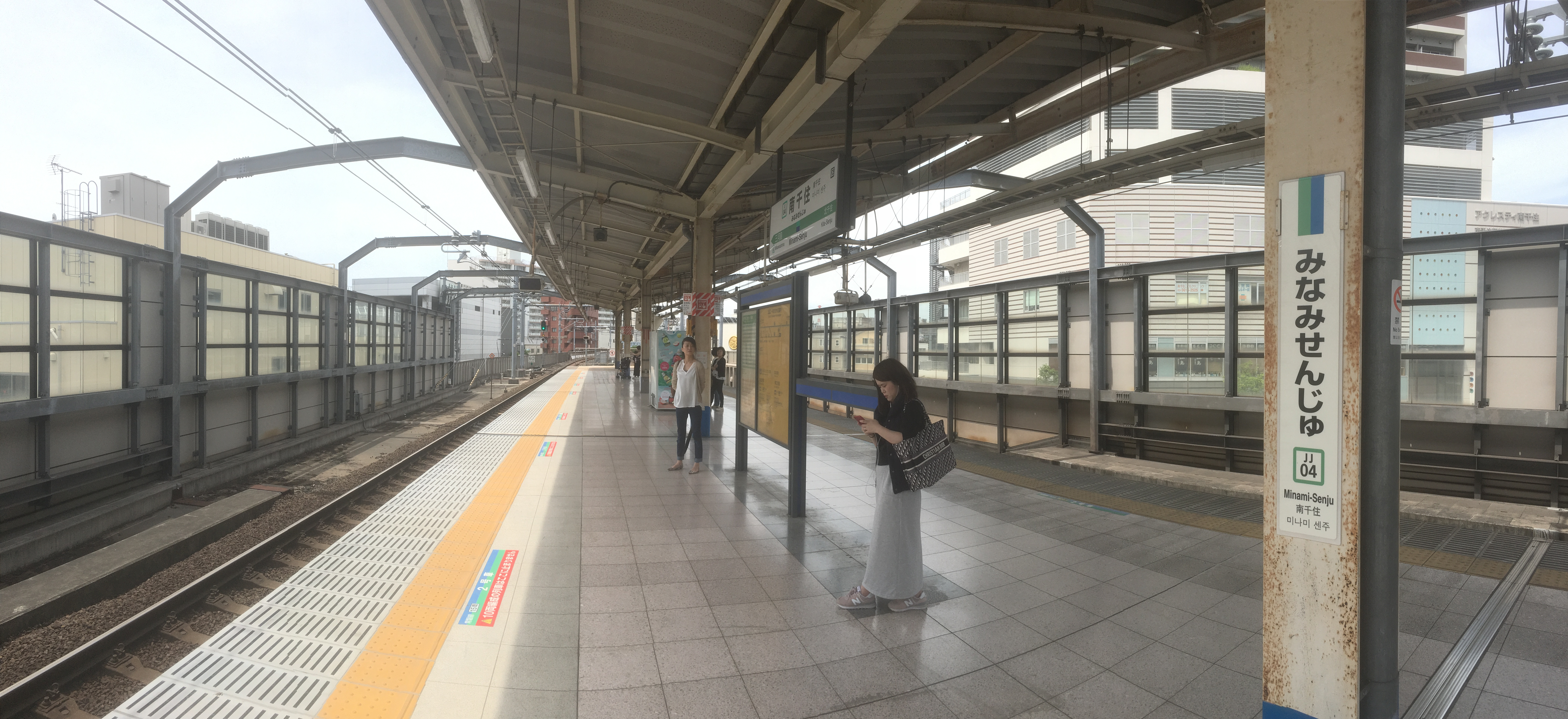
Jōban Line platforms, 2019

=== Tokyo Metro ===
Two elevated side platforms serving two tracks.

1	Hibiya Line	for Ueno, Ginza, and Naka-Meguro
2	Hibiya Line	for Kita-Senju; Tobu Skytree Line for Tōbu-Dōbutsu-Kōen; Tobu Nikko Line for Minami-Kurihashi

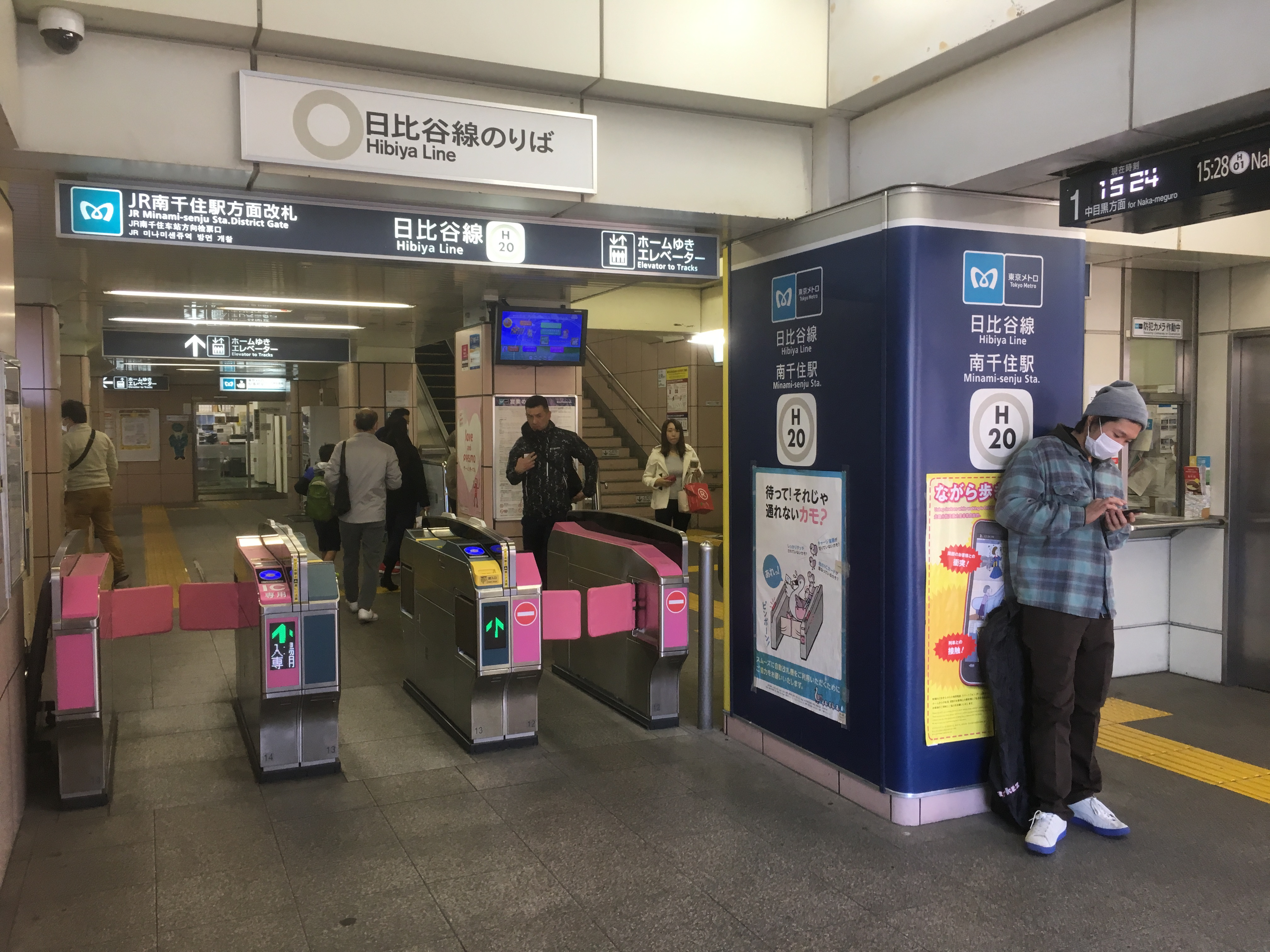
Hibiya Line ticket gate, 2019

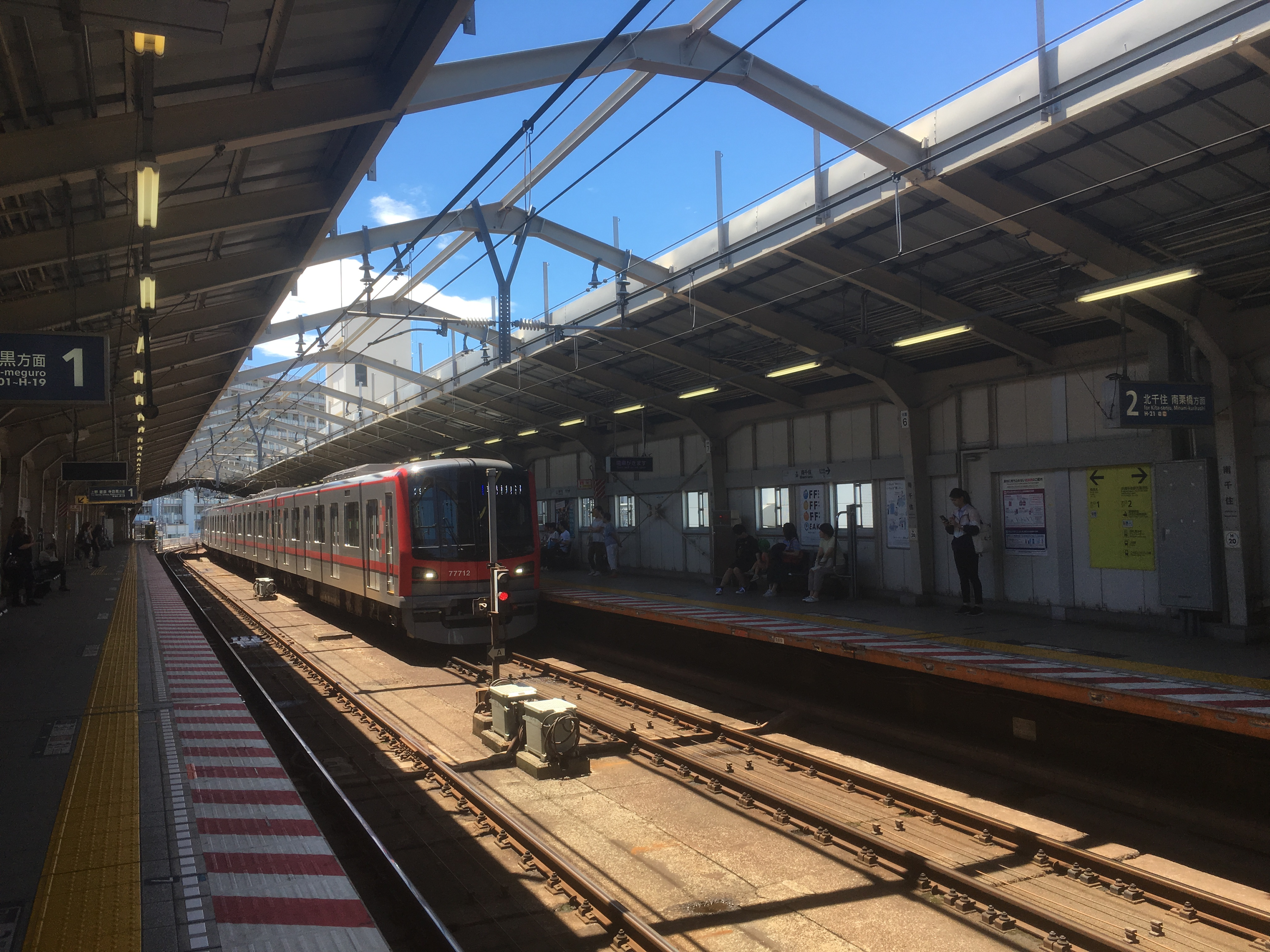
Hibiya Line platforms, 2019

=== Metropolitan Intercity Railway ===
Two underground side platforms serving two tracks.

1	Tsukuba Express	for Minami-Nagareyama, Moriya, and Tsukuba
2	Tsukuba Express	for Akihabara

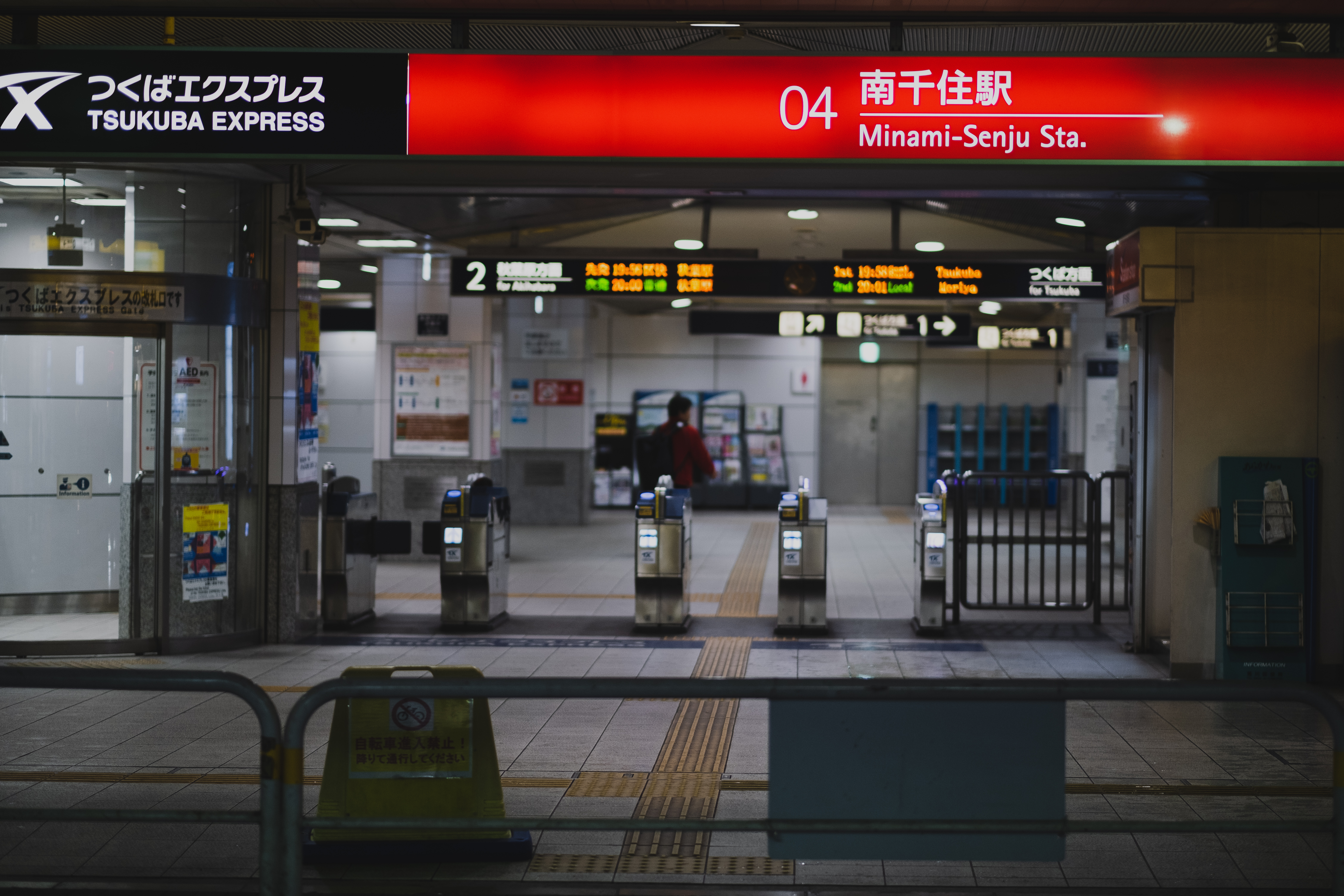
Tsukuba Express ticket gates, 2019

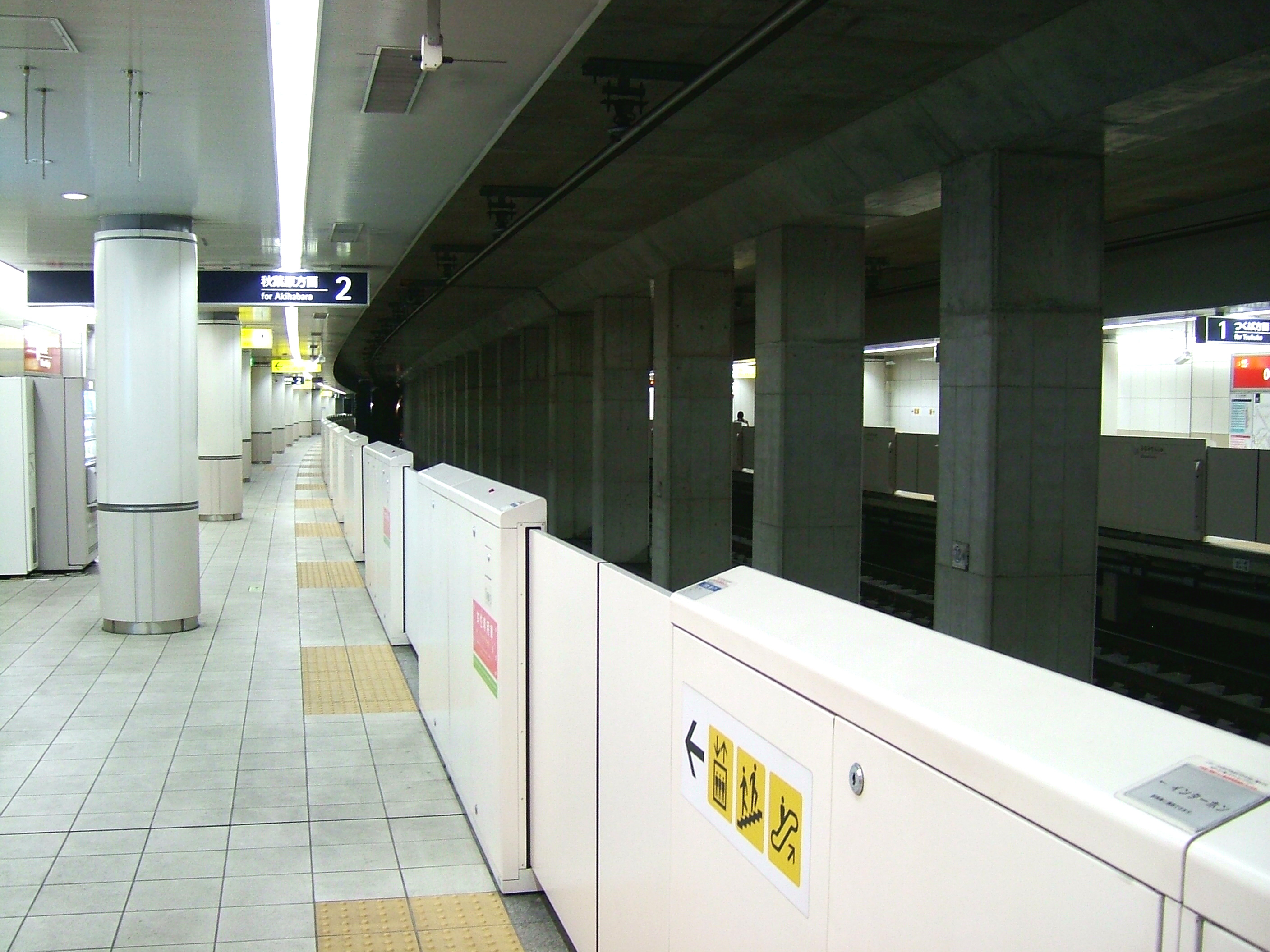
Tsukuba Express platforms, 2008

== History ==
The Jōban Line station opened on 25 December 1896.

The Hibiya Line station opened on 28 March 1961. The station facilities of this line were inherited by Tokyo Metro after the privatization of the Teito Rapid Transit Authority (TRTA) in 2004.

The Tsukuba Express station opened on 24 August 2005.

== Surrounding area ==
During the period between 1650 and 1873, the area was the location of the Kozukappara execution grounds. Between 100,000 and 200,000 people died here during the Tokugawa period. Near the south exit of the Tokyo Metro station, a small temple and burial ground commemorates this. Part of the burial grounds currently lie beneath the Hibiya Line tracks.

There are many cheap hotels in the area.

Other locations of note include:

- San'ya district
- National Route 4
- Sumidagawa Freight Terminal (JR Freight)
