= Minowa Station =

Metro station in Tokyo, Japan

Coordinates: 35.7298°N 139.7915°E

Minowa Station 三ノ輪駅

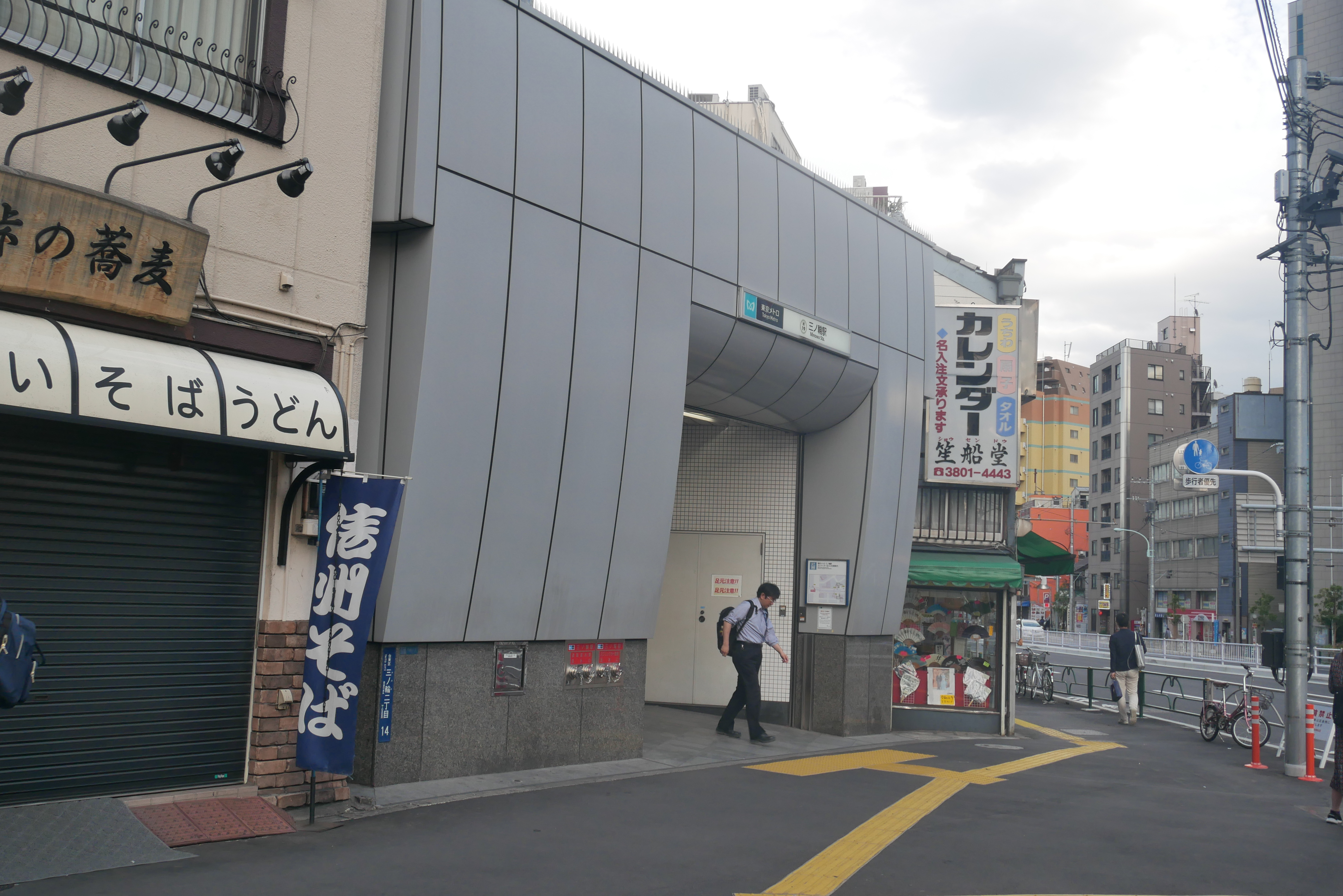
- Station entrance, June 2019

General information
- Location: 5-19-6 Negishi, Taito City, Tokyo; Japan
- Operator: Tokyo Metro
- Line: Hibiya Line
- Platforms: 2 side platforms
- Tracks: 2

Construction
- Structure type: Underground
- Accessible: Yes

Other information
- Status: Staffed
- Station code: H-20

History
- Opened: 28 March 1961; 65 years ago

Services
Preceding station	Tokyo Metro	Following station
Iriya towards Naka-meguro	Hibiya Line	Minami-Senju towards Kita-Senju
Location
- Location within Special wards of Tokyo Location within Tokyo Bay and Bōsō Peninsula Location within Tokyo Location within Japan

Minowa Station (三ノ輪駅, Minowa-eki) is a subway station in Taitō, Tokyo, Japan, operated by Tokyo Metro. It is close to Minowabashi Station on the Tokyo Sakura Tram.

== History ==
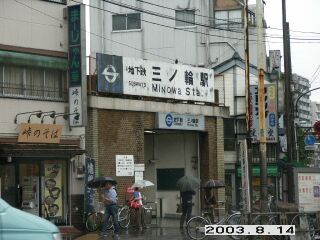
The station entrance in August 2003

The station opened on 28 March 1961, as part of the original five-station section of the Hibiya line from Naka-Okachimachi to Minami-Senju.

The station facilities were inherited by Tokyo Metro after the privatization of the Teito Rapid Transit Authority (TRTA) in 2004.

In the 2015 data available from Japan’s Ministry of Land, Infrastructure, Transport and Tourism, Minowa → Iriya was one of the train segments among Tokyo's most crowded train lines during rush hour.

== Lines ==
Minowa Station is served by the Hibiya Line, and is 2.9 km from the northern starting point of the line at Kita-Senju. Since the opening of Toranomon Hills on 6 June 2020, the station code is H-20.

== Station layout ==
The station consists of two opposed side platforms serving two tracks.

=== Platforms ===
1	Hibiya Line	for Ueno, Ginza, and Naka-Meguro
2	Hibiya Line	for Kita-Senju; Tobu Skytree Line for Tōbu-Dōbutsu-Kōen; Tobu Nikko Line for Minami-Kurihashi

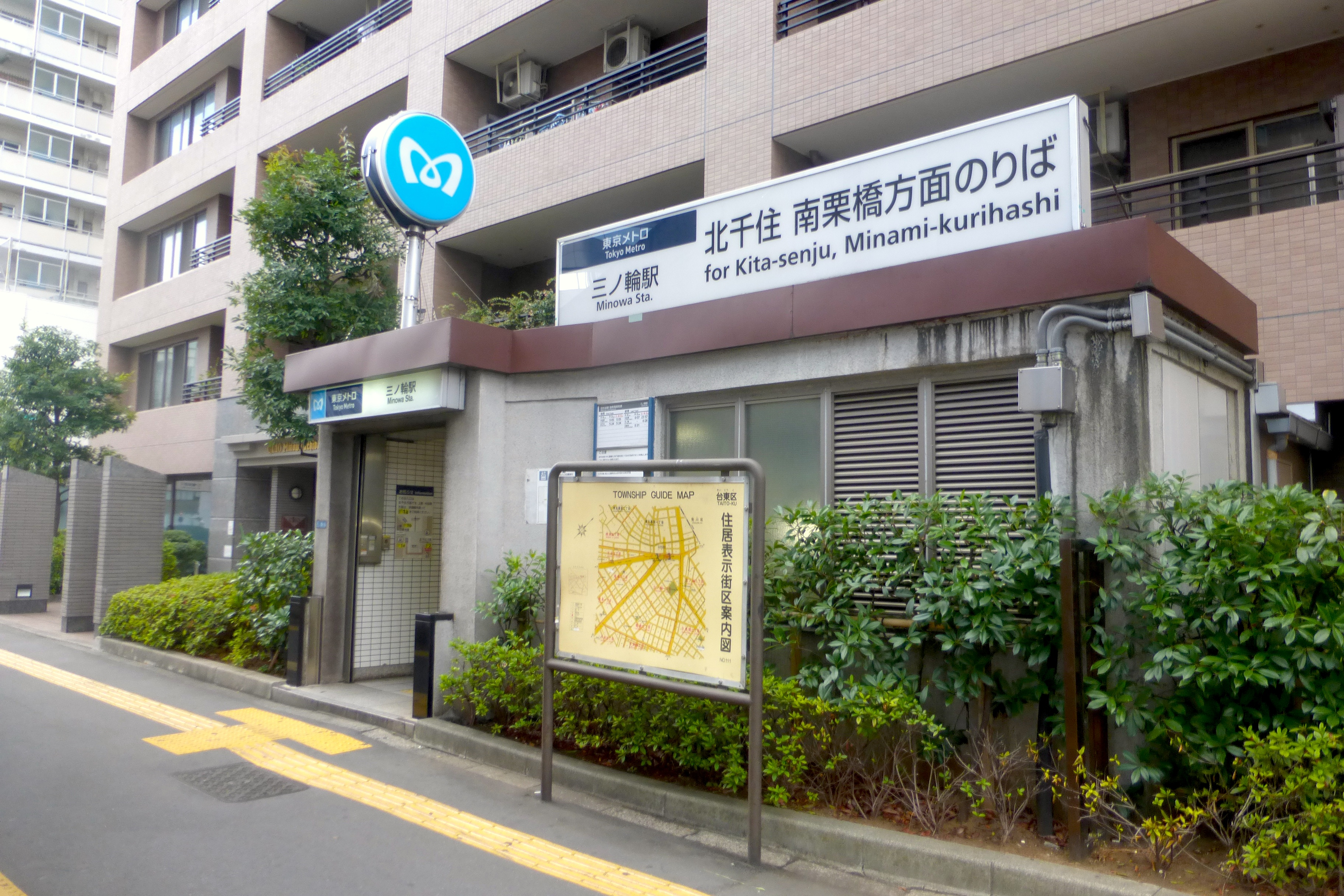
Entrance No.2, August 2015

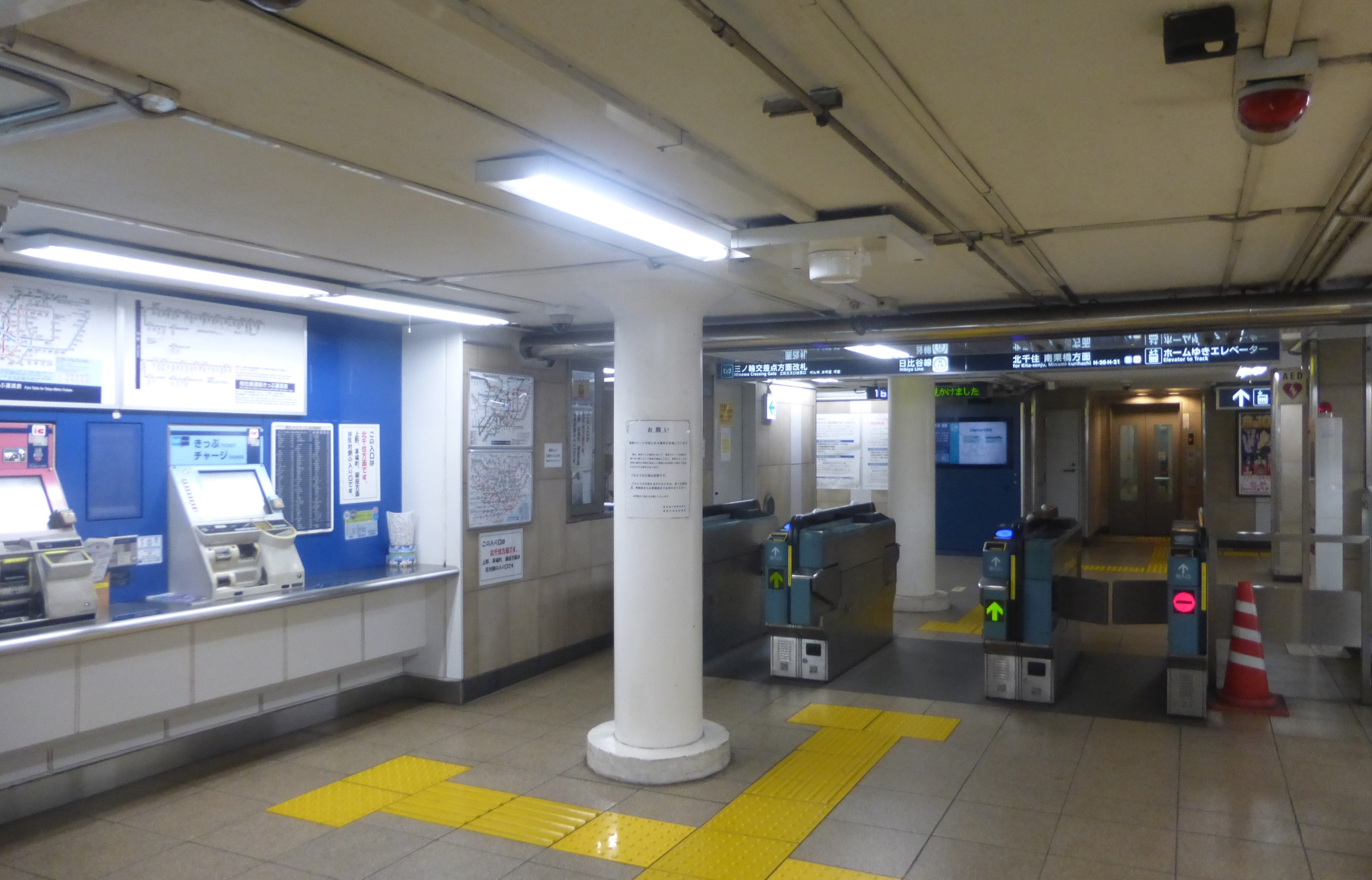
The ticket barriers, August 2015

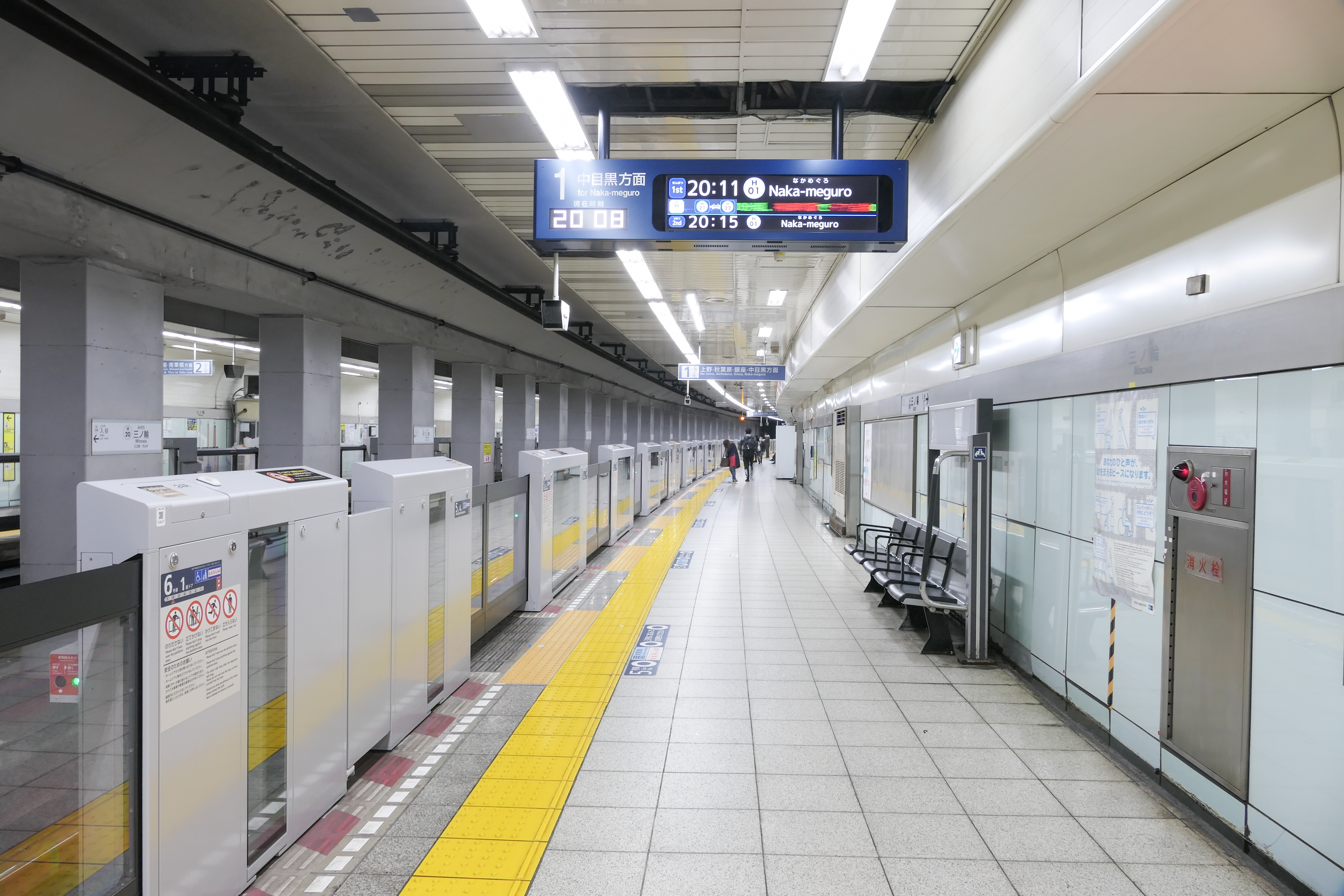
A view of the platforms, April 2024

== Surrounding area ==
- Minowabashi Station (Tokyo Sakura Tram) (approximately 5 minutes' walk)
- San'ya district
- Yoshiwara district
