= Hibiya Line =

Subway line in Tokyo, Japan

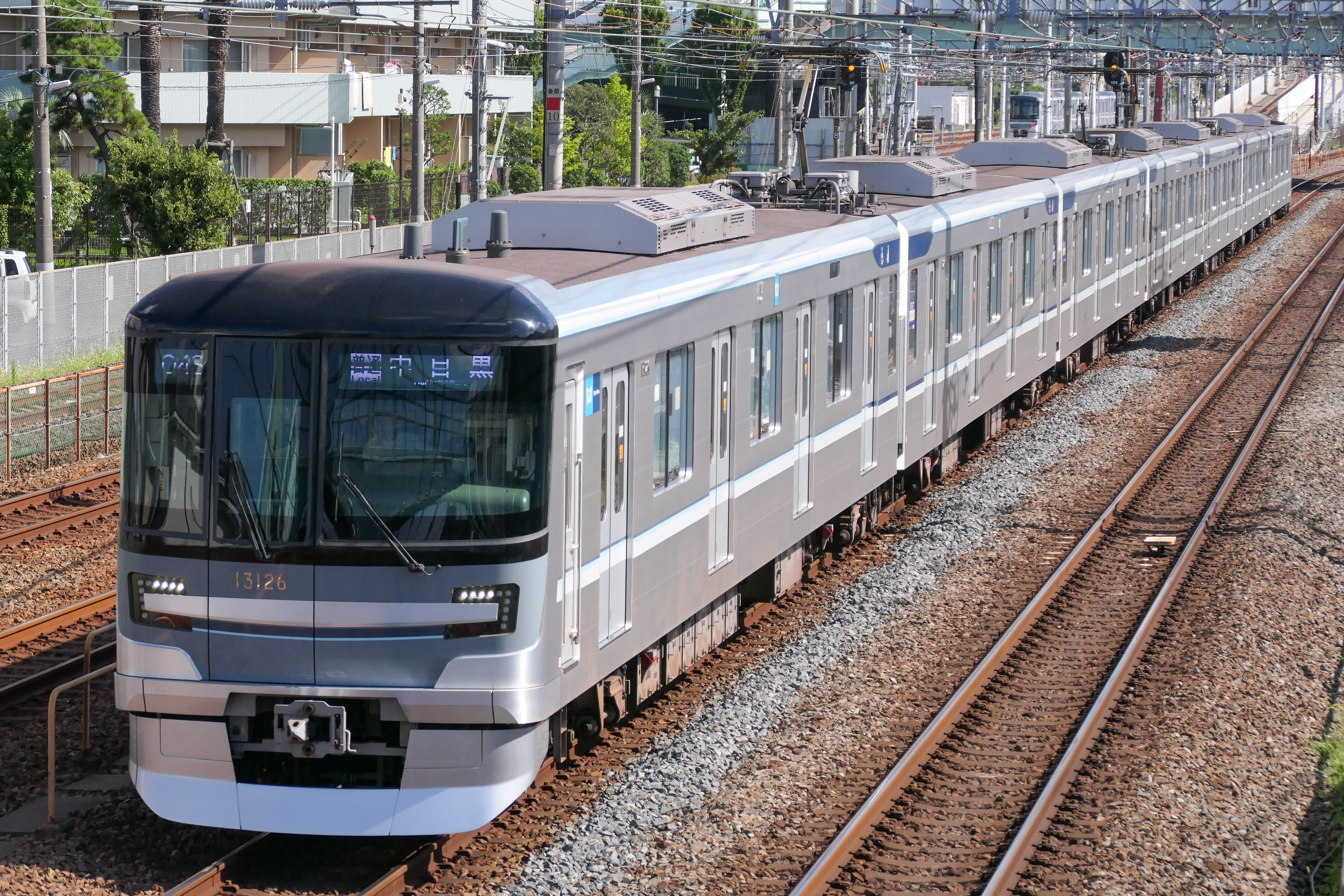
- A Hibiya Line 13000 series train in 2019

Overview
- Other name: Line 2
- Native name: 日比谷線
- Status: In service
- Owner: Tokyo Metro Co., Ltd.
- Line number: H
- Locale: Tokyo
- Termini: Naka-Meguro; Kita-Senju
- Stations: 22
- Color on map: Silver

Service
- Type: Rapid transit
- System: Tokyo subway (Tokyo Metro)
- Operator(s): Tokyo Metro Co., Ltd.
- Depot(s): Senju, Takenotsuka
- Rolling stock: Tokyo Metro 13000 series Tobu 70000 series
- Daily ridership: 1,213,492 (2017)

History
- Opened: 28 March 1961; 65 years ago
- Last extension: 1964

Technical
- Line length: 20.3 km (12.6 mi)
- Track gauge: 1,067 mm (3 ft 6 in)
- Minimum radius: 126.896 m (416.33 ft)
- Electrification: Overhead line, 1,500 V DC
- Operating speed: 80 km/h (50 mph)
- Train protection system: New CS-ATC
- Maximum incline: 3.9%

The Hibiya Line (日比谷線, Hibiya-sen) is a subway line in Tokyo, Japan, owned and operated by Tokyo Metro. The line was named after the Hibiya area in Chiyoda's Yurakucho district, under which it passes. On maps, diagrams and signboards, the line is shown using the color silver, and its stations are given numbers using the letter "H".

== Overview ==
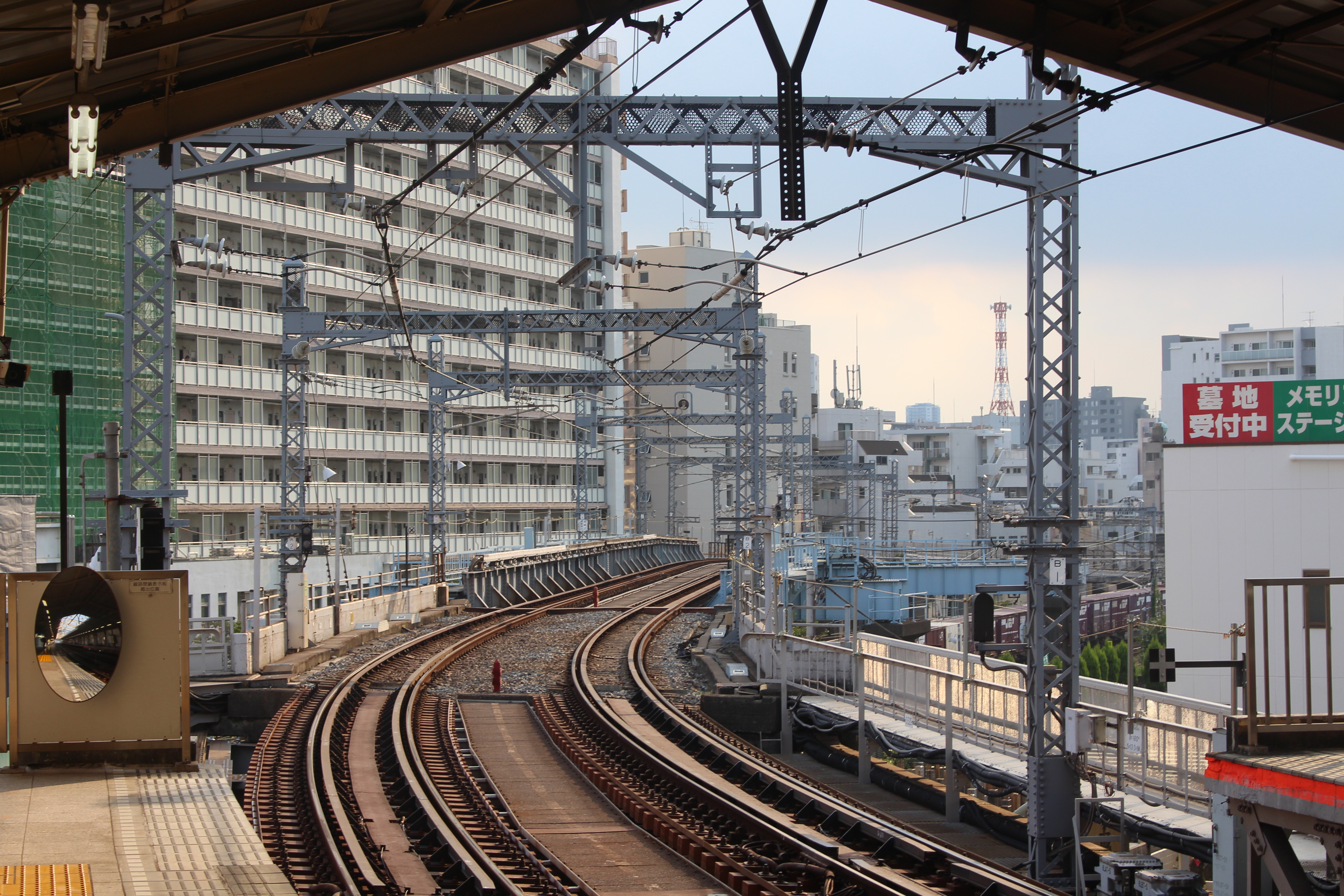
View of the tracks from Minami-Senju Station

The Hibiya Line runs between Naka-Meguro in Meguro and Kita-Senju in Adachi. The line's path is somewhat similar to that of the Ginza Line; however, the Hibiya Line was designed to serve a number of important districts, such as Ebisu, Roppongi, Tsukiji, Kayabachō and Senju, which were not on an existing line.

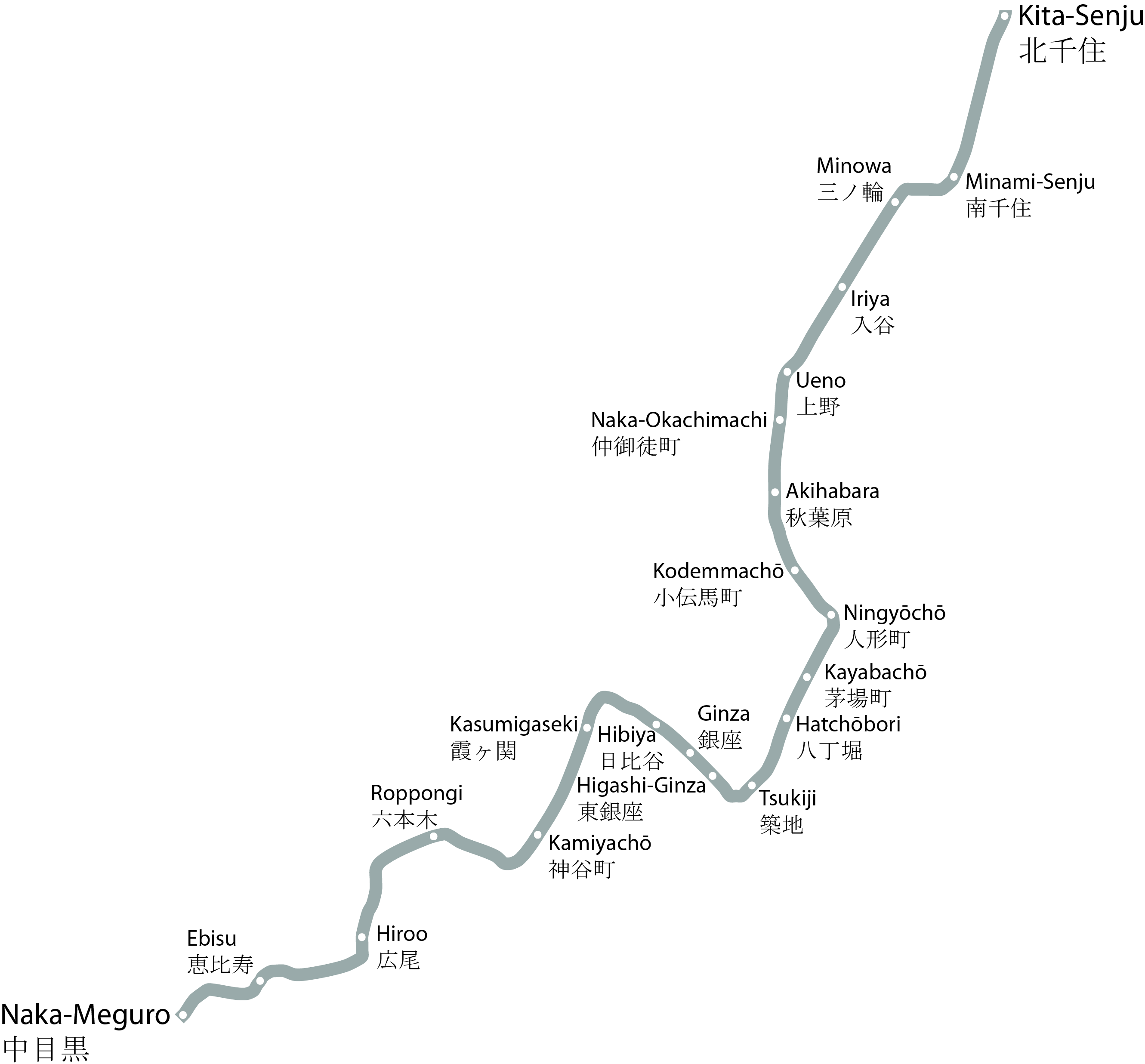
The Hibiya Line

The Hibiya Line became the first line operated by Tokyo Metro to offer through services with a private railway, and the second Tokyo subway line overall after the Toei Asakusa Line. It is connected to the Tobu Skytree Line at Kita-Senju, and through services operate between Naka-Meguro and Tōbu-Dōbutsu-Kōen on the Tobu Skytree Line, and onward to Minami-Kurihashi on the Tobu Nikko Line. Some peak-hour services terminate at Takenotsuka, Kita-Koshigaya or Kita-Kasukabe on the Tobu Skytree Line. Despite its name, the through service does not stop anywhere near the Tokyo Skytree.

The line is the first subway line overall to use 1,067 mm (3 ft 6 in) narrow gauge (as previous lines used standard gauge), and all subsequent lines operated by Tokyo Metro were built to this gauge to accommodate through services. (Of all subway lines built since the Hibiya Line, only the Ginza, Marunouchi, Asakusa, Shinjuku, and Ōedo lines were not built to this gauge.)

According to the Tokyo Metropolitan Bureau of Transportation, as of June 2009 the Hibiya Line is the eighth most crowded subway line in Tokyo, running at 164%^{[a]} capacity between Minowa and Iriya stations.

On maps, diagrams and signboards, the line is shown using the color silver, and its stations are numbered with the prefix "H".

As the old trains which have mixture of three and five doors per car have been retired, platform gates are now being installed as of 14 April 2020 with unified door arrangements of four doors per car. This also reflects with the reduction of eight-car train to seven-car trainset due to the longer 20 m (65 ft 7 in) per car trainset instead of the older 18 m (59 ft 1 in) per car trainset, which resulted in 1% reduction in capacity per train.

A reserved seat limited stop liner service known as the TH Liner commenced service since 6 June 2020 and stop at selected stations along the Hibiya Line and the Tobu lines.

== History ==
=== Planning ===
In 1925, the original plan for what is now the Hibiya Line was included in the five-line subway plan designated by the Ministry of Home Affairs Notification No. 56 of 1925 (大正14年内務省告示第56号), the Hibiya Line, then the Line 2 was outlined as a 16.1 km (10 mi) underground route connecting "Meguro – Nishikubo – Iwaidacho – Hongokucho – Asakusaabashi – Tawaramachi – Minami-senju".

Tokyo City obtained route licenses for Lines 3 and 4, but construction approval was denied due to opposition from the Ministry of Home Affairs and the Ministry of Finance over the city's heavy public debt. No further construction plans were pursued thereafter. In 1941, all route licenses held by the Tokyo City Government were transferred to the newly established Teito Rapid Transit Authority for a fee.

==== Postwar planning ====
After the World War II, on December 7, 1946, the War Damage Reconstruction Board (戦災復興院) issued Notification No. 252 (戦災復興院告示第252号), which revised Line 2 as originally designated by the Ministry of Home Affairs in 1925. In response, the Teito Rapid Transit Authority applied on April 28, 1949, to amend its business plan to bring its licensed routes into conformity with Notification No. 252, and the revision was approved on May 23 of the same year. The proposed 23.8 km (14.8 mi) route was as follows:

- Yutenji – Ebisu – Atagocho – Toranomon – Nagatacho – Kudankami – Kanda – Asakusabashi – Tawaramachi – Minowacho – Kita-Senju
- Asakusabashi – Kinshicho (as a branch line)

Subsequently, based on Urban Transportation Council Recommendation No.1 (都市交通審議会答申第1号), issued by the Ministry of Construction, the Teito Rapid Transit Authority decided on May 18, 1957, to commence construction of the planned Line 2 (the Hibiya Line) and the planned Line 4 (then the Ogikubo Line, now the Marunouchi Line). Its basic plan was to connect Naka-Meguro in southwest Tokyo with Kita-Koshigaya in the northeast. The full northeastern extension of the line was never built, as the Tobu Railway upgraded to quadruple track within the same corridor to meet capacity demands.

=== Construction ===
The Hibiya Line was the fourth subway line built in Tokyo after the Ginza Line, Marunouchi Line, and Toei Asakusa Line.

Work began in 1959, with the original section from Minami-Senju to Naka-okachimachi Station opening in March 1961. The line opened in stages: the northern section was operational in May 1962 between Kita-Senju and Ningyōchō and in February 1963 between Ningyōchō and Higashi-ginza; the southern section, between Naka-Meguro and Kasumigaseki, opened in March 1964.

The final segment, bridging Higashi-Ginza and Kasumigaseki, opened on 29 August 1964, just weeks before the opening ceremony for the 1964 Summer Olympics. Through service to the Tōkyū Tōyoko Line also began operations on this date. This was something of a coup for the Teito Rapid Transit Authority (the predecessor of today's Tokyo Metro), as the Toei Asakusa Line, which was also to be completed in time for the Olympics, had fallen behind schedule and remained under construction for the duration of the Games.

The Hibiya Line was one of the lines targeted in the 1995 Aum sarin gas attack.

On 8 March 2000, five people were killed and 63 were injured when a derailed Hibiya Line train was sideswiped by a second train near Naka-Meguro Station.

The line, station facilities, rolling stock, and other assets were inherited by Tokyo Metro after the privatization of the Teito Rapid Transit Authority (TRTA) in 2004.

16 March 2013 marked the end of through services with Tōkyū Tōyoko Line. All Hibiya Line trains now terminate at Naka-Meguro Station.

== Stations ==
List of Hibiya line stations

- All stations are located in Tokyo.

No.	Station	Japanese	Distance (km)		Transfers	Location
No.	Station	Japanese	Between stations	From H-01	Transfers	Location
H-01	Naka-meguro (Note: Naka-meguro is shared by both Tokyu and Tokyo Metro; Tokyu manages the station.)	中目黒	-	0.0	Tōyoko Line (TY03)	Meguro
H-02	Ebisu	恵比寿	1.0	1.0	Yamanote Line (JY21); Saikyō Line (JA09); Shōnan–Shinjuku Line (JS18)	Shibuya
H-03	Hiro-o	広尾	1.5	2.5		Minato
H-04	Roppongi	六本木	1.7	4.2	Namboku Line (Roppongi-itchome: N-05); Ōedo Line (E-23)	Minato
H-05	Kamiyacho	神谷町	1.5	5.7		Minato
H-06	Toranomon Hills	虎ノ門ヒルズ	0.8	6.5	Ginza Line (Toranomon: G-07); Tokyo BRT	Minato
H-07	Kasumigaseki	霞ケ関	0.5	7.0	Marunouchi Line (M-15); Chiyoda Line (C-08)	Chiyoda
H-08	Hibiya	日比谷	1.2	8.2	Chiyoda Line (C-09); Yūrakuchō Line (Yurakucho: Y-18); Mita Line (I-08); Yamanote Line (Yūrakuchō: JY30); Keihin–Tōhoku Line (Yūrakuchō: JK25)	Chiyoda
H-09	Ginza	銀座	0.4	8.6	Ginza Line (G-09); Marunouchi Line (M-16); Yūrakuchō Line (Ginza-itchome: Y-19)	Chūō
H-10	Higashi-ginza	東銀座	0.4	9.0	Asakusa Line (A-11)	Chūō
H-11	Tsukiji	築地	0.6	9.6	Yūrakuchō Line (Shintomicho: Y-20)	Chūō
H-12	Hatchobori	八丁堀	1.0	10.6	Keiyō Line (JE02)	Chūō
H-13	Kayabacho	茅場町	0.5	11.1	Tōzai Line (T-11)	Chūō
H-14	Ningyocho	人形町	0.9	12.0	Asakusa Line (A-14); Hanzōmon Line (Suitengumae: Z-10)	Chūō
H-15	Kodemmacho	小伝馬町	0.6	12.6		Chūō
H-16	Akihabara	秋葉原	0.9	13.5	Shinjuku Line (Iwamotocho: S-08); Yamanote Line (JY03); Keihin–Tōhoku Line (JK28); Chūō–Sōbu Line (JB19); Tsukuba Express (TX01)	Chiyoda
H-17	Naka-okachimachi	仲御徒町	1.0	14.5	Ginza Line (Ueno-hirokoji: G-15); Chiyoda Line (Yushima: C-13); Ōedo Line (Ueno-okachimachi: E-09); Tsukuba Express (Shin-okachimachi: TX02); Yamanote Line (Okachimachi: JY04); Keihin–Tōhoku Line (Okachimachi: JK29)	Taitō
H-18	Ueno	上野	0.5	15.0	Ginza Line (G-16); Tōhoku Shinkansen; Yamagata Shinkansen; Akita Shinkansen; Hokkaidō Shinkansen; Jōetsu Shinkansen; Hokuriku Shinkansen; Yamanote Line (JY05); Keihin–Tōhoku Line (JK30); Utsunomiya Line/Takasaki Line (JU02); Jōban Line (Rapid) (JJ01); Ueno-Tokyo Line (JU02); Main Line (Keisei Ueno: KS01)	Taitō
H-19	Iriya	入谷	1.2	16.2		Taitō
H-20	Minowa	三ノ輪	1.2	17.4	Toden Arakawa Line (Minowabashi: SA01)	Taitō
H-21	Minami-senju	南千住	0.8	18.2	Jōban Line (Rapid) (JJ04); Tsukuba Express (TX04)	Arakawa
H-22	Kita-senju (Note: Kita-senju is shared by both Tobu Railway and Tokyo Metro; Tobu Railway manages the station.)	北千住	2.1	20.3	Chiyoda Line (C-18); Jōban Line (Rapid) (JJ05); Tobu Skytree Line (TS09); Tsukuba Express (TX05)	Adachi
↓ Through-services to/from: ↓: Takenotsuka, Kita-Koshigaya, Kita-Kasukabe, Tōbu-Dōbutsu-Kōen via Tobu Skytree Line; Minami-Kurihashi via Nikkō Line; Limited Home Liner TH Liner to/from Kuki via Isesaki Line

== Rolling stock ==
- Tokyo Metro 13000 series (7-car EMUs, since 25 March 2017)
- Tobu 70000 series (7-car EMUs, since 7 July 2017)
- Tobu 70090 series (7-car EMUs since 20 March 2020, for TH Liner)
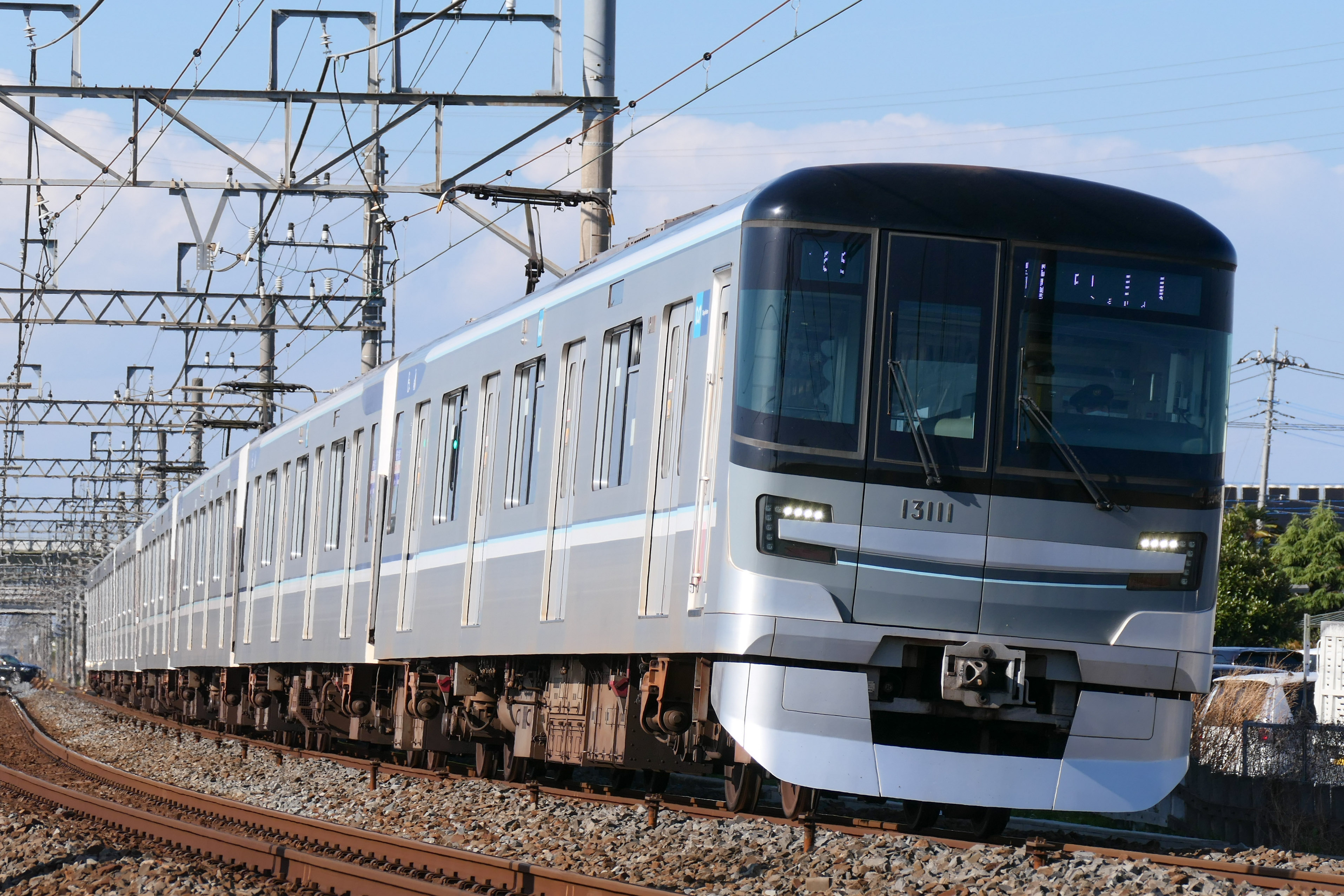
Tokyo Metro 13000 series

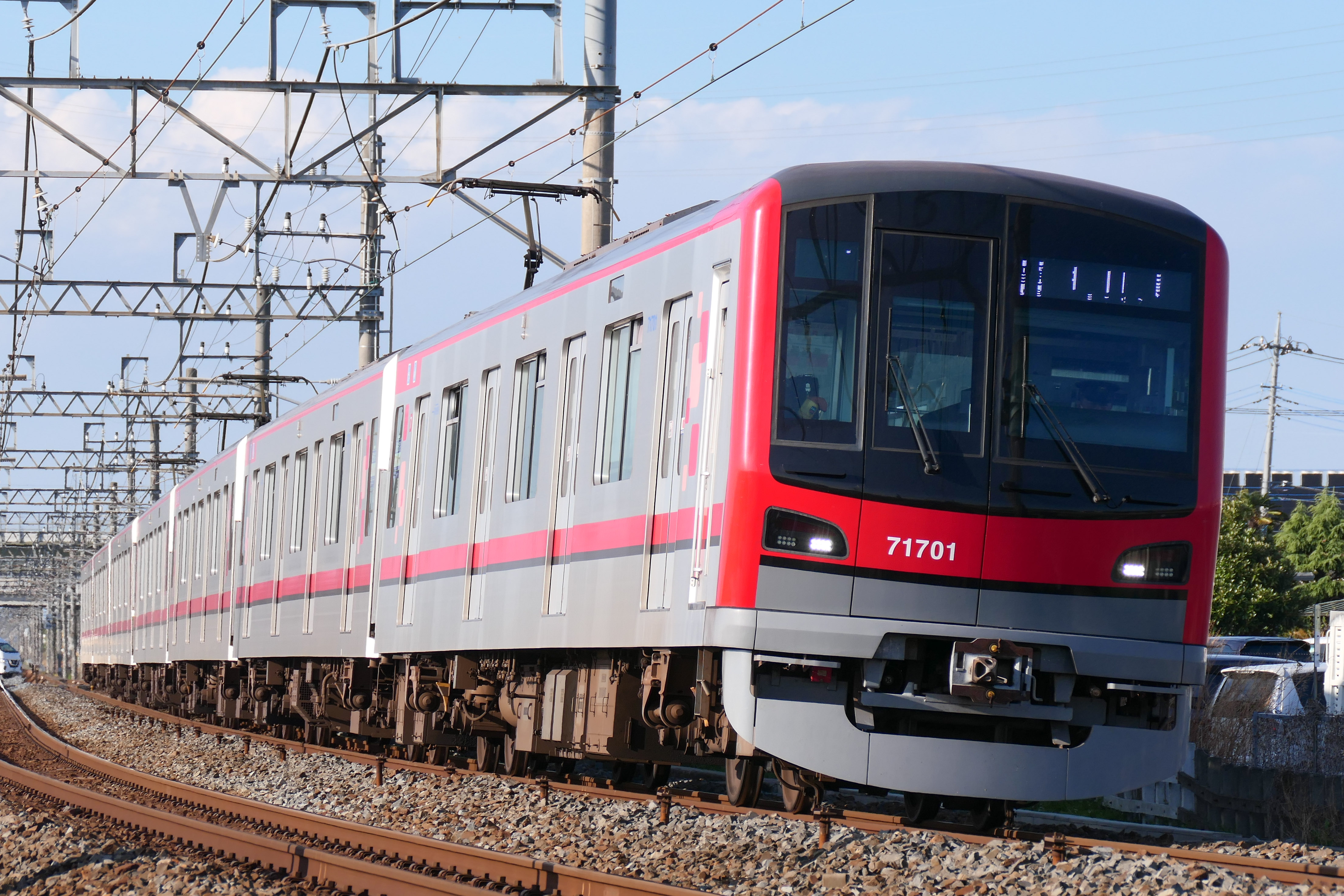
Tobu 70000 series

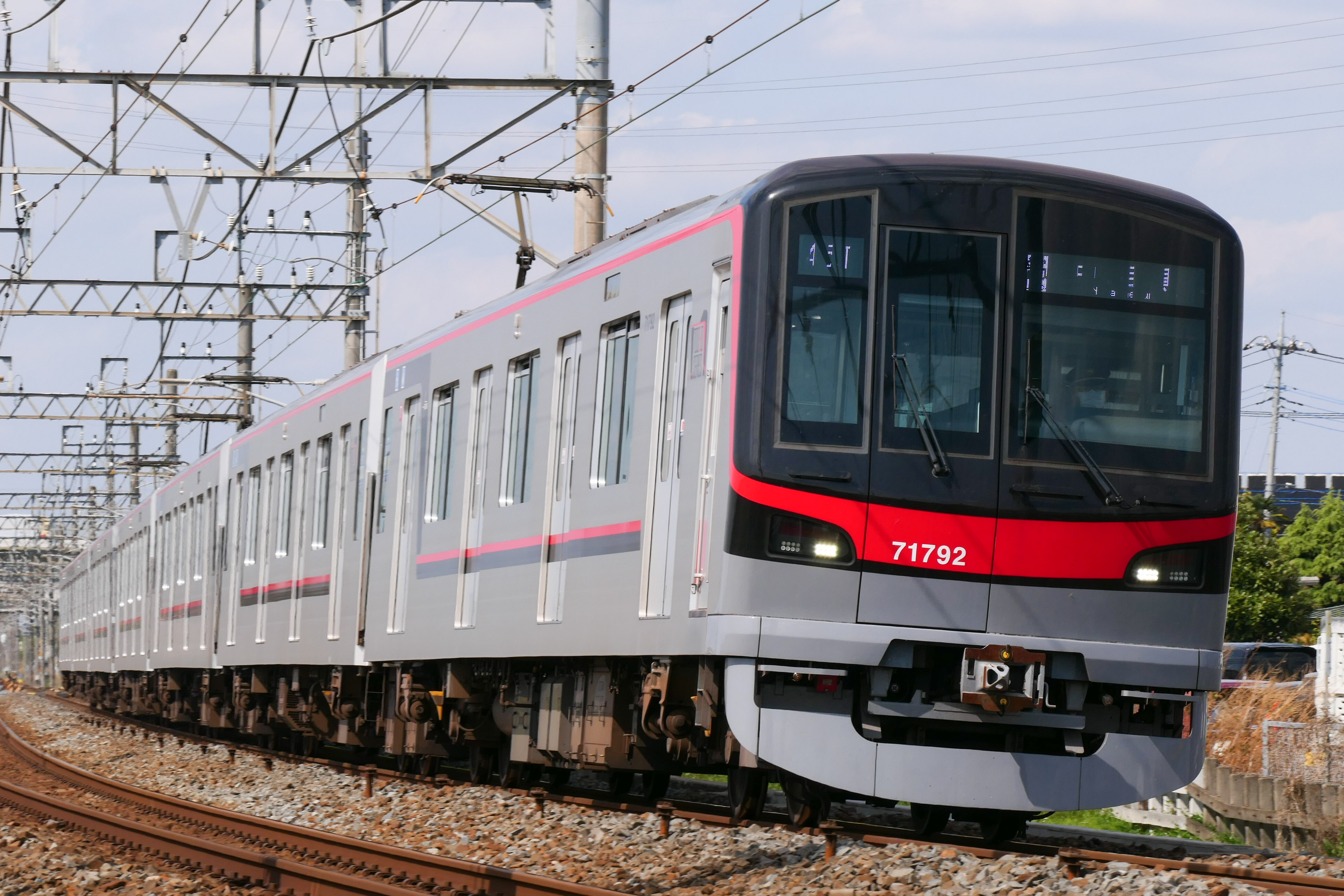
Tobu 70090 series

=== Past ===
- TRTA 3000 series (from 1961 until July 1994)
- Tobu 2000 series (from 1962 until 1993)
- Tokyu 7000 series (original) (from 1964 until March 1991)
- Tokyu 1000 series (from 1991 until September 2013)
- Tokyo Metro 03 series (from 1988 until March 2020)
- Tobu 20000 series (8-car EMUs, 1988 until February 2020)
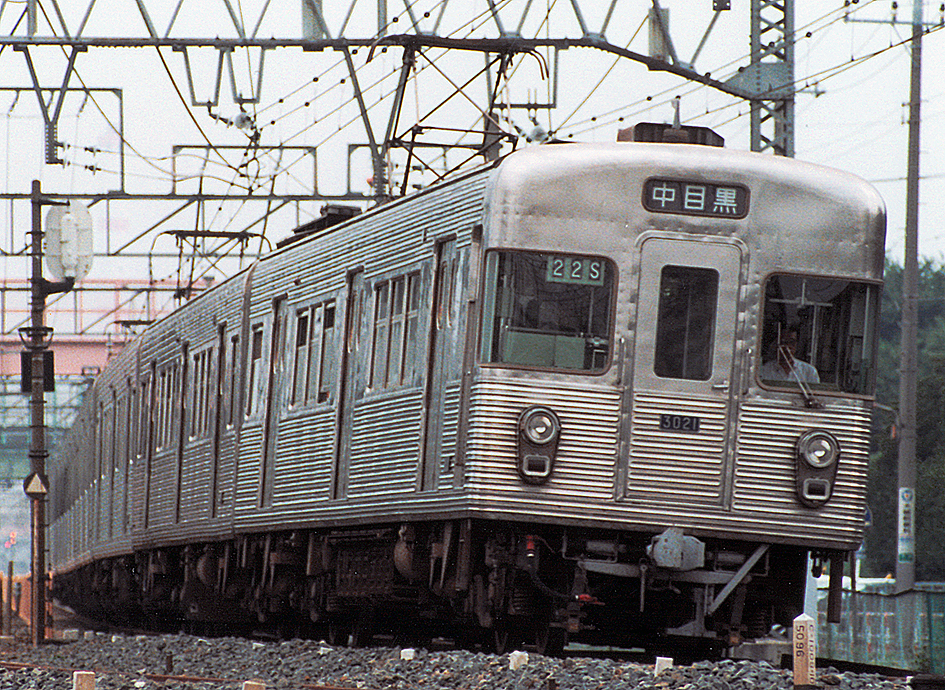
TRTA 3000 series in 1988

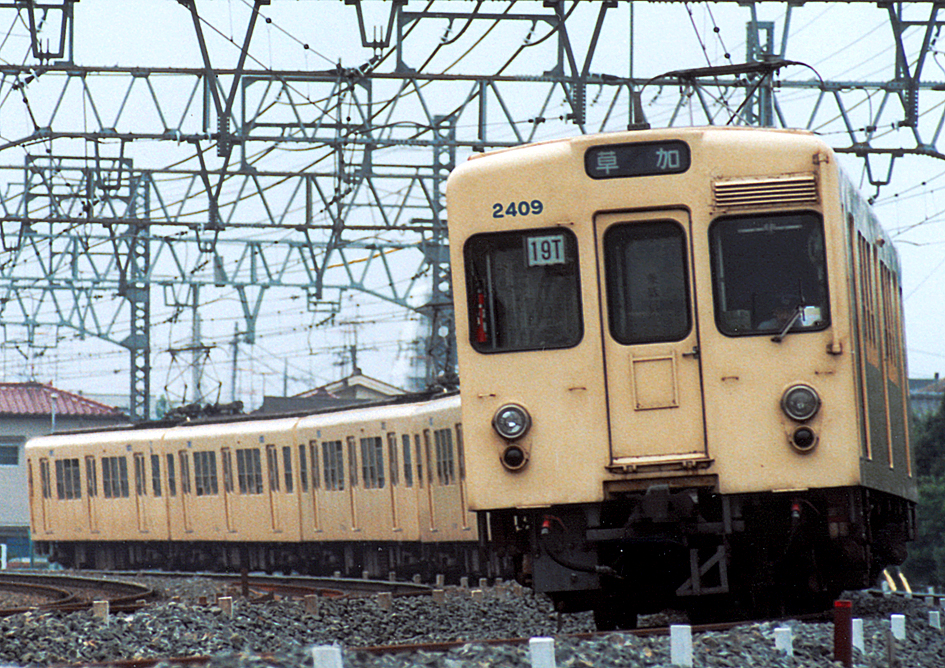
Tobu 2000 series

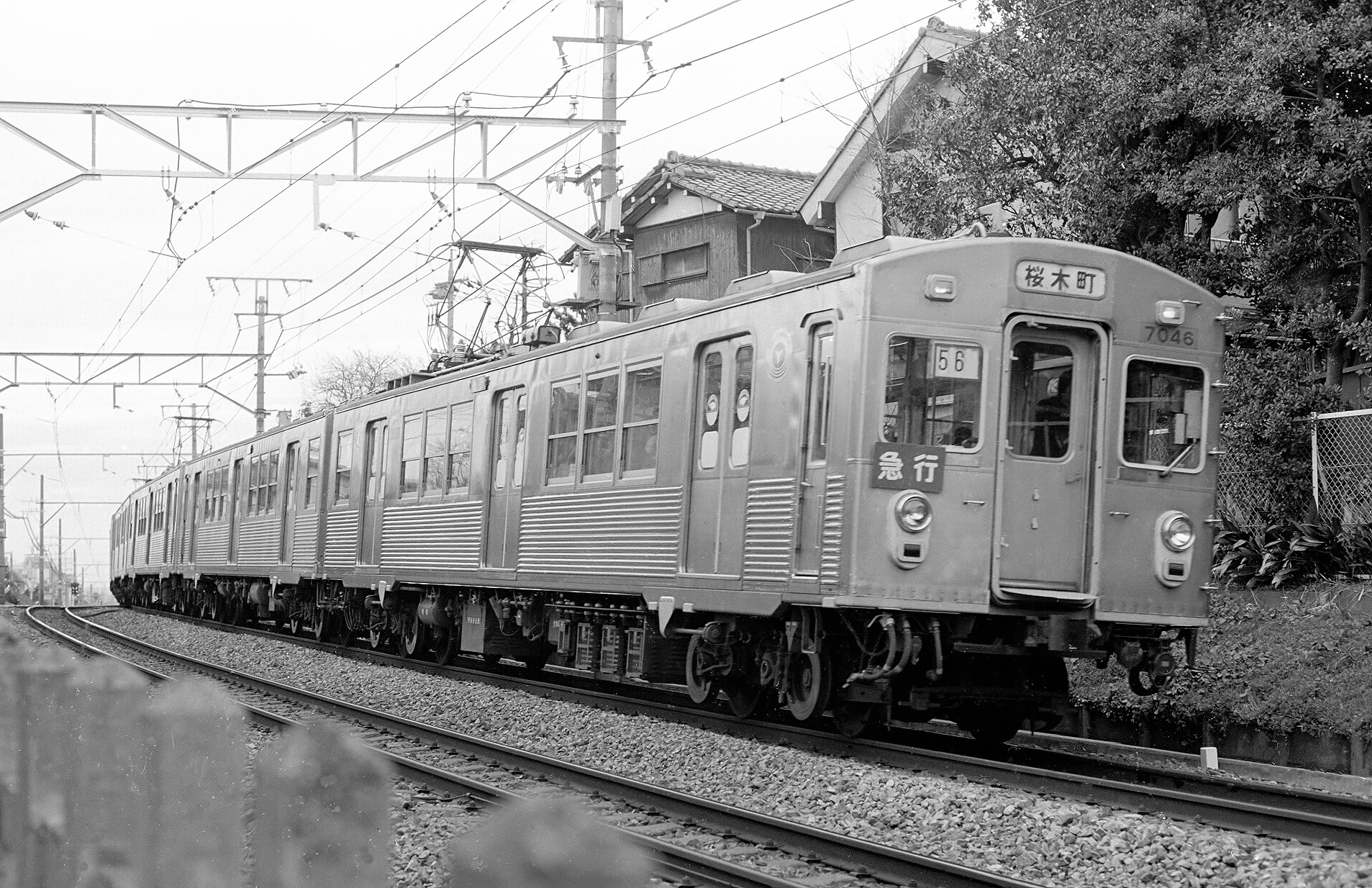
Tokyu 7000 series

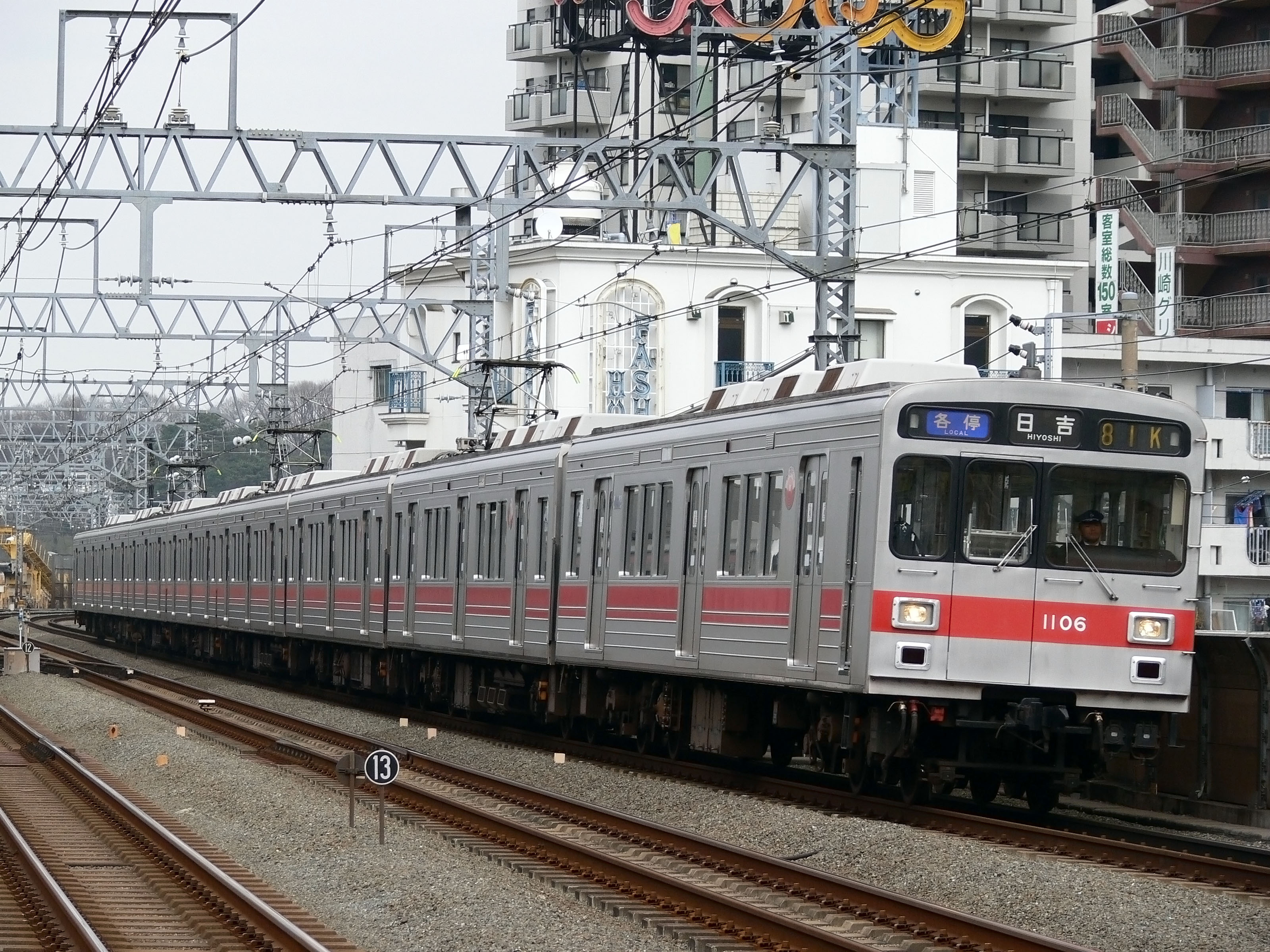
Tokyu 1000 series

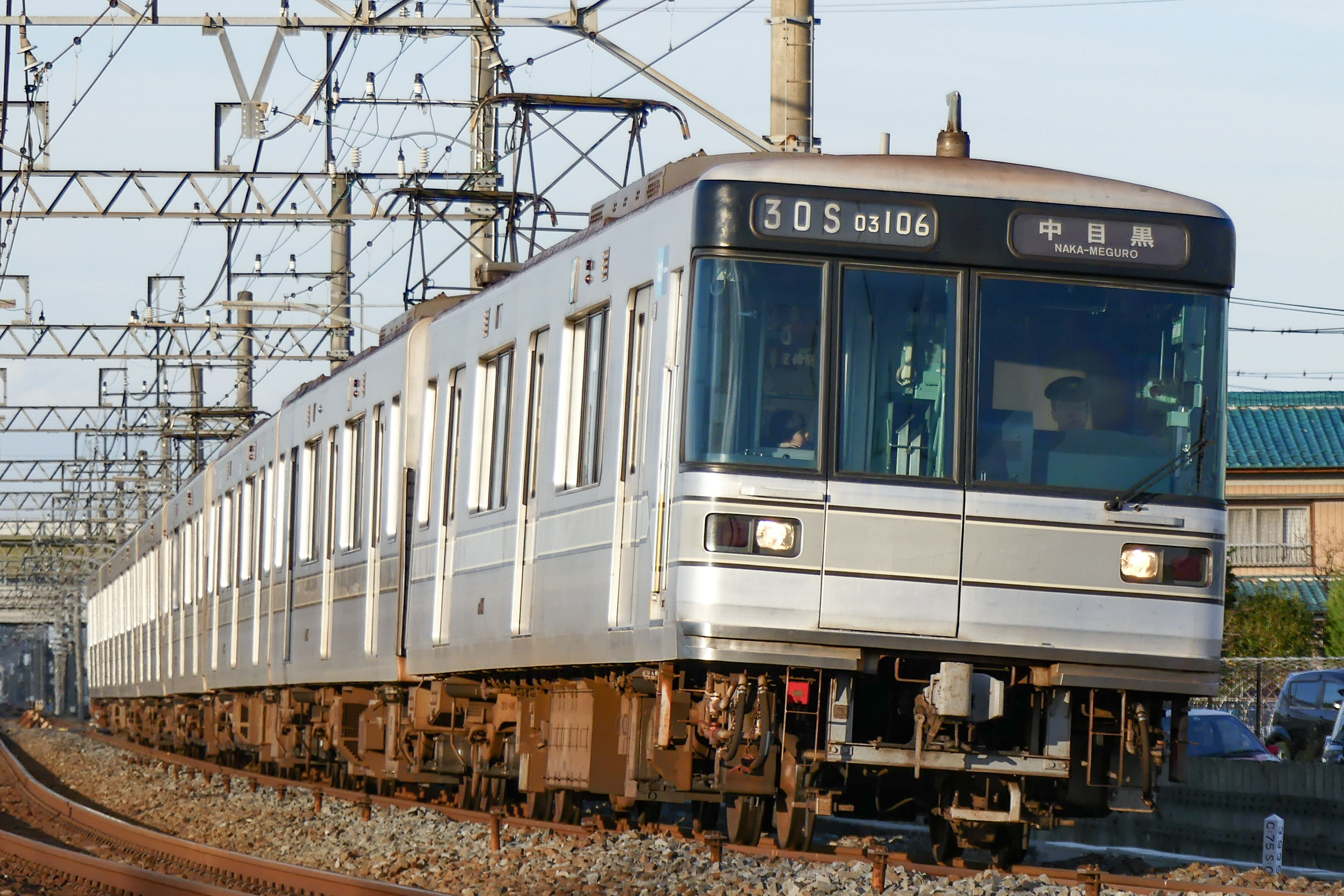
Tokyo Metro 03 series

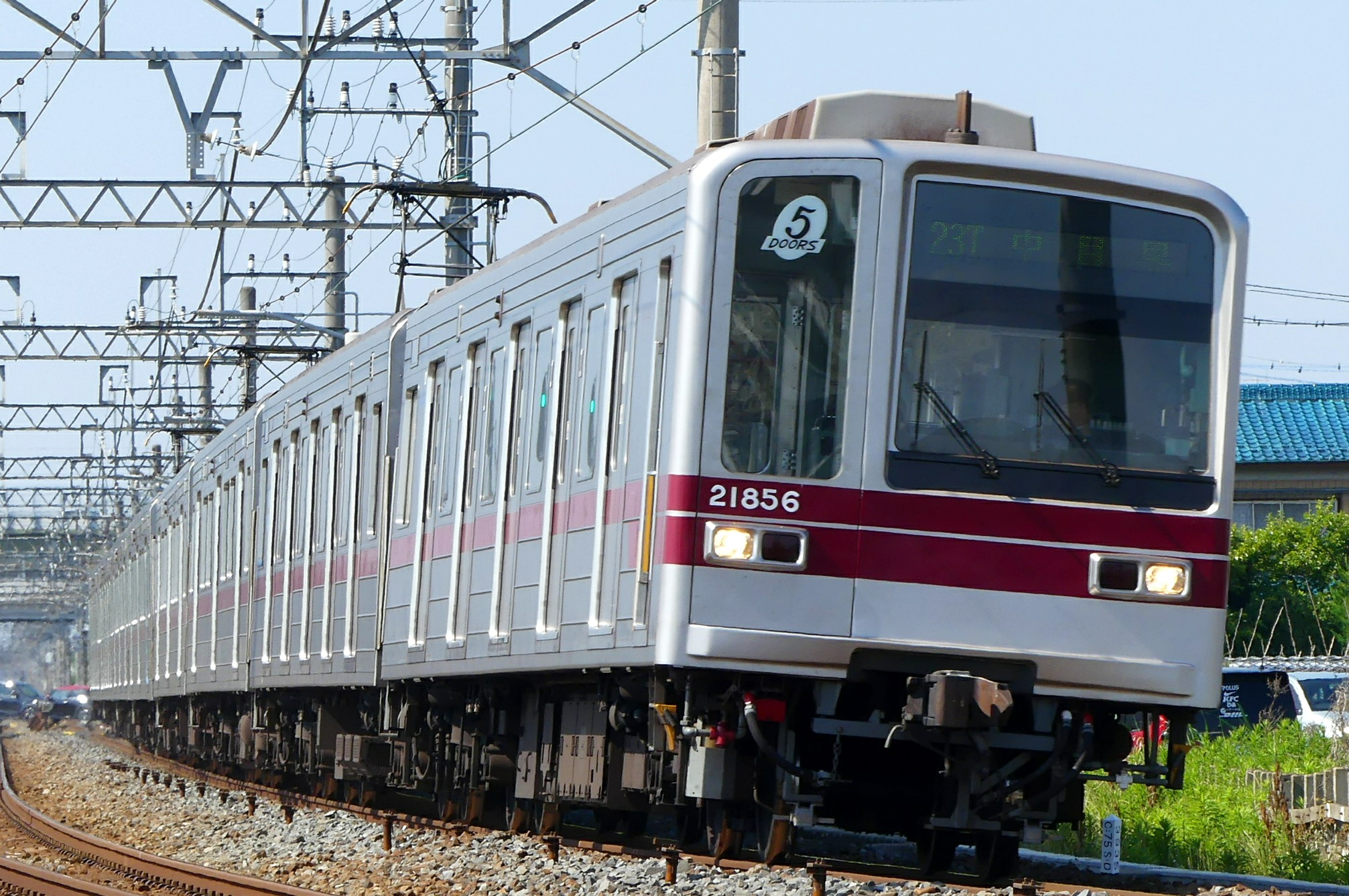
Tobu 20000 series

== Notes ==
a. Crowding levels defined by the Ministry of Land, Infrastructure, Transport and Tourism:

100% — Commuters have enough personal space and are able to take a seat or stand while holding onto the straps or hand rails.
150% — Commuters have enough personal space to read a newspaper.
180% — Commuters must fold newspapers to read.
200% — Commuters are pressed against each other in each compartment but can still read small magazines.
250% — Commuters are pressed against each other, unable to move.
