= Naka-Meguro Station =

Railway and metro station in Tokyo, Japan

Coordinates: 35.644306°N 139.699187°E

Naka-meguro Station 中目黒駅

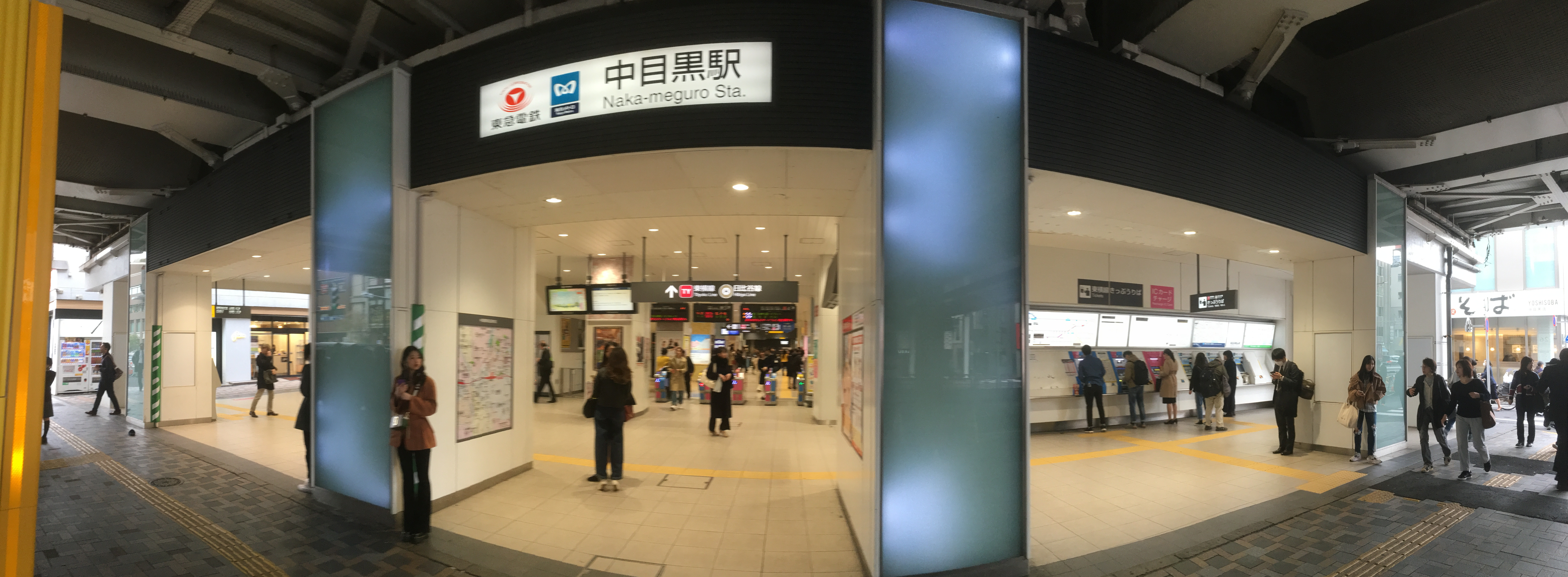
- Naka-meguro Station entrance

Japanese name
- Shinjitai: 中目黒駅
- Kyūjitai: 中目黑驛
- Hiragana: なかめぐろえき

General information
- Location: 3-4-1 Kami-meguro, Meguro-ku, Tokyo; Japan
- Operator: Tōkyū Railways (manager); Tokyo Metro
- Lines: Tōyoko Line; Hibiya Line
- Platforms: 2 island platforms
- Tracks: 4

Construction
- Structure type: Elevated

Other information
- Station code: TY03

History
- Opened: 28 August 1927; 98 years ago

Passengers
- FY2019: 196,777 daily (Tokyu); 230,353 daily (Tokyo Metro)

Services
Preceding station	Tōkyū Railways	Following station
Jiyūgaoka towards Motomachi-Chūkagai	F Liner	Shibuya towards Hannō or Ogawamachi
Jiyūgaoka towards Yokohama	Tōyoko Line Limited Express Commuter Express	Shibuya Terminus
Gakugei-daigaku towards Yokohama	Tōyoko Line Express	Shibuya Terminus
Yūtenji towards Yokohama	Tōyoko Line Local	Daikan-yama towards Shibuya
Preceding station	Tokyo Metro	Following station
Terminus	Hibiya Line	Ebisu towards Kita-Senju
Location
- Location within Tokyo Yamanote Loop Location within Tokyo wards area Location within Japan

Naka-meguro Station (中目黒駅, Naka-meguro-eki) is a railway station in Meguro, Tokyo, Japan, jointly operated by Tokyu Corporation and Tokyo Metro. Despite its name, the station is not located in Nakameguro, but in the neighboring Kamimeguro district.

== Lines ==
Naka-meguro Station is served by the following lines:

- Tōkyū Tōyoko Line
- Tokyo Metro Hibiya Line

Naka-meguro Station serves as the transfer point between the Tōkyū Tōyoko Line and the Tokyo Metro Hibiya Line, connecting Yokohama with the districts of Roppongi, Akihabara, Ginza, and Tsukiji in Tokyo, and beyond. The Tōyoko Line continues towards Yokohama, to the districts of Minato Mirai 21, Chinatown, and Motomachi via the Minato Mirai Line.

== Station layout ==
The station is composed of two island platforms serving a total of four platforms. Tokyu and Tokyo Metro share the same station grounds and platforms. Trains bound for the Hibiya Line use the inner two platforms and tracks, while Tokyu Toyoko Line trains use the outside two platforms and tracks.

=== Platforms ===
1
Tōyoko Line
- for Jiyūgaoka, Musashi-kosugi and Yokohama
- Minatomirai Line for Motomachi-Chūkagai
- Sotetsu Izumino Line for Shōnandai via the Tokyu/Sotetsu Shin-Yokohama Line
2
Hibiya Line
Terminating services only
3
Hibiya Line
for Ginza, Ueno and Kita-Senju
Tobu Skytree Line for Tōbu-Dōbutsu-Kōen
Tobu Nikko Line for Minami-Kurihashi
4
Tōyoko Line
for Shibuya
Fukutoshin Line for Shinjuku-Sanchōme, Ikebukuro, Kotake-Mukaihara and Wakoshi
Tobu Tojo Line for Shinrinkōen and Shiki
Seibu Ikebukuro Line for Hannō

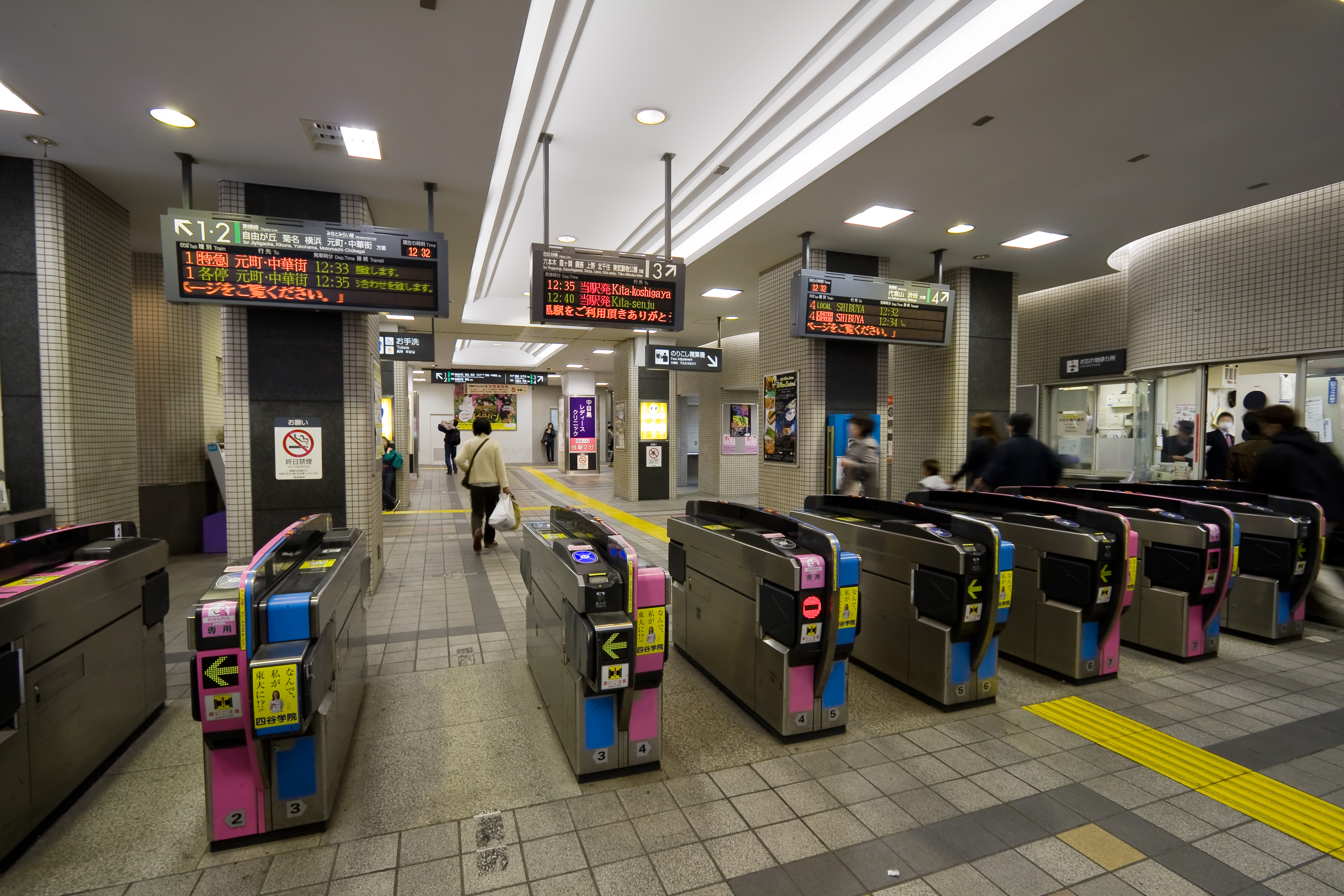
Ticket gates, March 2010

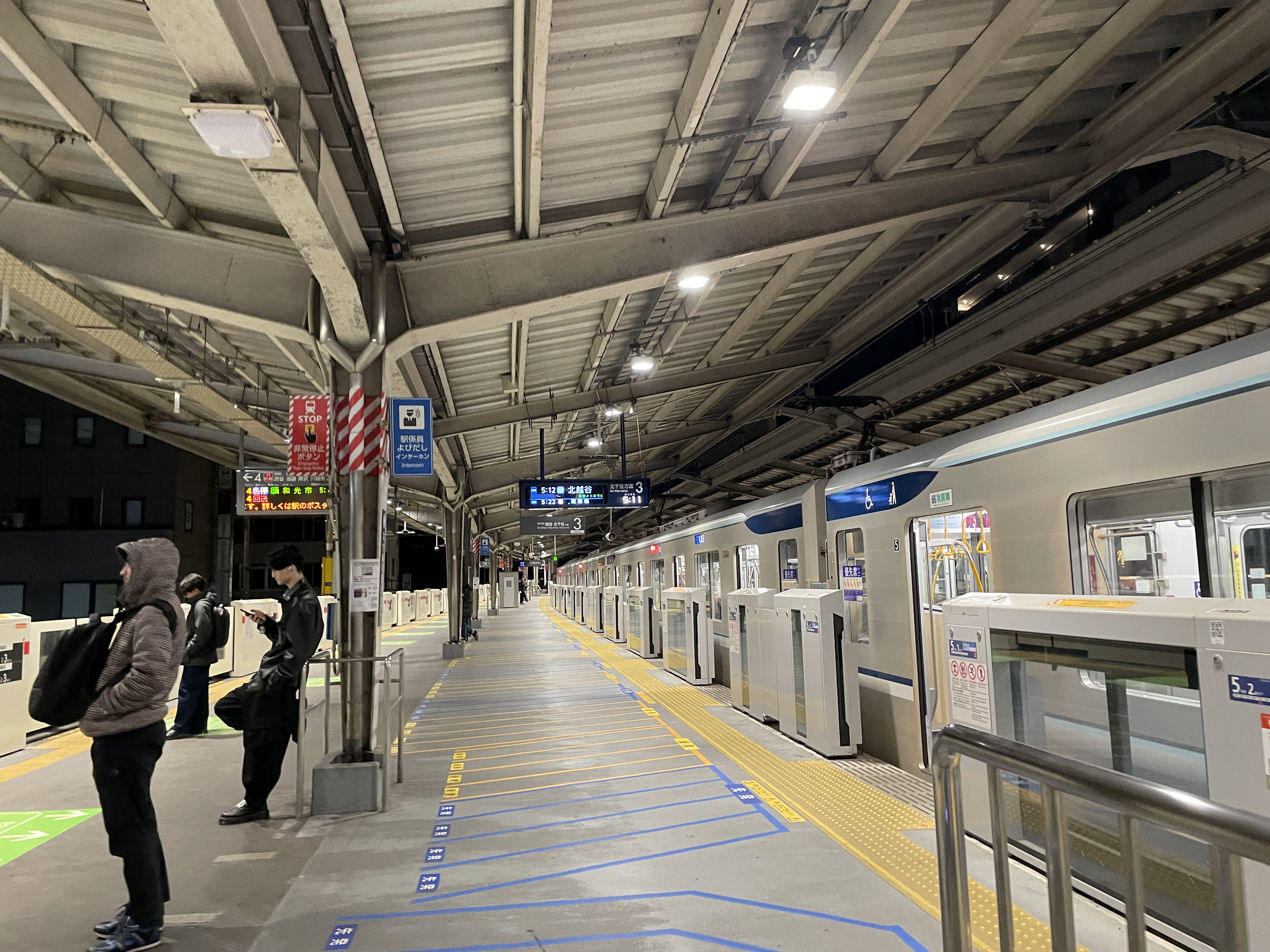
Platform, December 2024

== History ==
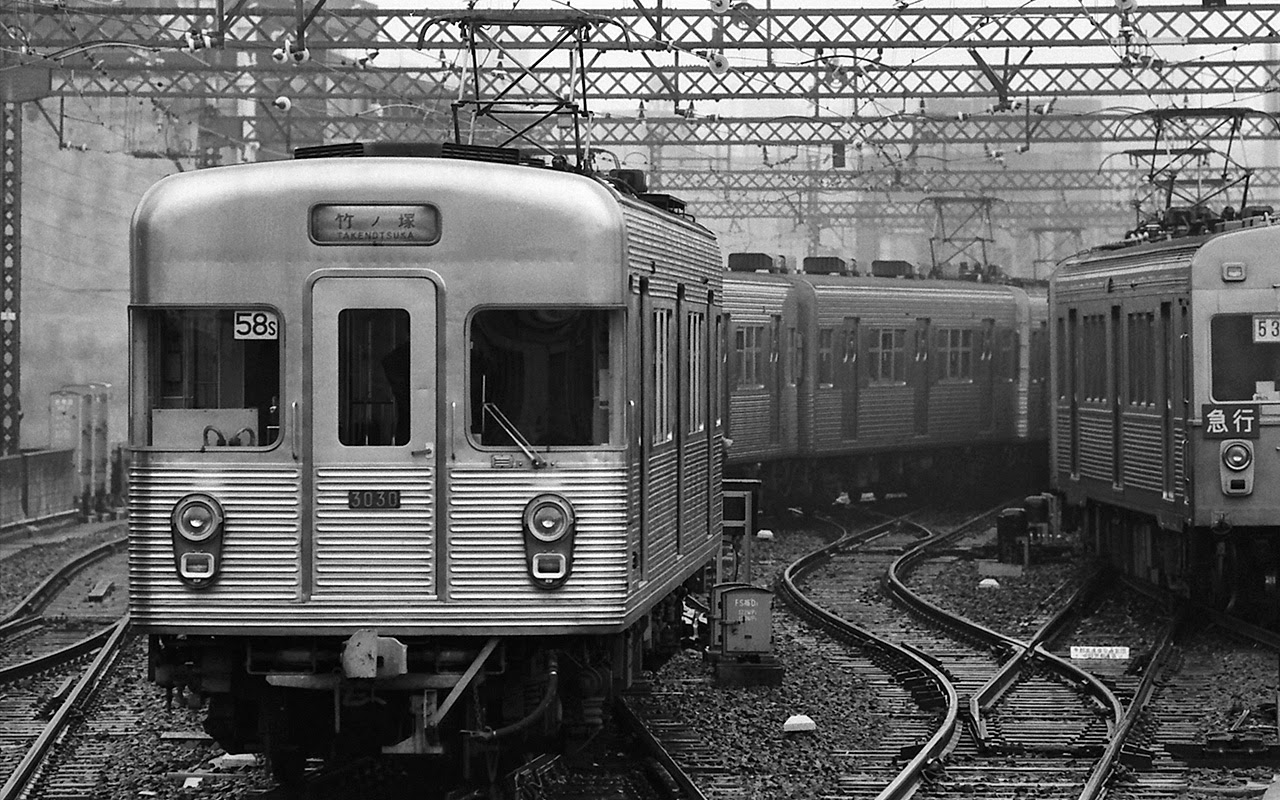
A TRTA 3000 series EMU at Naka-meguro after arriving on a Hibiya Line through working, 1977. The train on the right is a Tokyu 7200 series.

- The station opened on 28 August 1927. It has always been elevated.
- On 22 July 1964, the Hibiya Line was extended to Naka-meguro Station as the terminus of the line at the time from Kasumigaseki by the Teito Rapid Transit Authority (TRTA).
- Services between Hiyoshi and Kita-Koshigaya (on the Tobu Skytree Line) began on 29 August that year. At the same time, the station became an express stop.
- On the morning of 20 March 1995, terrorist Toru Toyoda boarded the Hibiya Line train at Naka-meguro Station with two packets of sarin nerve agent, which were subsequently released at the next stop at Ebisu Station, as part of the wider Tokyo subway sarin attack.
- The Naka-Meguro train disaster occurred on 8 March 2000.
- The station became a limited express and commuter limited express stop on 19 March 2003.
- Scenes of the 2003 film Lost in Translation were filmed around there.
- On 16 March 2013, the Tokyu Toyoko Line began through services with Tokyo Metro Fukutoshin Line. Consequently, Tokyu Toyoko Line's through service with Tokyo Metro Hibiya Line at this station was discontinued. All Hibiya Line trains now terminate at this station.
