= Azabu =

Human settlement in Japan

Coordinates: 35°39′16.7256″N 139°44′13.5″E

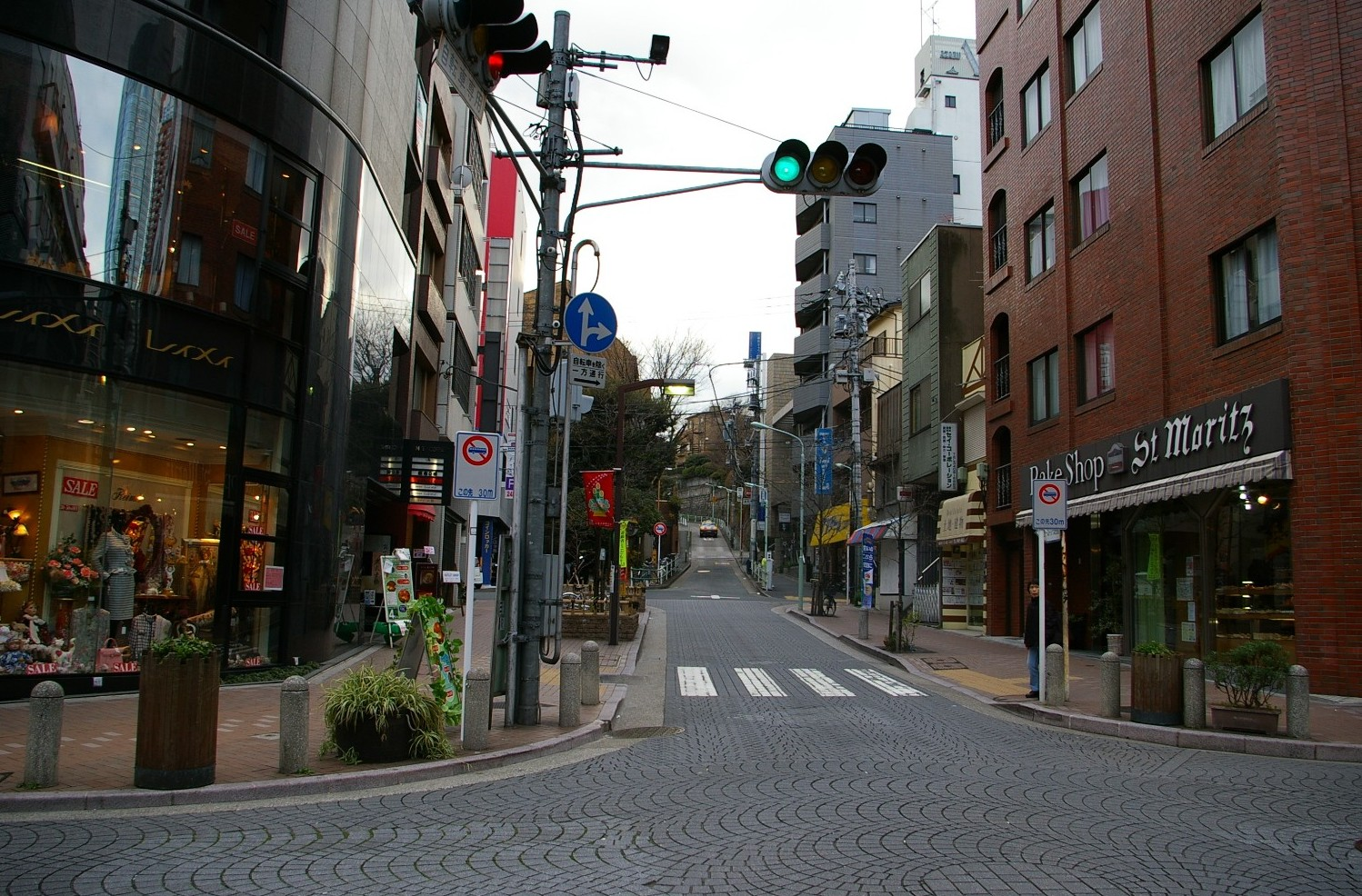
Azabu-juban

Azabu (麻布) is an area in Minato, Tokyo, Japan. Built on a marshy area of foothills south of central Tokyo, its coverage roughly corresponds to that of the former Azabu Ward, presently consisting of nine official districts: Azabu-Jūban, Azabudai, Azabu-Nagasakachō, Azabu-Mamianachō, Minami-Azabu, Nishi-Azabu, Higashi-Azabu, Moto-Azabu and Roppongi. It is known as one of Tokyo's most expensive and upscale residential districts with many artists, business people, and celebrities residing there. It is also known for its large foreign population, due in part to a number of foreign embassies present in the area.

== Etymology ==
The name Azabu (麻布) literally means “hemp cloth.” It first appears in records from 1559 as “阿佐布,” with several variant writings used through the Edo period. The present form (麻布) came into regular use by the mid-17th century, and is thought to derive from local farmers in Moto-Azabu who produced hemp cloth.

== History ==
Until the early Edo period, the area was agricultural. Archaeological evidence indicates that the area was inhabited as far back as the Jōmon period. The Juban Inari shrine (formerly known as Takechiyo Inari) was constructed in AD 712, the temple of Zenpuku-ji in 824, and the Hikawa Shrine in 939 (on orders of Minamoto no Tsunemoto).

The area became urbanized in the 17th century, after Tokugawa Ieyasu established his seat of government in nearby Edo. Azabu soon became home to the Juban Horse Grounds, Edo's largest horse market. In 1859, the first United States delegation in Japan was established at Zenpuku-ji.

Azabu (including the adjacent district of Roppongi) was a ward of Tokyo from 1878 to 1947. During the industrialization of the Meiji era, Azabu was connected to Tokyo by horse-drawn trams. The lowlands became light commercial areas, while the hilltops became prime residential areas. Later, during the Taishō period, Azabu was overrun with theaters, department stores, and red-light districts, becoming one of Japan's best-known entertainment districts.

Much of Azabu was destroyed during the firebombing of Tokyo in 1945, although a special bunker created for the privileged classes that lived there saved many lives, including Yoko Ono's. Azabu's commercial areas were not revived after the war, and the area is mainly a residential district today. Following the merger of Azabu Ward into Minato Ward in 1947, the Azabu ward office located in Roppongi was converted into a branch office of the Minato ward government.

== Notable residents ==
This is the district of Tokyo where manga artist Naoko Takeuchi resides, and the Azabu-Jūban area is the setting of her fictional Sailor Moon series. The internationally acclaimed vocalist Ayumi Hamasaki resides in a penthouse apartment in Minami-Azabu. Azabu is also the location of many international embassies and consulates, as well as a large foreign population. Azabu-Jūban, with its unique cobbled high-street, also hosts the popular annual Azabu-Jūban Matsuri, a food festival with a variety of local vendor stalls and carnival games which attract large crowds every summer.

== Places in Azabu ==
Azabu contains a concentration of foreign embassies including those of Afghanistan, Russia, China, Germany, Austria, Switzerland, Slovakia, Taiwan, Norway, Philippines, Finland, South Korea, Iran, France, Romania, Greece and Portugal.

Among the area's historic religious sites is Zenpuku-ji, a temple which housed the first legation of the United States in Japan during the 19th century. Nearby Hikawa Shrine serves as a focal point for local festivals.

Azabu also hosts major community institutions. The Mindan (Korean Residents Union in Japan) has its headquarters here, reflecting the area’s role as a hub for Tokyo’s Korean population. The district also contains the long-standing Azabu-Jūban shopping street, Azabu High School, and several international schools, contributing to its reputation as a cosmopolitan neighborhood.

== Companies based in Azabu ==
- Fujifilm, located in Nishi-Azabu

== Subway stations ==
- Akabanebashi Station (Toei Oedo Line)
- Azabu-Jūban Station (Namboku Line, Toei Oedo Line)
- Hiroo Station (Hibiya Line)

== Education ==
=== Schools ===
The City of Minato (The Minato Ward) Board of Education operates local public elementary and junior high schools. Tokyo Metropolitan Government Board of Education operates local public high schools.

- Roppongi High School, a public school, located in Roppongi (former district in Azabu Ward).
- Toyo Eiwa Jogakuin, a private girls school, located in Roppongi (former district in Azabu Ward).
- Azabu Junior and Senior High School, a private boys school, located in Moto-Azabu.
- Hiroo Gakuen Junior and Senior High School, a private school, located in Minami-Azabu.
- Kōryō Junior High School, a public school, located in Nishi-Azabu.
- Azabu Elementary School, a public school, located in Azabu-Dai.
- Nanzan Elementary School, a public school, located in Moto-Azabu.
- Kōgai Elementary School, a public school located in Nishi-Azabu, which has "Nihongo Gakkyu (Japanese language class)" for foreign students and returnee.
- Higashimachi Elementary School, a public school, located in Azabu-Jūban.
- Honmura Elementary School, a public school, located in Minami-Azabu.
- Nishimachi International School, a private school located in Moto-Azabu.
- Tokyo International School, a private school located in Minami-Azabu.
- Chateau School, a private pre school, located in Nishi-Azabu.
- Ohana International School in Tokyo, a small preschool, located in the centre of Azabu-Jūban.
- The Montessori School of Tokyo, a private school, located in Minami-Azabu.

=== Public libraries ===
- Tokyo Metropolitan Central Library, located in Arisugawa-no-miya-Kinen Kōen (Arisugawa-no-miya Memorial Park), Minami-Azabu.
- The Azabu Library exists in Azabu-Juban.

== Notable people from Azabu ==
- Keiichirō Akagi, actor and singer
