= Kiku Amino =

Japanese novelist (1900–1978)

- 網野 菊
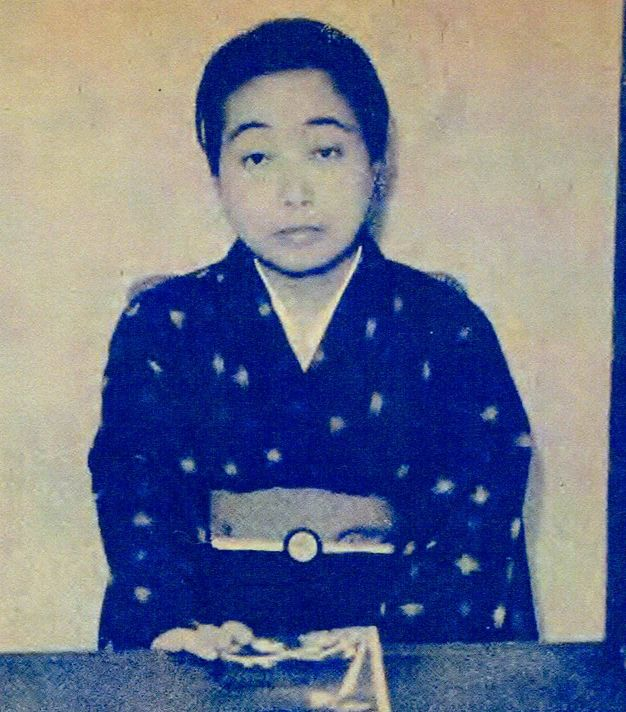
- Amino in 1949
- Born: January 16, 1900; Akasaka, Tokyo
- Died: May 15, 1978 (aged 78); Aoyama Cemetery, Tokyo
- Occupations: Author, translator
- Spouse: Aihara Shinsaku (m. 1923–1936)
- Writing career
- Language: Japanese
- Notable works: Ichigo ichie (Once in a Lifetime), Kisha no nakade (On the Train), Kin no kan (A Golden Coffin)

Kiku Amino (網野 菊, Amino Kiku; January 16, 1900 – May 15, 1978) was a Japanese writer and translator of English and Russian literature. She was a recipient of the Women's Literature Prize, the Yomiuri Prize, and Japan Academy of the Arts prize.

== Biography ==
Amino was born on January 16, 1900, in Azabu-Mamianachō, and raised in Akasaka, Tokyo. Her father was a well-to-do saddlemaker, and mother left when Amino was six, after which she had three stepmothers. She graduated from the Japan Women's University in 1920, with a degree in English, then worked as a part-time assistant editor at a magazine, and from 1921 to 1926, as a substitute English teacher at the university. In 1921, she published a self-financed collection of stories entitled Aki (Autumn), and in 1923 met author Shiga Naoya whose disciple she became. She married in 1930, living in Hooten, Manchuria, from 1930 to 1938, but divorced in 1936. She did not publish while married, but made a comeback with a collection of short stories called Kisha no nakade (On the Train) in 1940.

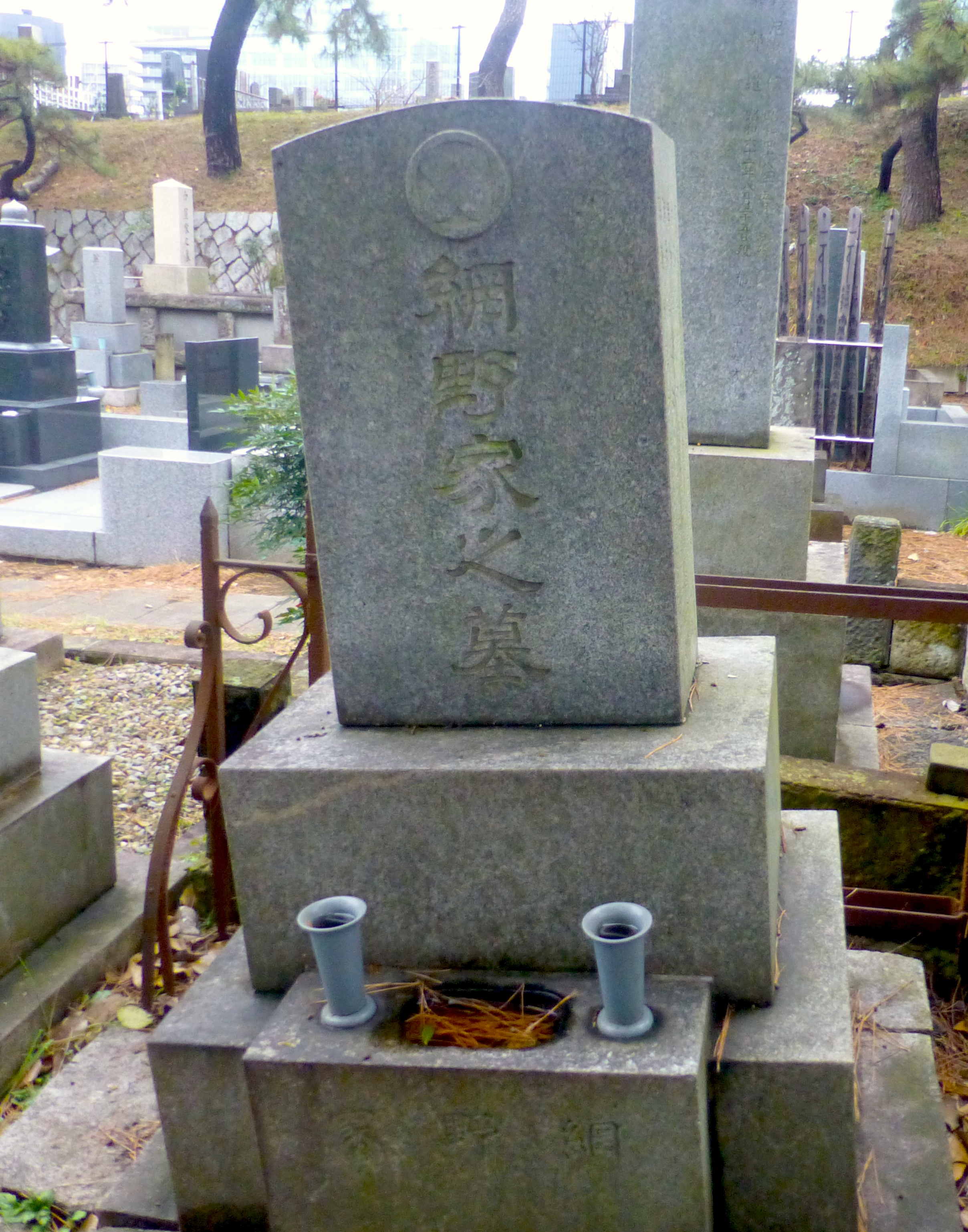
Animo's tombstone

Amino was a member of the Japan Art Academy and received the 1947 Women's Literature Prize for Kin no kan (A Golden Coffin), and the 1967 Yomiuri Prize and Japan Academy of the Arts prize for her short story Ichigo ichie (Once in a Lifetime). She is buried in Aoyama Reien, 2-32-2 Minami Aoyama, where Shiga Naoya is also buried.

== Sources ==
- Donald Keene, Dawn to the West: Japanese literature of the modern era, fiction, Volume 1, 2nd edition, Columbia University Press, 1998, pages 528–531. ISBN 978-0-231-11434-9.
- Japanese Wikipedia article
- Prominent People of Minato City (with photo)
