= Azabu-Mamianachō =

District of Minato, Tokyo, Japan

Coordinates: 35.6582°N 139.7390°E

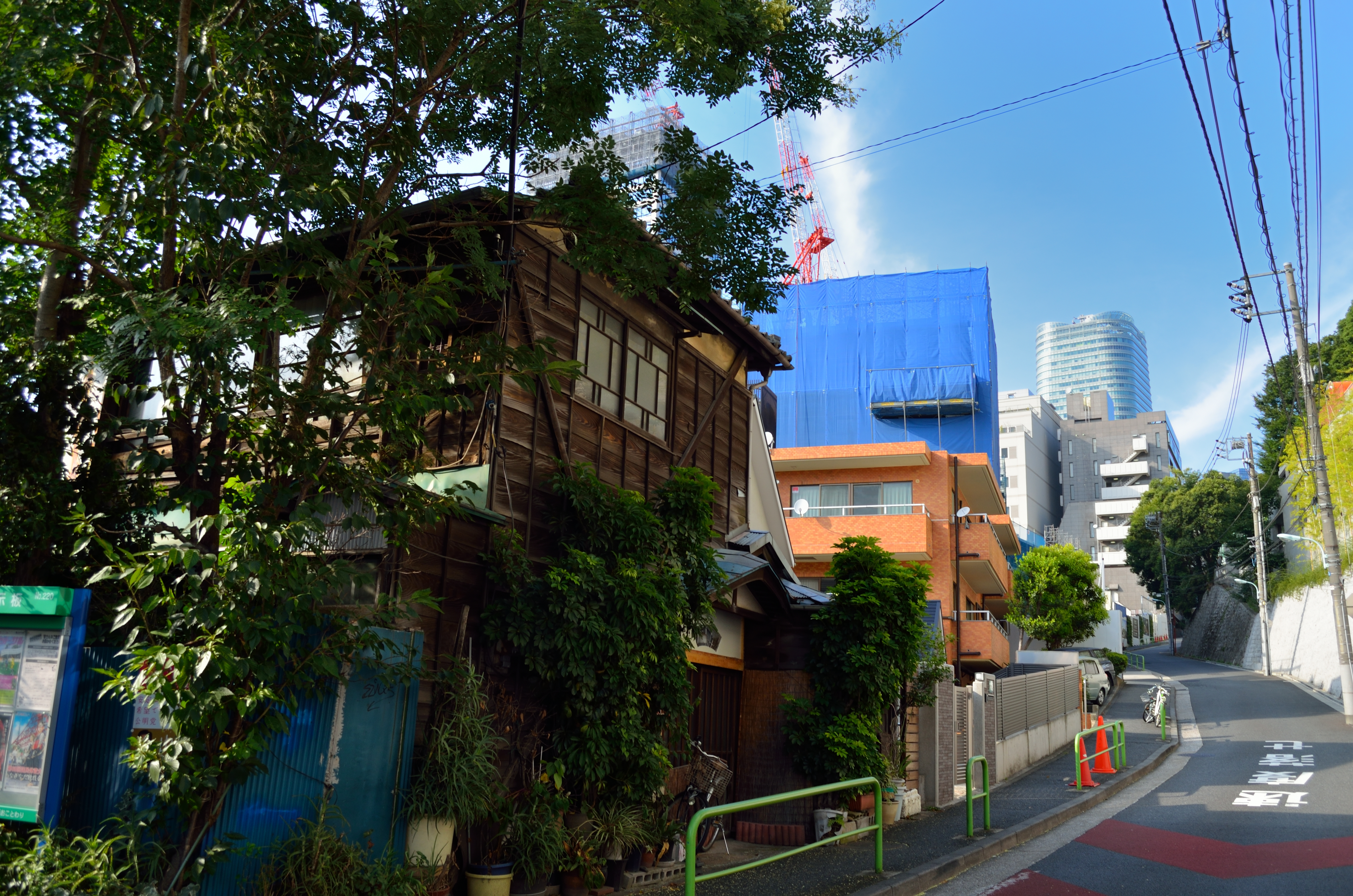
Mamiana-zaka Slope

Azabu-Mamianachō (麻布狸穴町) is a district of Minato, Tokyo, Japan. As of February 1, 2020, the total population is 697.

Azabu-Mamianachō borders Azabudai on the north and east, Azabu-Nagasakachō on the west, and Higashiazabu on the south.

The district has one small ward park, Mamiana Park (狸穴公園, Mamiana Kōen), whose total area is 1,771.90 meters squared.

It used to be called Iigura village (飯倉村, Iigura-mura).

== Education ==
Minato City Board of Education operates public elementary and junior high schools.

Azabu-Mamianachō is zoned to Azabu Elementary School (麻布小学校) and Roppongi Junior High School (六本木中学校).
