= Azabu-juban Station =

Metro station in Tokyo, Japan

Coordinates: 35.654742°N 139.737012°E

Azabu-juban Station 麻布十番駅

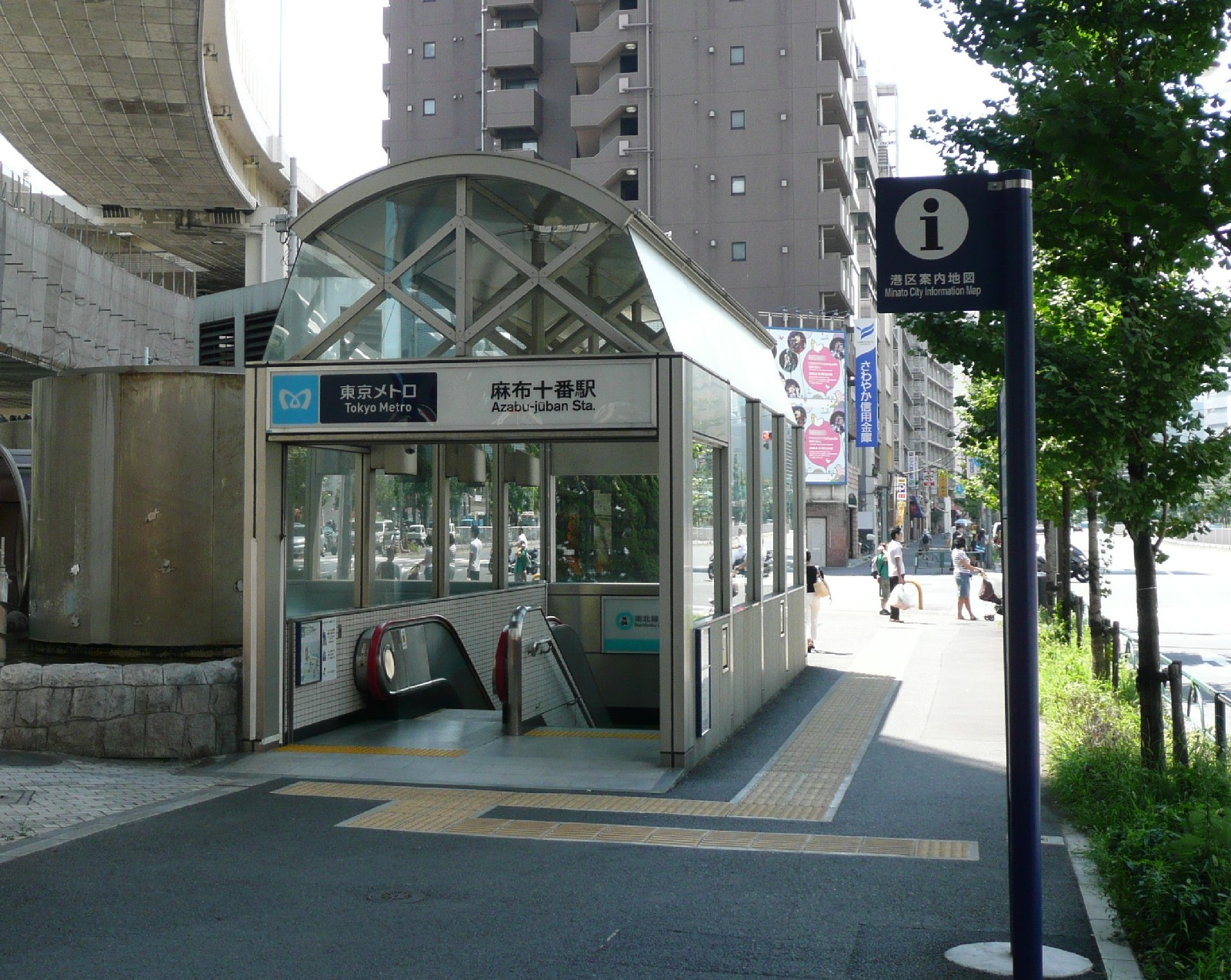
- Entrance No. 3 in 2008

General information
- Location: Azabu-Jūban, Minato, Tokyo; Japan
- Operator: Tokyo Metro; Toei Subway
- Lines: Namboku Line; Ōedo Line
- Platforms: 2 island platforms (1 for each line)
- Tracks: 4

Construction
- Structure type: Underground

Other information
- Station code: N-04 / E-22

History
- Opened: 26 September 2000; 25 years ago

Services
Preceding station	Tokyo Metro	Following station
Shirokane-takanawa towards Meguro	Namboku Line	Roppongi-itchōme towards Akabane-iwabuchi
Preceding station	Toei Subway	Following station
Roppongi towards Hikarigaoka	Ōedo Line	Akabanebashi towards Tochōmae
Location
- Location within Tokyo Yamanote Loop Location within Tokyo wards area Location within Japan

Azabu-juban Station (麻布十番駅, Azabu-jūban eki) is the name of two subway stations in Minato, Tokyo, Japan, one operated by Tokyo Metro and the other by Toei Subway.

== Lines ==
This station is served by the Tokyo Metro Namboku Line and Toei Ōedo Line. The station is numbered N-04 for the Namboku Line and E-22 for the Ōedo Line.

== Station layout ==
=== Tokyo Metro ===
The Namboku Line station consists of an island platform serving two tracks. The ticket gates are on the first basement floor, and the platforms are on the third basement floor.

1
Namboku Line
for Nagatachō, Komagome and Akabane-Iwabuchi
Saitama Rapid Railway Line for Urawa-Misono
2
- for Shirokane-takanawa and Meguro
- Meguro Line for Hiyoshi
- Tokyu Shin-Yokohama Line for Shin-Yokohama Station
- Sotetsu Main Line for Ebina via the Tokyu/Sotetsu Shin-Yokohama Line

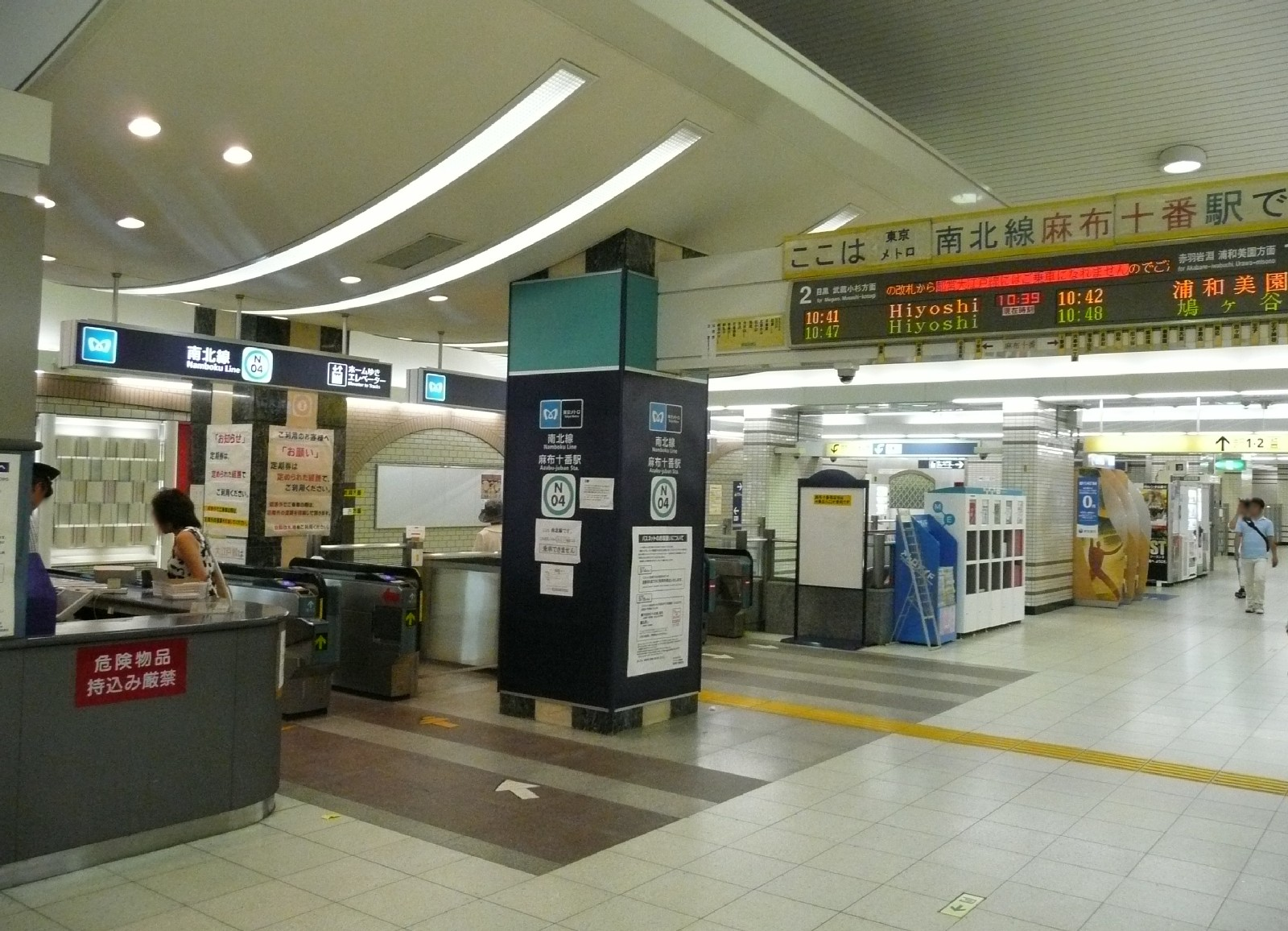
Ticket gates, 2008

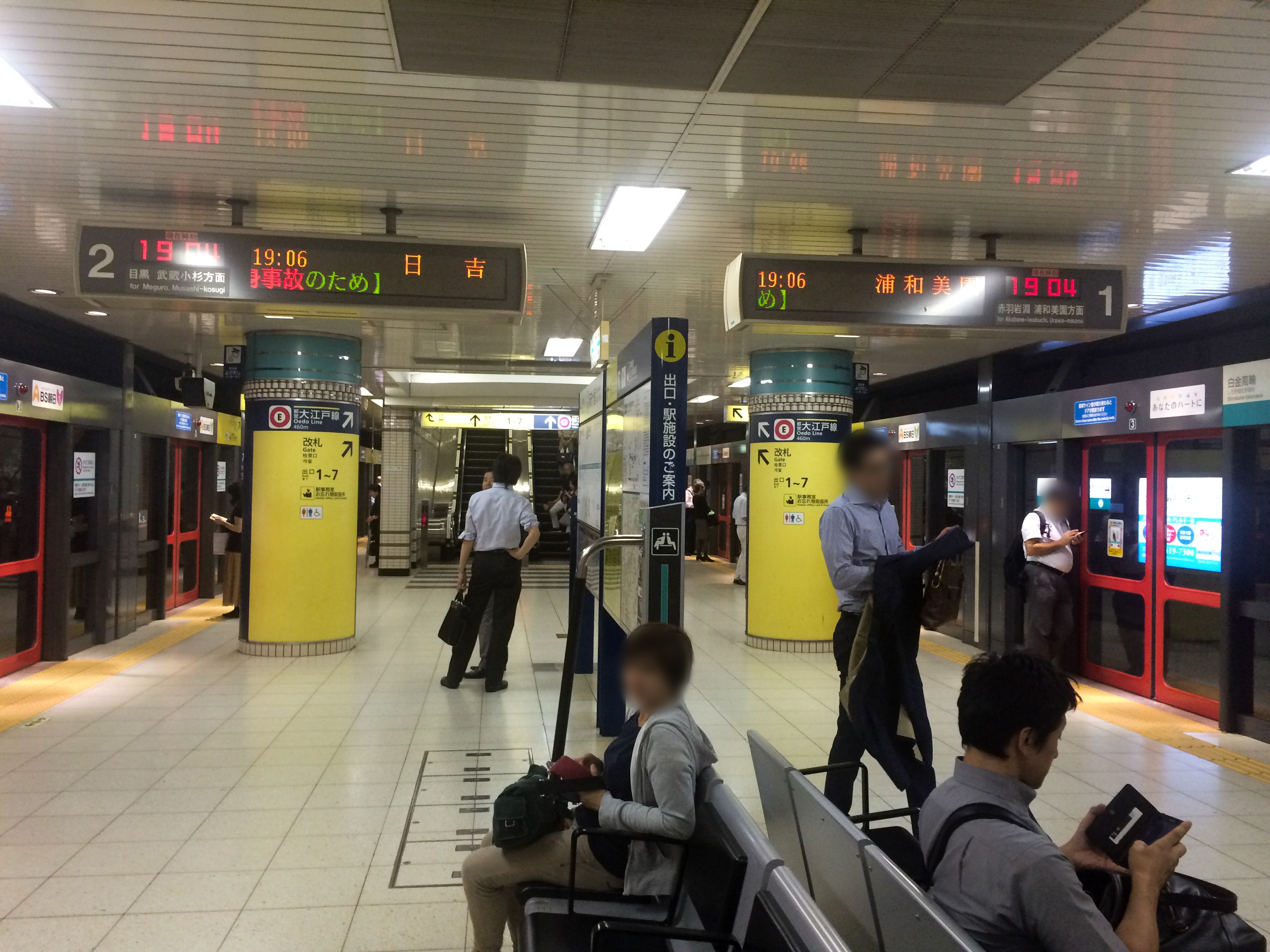
Namboku Line platforms, September 2016

=== Toei ===
The Toei Ōedo Line station also consists of an island platform serving two tracks. The ticket gates are on the fourth basement floor, and the platforms are on the sixth basement floor.

1	Ōedo Line	for Daimon and Ryōgoku
2	Ōedo Line	for Roppongi, Tochōmae and Hikarigaoka

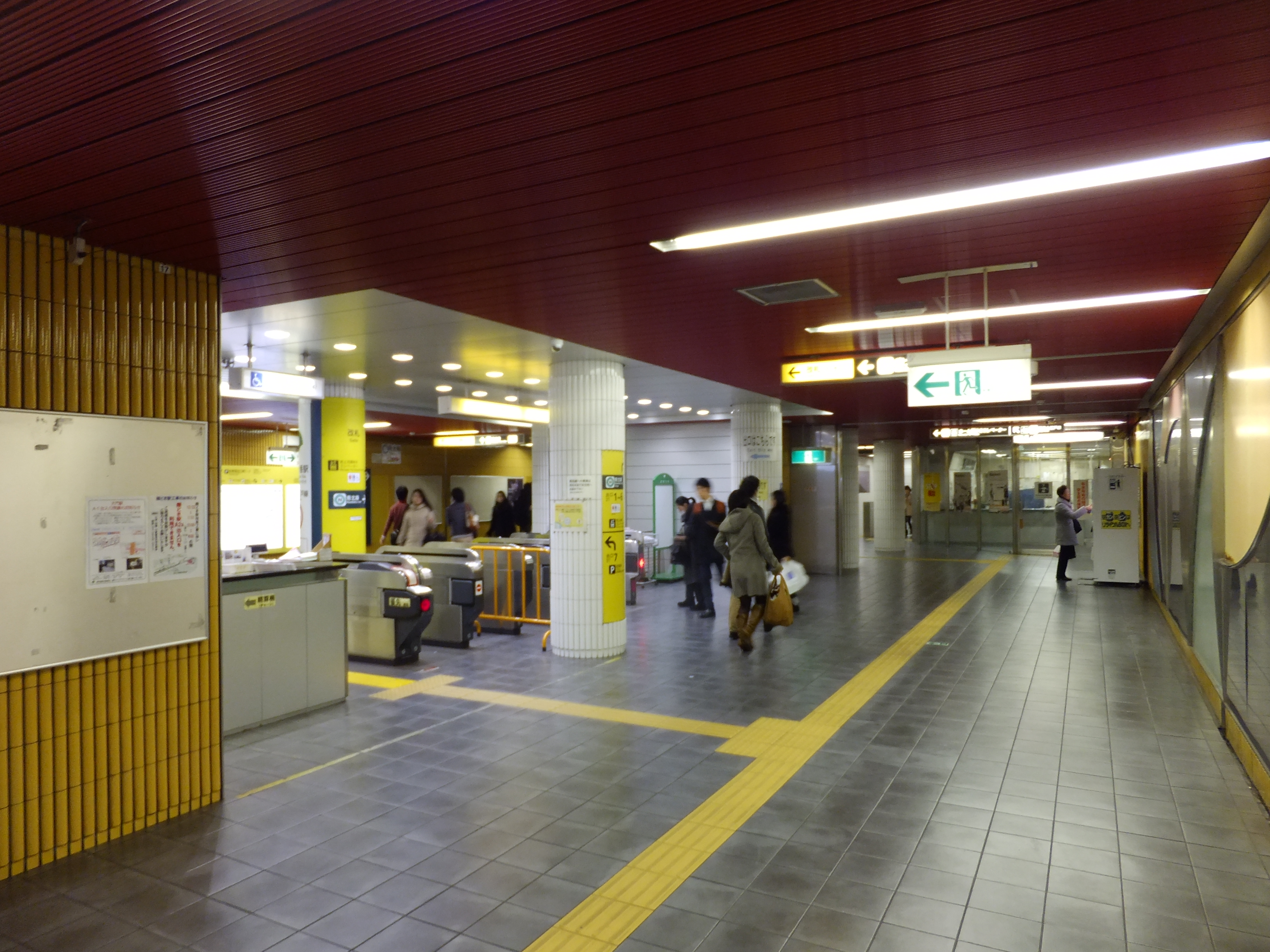
Ticket gates, 2014

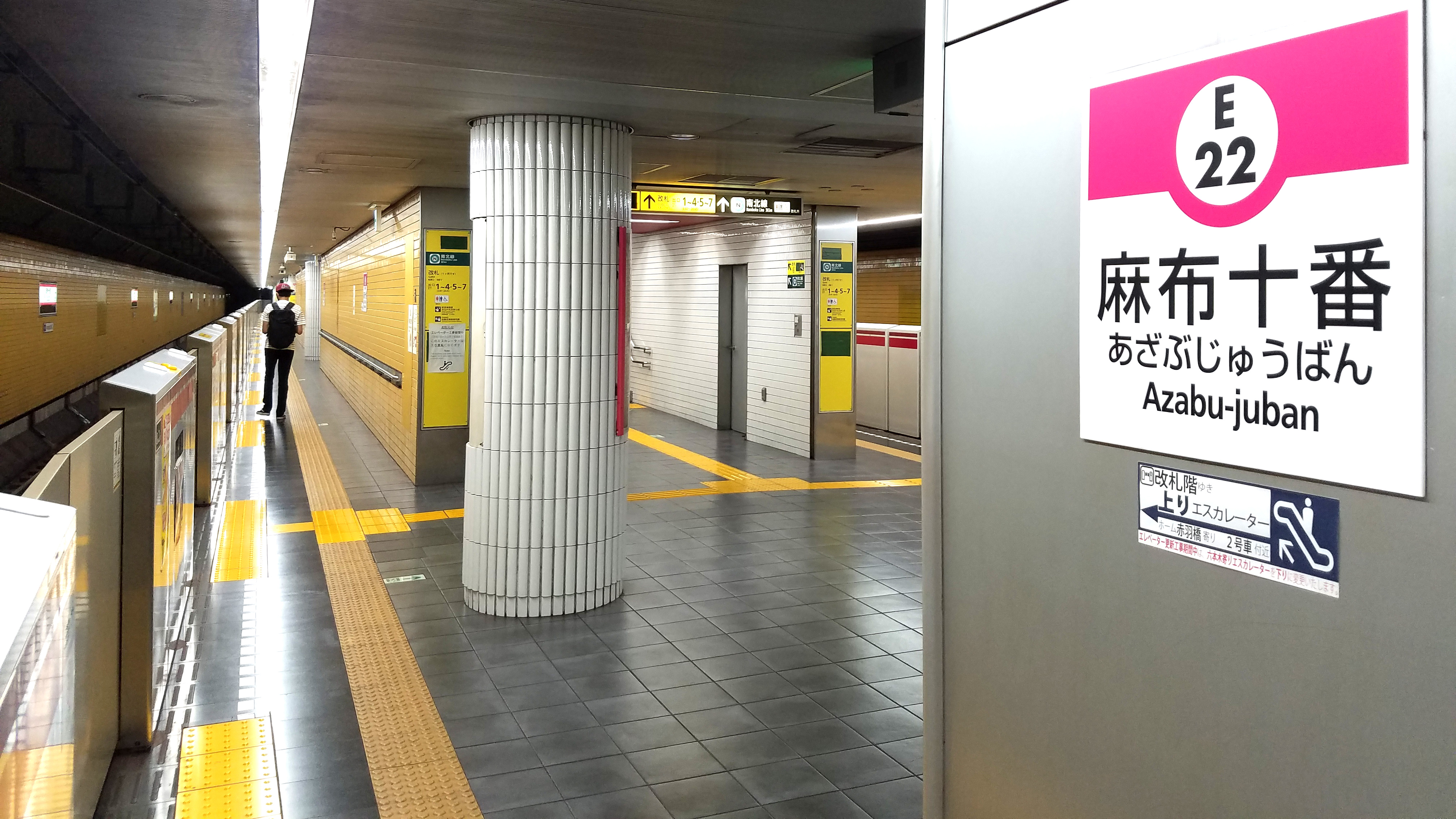
Platform, 2019

== History ==
The Namboku Line station opened on 26 September 2000, and the Ōedo Line platforms opened on 12 December of the same year. Prior to its opening, the station's provisional name was Azabu Station.

The station facilities of the Namboku Line were inherited by Tokyo Metro after the privatization of the Teito Rapid Transit Authority (TRTA) in 2004.

== Surrounding area ==
- Zenpuku-ji
- Roppongi Hills, TV Asahi
- Roppongi High School
- Snoopy Museum Tokyo, formerly
- Nanzan elementary school
- Higashimachi elementary school
- Ichinohashi Park
- Mindan, VANK
- Temple University Japan

== See also ==
- Azabu
- List of railway stations in Japan
