= Akabanebashi Station =

Metro station in Tokyo, Japan

Akabanebashi Station 赤羽橋駅

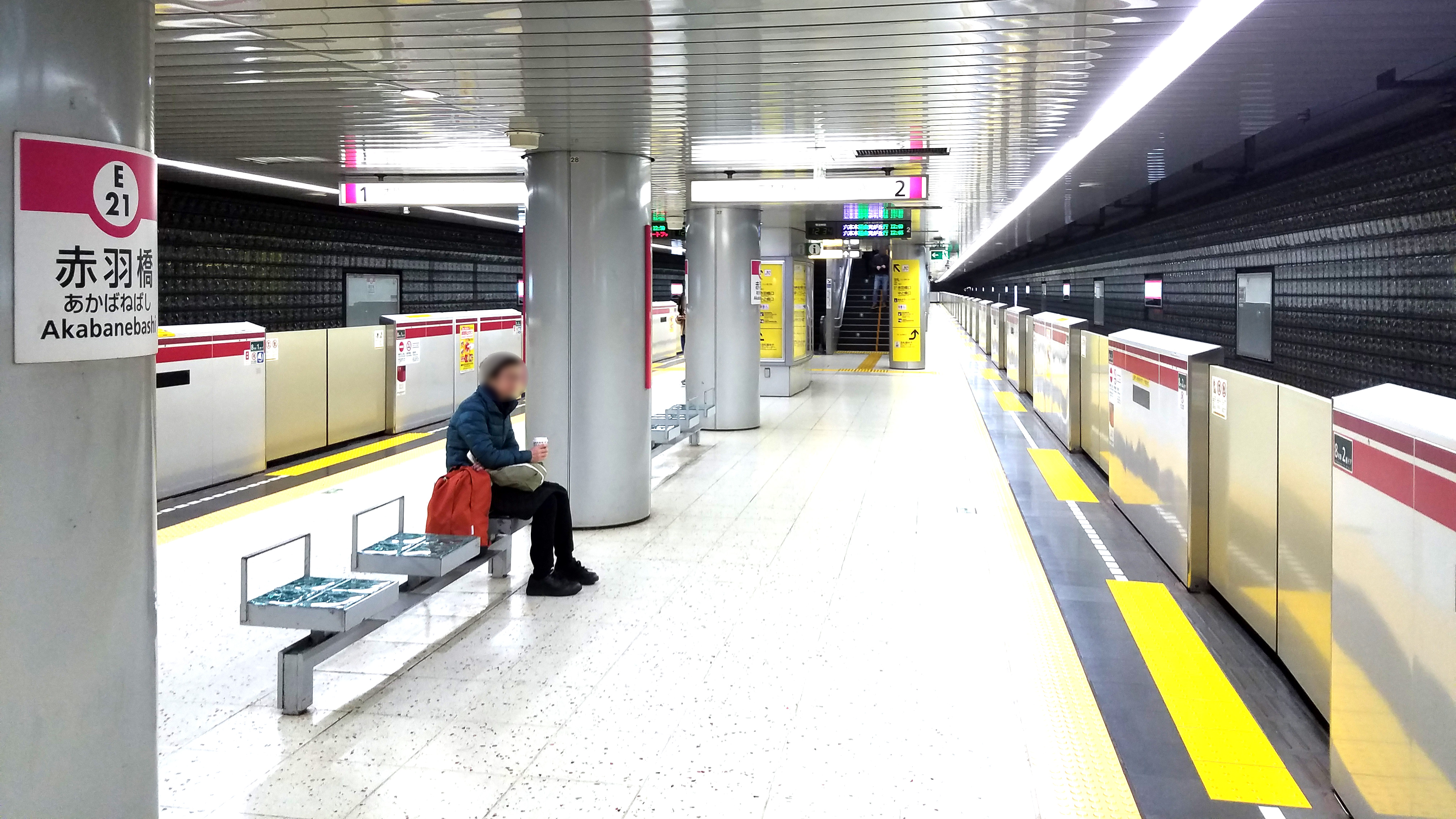
- Platforms, December 2019

General information
- Location: 1-28-13 Higashi-Azabu, Minato City, Tokyo （港区東麻布1-28-13） Japan
- Coordinates: 35°39′18.01″N 139°44′37.02″E
- Operator: Toei Subway
- Line: Ōedo Line
- Platforms: 1 island platform
- Tracks: 2

Construction
- Structure type: Underground

Other information
- Station code: E-21

History
- Opened: 12 December 2000; 25 years ago

Services
Preceding station	Toei Subway	Following station
Azabu-juban towards Hikarigaoka	Ōedo Line	Daimon towards Tochōmae
Location
- Location within Tokyo Yamanote Loop Location within Tokyo wards area Location within Japan

Akabanebashi Station (赤羽橋駅, Akabanebashi-eki) is a subway station on the Toei Ōedo Line in Minato, Tokyo, Japan, operated by the Tokyo subway operator Tokyo Metropolitan Bureau of Transportation (Toei).

== Lines ==
The station is served by the Toei Ōedo Line, and is numbered "E-21". It is also relatively close to Shibakoen Station on the Toei Mita Line (located 500 meters to the east), although it is not officially recognized as a transfer station and there is no transfer corridor between the two stations.

== Station layout ==
The station concourse with ticket vending machines and ticket barriers are located on the first basement ("B1F") level, and the platform is located on the second basement ("B2F") level. The platform is an island platform serving two tracks. There are two entrances/exits to the station on either end.

=== Platforms ===
1	Ōedo Line	for Daimon and Ryōgoku
2	Ōedo Line	for Roppongi, Tochōmae, and Hikarigaoka

== History ==
Akabanebashi Station opened on 12 December 2000.

== Surrounding area ==
- Tokyo Tower
- Shiba Park
- Keio University
- Saiseikai Central Hospital

== See also ==
- List of railway stations in Japan
