= Yoshimizu Daichi =

Most Ven. Yoshimizu Daichi

Personal details
- Born: 4 July 1941 Minato, Tokyo, Japan
- Died: 10 September 2023 (aged 82) Minato, Tokyo, Japan

Yoshimizu Daichi (4 July 1941 – 10 September 2023) was a Japanese Buddhist priest from Minato, Tokyo, who has contributed to the development of Buddhism in Vietnam for over 50 years. He is considered a great Buddhist educator in Japan and Vietnam. He was Spiritual Advisor of Vietnamese Buddhist Association in Japan, former President of Jodo Shu Buddhism, Japan, and Deputy Chief Priest of Nisshinkutsu temple.

== Honours and awards ==
- National Vietnam Buddhist Sangha's Sangharaja's Award
- Prime Minister Nguyen Tan Dung's Award
- Honorary PhD Degree from Vietnam Buddhist University
