= Russian Embassy School in Tokyo =

International school in Tokyo, Japan

Russian Embassy School in Tokyo (Russian: Средняя общеобразовательная школа с углубленным изучением иностранного языка при Посольстве России в Японии, Japanese: 在日ロシア大使館付属学校) is a Russian overseas school in Azabudai, Minato, Tokyo. It is operated by the Russian Ministry of Foreign Affairs.

== See also ==
- Russians in Japan
- Japanese School in Moscow
- Japan–Russia relations
- List of Ministry of Foreign Affairs of Russia overseas schools
