= Tokyo International School =

International school in Tokyo, Japan

Coordinates: 35°38′50.6″N 139°44′5.9″E

Information
- School type: International school
- Established: 1997; 29 years ago
- Gender: Mixed
- Enrollment: c.500
- Website: tokyois.com

Tokyo International School is a co-ed IB World international school in Minato, Tokyo, Japan. Offering the IB PYP, MYP & DP for students aged 5–18 years old.

It was founded in 1997 to "provide a diverse, child-centered and inquiry-based education." The school contains a lower & upper school for students from Kindergarten to High School (K-G12), with a total student population of approximately 470 students representing over 70 nationalities. Instruction is in English and the school follows the International Baccalaureate Organization curriculum guidelines. It is accredited by New England Association of Schools and Colleges and the Council of International Schools. Admission guidelines are designed to ensure each class has no more than 20 students. Located in the TAKANAWA GATEWAY CITY area of central Tokyo, it is one of the few internationally accredited IB World international schools in the center of the city. The TIS Mission: "We are a truly international community with a student-centered focus, dedicated to holistic wellbeing and meaningful learning." The Good Schools Guide International called it "lively and imaginative."

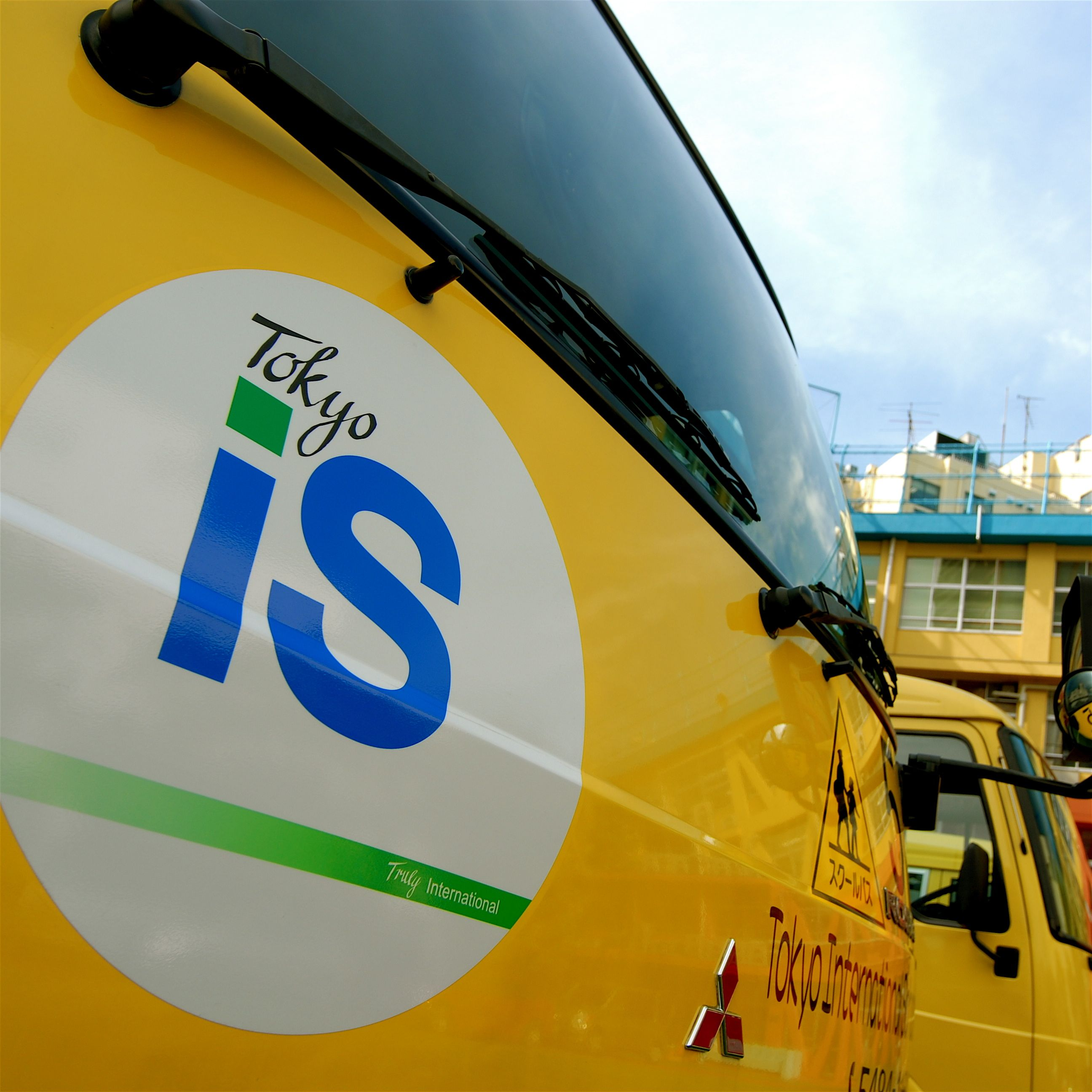
A bus at Tokyo International School

== History ==
In 1997, American-Japanese husband and wife Patrick Newell and Ikuko Tsuboya-Newell started Tokyo International School to provide an education for their two daughters. Starting with 12 students and one classroom, the school moved twice in the Meguro area of Tokyo before moving to Shirokane in 2000. In March 2004, due to a growing number of students, the school moved to a new location in Tamachi, the site of the recently vacated Nankai Elementary School. The schoolyard was resurfaced and the building was reinforced and painted a distinctive blue, orange, and yellow before the school moved in. After ten years at the Tamachi location, in August 2013 the school moved to its current location in Minami-Azabu. The school began offering Grade 10 courses in August 2023 to complete its IB MYP programme.

In August 2025 the school began offering the IB Diploma (IBDP) Grade 11, these students will continue into Grade 12 IBDP in the following academic year 2026/27.

In August 2026, Tokyo International School will move to its new campus location in Takanawa Gateway City.

== Students ==
Students at Tokyo International School come from over 70 countries. No nationality makes up more than 20% of the student body. The largest represented nationalities as of 2025 are the United States and Japan, followed by Australia, South Korea and China.

== Teachers ==
Teachers at Tokyo International School come from all over the world with over 18 nationalities being represented. The largest represented nationalities as of 2025 being the United States, Japan, Canada, UK and Australia.
