= Minato, Tokyo =

Minato 港区
- Special ward
- Minato City
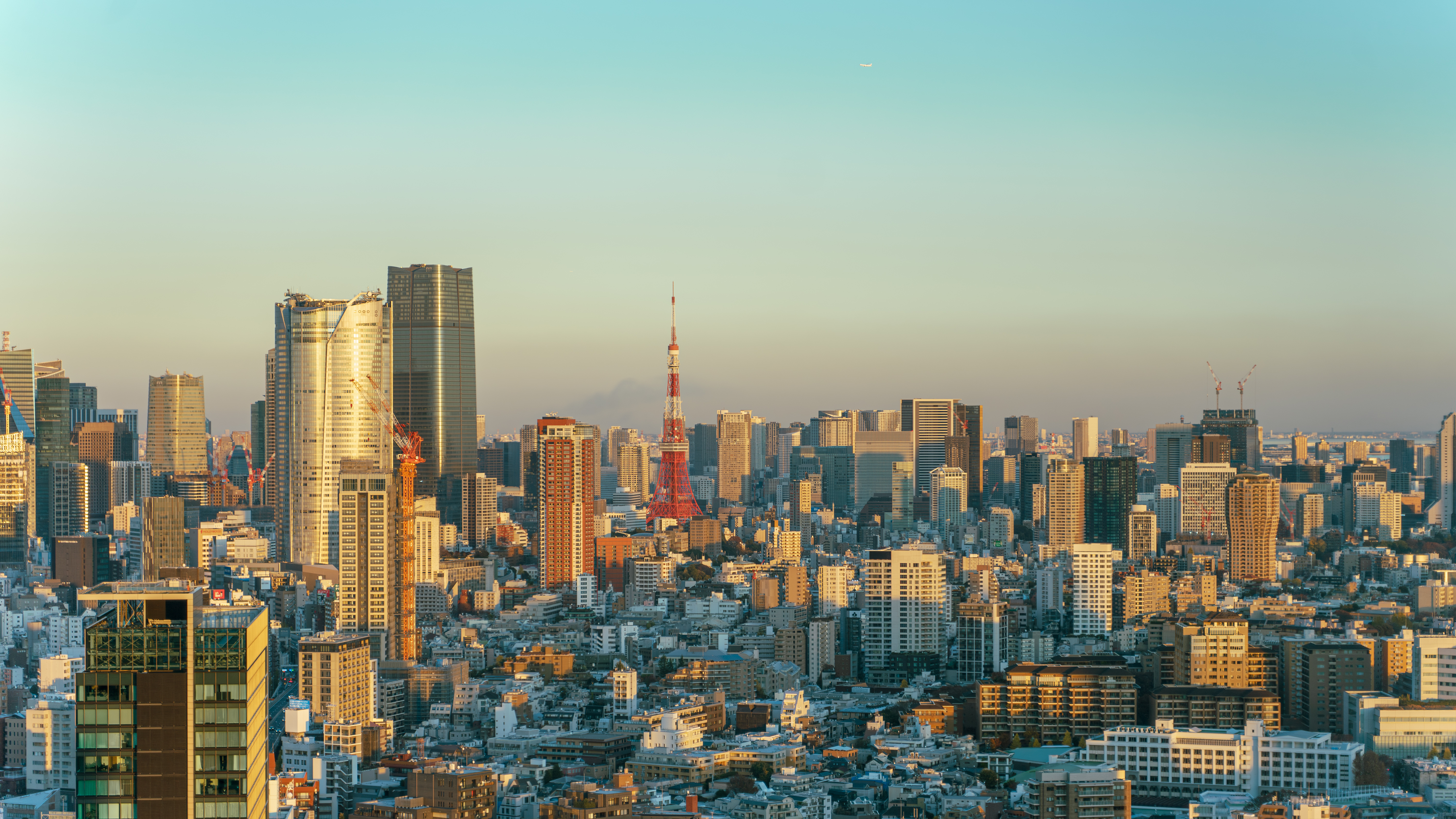
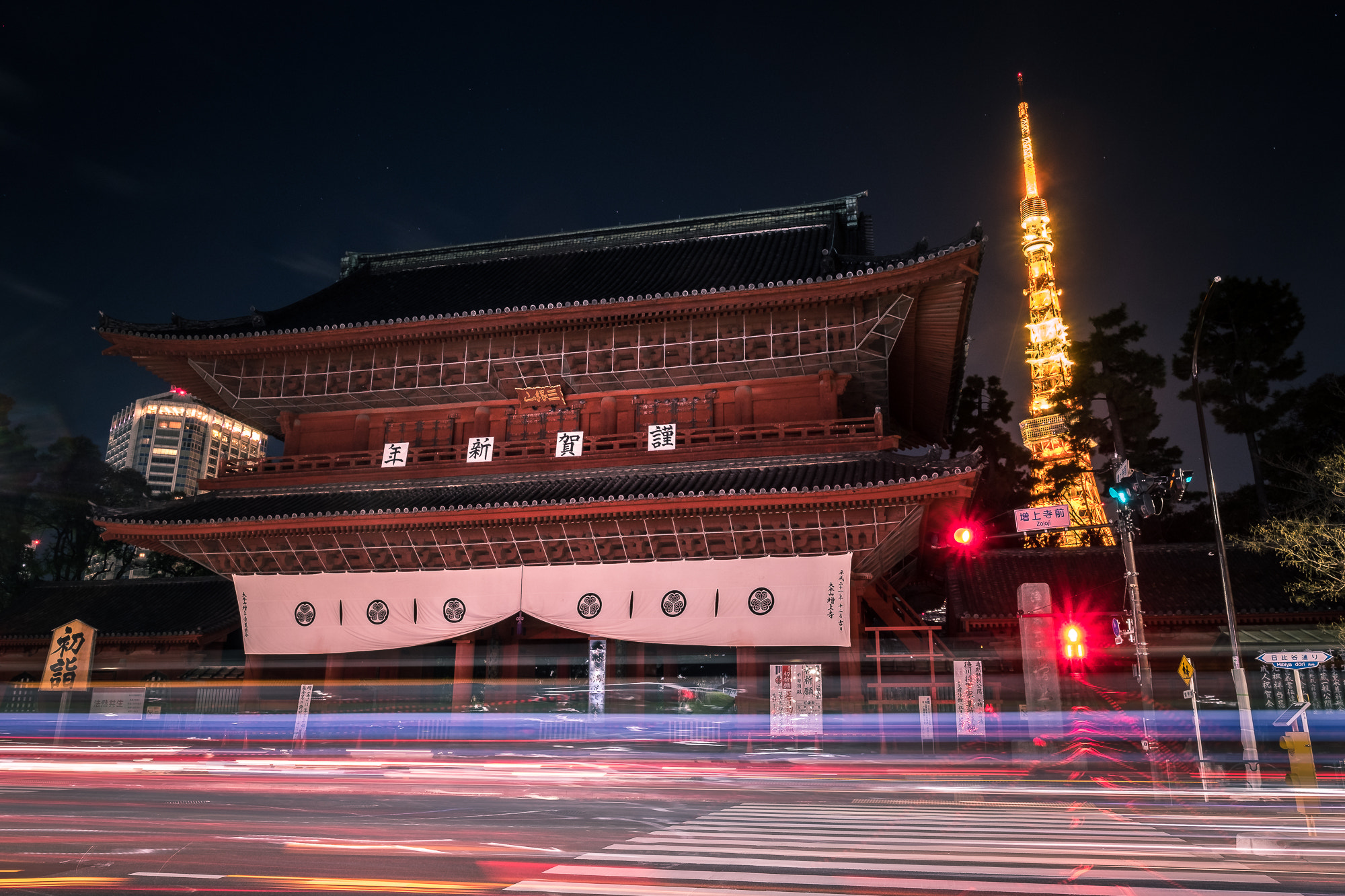
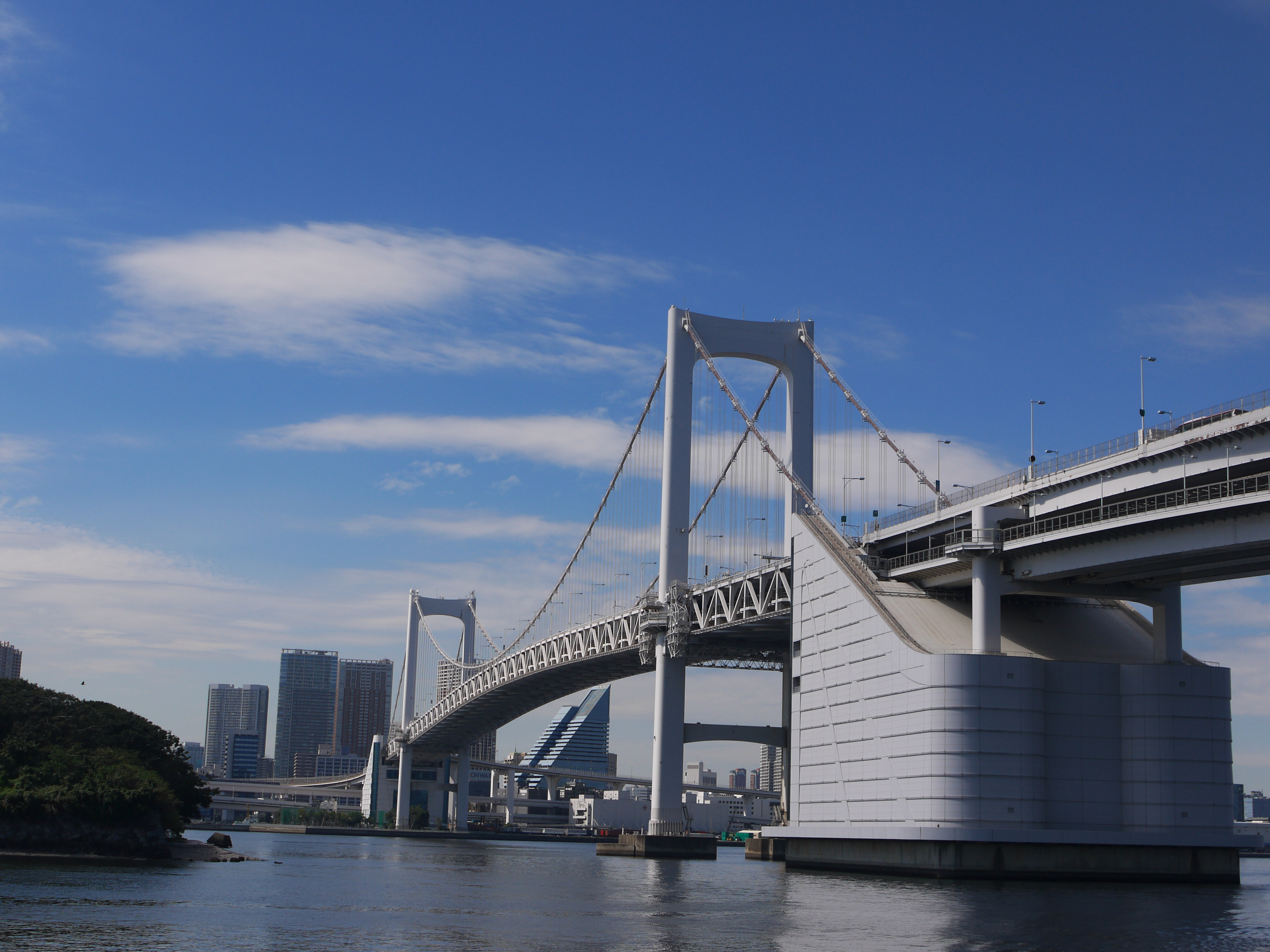
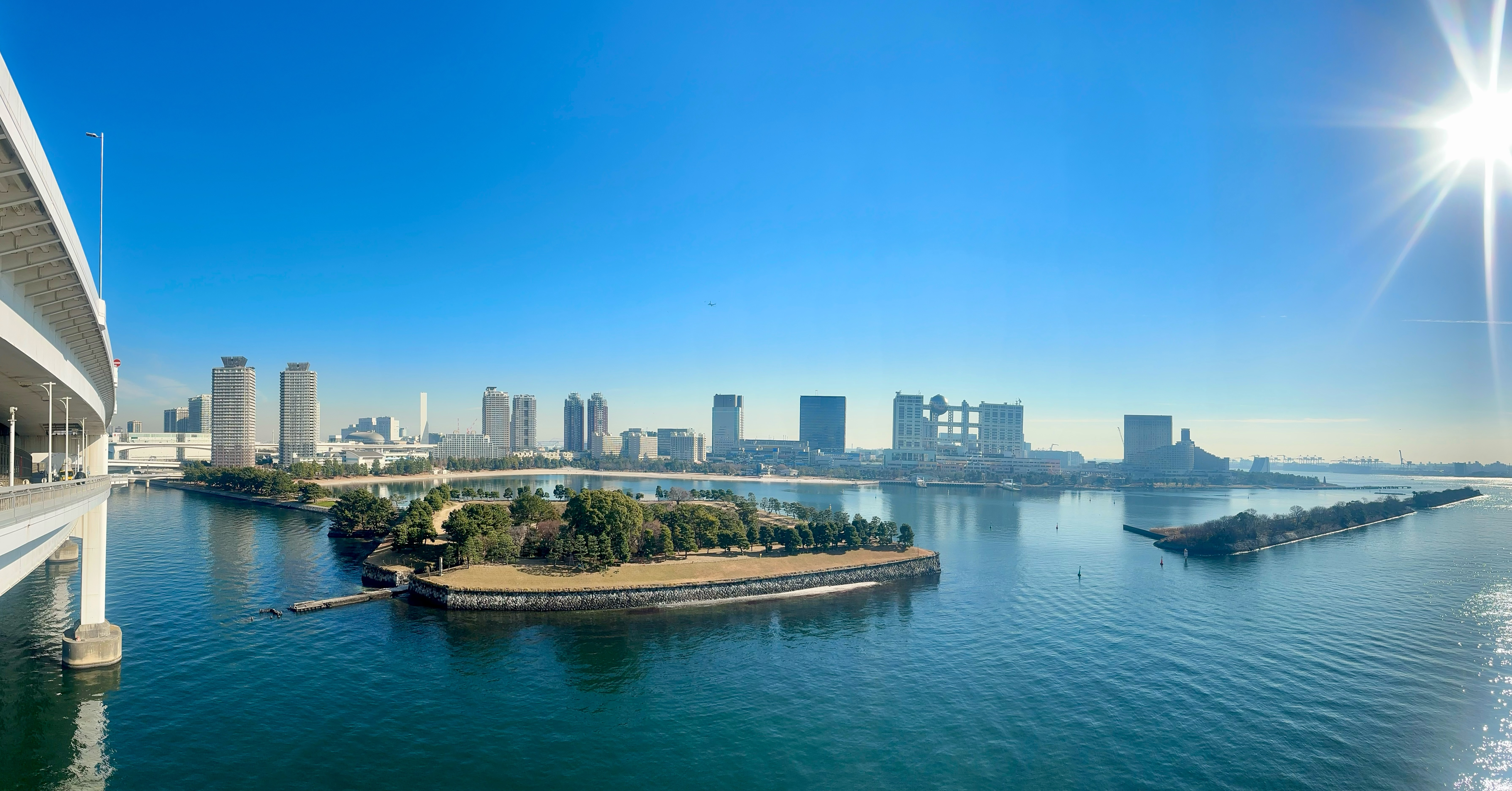
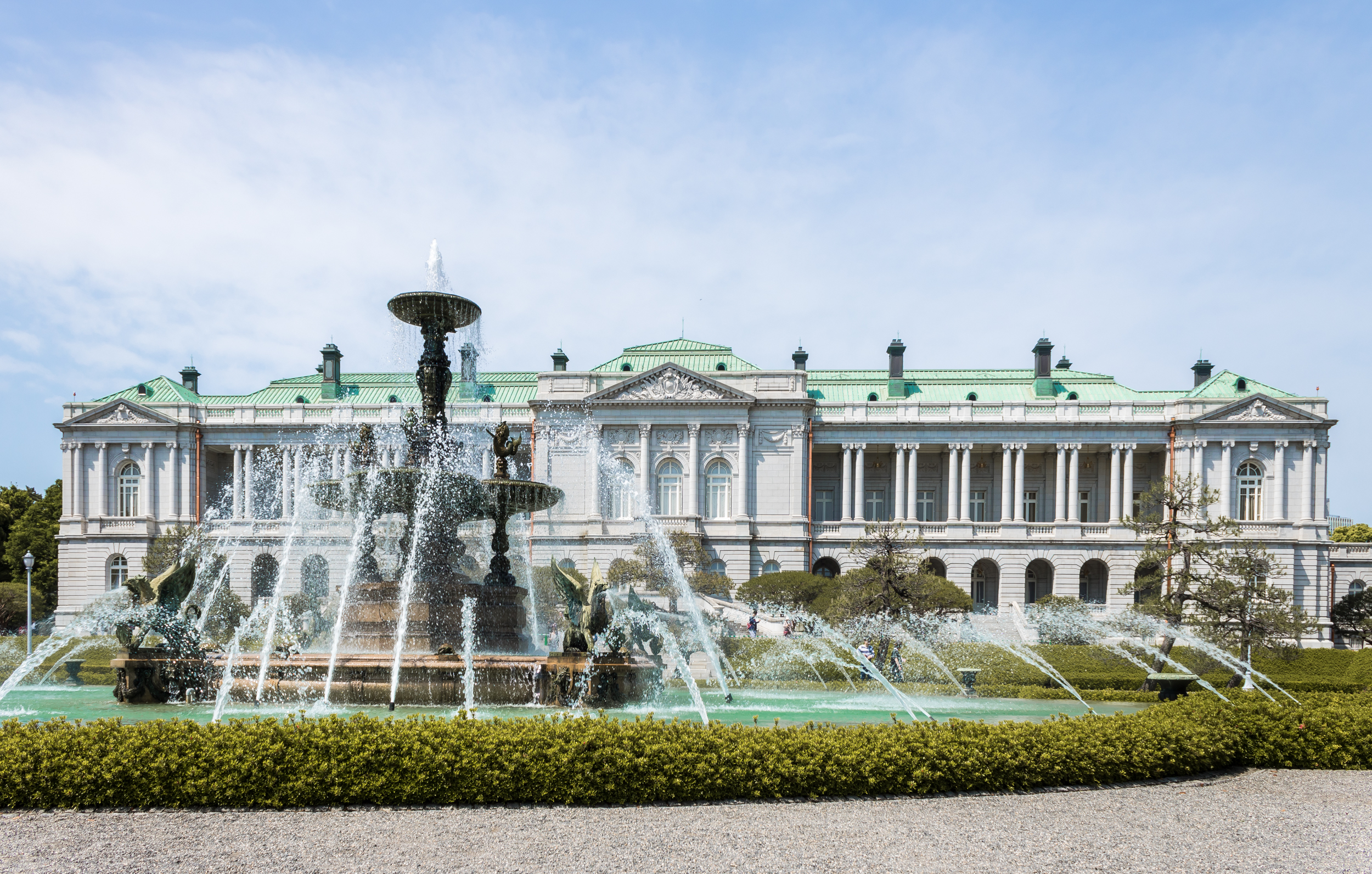
- Roppongi Hills, Azabudai Hills, and Tokyo Tower Zōjō-ji Rainbow Bridge Odaiba Akasaka Palace

- Flag Emblem

- Location of Minato in Tokyo

- Location in Japan
- Coordinates: 35°39′29″N 139°45′05″E
- Country: Japan
- Region: Kantō
- Prefecture: Tokyo

Government
  - Mayor: Ai Seike (since 28 June 2024)

Area
  - Total: 20.37 km^{2} (7.86 sq mi)

Population (1 October 2020)
  - Total: 260,486
  - Density: 12,790/km^{2} (33,120/sq mi)
- Time zone: UTC+09:00 (JST)
- City hall address: 1-5-25 Shibakōen, Minato, Tokyo; 105-8511
- Website: www.city.minato.tokyo.jp
- Symbols
- Flower: Hydrangea macrophylla Rosa
- Tree: Cornus florida

Minato (港区, Minato-ku; Japanese pronunciation: [mʲì.nä́.tó̞(.kɯ̈̀), mʲí.nä̀.tò̞] (Note: The placename has both these pronunciations. The common noun meaning 'harbor' is only [mʲì.nä́.tó̞], and the family name is only [mʲí.nä̀.tò̞].)) is a special ward of Tokyo, Japan. It is also called Minato City in English.

Minato was formed in 1947 as a merger of Akasaka, Azabu and Shiba wards following Tokyo City's transformation into Tokyo Metropolis. The modern Minato ward exhibits the contrasting Shitamachi and Yamanote geographical and cultural division. The Shinbashi neighborhood in the ward's northeastern corner is attached to the core of Shitamachi, the original commercial center of Edo-Tokyo. On the other hand, the Azabu and Akasaka areas are typically representative Yamanote districts.

As of 1 September 2025, Minato had an official population of 269,708, and a population density of 13,235 persons per km^{2}. The total area is 20.37 km^{2}.

Known as one of Tokyo's largest business areas, Minato is home to the headquarters of many large domestic companies, including Honda, Mitsubishi Motors Corporation, NEC, Nikon, SoftBank Group, Sony and Fujitsu. Minato is also known for being one of the wealthiest residential areas in Japan, and for its relatively high concentration of foreign expats due to the number of embassies and multinational corporations located in and around the area. Notable neighborhoods and districts of Minato include Akasaka, Aoyama, Azabu, Roppongi and Toranomon.

== Geography ==
Minato is located southwest of the Imperial Palace and has boundaries with the special wards of Chiyoda, Chūō, Kōtō (in Odaiba), Shinagawa, Shibuya, and Shinjuku.

== History ==
The ward was founded on March 15, 1947, with the merger of Akasaka, Azabu, and Shiba Wards. Various names were considered for the new ward, such as Atago, Aoyama, Aoba, Iikura, Mita, and Higashiminato. Higashiminato was chosen, meaning "East Harbor", but then Higashi was cut leading to the name Minato, simply meaning "harbor".

== Demographics ==
Per Japanese census data, the population has recently begun rising after decades of rapid decline.

Historical population
Year	Pop.	±%
1908	253,453	—
1920	330,004	+30.2%
1930	322,487	−2.3%
1940	336,312	+4.3%
1945	96,604	−71.3%
1950	216,120	+123.7%
1960	267,024	+23.6%
1970	223,978	−16.1%
1980	201,257	−10.1%
1990	158,499	−21.2%
2000	159,398	+0.6%
2010	205,131	+28.7%
2020	260,486	+27.0%
2025	272,478	+4.6%
Source: Censuses (Note: For populations prior to 1950, the combined data for the two former wards of Shiba-ku, Azabu-ku and Akasaka-ku within Tokyo City are calculated.)

== Politics and government ==
In June 2024, Ai Seike beat Masaaki Takei in mayoral elections. Takei, mayor since 2004, was seeking his sixth term and received support from the Liberal Democratic Party and Komeito. Seike, previously a member of the ward assembly, is the first female mayor of Minato.

The ward assembly has 34 members.

=== Elections ===
- 2008 Minato mayoral election

== Districts and neighborhoods ==
Akasaka Area

- Akasaka
- Kitaaoyama
- Minamiaoyama
- Motoakasaka

Azabu Area

- Azabudai
- Azabu-Jūban
- Azabu-Mamianachō
- Azabu-Nagasakachō
- Higashiazabu
- Minamiazabu
- Motoazabu
- Nishiazabu
- Roppongi

Shiba Area

- Atago
- Hamamatsuchō
- Higashishinbashi
- Kaigan^{a}
- Mita^{b}
- Nishishinbashi
- Shiba
- Shibadaimon
- Shibakōen
- Shinbashi
- Shiodome
- Toranomon

Shibaura-Kōnan Area

- Daiba^{*}
- Kaigan^{c, *}
- Kōnan^{*}
- Shibaura^{*}

Takanawa Area

- Mita^{d, *}
- Shirokane^{*}
- Shirokanedai^{*}
- Takanawa^{*}

Notes:

^{*} - formerly part of Shiba Area
^{a} - 1-chōme
^{b} - 1, 2, 3-chōme
^{c} - 2, 3-chōme
^{d} - 4, 5-chōme

== Education ==
=== Colleges and universities ===
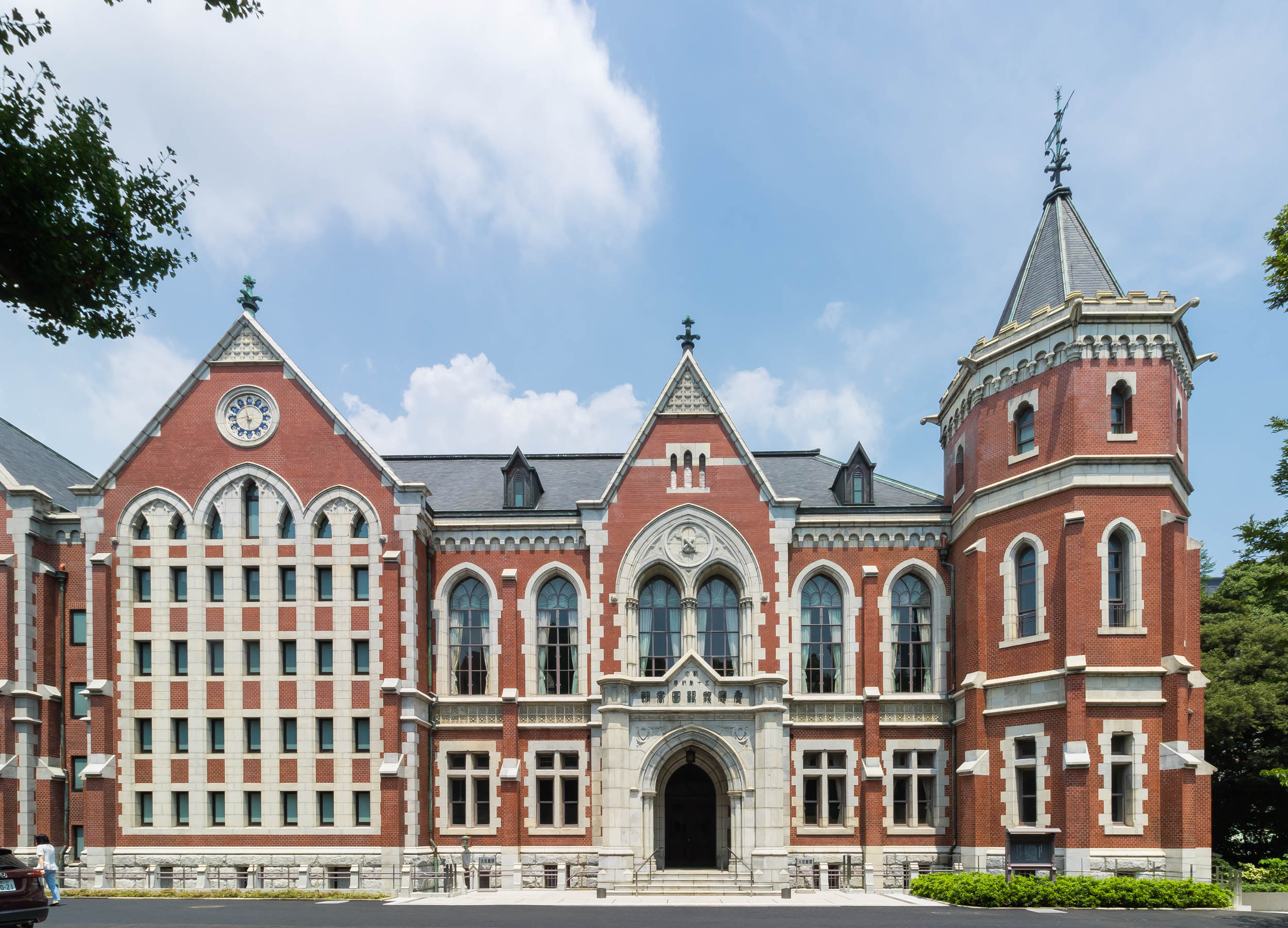
Keio University library

- Jikei University School of Medicine Nishi Shinbashi campus
- Kanazawa Institute of Technology Graduate school; Toranomon campus
- Keio University
- Kitasato University Shirokane campus
- Meiji Gakuin University Shirokane campus
- National Graduate Institute for Policy Studies (GRIPS)
- Shibaura Institute of Technology
- Temple University Japan Campus
- Tokyo Institute of Technology Tamachi Campus
- Tokyo University of Marine Science and Technology Shinagawa campus
- University of Tokyo Institute of Medical Science

=== Primary and secondary schools ===
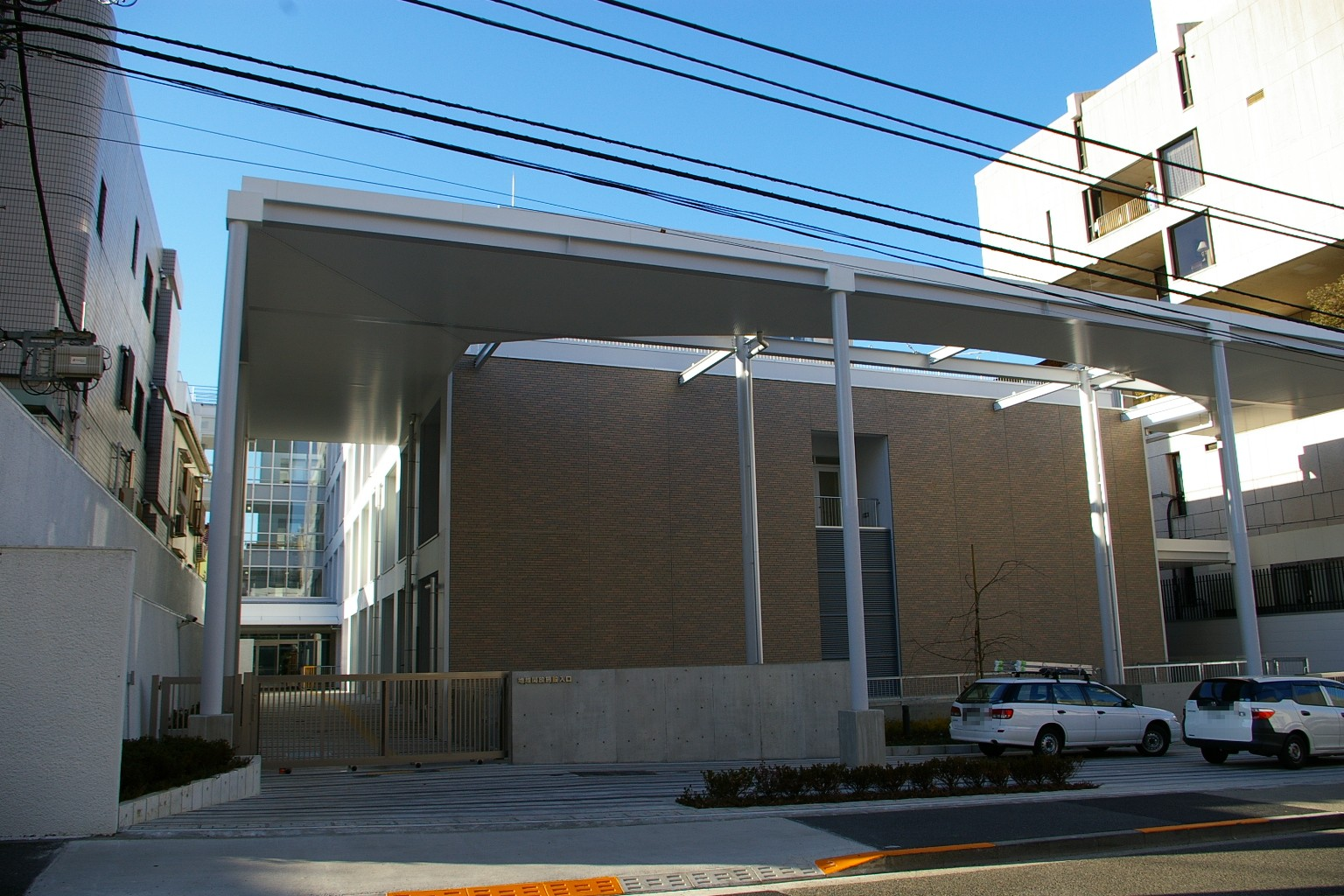
Mita Junior High School

The local public high schools are operated by the Tokyo Metropolitan Government Board of Education.

- Akasaka High School (東京都立赤坂高等学校) (since merged with another school)
- Mita High School (東京都立三田高等学校)
- Roppongi High School
- Shiba Commercial High School (東京都立芝商業高等学校)

The city's public elementary and junior high schools are operated by the Minato City Board of Education (港区教育委員会).

Combined elementary and junior high schools:

- Odaiba Gakuen (お台場学園)
- Shirokane-no-oka Gakuen (白金の丘学園)

Junior high schools:

- Akasaka Junior High School (赤坂中学校)
- Aoyama Junior High School (青山中学校)
- Konan Junior High School (港南中学校)
- Koryo Junior High School (高陵中学校)
- Mita Junior High School (三田中学校) opened in 2001 after the merger of Minato Junior High School and Shibahama Junior High School.
- Onarimon Junior High School (御成門中学校)
- Roppongi Junior High School (六本木中学校)
- Takamatsu Junior High School (高松中学校)

Elementary schools:

- Akabane Elementary School (赤羽小学校)
- Akasaka Elementary School (赤坂小学校)
- Aoyama Elementary School (青山小学校)
- Azabu Elementary School (麻布小学校)
- Higashimachi Elementary School (東町小学校)
- Hommura Elementary School (本村小学校)
- Kogai Elementary School (笄小学校)
- Konan Elementary School (港南小学校)
- Mita Elementary School (御田小学校)
- Nanzan Elementary School (南山小学校)
- Onarimon Elementary School (御成門小学校)
- Seinan Elementary School (青南小学校)
- Shiba Elementary School (芝小学校)
- Shibaura Elementary School (芝浦小学校)
- Shibahama Elementary School (芝浜小学校)
- Shirokane Elementary School (白金小学校)
- Takanawadai Elementary School (高輪台小学校) occupies a historic building that had been renovated.

Former schools:

- Asahi Junior High School (朝日中学校)
- Iikura Elementary School (飯倉小学校)
- Koyo Elementary School (港陽小学校)
- Sanko Elementary School (三光小学校)
- Shinno Elementary School (神応小学校)

There are also a variety of private schools, including:

- Keio Girls Senior High School
- Keiō Chutobu Junior High School (慶應義塾中等部)
- Shiba Junior and Senior High School
- Azabu Junior and Senior High School
- The British School of Tokyo Azabudai Hills Campus (primary school levels)
- Friends School, a Quaker school established in 1887.
- Meiji Gakuin Senior High School in Shirokane
- Russian Embassy School in Tokyo in Azabudai
- Tokyo Joshi Gakuen Junior & Senior High School

=== Public libraries ===
The city operates the Minato Library, the Mita Library, the Azabu Library, the Akasaka Library, the Takanawa Library, and the Konan Library. The metropolis operates the Tokyo Metropolitan Library Central Library in Minato. The library opened in 1973.

== Economy ==
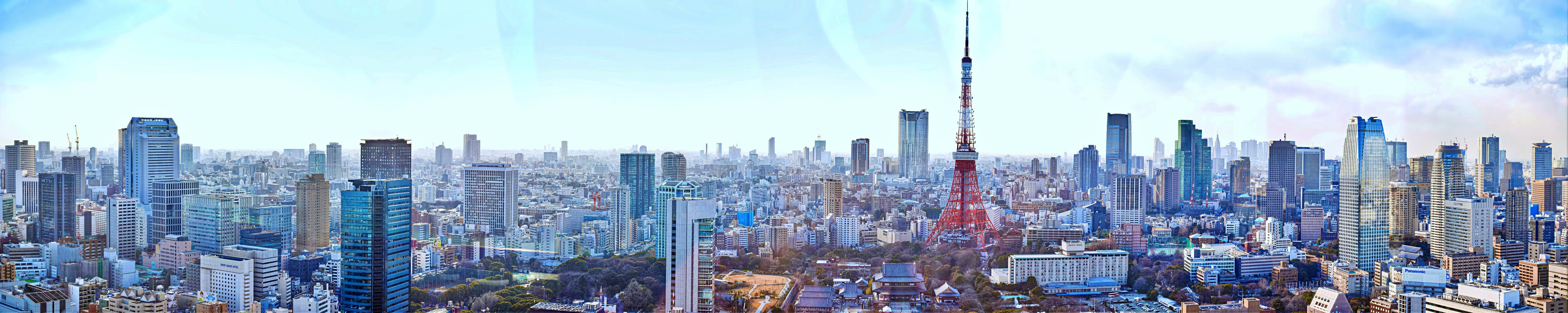
Panorama view of Minato

Companies with headquarters in Minato include Air Nippon, All Nippon Airways (ANA), ANA & JP Express, All Nippon Airways Trading, Animax, Asmik Ace Entertainment, Bandai Namco Holdings, Brainlab, Cosmo Oil Company, COVER Corporation, Daicel, Dentsu, Euglena (company), FamilyMart, Fujifilm, Fuji Xerox, Fujitsu, Haseko, Hazama Ando, Honda, Japan Tobacco, Kajima, Kaneka Corporation, Konami, KYB Corporation, Kyodo News, Mitsubishi Motors, Mitsui Chemicals, Mitsui O.S.K. Lines, Mitsui Oil Exploration Company, NEC, Nippon Sheet Glass, NYK Line, Obayashi Corporation, Oki Electric Industry, Pizza-La, The Pokémon Company, THK, Toagosei, Toraya Confectionery, Sato Pharmaceutical, Sega Sammy Holdings, Sigma Seven, Sony, SUMCO, Toraya Confectionery, Toyo Suisan (owns the branch Maruchan), TV Tokyo, WOWOW, and Yazaki. In addition ANA subsidiary Air Japan has some offices in Minato.

=== Foreign companies ===
The Japanese division of CB&I, the Japanese division of Aramark and Aim Services, Google Japan, Yahoo! Japan, and the main Japanese offices of Hanjin and Korean Air are located there. Air France operates an office and ticketing counter in the New Aoyama Building in Minato. The Japanese division of Deutsche Post, DHL. Air France's Minato office handles Aircalin-related inquiries. Air China has operations in the Air China Building in Minato. Asiana Airlines operates a sales office on the sixth floor of the ATT New Tower Building. Hawaiian Airlines has its Japan offices in the Eagle Hamamatsuchō Building (イーグル浜松町ビル, Īguru Hamamatsuchō Biru) in Minato. Iran Air has its Tokyo office in Akasaka.

=== Former economic operations ===
Japanese companies that formerly had headquarters in Minato include Air Next, Airtransse, Asatsu, Jaleco Holding, Ricoh, Toa Domestic Airlines (later Japan Air System and later Japan Air Lines),

On December 22, 2008, operations of Seiko Epson's Tokyo sales office began at Seiko Epson's Hino Office in Hino, Tokyo. Previously operations were at the World Trade Centre in Minato.

== Diplomatic missions ==
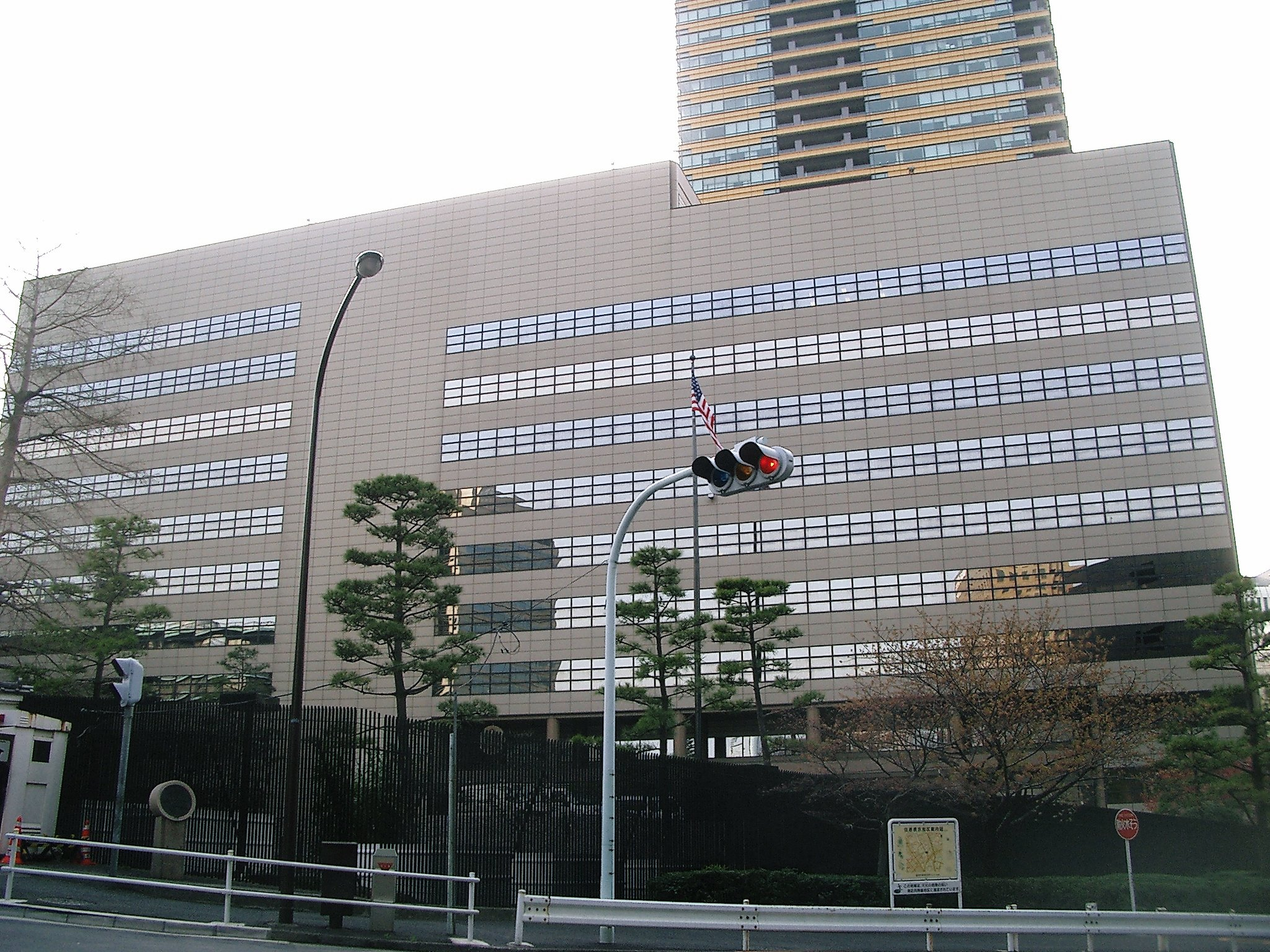
Embassy of the United States in Japan

Several countries operate their embassies in Minato.

- Afghanistan
- Argentina
- Armenia
- Australia
- Austria
- Bahrain
- Bolivia
- Bosnia and Herzegovina
- Botswana
- Brazil
- Brunei
- Cambodia
- Canada
- Chile
- China
- DR Congo
- Costa Rica
- Cuba
- Cyprus
- Dominican Republic
- Ecuador
- El Salvador
- Eritrea
- Ethiopia
- Fiji
- Finland
- France
- Georgia
- Germany
- Ghana
- Greece
- Guatemala
- Haiti
- Honduras
- Hungary
- Iceland
- Iran
- Italy
- Jamaica
- Kazakhstan
- Kosovo
- Kuwait
- Kyrgyzstan
- Laos
- Lebanon
- Lesotho
- Liberia
- Lithuania
- Madagascar
- Malawi
- Maldives
- Malta
- Marshall Islands
- Micronesia
- Morocco
- Namibia
- Netherlands
- Nicaragua
- Nigeria
- Norway
- Pakistan
- Palau
- Panama
- Philippines
- Portugal
- Qatar
- Romania
- Russia
- San Marino
- Saudi Arabia
- Serbia
- Singapore
- Slovakia
- Slovenia
- South Korea
- Spain
- Sri Lanka
- Sweden
- Switzerland
- Syria
- Republic of China (Taiwan)
- Tonga
- Ukraine
- United States
- Uruguay
- Uzbekistan
- Venezuela
- Yemen
- Zimbabwe

== Places ==
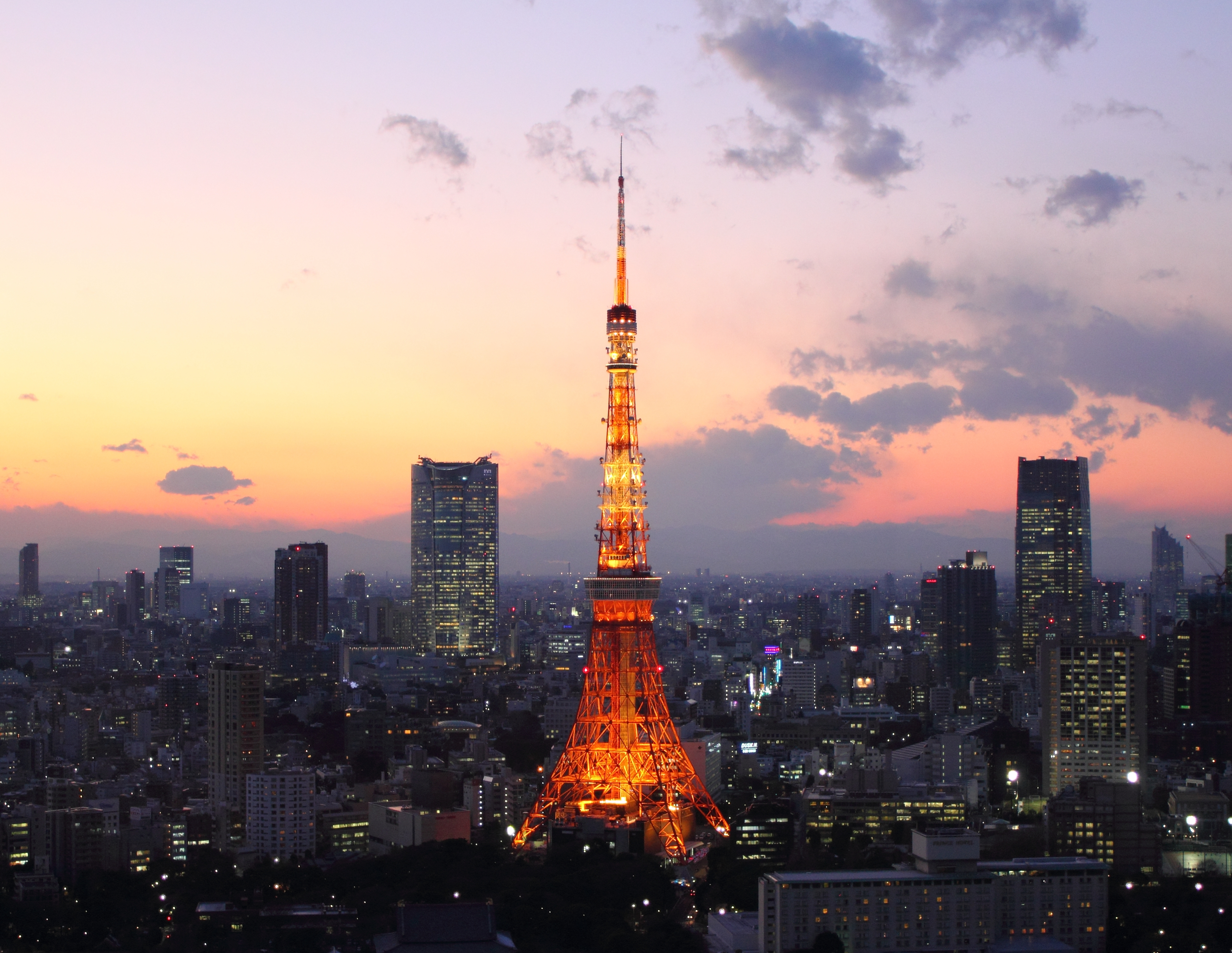
Tokyo Tower

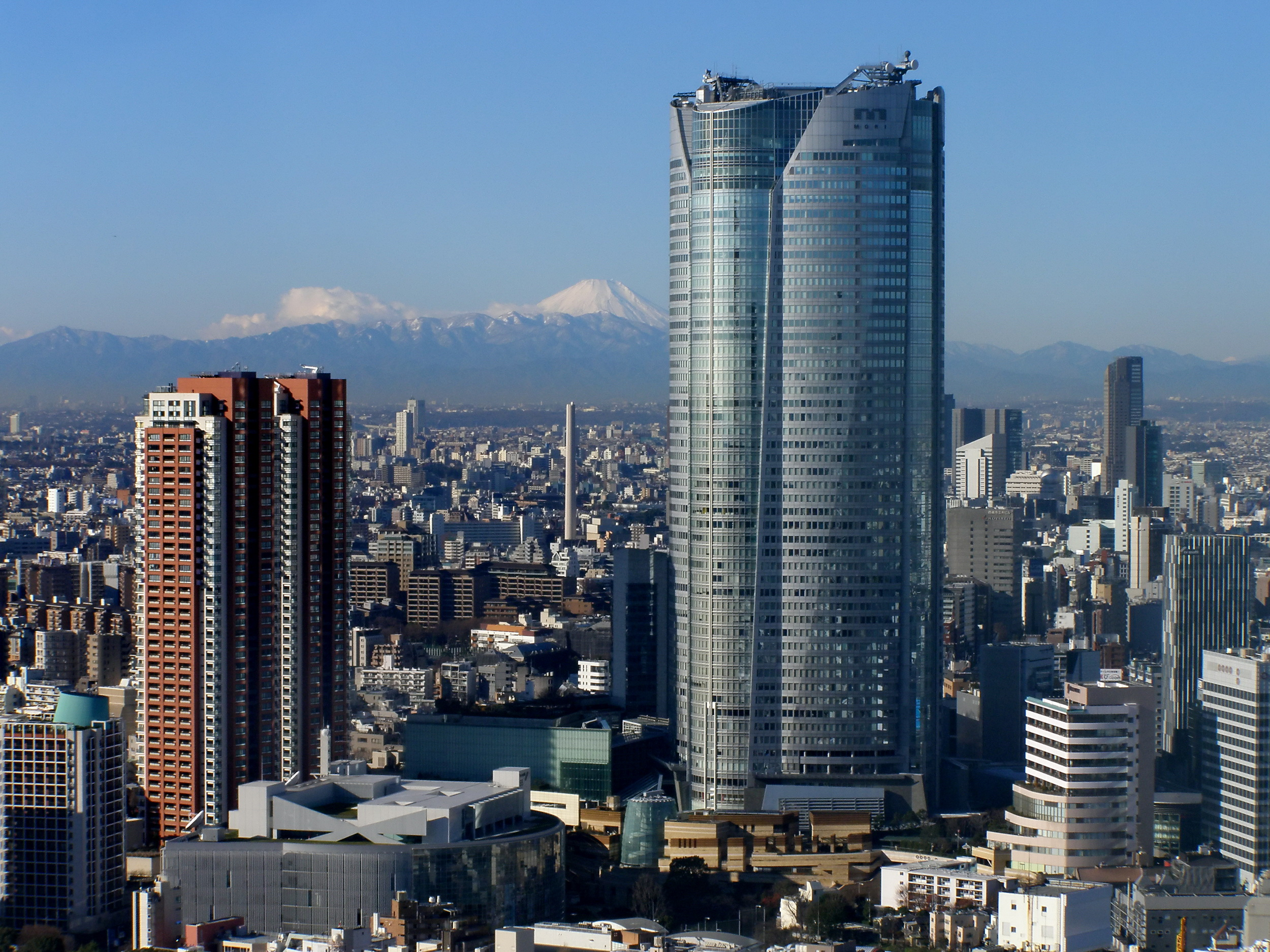
Roppongi Hills

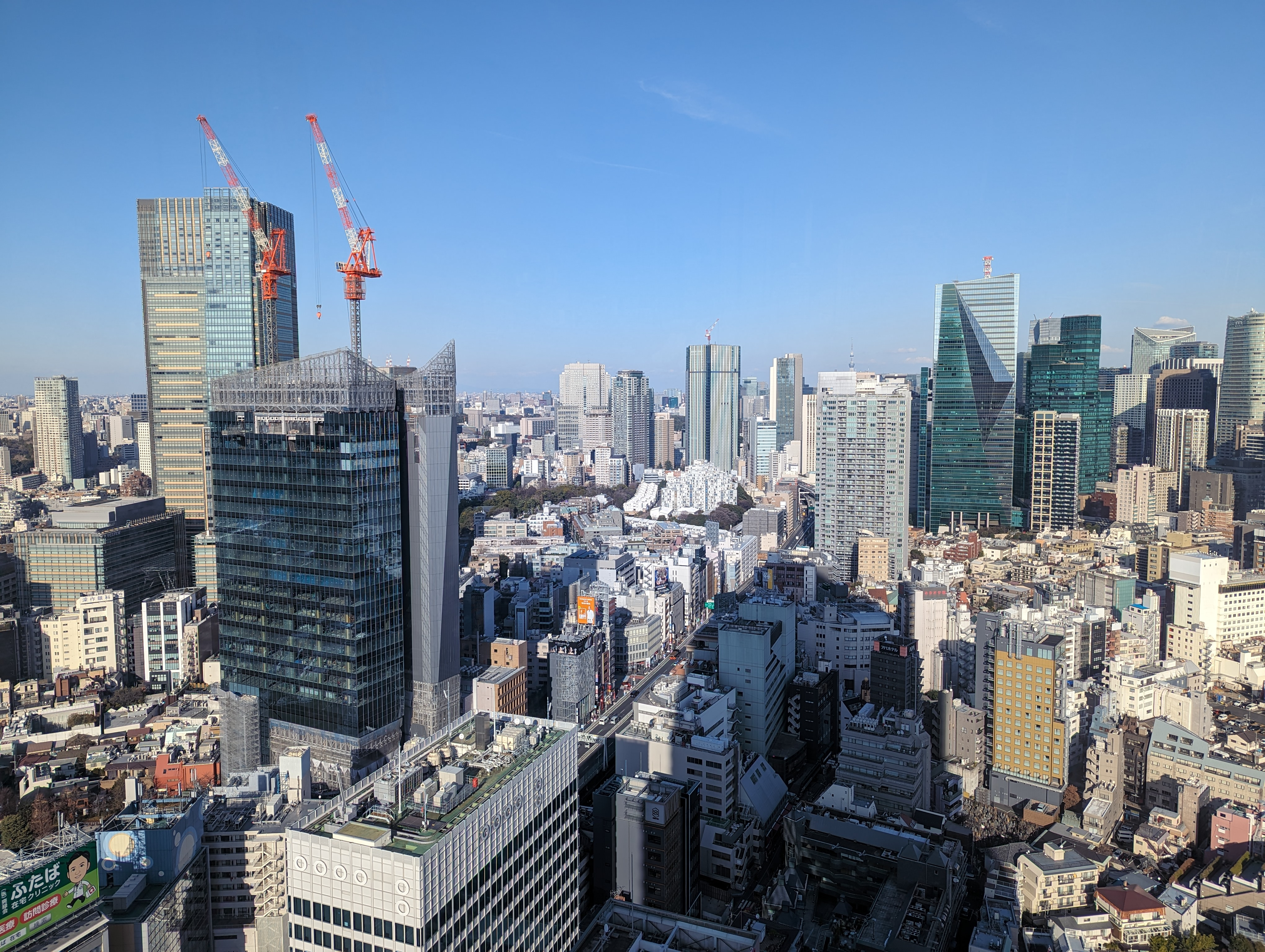
Buildings in Roppongi

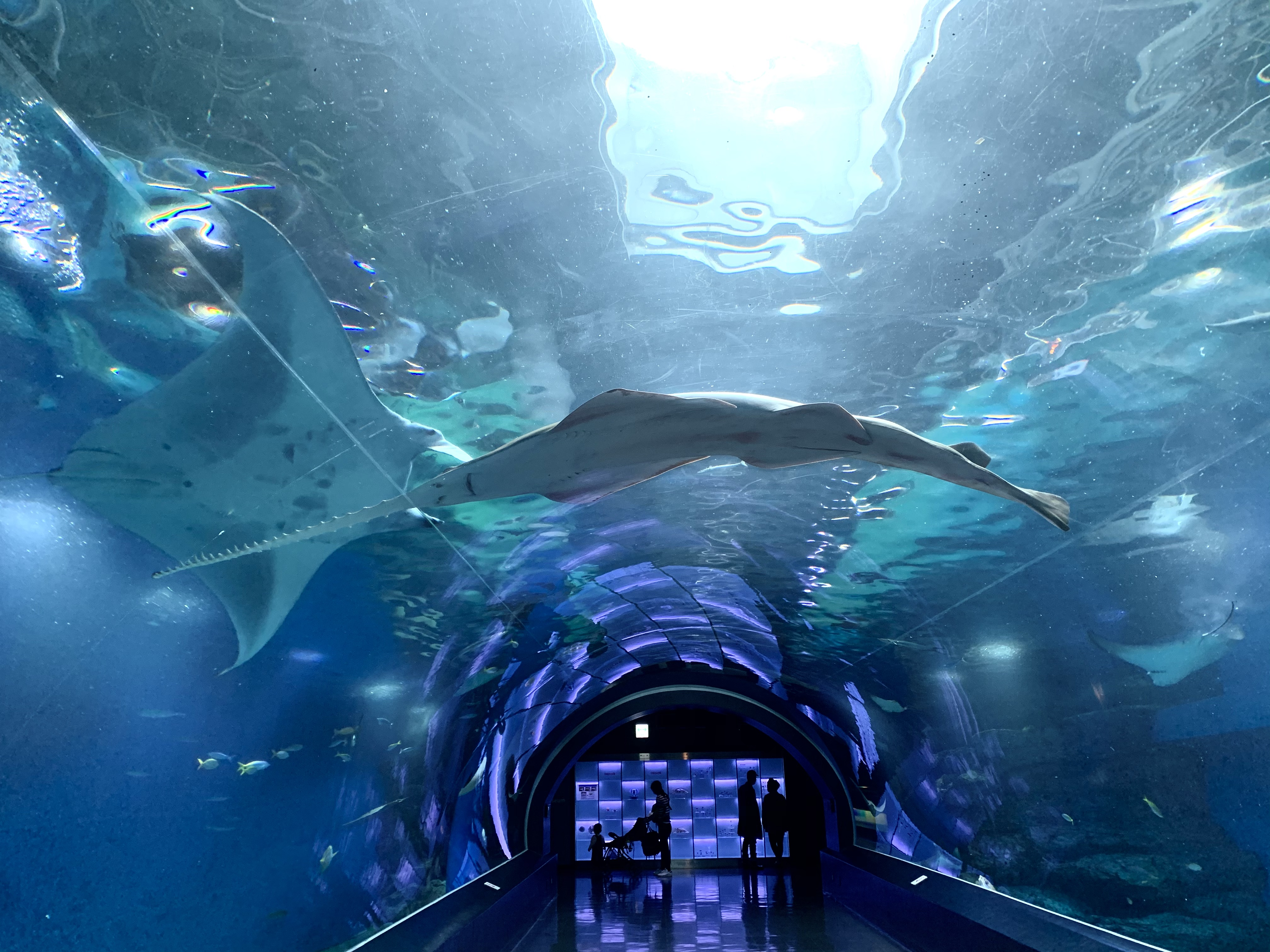
Aqua Park Shinagawa

- Akasaka is a large residential and commercial area in northern Minato which includes the Akasaka Palace and surrounding gardens, TBS radio and television studios, Ark Hills complex, Tokyo Midtown, and the embassy of the United States.
- Aoyama is home to Aoyama Cemetery, one of Tokyo's largest graveyards, and the Chichibunomiya Rugby Stadium.
- Atago Shrine is the highest point in all 23 wards of Tokyo.
- Azabu is one of Tokyo's more upscale residential areas, home to many embassies.
- Fushimi Sanpō Inari Jinja is a Shinto shrine in Shiba 3-chōme.
- Hamamatsuchō is the location of Hamamatsucho Station is the terminal for the Tokyo Monorail to Haneda Airport.
- Mita is home to Keio University and several small Buddhist temples.
- The National Art Center, Tokyo is a museum that opened in 2007.
- Odaiba is one of Tokyo's most popular entertainment areas, featuring the Fuji TV studios, Palette Town shopping complex, Dream Bridge, Tokyo Big Sight, and more. Located on an artificial island in Tokyo Bay, it is connected to central Tokyo by the Yurikamome transit line over the Rainbow Bridge.
- Roppongi is Tokyo's best-known nightlife district, especially popular among foreigners; home to National Art Center, also home to the Roppongi Hills complex, which houses the studios of TV Asahi, the J-Wave radio station, the Tokyo Grand Hyatt Hotel, and a shopping complex.
- Shiba Park houses the Zojoji temple. Tokyo Tower is located one block away.
- Shinbashi Station, in Shinbashi, is the northern terminal of Japan's first railway line. Also home to the Shiosite office and entertainment complex, which houses Nippon Television studios.
- Shirokanedai is home to Meiji Gakuin University.
- Takanawa is home to the Sōtō Temple of Sengaku-ji. Shinagawa Station, one of Tokyo's largest train stations, is located in Takanawa, although it is associated with Shinagawa to the south. It is an area of many 1980s hotels including the Grand Prince Hotel Takanawa, Grand Prince Hotel New Takanawa, and Pacific Meridien Hotel, Shinagawa Prince Hotel.
- There is an urban aquarium called Aqua Park Shinagawa on the premises of the Shinagawa Prince Hotel, and the number of visitors exceeds 1.5 million annually.
- Toranomon houses the National Printing Bureau, TV Tokyo studios and the Toranomon Station underground complex.

== Transportation ==
=== Rail ===
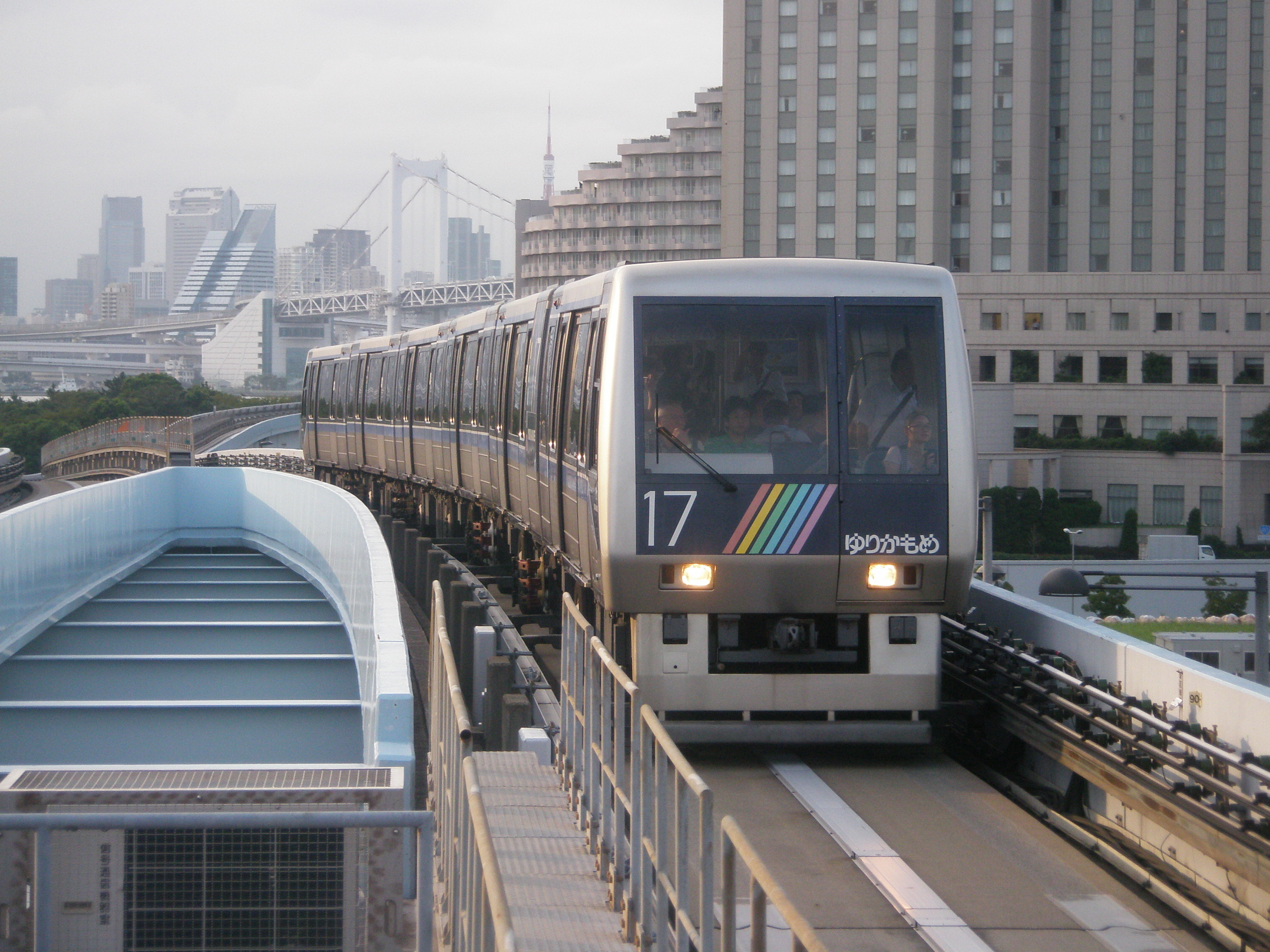
Yurikamome

- Keikyu Main Line (Shinagawa Station)
- Toei Subway:
  - Toei Asakusa Line (Shimbashi Station, Daimon Station, Mita Station, Sengakuji Station, Takanawadai Station)
  - Toei Oedo Line (Shiodome Station, Daimon Station, Akabanebashi Station, Azabu-juban Station, Roppongi Station, Aoyama-itchome Station)
  - Toei Mita Line (Uchisaiwaicho Station, Onarimon Station, Shiba-koen Station, Mita Station, Shirokane-Takanawa Station, Shirokanedai Station)
- Tokyo Metro:
  - Tokyo Metro Chiyoda Line (Akasaka Station, Nogizaka Station, Omotesando Station)
  - Tokyo Metro Ginza Line (Shimbashi Station, Toranomon Station, Tameike-sanno Station, Akasaka-mitsuke Station, Aoyama-itchome Station, Gaienmae Station, Omotesando Station)
  - Tokyo Metro Hanzomon Line (Aoyama-itchome Station, Omotesando Station)
  - Tokyo Metro Hibiya Line (Kamiyacho Station, Roppongi Station, Hiroo Station)
  - Tokyo Metro Marunouchi Line (Akasaka-mitsuke Station)
  - Tokyo Metro Namboku Line (Tameike-sanno Station, Roppongi-itchome Station, Azabu-juban Station, Shirokane-Takanawa Station, Shirokanedai Station)
- East Japan Railway Company (JR East)
  - Keihin-Tohoku Line/Yamanote Line (Shimbashi Station, Hamamatsucho Station, Tamachi Station, Shinagawa Station)
  - Tōkaidō Main Line (Shimbashi Station, Shinagawa Station)
  - Yokosuka Line (Shimbashi Station, Shinagawa Station)
- Central Japan Railway Company (JR Central)
  - Tōkaidō Shinkansen (Shinagawa Station)
- Tokyo Monorail (Hamamatsucho Station)
- Yurikamome (Shimbashi Station, Shiodome Station, Takeshiba Station, Hinode Station, Shibaura-futō Station, Odaiba-kaihinkōen Station, Daiba Station)

=== Road ===
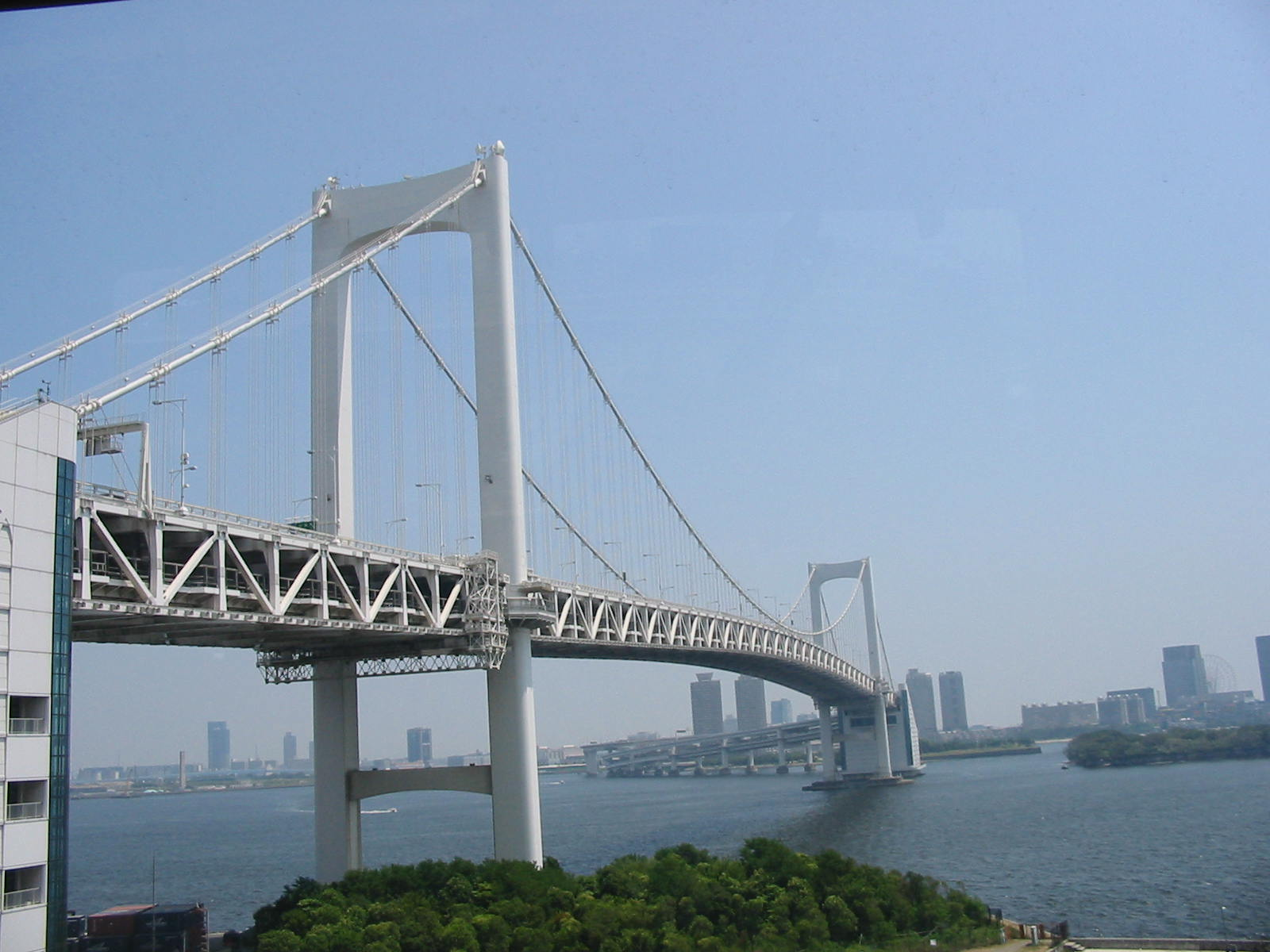
Rainbow Bridge connecting central Tokyo to Odaiba

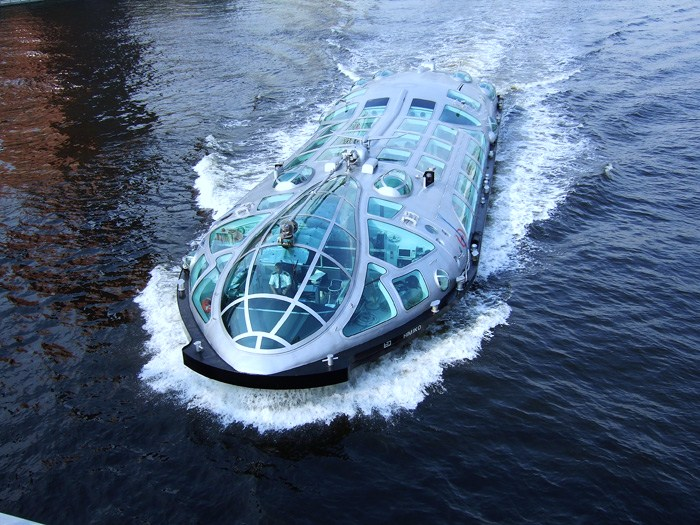
Tokyo Cruise Ship Himiko

- Shuto Expressway:
  - No. 1 Haneda Route (Edobashi JCT – Iriya)
  - No. 2 Meguro Route (Ichinohashi JCT – Togoshi)
  - No.11 Daiba Route (Shibaura JCT – Ariake JCT)
  - B Bayshore Route (Namiki – Kawasaki-ukishima JCT)
  - C1 Inner Loop (Edobashi – Takaracho – Kyobashi – Ginza – Shiodome – Hamazakibashi – Shiba Park – Tanimachi – Kasumigaseki – Daikanmachi – Edobashi)
- National roads:
  - Route 1 (Sakurada-dori)
  - Route 15 (Dai-Ichi Keihin)
  - Route 246 (Aoyama-dori)
- Other major roads:
  - Atago-dori
  - Kaigan-dori
  - Kyu-kaigan-dori
  - Gaien-higashi-dori
  - Gaien-nishi-dori
  - Hibiya-dori
  - Roppongi-dori

=== Ferry ===
Tokyo's main ferry terminal is located adjacent to Takeshiba Station on the Yurikamome, due east of JR Hamamatsucho Station.

== Notable people from Minato ==
- Hirohito, the 124th Emperor of Japan
- Takeichi Nishi, an Imperial Japanese Army officer, equestrian show jumper, and Olympic gold medalist at the 1932 Los Angeles Olympics
- Kanoko Okamoto (1889–1939), poet, born in Akasaka Ward (present-day Minato)
- Hisae Sawachi, writer and activist
- Sho Sakurai, actor and singer, affiliated with Arashi
- Haruomi Hosono, experimental electronic pop musician, noted for the commissioned Muji background music
- Jado, Japanese professional wrestler (New Japan Pro-Wrestling)
- Fishmans, a pop and dub band composed primarily of Shinji Sato, Yuzuru Kashiwabara, Kin-ichi Motegi, Hakase-Sun and Kensuke Ojima
- Nujabes, real name Jun Seba, a record producer, audio engineer, DJ, composer, arranger and pioneer of the hip hop subgenre chillhop or lo-fi
- Taisei Miyashiro, football player
- Cary-Hiroyuki Tagawa, Japanese-American actor and producer
- Yoshimizu Daichi, Buddhist priest
