= Azabudai =

District in Tokyo, Japan

Coordinates: 35°39′38″N 139°44′31″E

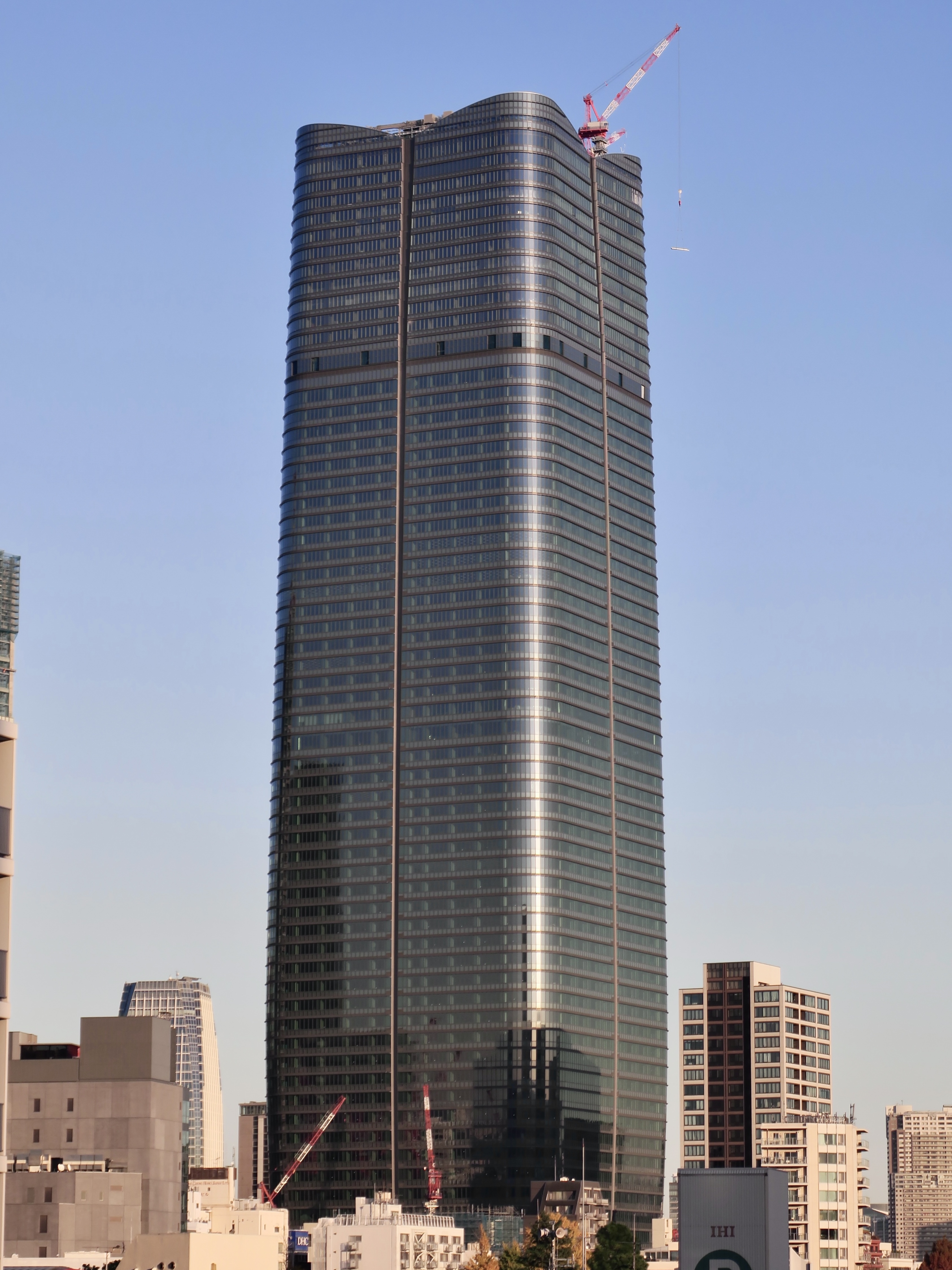
Azabudai Hills Mori JP Tower

Azabudai (麻布台) is a district of Minato, Tokyo, Japan. It consists of 1 to 3-chōme.

The Embassy of the Russian Federation in Japan as well as the Russian Embassy School in Tokyo are both located in Azabudai., as is the Embassy of Afghanistan.

The construction of Azabudai Hills was completed in 2023. Its main building, Mori JP Tower, houses the Azabudai Hills Post Office (formerly known as the Azabu Post Office).

== Education ==
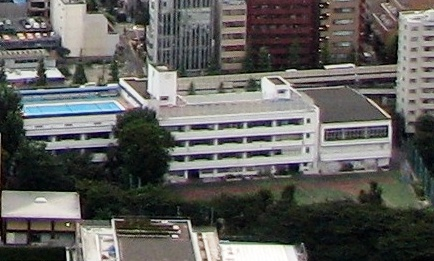
Azabu Elementary School (麻布小学校)

Minato City Board of Education operates public elementary and junior high schools.

Azabudai 1-chōme 1-10-ban, 2-chōme, and 3-chōme are zoned to Azabu Elementary School (麻布小学校) and Roppongi Junior High School (六本木中学校). Azabu-Jūban 1-chōme 11-ban is zoned to Onarimon Elementary School (御成門小学校) and Onarimon Junior High School (御成門中学校).

The British School of Tokyo Azabudai Hills Campus (primary school levels) is in the Azabudai Hills complex.
