= Roppongi High School =

Secondary school in Japan

Coordinates: 35.6578°N 139.7312°E

Roppongi High School Japanese: 東京都立六本木高等学校
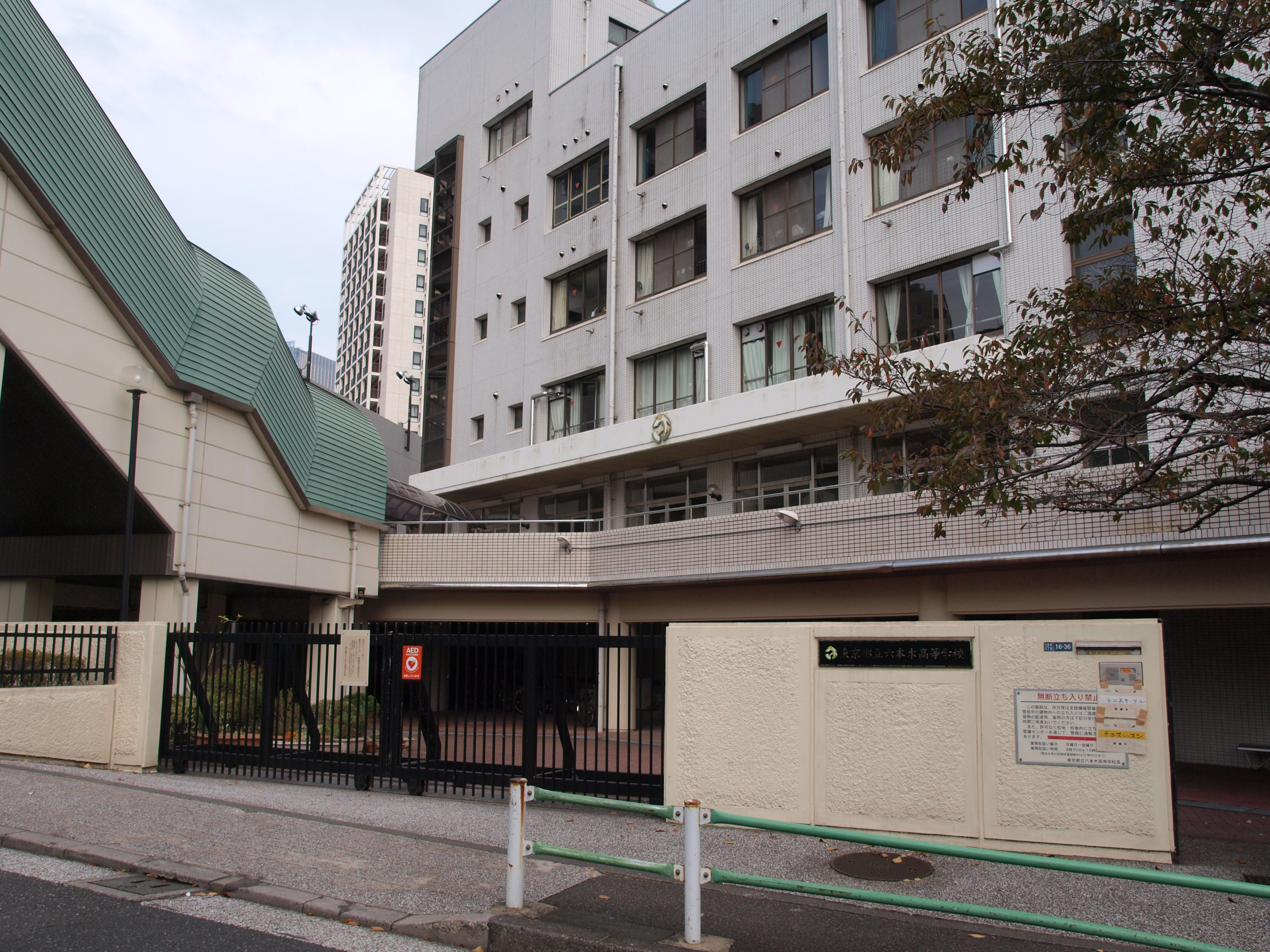

Information
- School type: Secondary school

Tokyo Metropolitan Roppongi High School (東京都立六本木高等学校, Tōkyō Toritsu Roppongi Kōtōgakkō) is a public high school in Roppongi, Minato, Tokyo. It is a part of the Tokyo Metropolitan Government Board of Education.
