= Azabu-Nagasakachō =

Azabu-Nagasakachō 麻布永坂町
- District
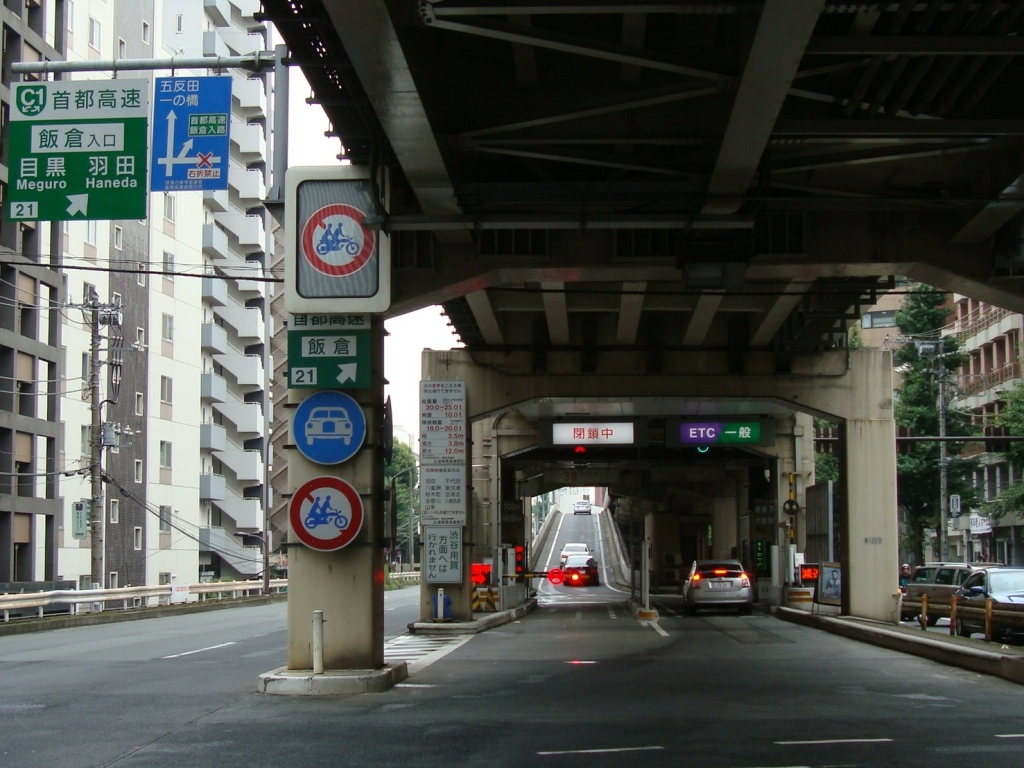
- Iigura entrance
- Interactive map of Azabu-Nagasakachō
- Coordinates: 35.6581°N 139.7378°E
- Country: Japan
- City: Tokyo
- Ward: Minato
- Area: Azabu Area

Population (January 1, 2016)
  - Total: 237
- Time zone: UTC+9 (JST)
- Postal code: 106-0043
- Area code: 03

Azabu-Nagasakachō (麻布永坂町) is a residential district of Minato, Tokyo, Japan. As of November 1, 2007, the total population is 152.

== Education ==
Minato City Board of Education operates public elementary and junior high schools.

Azabu-Nagasakachō is zoned to Azabu Elementary School (麻布小学校) and Roppongi Junior High School (六本木中学校).
