= Higashi-Azabu =

Town located in Minato-ku, Tokyo

Higashi-Azabu (東麻布) is a district of Minato, Tokyo, Japan.

As of February 1, 2020, the population of this district is 5,547. The postal code for Higashi-Azabu is 106-0044.

== Education ==
Minato City Board of Education operates public elementary and junior high schools.

Higashi-Azabu (1-3 chōme) is zoned to Azabu Elementary School (麻布小学校) and Roppongi Junior High School (六本木中学校).

== Notable people from Higashi-Azabu ==
- Cary-Hiroyuki Tagawa, Japanese-American actor and producer (27 September 1950 – 4 December 2025)
