= Tokyo Metropolitan Library =

Public library system in Tokyo, Japan

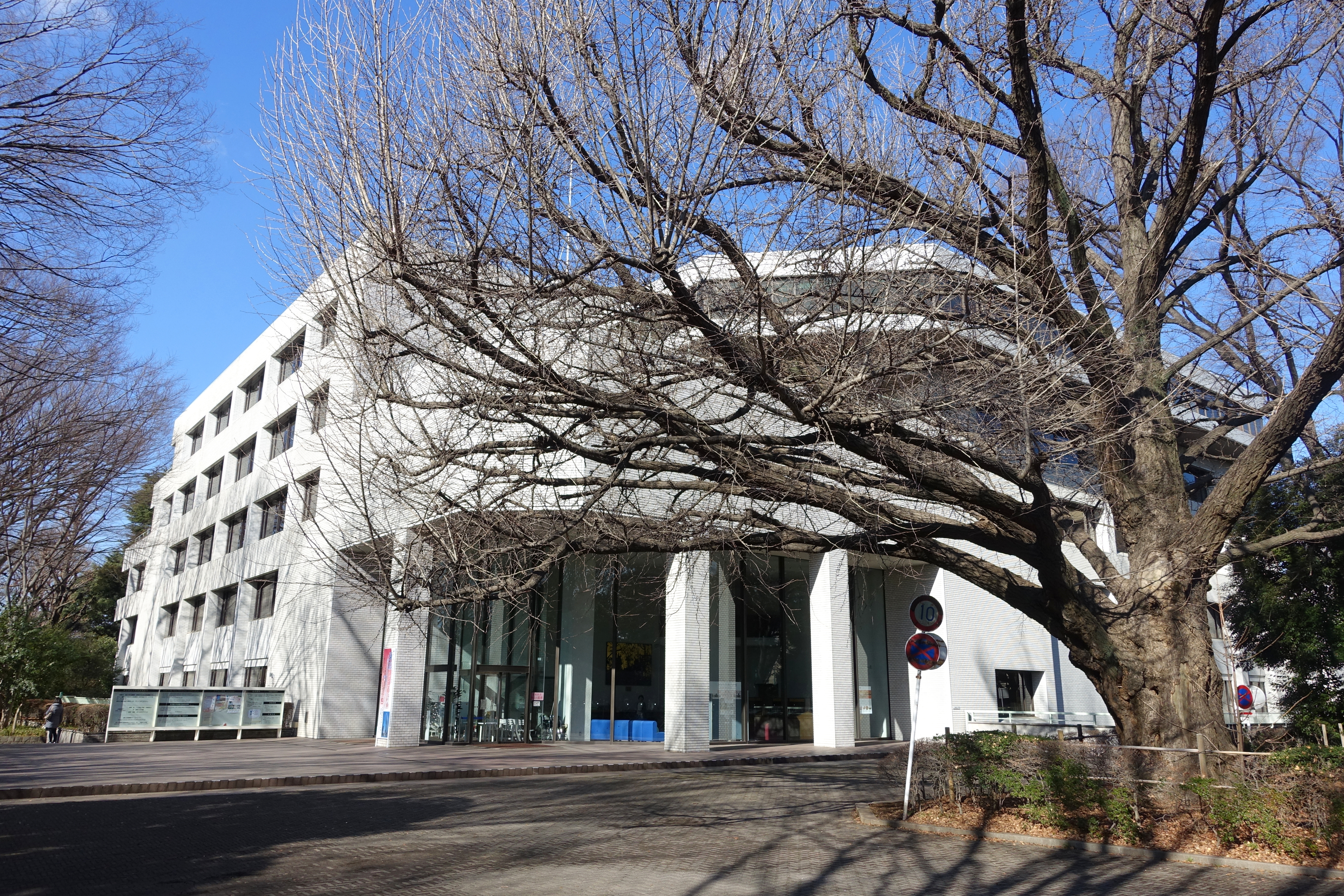
Central Branch of the Tokyo Metropolitan Library

Tokyo Metropolitan Library (東京都立図書館, Tōkyō toritsu toshokan) is the metropolitan public library system for Tokyo, Japan.

== Libraries ==
The Tokyo Metropolitan Library has two branches. The Hibiya Library, a third branch, was closed on April 1, 2009. Both branches provide access to free public Wi-Fi, printing and photocopying services, and public computer access.

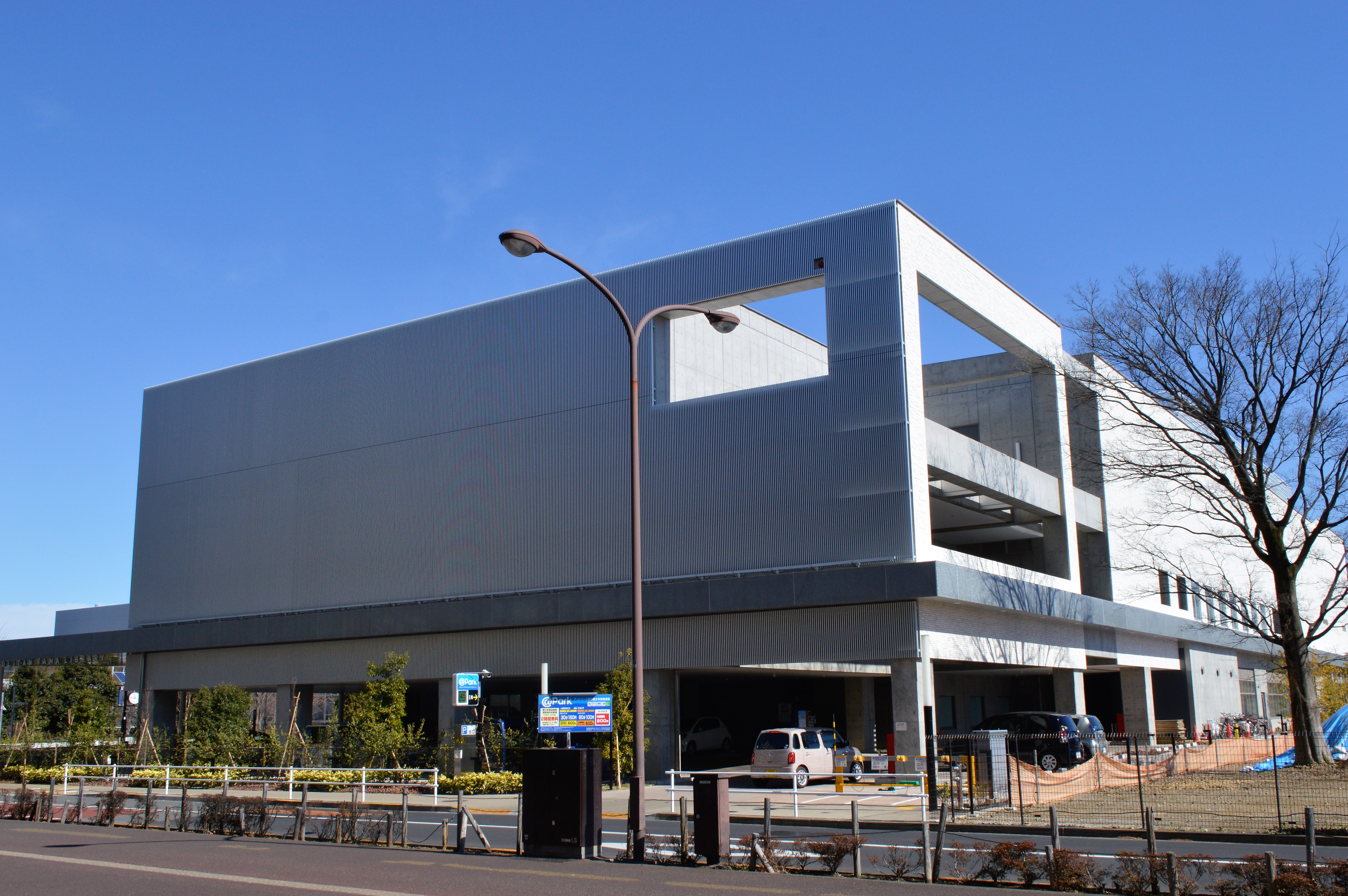
Tama Branch of the Tokyo Metropolitan Library

The Metropolitan Central Library is located in the Minami-Azabu section of Minato. The library was founded in 1973 at the current location of the central branch. The library is free and open to the public, although not all collections are available to all people at all times. The library also has arrangements with over 300 smaller local public libraries allowing interlibrary lending privileges. The Central Branch seats up to 900 people and provides access to wireless Wi-Fi and online databases.

The Hibiya Library was located in the Hibiya section of Chiyoda, prior to its closure.

The Tama Library is located in Tachikawa in Western Tokyo. The library opened in 1987 to relieve municipal libraries.

== Holdings ==
Although not as deep as the collection of the National Diet Library, which houses 44,187,016 items, The Tokyo Metropolitan Library houses a large collection of books, periodicals, and audio-visual materials.

The Central Branch holds 240,000 volumes, including a large collection of rare materials, showcasing over 40,000 documents pertaining to the history of Tokyo (Edo), some of which date back over 400 years. Books are divided by subject - Reference, Social Science, Humanities, Natural Science. Of note is the opening of a "regional history research center".

The Hibiya Branch holds 130,000 volumes, including 4,000 foreign volumes. It also maintains holdings of over 1,000 different magazine periodicals and nearly 200 different newspapers.

Total holdings (including volumes in storage) of the Metropolitan Library are estimated at 1,480,000 volumes.

== Locations and access ==
Central Branch: 5-7-13 Minami-Azabu Minato, 106–8575. It is located in the Arisugawa-no-miya Memorial Park. Accessible by foot from Hiroo Station on the Subway Hibiya Line, Azabu-Juban Station on the Subway Namboku Line, and the Azabu-Juban Station on the Toei Subway Oedo Line. (Coordinates: 35°39′7.5″N 139°43′34.8″E)

Hibiya Branch (Closed in 2009): 1-4 Hibiya Koen, Chiyoda, 100–0012. Accessible by foot from Kasumigaseki Station on the Subway Hibiya Line, Marunouchi Line, and Chiyoda Line, Shinbashi Station on the JR Yamanote Line, and Uchisaiwaichō Station on the Subway Mita Line.

Tama Branch: 6-3-1 Nishiki-cho, Tachikawa, 190–0022. Accessible by foot from Tachikawa Station on the JR Chūō Line and Nishi-Kunitachi Station on the JR Nambu line. (Coordinates: 35°41′20.4″N 139°25′8.5″E)

== See also ==
- List of Libraries in Japan
- Akita Prefectural Library
- National Diet Library
