= The History Museum of J-Koreans =

Korean history museum in Tokyo, Japan

- 在日韓人歴史資料館
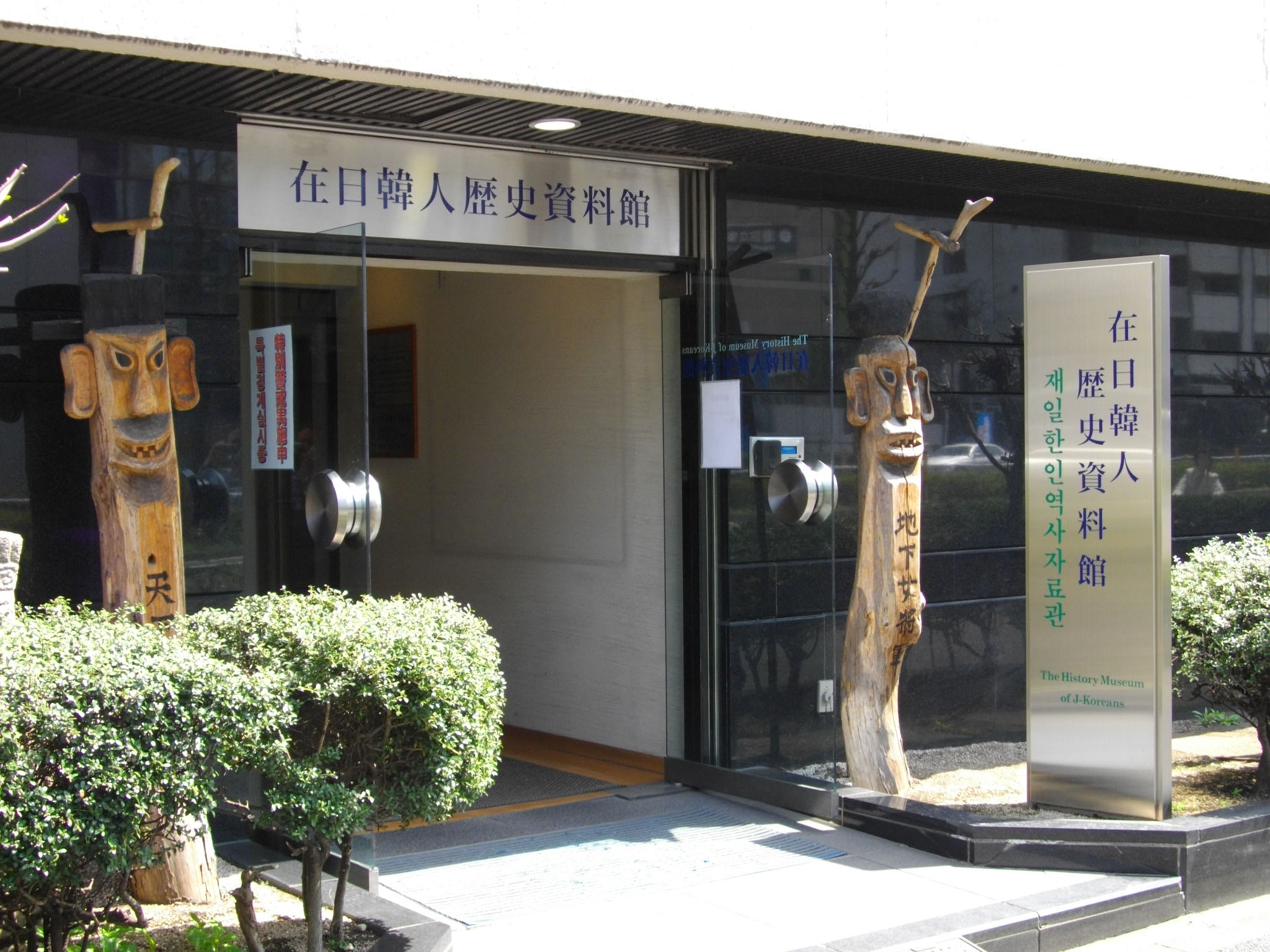
- Museum front entrance (2010)
- Established: November 24, 2005
- Location: 1-7-32, Minami-Azabu, Minato, Tokyo, Japan
- Coordinates: 35.65154°N 139.73703°E
- Public transit access: Azabu-juban Station, exit 2
- Website: www.j-koreans.org/en/ (in English)

The History Museum of J-Koreans (Japanese: 在日韓人歴史資料館; Korean: 재일한인역사자료관) is a museum covering the history of Koreans in Japan (especially Zainichi Koreans) located in Tokyo, Japan. The museum was established on November 24, 2005.

The museum covers both major historical events and the daily lives of Zainichi Koreans from the late Joseon period to the present day. It has a collection of over 70,000 artifacts, which it is digitalizing. The museum is relatively unknown to both the Korean and Japanese general publics, and had a total of 32,000 visitors from 2005 to 2015.

== Description ==
The museum has a number of permanent exhibits that cover a variety of topics. The time period it covers begins in the late Joseon period, when significant numbers of Koreans began moving to Japan, until the present.

The first exhibit covers the lives of Korean people in Japan before the liberation of Korea from Japanese colonial rule. It notably discusses the February 8 Declaration of Independence, in which Korean exchange students in Japan declared their intention to support the Korean independence movement. Other topics covered include the forced labor that Koreans were subjected to and the Kantō Massacre, in which Koreans were lynched based on false rumors. It also covers the history of systemic discrimination against Korean people under Japan. The second exhibit covers the experience after Korea's liberation. It notably covers the 1947 Alien Registration Ordinance, in which the Japanese government intentionally stripped ethnic Koreans that remained in Japan of their Japanese citizenship. This effectively denied them a number of benefits and legal rights. The exhibit also covers notable Zainichi Koreans. A third exhibition room covers the daily lives and careers of Zainichi Koreans throughout time.

The museum also hosts a number of special exhibits, as well as a number of temporary exhibits in other cities. One exhibit was even shown in the Seoul Museum of History in South Korea.

The museum also maintains an archive of physical and digital items. It has over 70,000 items in its collection. Among the items are books, popular media, newspaper articles, art, and more. Among the donated materials are documents from people who were accused of being B/C class war criminals after the conclusion of World War II. Some objects are more mundane, including clubs for the traditional Korean laundry process.

== History ==
Beginning in the 1980s, when the first generation of Korean people in Japan began to die, the Korean community in Japan began making efforts to preserve their history. The increasing amount of historical materials meant that a dedicated space was needed for their storage and preservation. In 1995, on the 50th anniversary of Korea's liberation, Park Gyeong-sik (박경식), a Japanese Korean historian, launched a campaign to create a museum, but it failed to gain traction.

A breakthrough came in 2002, when Mindan (also called the Korean Residents Union in Japan) pledged financial support for the museum. They hoped to open the museum by the 60th anniversary of the liberation, in 2005. This movement succeeded, and resulted in The History Museum of J-Koreans opening on November 24, 2005.

=== Naming debate ===
One subject of discussion was what name to use for Korean people. The term 韓; Han is used in the official name for South Korea and in the names of a number of historical Korean states. The term Joseon ("Chōsen" in Japanese) is used in the official name for North Korea and also by a number of historical states.

The term Han is not used much outside of South Korea. However, Mindan is notably a South Korea-aligned organization (by contrast, Chongryon is North Korea-aligned); the museum eventually used the South Korea-aligned term Han in its name.

=== Recent history ===
Despite its efforts to appeal to South Korean visitors, the museum is relatively unknown to both them and to the general Japanese public. From the museum's opening until the end of 2015, it saw a total of 32,000 visitors. Around half of the visitors are Korean, and the other half are Japanese. Beginning in 2021, the museum began efforts to digitize and organize its entire collection. The effort was expected to last until the end of 2022.

== See also ==
- Museum of Japanese Colonial History in Korea – museum in Seoul, South Korea
- Ōkubo, Tokyo – Tokyo's Koreatown
