= Roppongi Station =

Metro station in Tokyo, Japan

Coordinates: 35°39′46″N 139°43′53″E

Roppongi Station 六本木駅

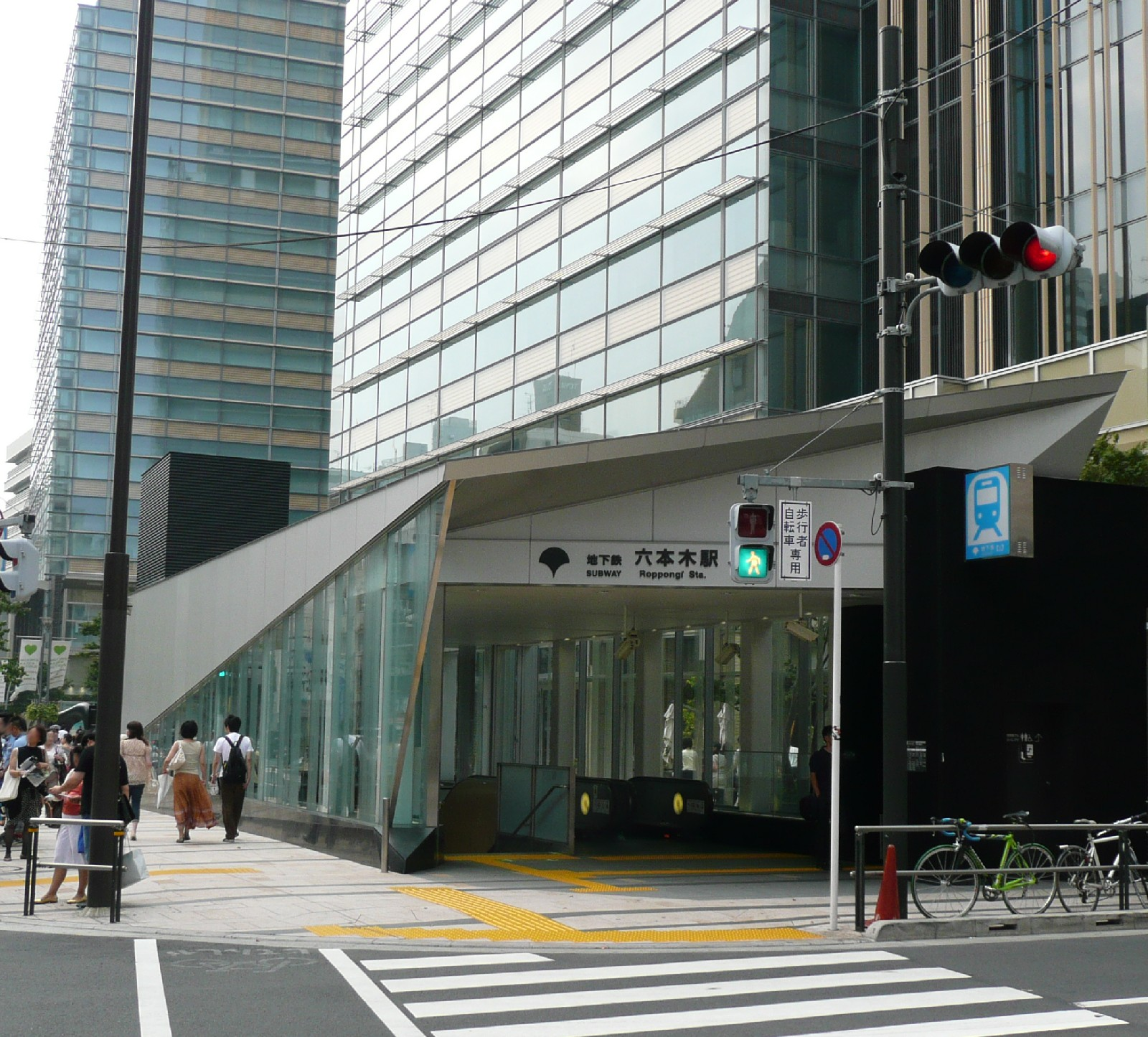
- Exit No. 7 in July 2008

General information
- Location: Roppongi 6-1-25 (Tokyo Metro), 7-39 Akasaka 9-chome (Toei), Minato, Tokyo; Japan
- System: Tokyo subway
- Owner: Tokyo Metro Co., Ltd. Tokyo Metropolitan Government
- Operator: Tokyo Metro; Toei Subway
- Lines: Hibiya Line; Ōedo Line
- Platforms: 4 island platforms (2 for each line)
- Tracks: 4 (2 for each line)

Construction
- Structure type: Underground

Other information
- Station code: H-04, E-23

History
- Opened: 25 March 1964; 62 years ago

Passengers
- FY2019: 133,164 daily (Tokyo Metro); 98,539 daily (Toei Subway)

Services
| Preceding station | Tokyo Metro | Following station |
|---|---|---|
| Hiroo towards Ebisu | TH Liner | Kamiyachō One-way operation |
| Hiroo towards Naka-meguro | Hibiya Line | Kamiyachō towards Kita-Senju |
| Preceding station | Toei Subway | Following station |
| Aoyama-itchōme towards Hikarigaoka | Ōedo Line | Azabu-juban towards Tochōmae |
Location
- Location within Tokyo Yamanote Loop Location within Tokyo wards area Location within Japan

Roppongi Station (六本木駅, Roppongi-eki) is a subway station in Minato, Tokyo, Japan, operated jointly by Tokyo Metro and Toei Subway.

== Lines ==
- Tokyo Metro Hibiya Line (H-04)
- Toei Oedo Line (E-23)

It is also relatively close to Roppongi-itchōme Station on the Tokyo Metro Namboku Line (located 800 meters to the northeast), although it is not officially recognized as a transfer station and there is no transfer corridor between the two stations.

== Station layout ==
The Toei Oedo Line platform 1 is 42 meters underground, making this station the deepest of the Tokyo subway stations. (The Toei Oedo Line platform 2 is 32 meters underground.)

=== Tokyo Metro ===
Two side platforms serving two tracks.

| 1 | Hibiya Line | for Naka-Meguro |
| 2 | Hibiya Line | for Ginza, Ueno, and Kita-senju; Tobu Skytree Line for Tōbu-Dōbutsu-Kōen; Tobu Nikko Line for Minami-Kurihashi |

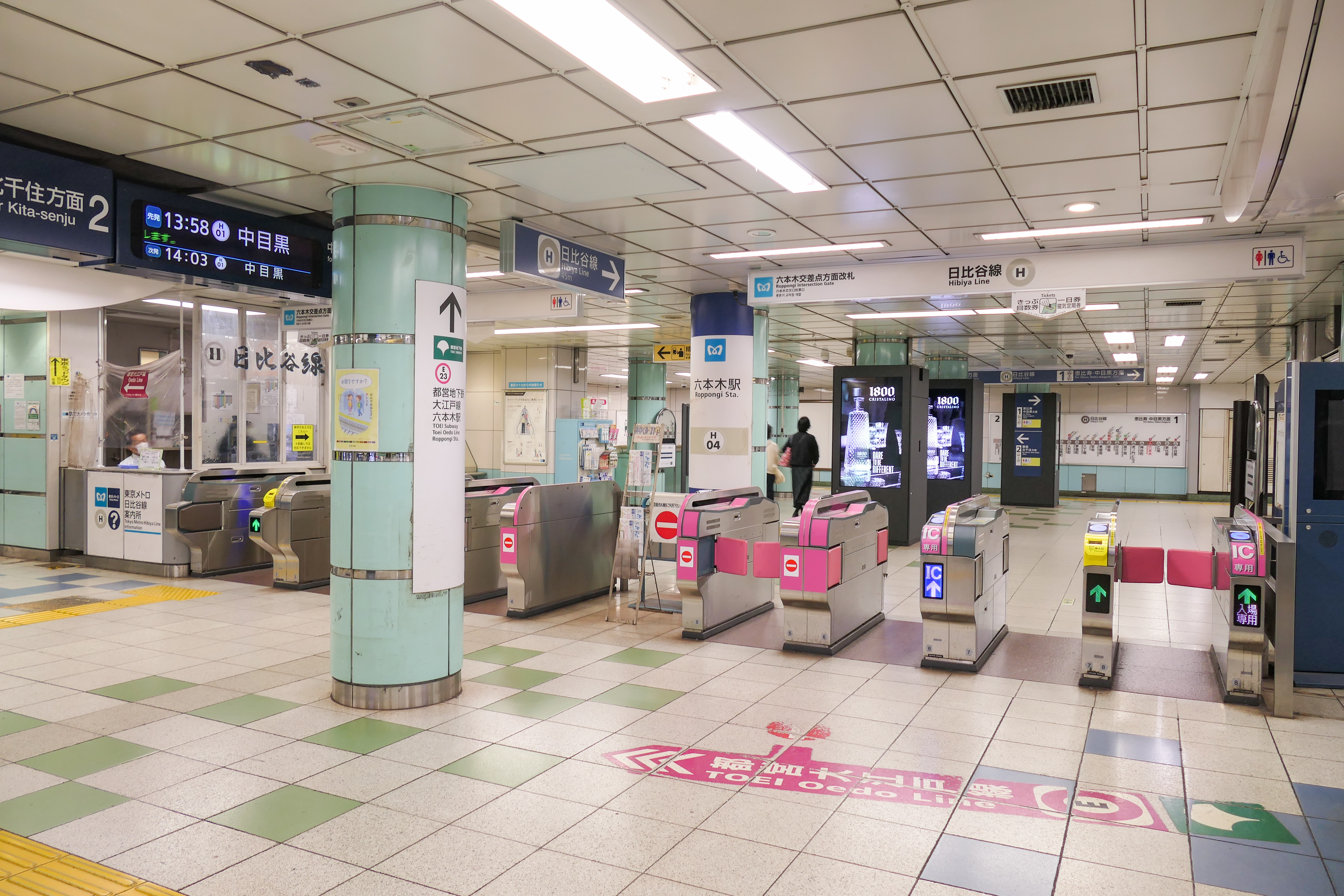
Hibiya Line concourse in November 2022

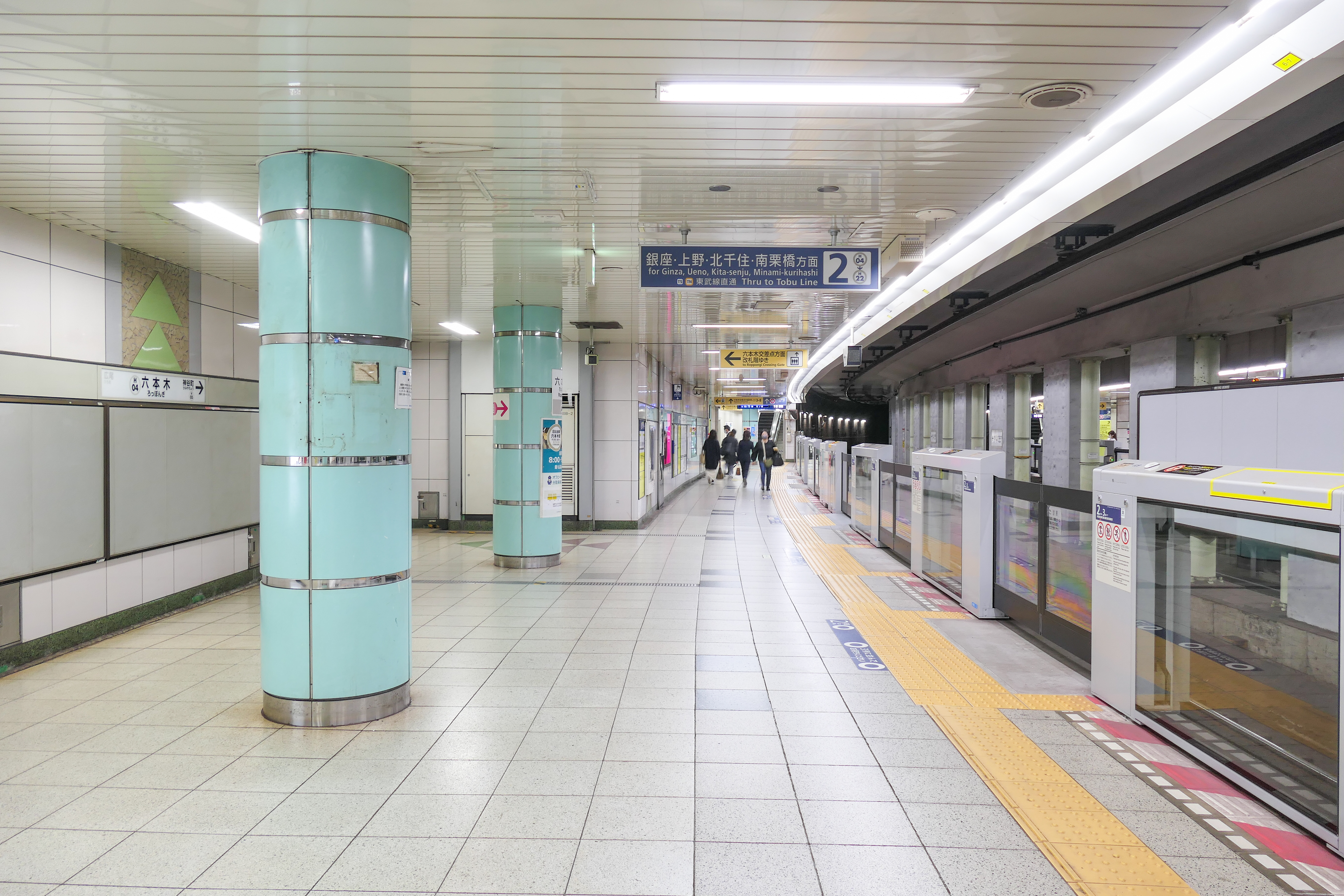
Hibiya Line platforms in November 2022

=== Toei ===
Two side platforms serving two tracks. Platform 1 is located on the 7th basement level, and platform 2 is located on the 5th basement level.

| 1 | Ōedo Line | for Daimon and Ryōgoku |
| 2 | Ōedo Line | for Tochōmae and Hikarigaoka |

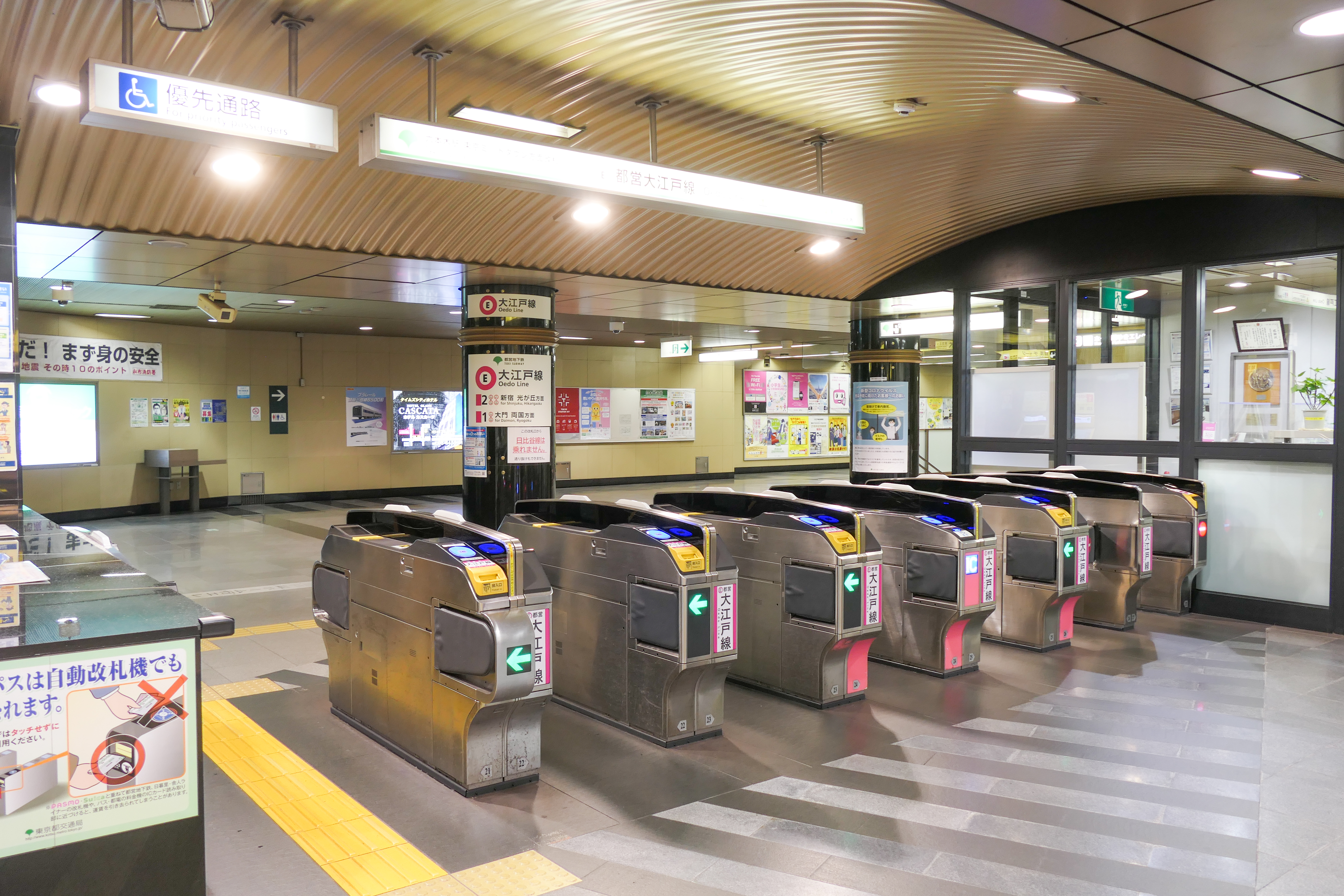
Oedo Line concourse in May 2022

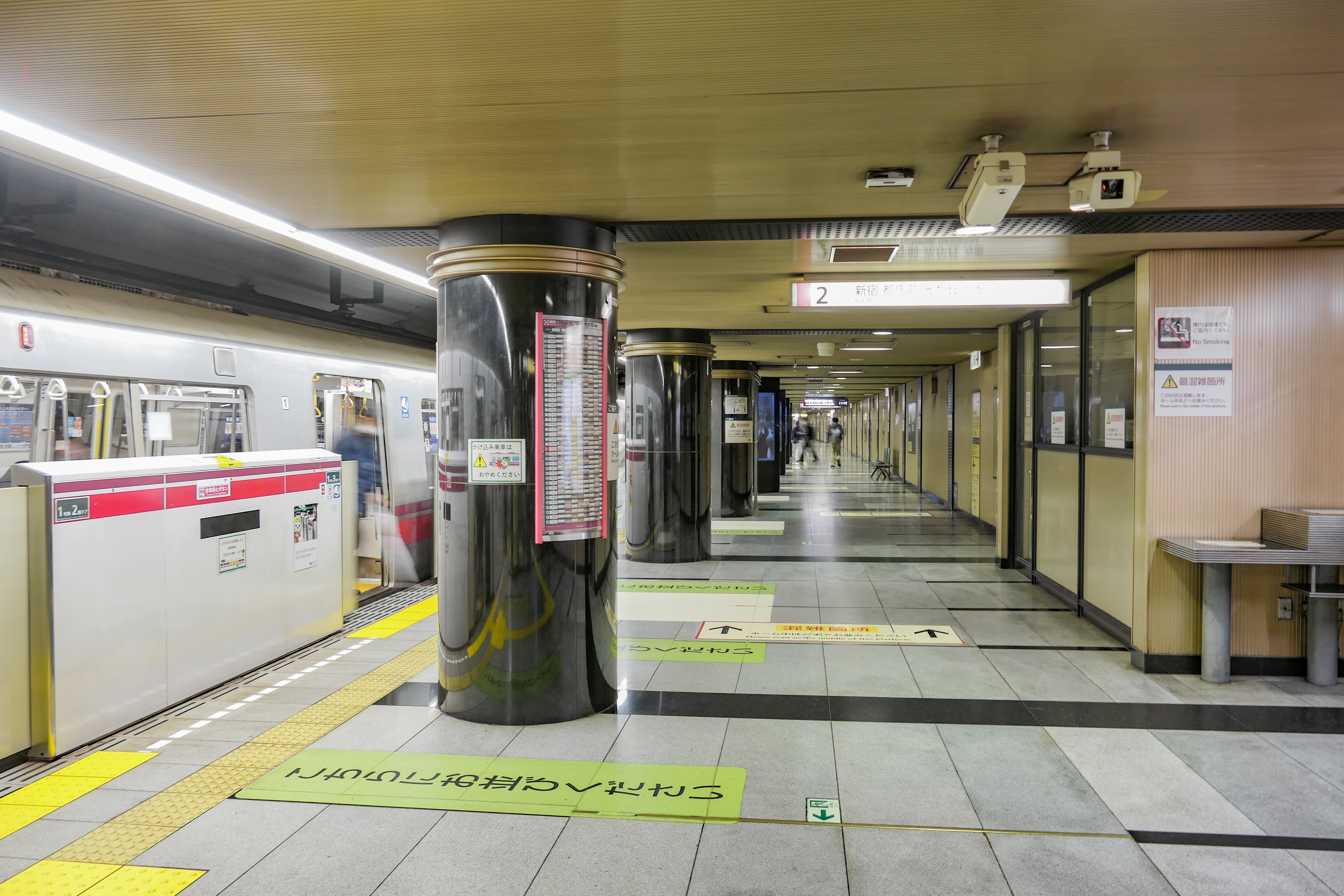
Oedo Line platform in May 2022

== History ==
The Hibiya Line station opened on March 25, 1964. The Oedo Line station opened on December 12, 2000.

The station facilities of the Hibiya Line were inherited by Tokyo Metro after the privatization of the Teito Rapid Transit Authority (TRTA) in 2004.

== Surrounding area ==
- Roppongi
- Roppongi Hills (TV Asahi, etc.)
- Tokyo Midtown
- The National Art Center, Tokyo
- the National Graduate Institute for Policy Studies
- Akasaka Press Center
  - Stars and Stripes

== See also ==
- List of railway stations in Japan
