= Arisugawa-no-miya Memorial Park =

Park in Tokyo, Japan

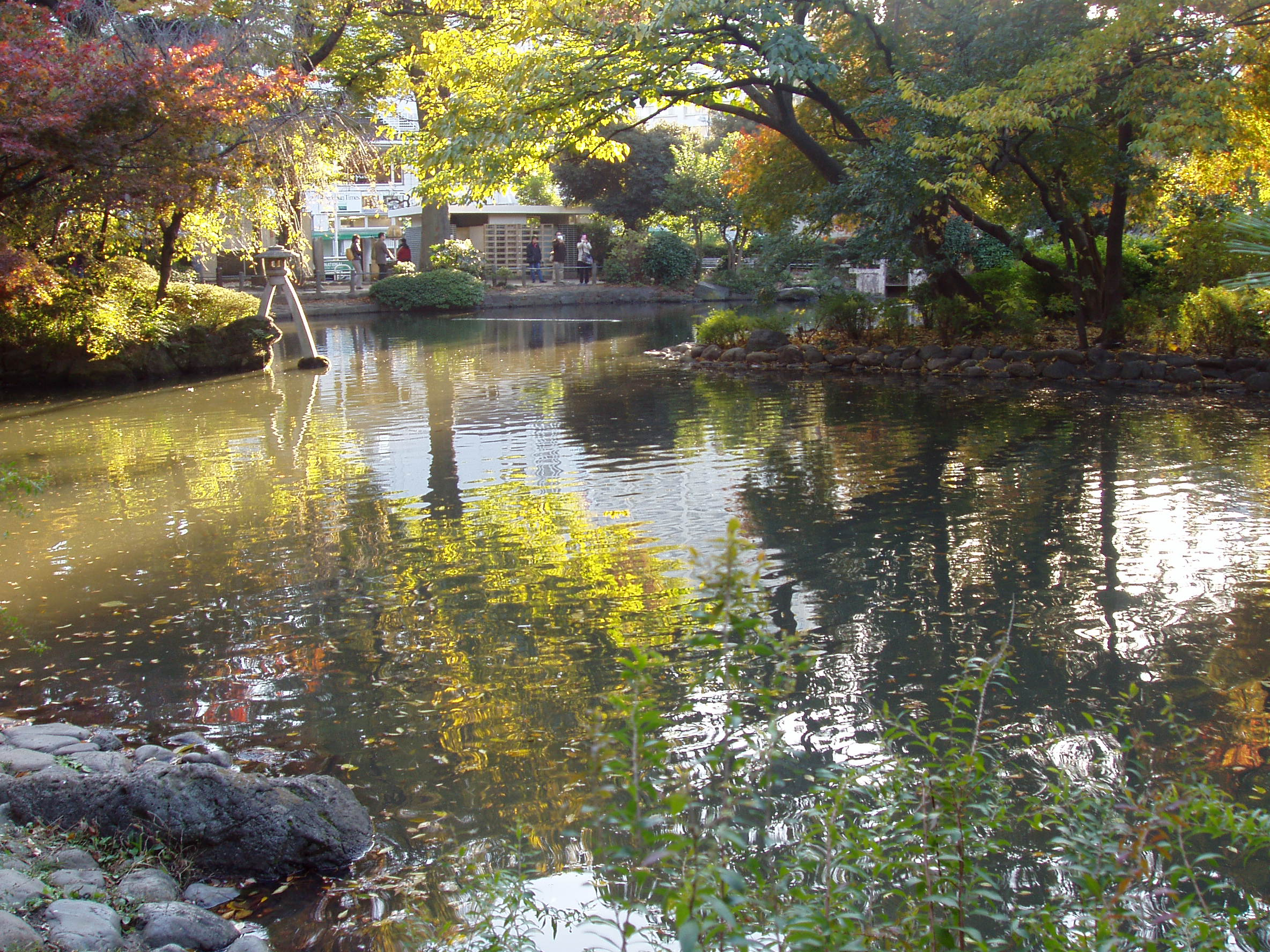
- In November 2007
- Interactive map of Arisugawa-no-miya Memorial Park
- Location: Minato Ward, Tokyo, Japan
- Coordinates: 35.652024°N 139.725795°E
- Area: 67,131 square metres (16.588 acres)
- Created: November 1934
- Public transit: Hiroo Station

Arisugawa-no-miya Memorial Park (有栖川宮記念公園, Arisugawa no Miya Kinen Kōen) is a park located in Minami-Azabu, Minato, Tokyo, Japan. It covers an area of 67,131 square metres.

== History ==
During the Edo period, the park belonged to Minonokami Nambu, a feudal lord from the former Morioka Domain who used it as an urban villa. In 1896, it was acquired by the Arisugawa-no-miya line of the Imperial family, and then in 1913 it was passed on to the Prince Takamatsu line. Out of a great personal interest in promoting children's health and education about nature, Prince Takamatsu donated 36,325 square metres of land to Tokyo for use as a park on January 5, 1934, the anniversary of the death of Prince Arisugawa Taruhito. The city immediately began construction and the Arisugawa-no-miya Memorial Park was opened on November 17, 1934. After having expanded to include Azabu Baseball Field and tennis courts, the park's total area is currently 67,131 square metres. In 1975, administration for the park was given over to Minato ward where it remains today.

== Features ==
The park is built into a hill so it has several tiers. The park's cascading hills and valleys, ponds, and densely wooded areas have been arranged in harmony with the natural terrain. There is a heavily wooded area at the bottom with streams, waterfalls, bridges and ponds. On a tier above, there is a large plaza with an adjacent children's playground. The plaza is dominated by an equestrian statue of Prince Arisugawa Taruhito. There are also the little statues of the Newspaper Delivery Boy and the Youth Playing a Flute. On the other side of the plaza is the Tokyo Metropolitan Central Library.

Rising above the landscape is a golden trumpet-blowing angel at the top of the spire of the Tokyo Temple of the Church of Jesus Christ of Latter-Day Saints across the road, adding another aspect to many of the landscapes available within the park.

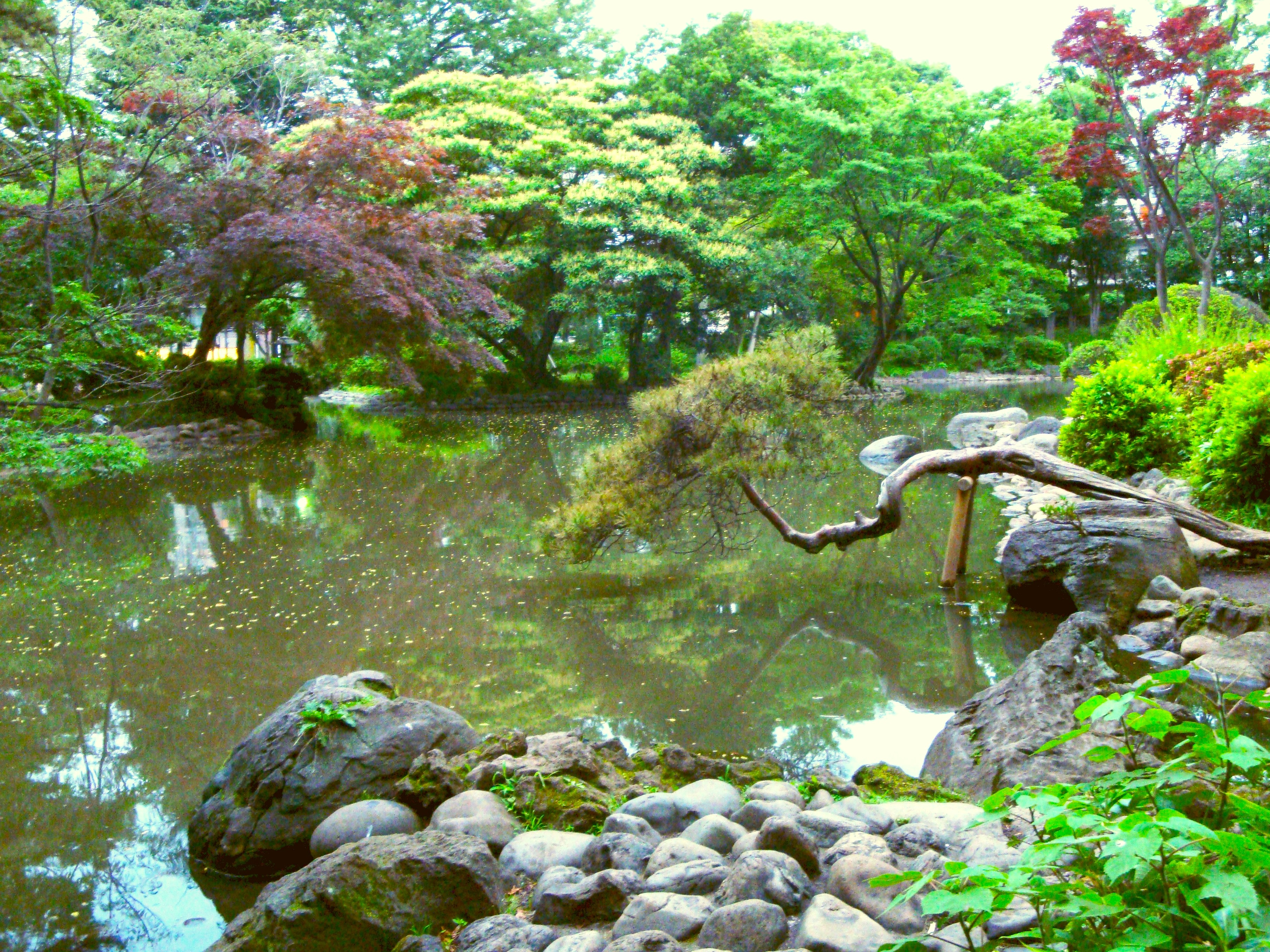
Pond of Arisugawa-no-miya Memorial Park

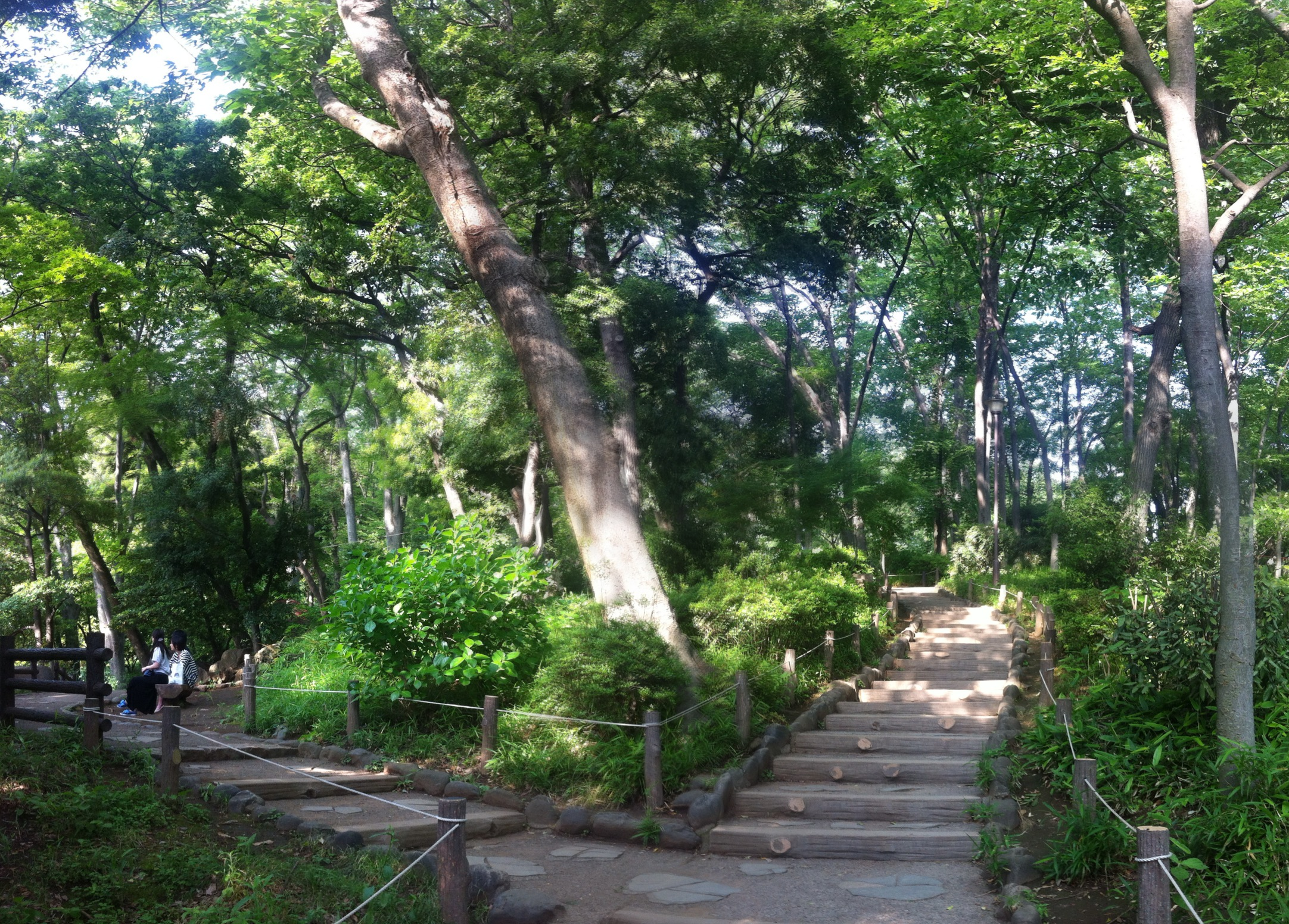
The hills behind the pond

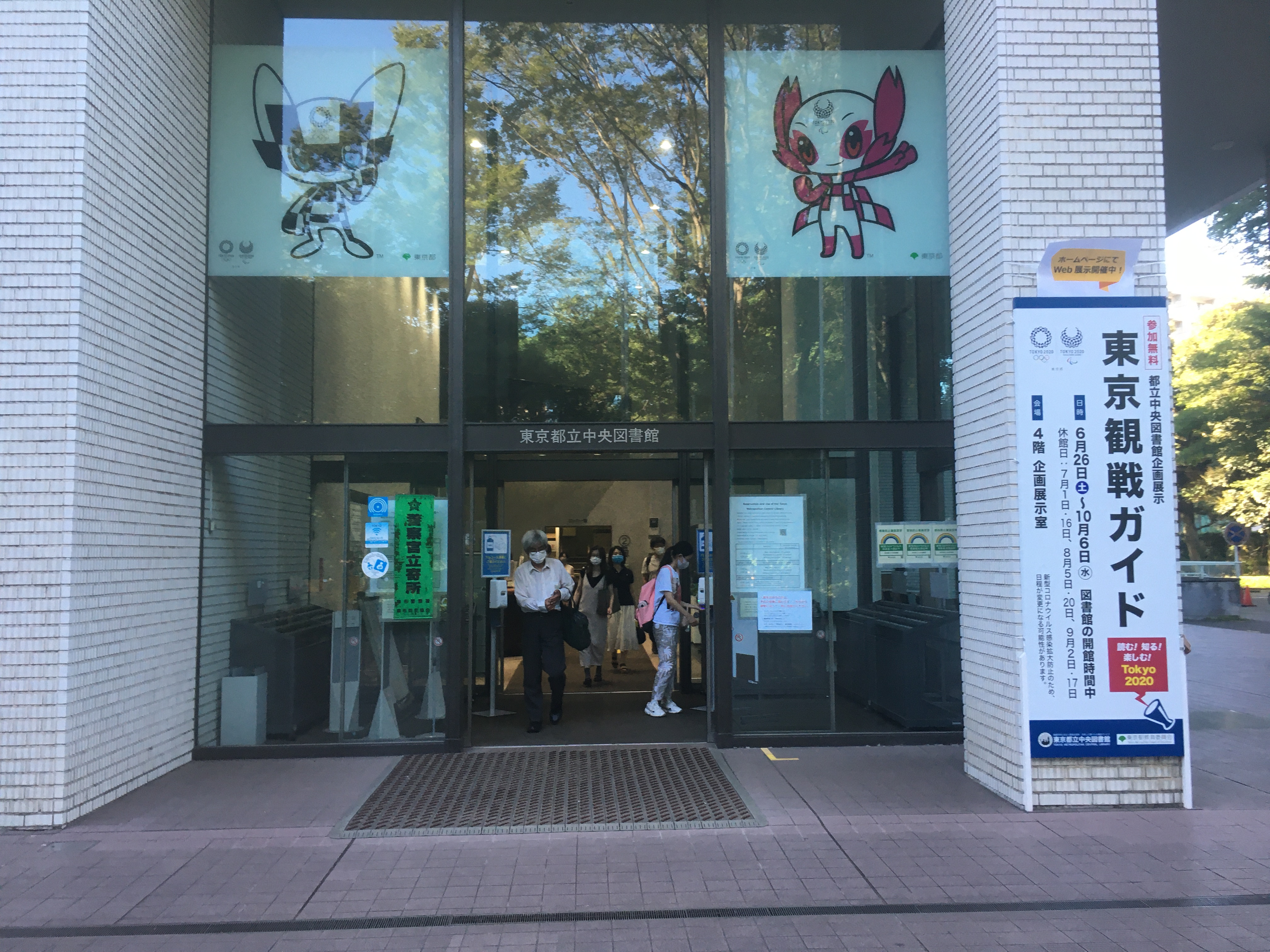
Tokyo Metropolitan Central Library

Summer in Arisugawa-no-miya Memorial Park, 2021

== Location ==
The park is located approximately 2 minutes' walk from Hiroo Station and is adjacent to various buildings such as the Aiiku hospital to the north, the National Azabu grocery store to the south, and the German Embassy neighboring National Azabu.
