= Hiroo Station =

Metro station in Tokyo, Japan

Hiroo Station 広尾駅

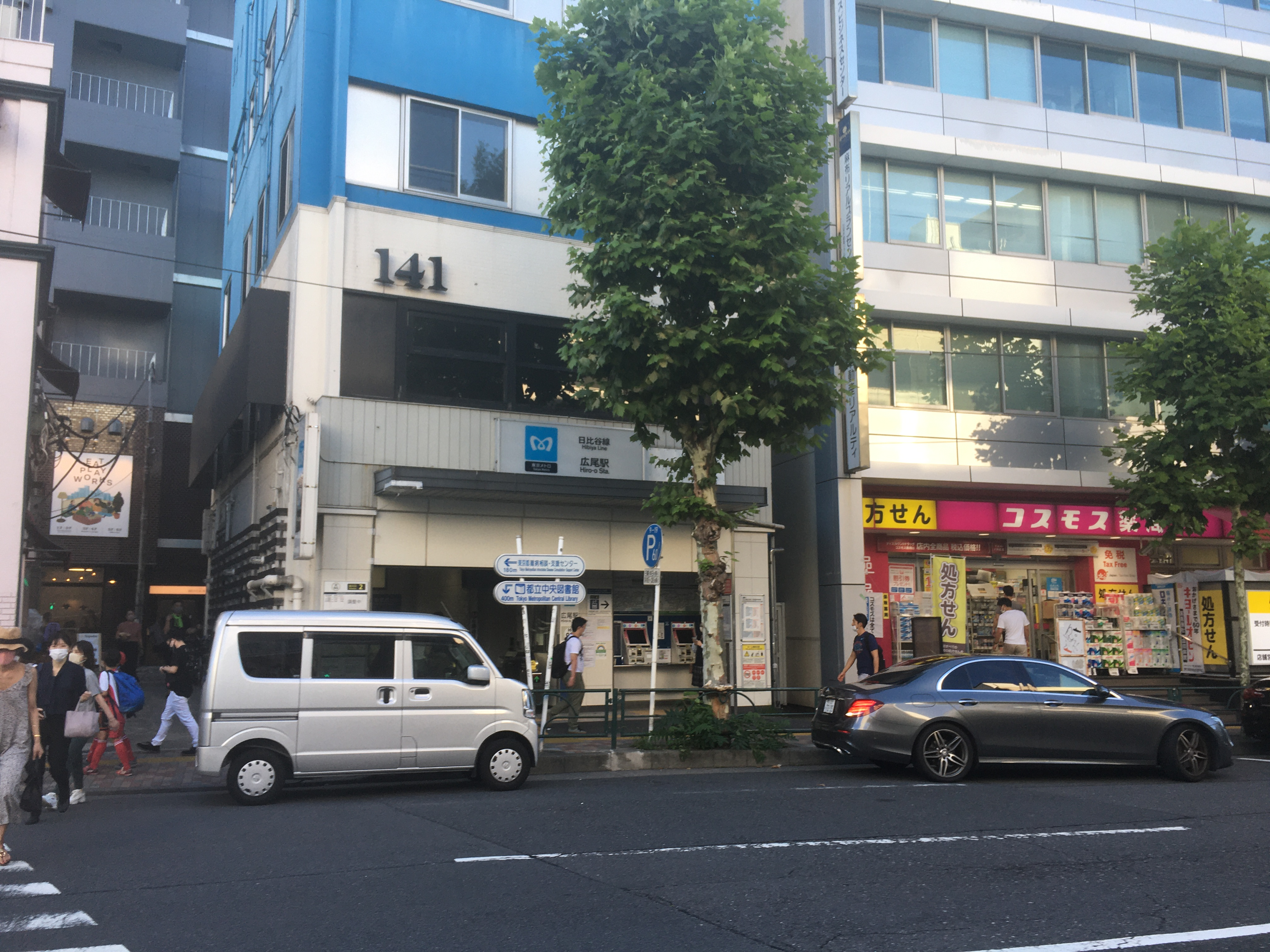
- Hiroo station entrance 2 in 2021

Japanese name
- Shinjitai: 広尾駅
- Kyūjitai: 廣尾驛
- Hiragana: ひろおえき

General information
- Location: 5-1-25 Minami-Azabu District, Minato City, Tokyo; Japan
- Coordinates: 35.652188°N 139.722227°E
- Operator: Tokyo Metro
- Line: Hibiya Line
- Distance: 17.8 km (11.1 mi) from Kita-Senju
- Platforms: 2 side platforms
- Tracks: 2

Construction
- Structure type: Underground

Other information
- Station code: H03
- Website: Official website (in English)

History
- Opened: 25 March 1964; 62 years ago

Passengers
- FY2019: 62,588 daily

Services
Preceding station	Tokyo Metro	Following station
Ebisu Terminus	TH Liner	Roppongi One-way operation
Ebisu towards Naka-meguro	Hibiya Line	Roppongi towards Kita-Senju
Location
- Location within Tokyo Yamanote Loop Location within Tokyo wards area Location within Japan

Hiroo Station (広尾駅, Hiroo-eki) (officially Hiro-o Station) is a subway station on the Hibiya Line in Minato, Tokyo operated by the Tokyo subway operator Tokyo Metro. The station is named after the adjacent Hiroo neighborhood in Shibuya ward, though the station is entirely located in Minami-Azabu.

== Lines ==
Hiroo Station is served by the Tokyo Metro Hibiya Line from Kita-Senju to Naka-Meguro, with through-running services to and from the Tobu Skytree Line in the north. The station is numbered "H03", and is 17.8 km from the northern end of the line at Kita-Senju.

== Station layout ==
The underground station consists of two opposed side platforms serving two tracks.

=== Platforms ===
1	Hibiya Line	for Ebisu and Naka-meguro
2	Hibiya Line	for Roppongi, Ginza, Ueno, and Kita-senju; Tobu Skytree Line for Tōbu-Dōbutsu-Kōen; Tobu Nikko Line for Minami-Kurihashi

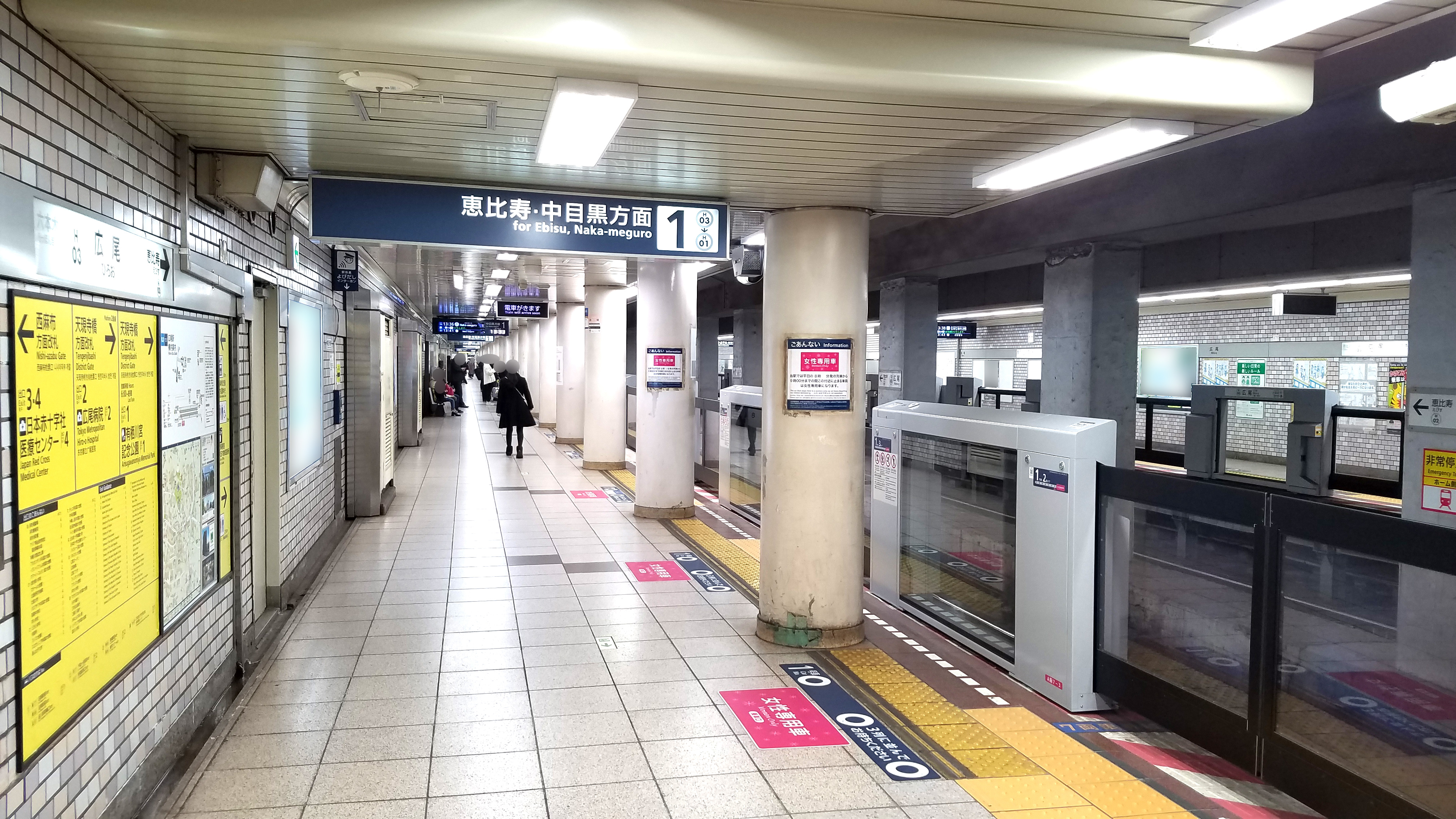
Platform, looking towards Kita-Senju, on 28 February 2022

=== Exits ===
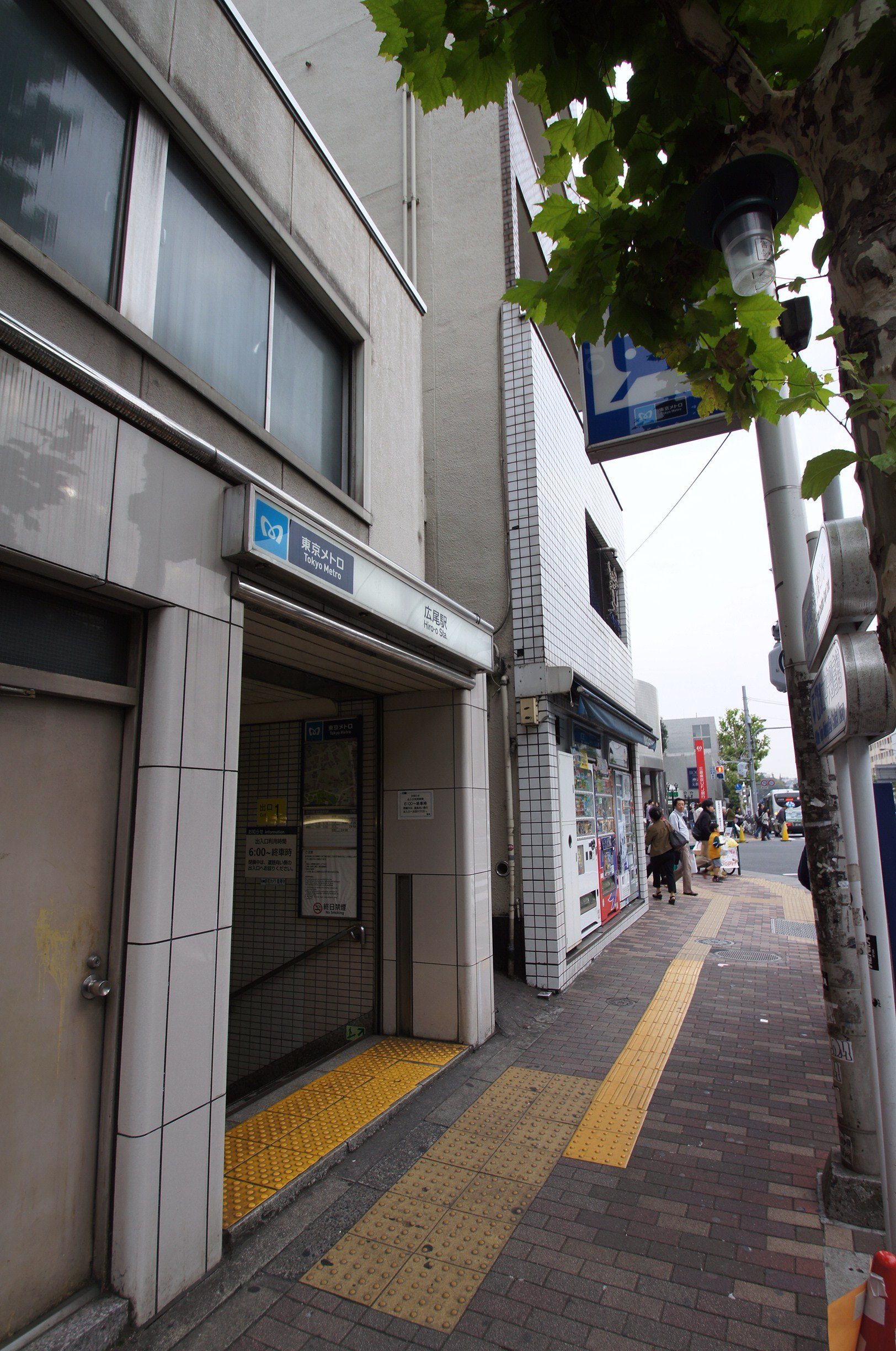
Exit 1 in November 2011

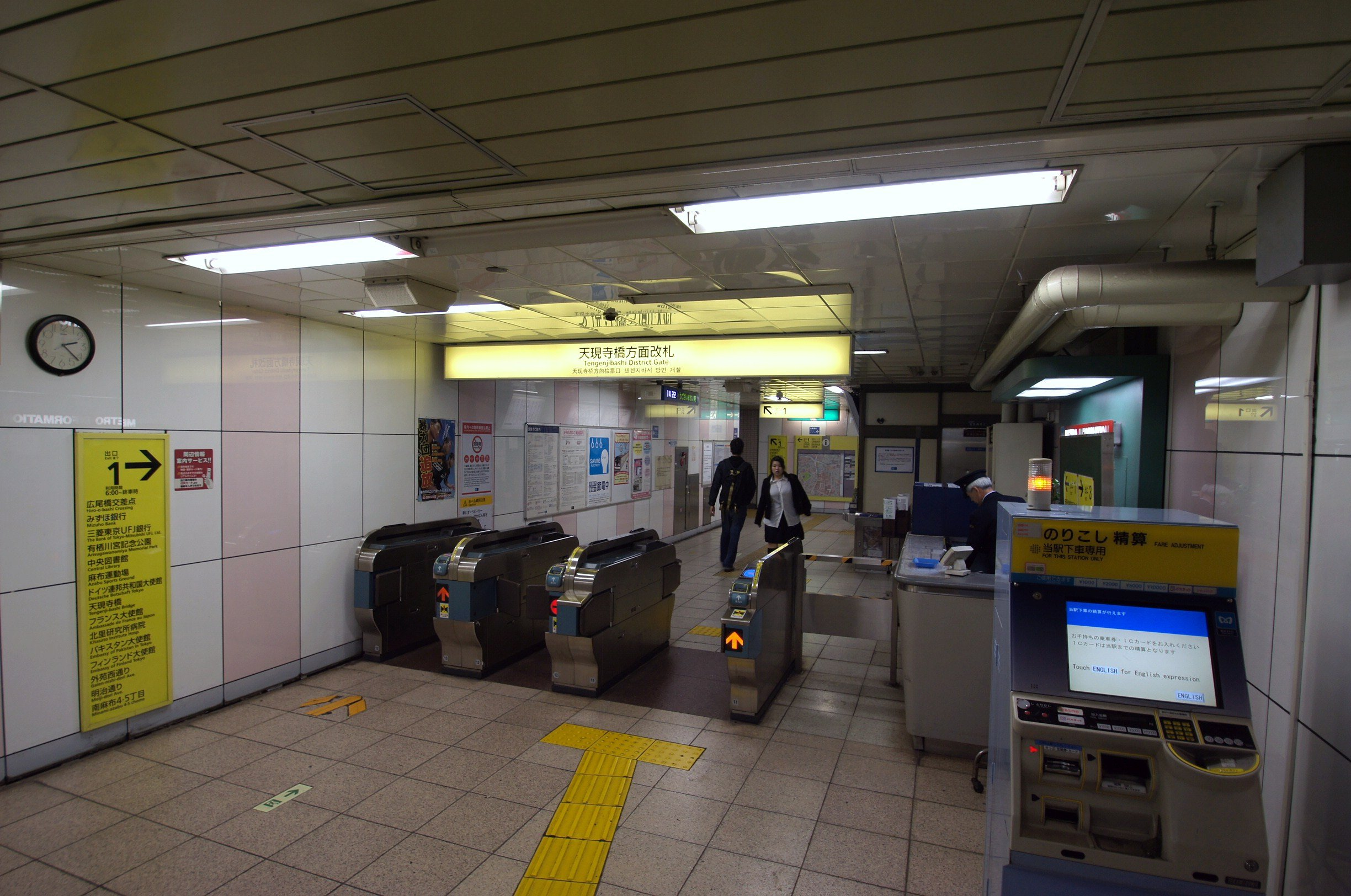
The ticket barriers for Exit 1 in November 2011

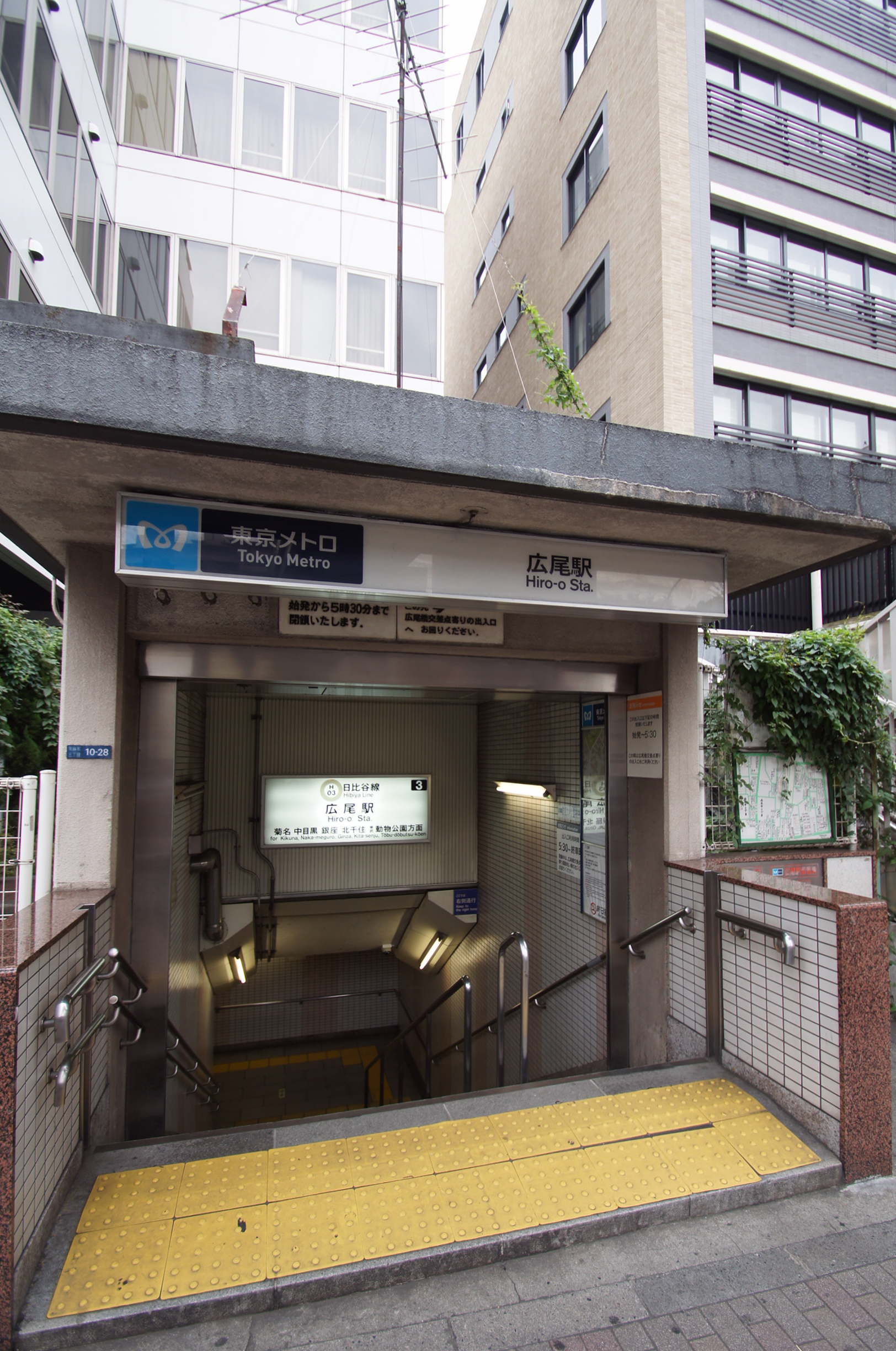
Exit 3 in November 2011

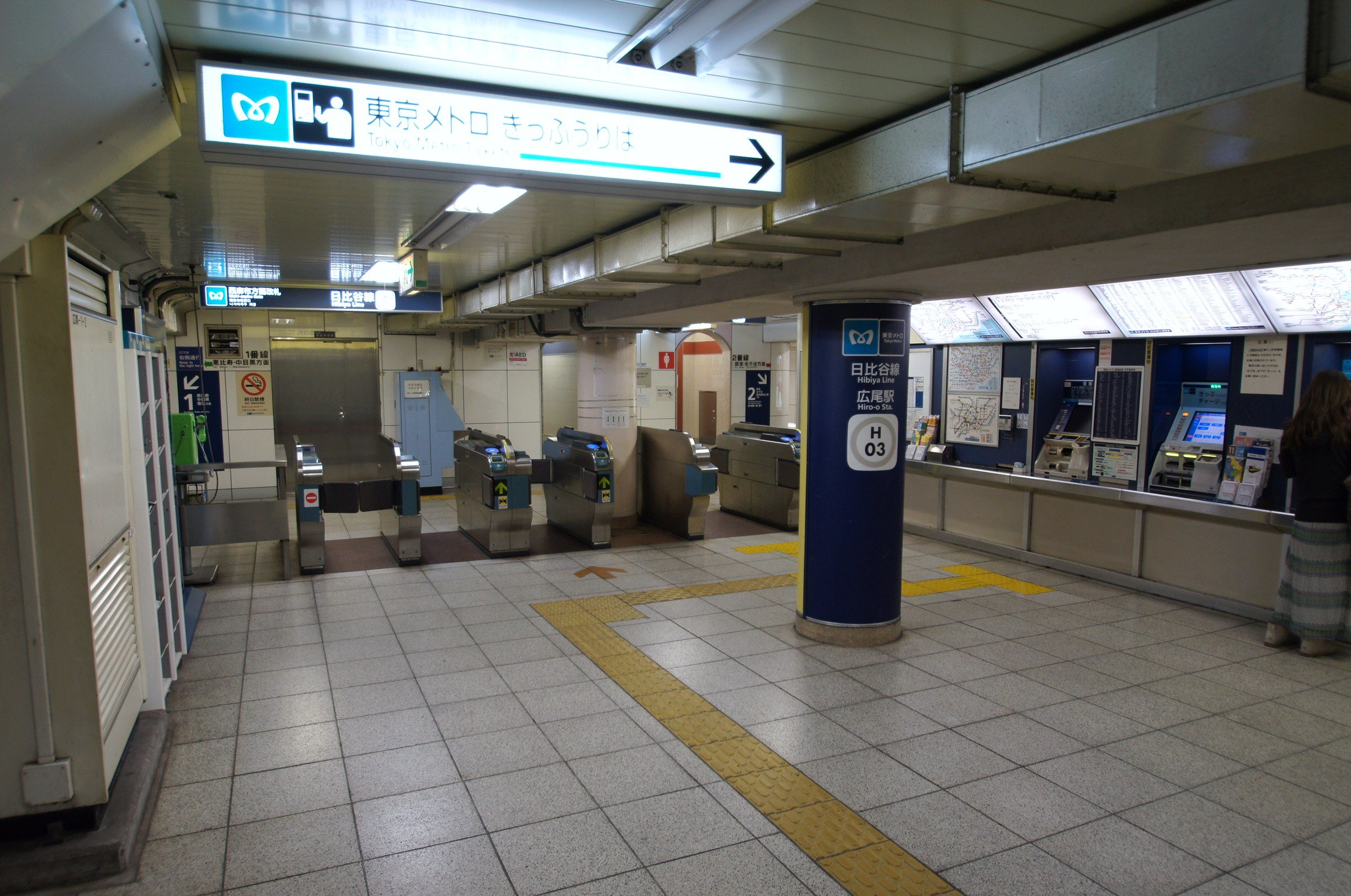
The ticket barriers for Exit 3 in November 2011

The station has four exits, numbered 1 to 4. Exit 1 is convenient for visitors to the Arisugawa-no-miya Memorial Park, the Tokyo Metropolitan Library, and the Kitazato Research Hospital. Exit 2 serves those going to the Hiroo shopping arcade, University of the Sacred Heart or the Tokyo Metropolitan Hiroo Hospital. Exit 3 is near the Minato word Kōgai Elementary School. Exit 4 newly opened in April 2016. It is closest to the International School of the Sacred Heart, Hiroo Gakuen Junior & Senior High School, Japan Red CrossNursing College or Medical Center and the Minato Ward Kōryō Junior High School. Both Exit 3 and 4 are closest to the Nishi-Azabu, Minami-Aoyama district.

== History ==
The station was opened on 25 March 1964 by the Teito Rapid Transit Authority (TRTA).

The station facilities were inherited by Tokyo Metro after the privatization of the TRTA in 2004.

== Passenger statistics ==
In fiscal 2019, the station was used by an average of 62,588 passengers daily. The passenger figures for previous years are as shown below.

Fiscal year	Daily average
2011	55,448
2012	56,244
2013	57,947
2014	58,864
2015	60,333
2016	61,620
2017	63,049
2018	63,171
2019	62,588

== Surrounding area ==
Hiroo is an expensive, overpriced residential area in eastern Shibuya, close to Minato ward in Tokyo. Hiroo is within walking distance of the infamous nightlife district Roppongi, and several shopping and dining areas including Ebisu, Azabu Juban, and Daikanyama.

Hiroo is home to a number of embassies and international schools. The German Embassy is a short walk from the station. Hiroo is home to Meidiya and National Azabu supermarkets, offering upscale groceries and foreign products.

The Hiroo Shopping street offers a mix of traditional Japanese craft stores and modern boutiques. The Mormon Tokyo Japan Temple is close to Hiroo Station, as is Arisugawa-no-miya Memorial Park. Tokyo Metropolitan Library is located in Arisugawa-no-miya Memorial Park.
