= Minami-Azabu =

Minami-Azabu 南麻布
- District
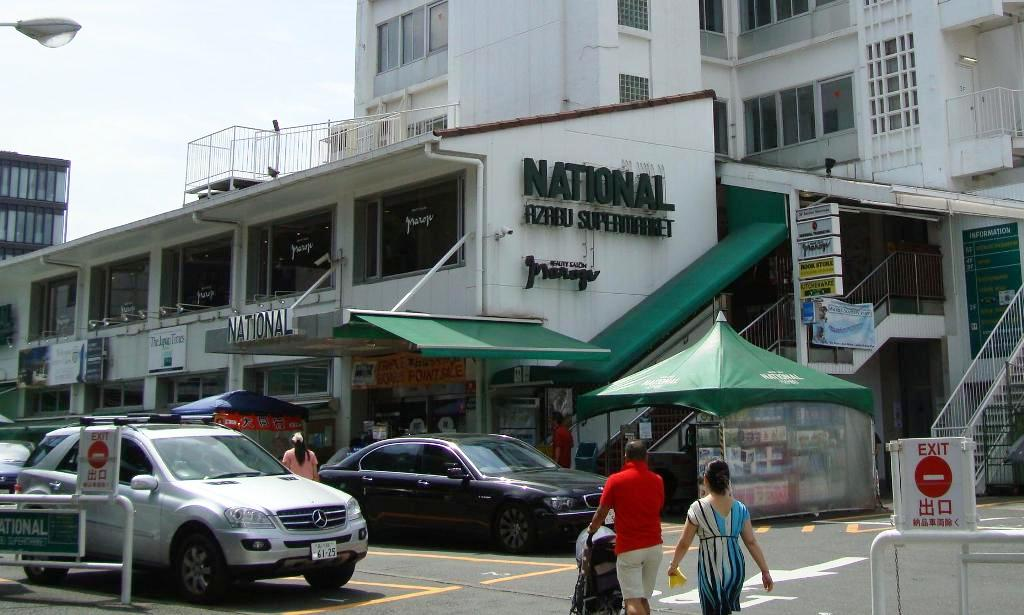
- National Azabu Supermarket
- Interactive map of Minami-Azabu
- Coordinates: 35.650719°N 139.730617°E
- Country: Japan
- City: Tokyo
- Ward: Minato
- Area: Azabu Area

Population (January 1, 2016)
  - Total: 15,974
- Time zone: UTC+9 (JST)
- Postal code: 106-0047
- Area code: 03

Minami-Azabu (南麻布) is a district of Minato, Tokyo, Japan. Literally meaning "Southern Azabu", Minami-Azabu was named so because it was situated in the southern portion of the former Azabu Ward.

The area's postal code is 106–0047.

== Landmarks ==
- Arisugawa-no-miya Memorial Park
- Embassy of the Republic of Korea in Japan
- The History Museum of J-Koreans
- Tokyo Metropolitan Central Library
- Mindan
- Temple University Japan Campus

== Education ==
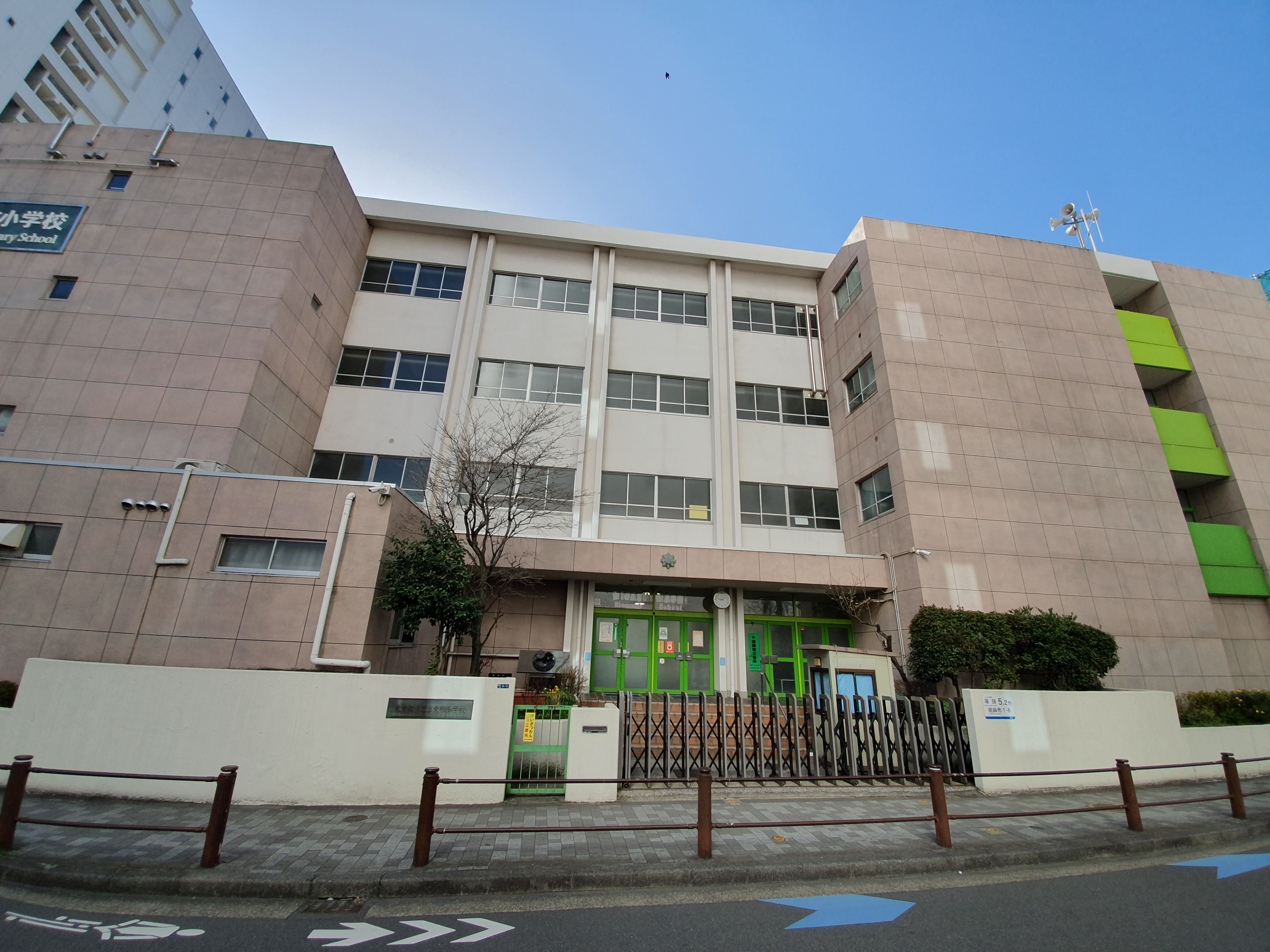
Higashimachi Elementary School (東町小学校) in Minami Azabu

Minato City Board of Education operates public elementary and junior high schools.

Minami-Azabu 1-chōme 1-2 and 25-27 ban, 2-chōme 1, 9, and 14-ban, 3-chōme 1-21 ban, and 4-chōme 1-12 ban are zoned to Hommura (or Honmura) Elementary School (本村小学校) Minami-Azabu 5-chōme is zoned to Kōgai Elementary School (笄小学校). Minami-Azabu 1-chōme 3-24 ban, and 2-chōme 2-8 and 10-13 ban are zoned to Higashimachi Elementary School (東町小学校). The Hommura and Kōgai elementary zones feed into Kōryō Junior High School (高陵中学校). The Higashimachi zone feeds into Roppongi Junior High School (六本木中学校). Minami-Azabu 2-chōme 15-ban, 3-chōme 22-ban, and 4-chōme 13-15 ban are zoned to Shirokane-no-Oka Gakuen (白金の丘学園) for elementary and junior high school.

Private schools:

- Tokyo International School
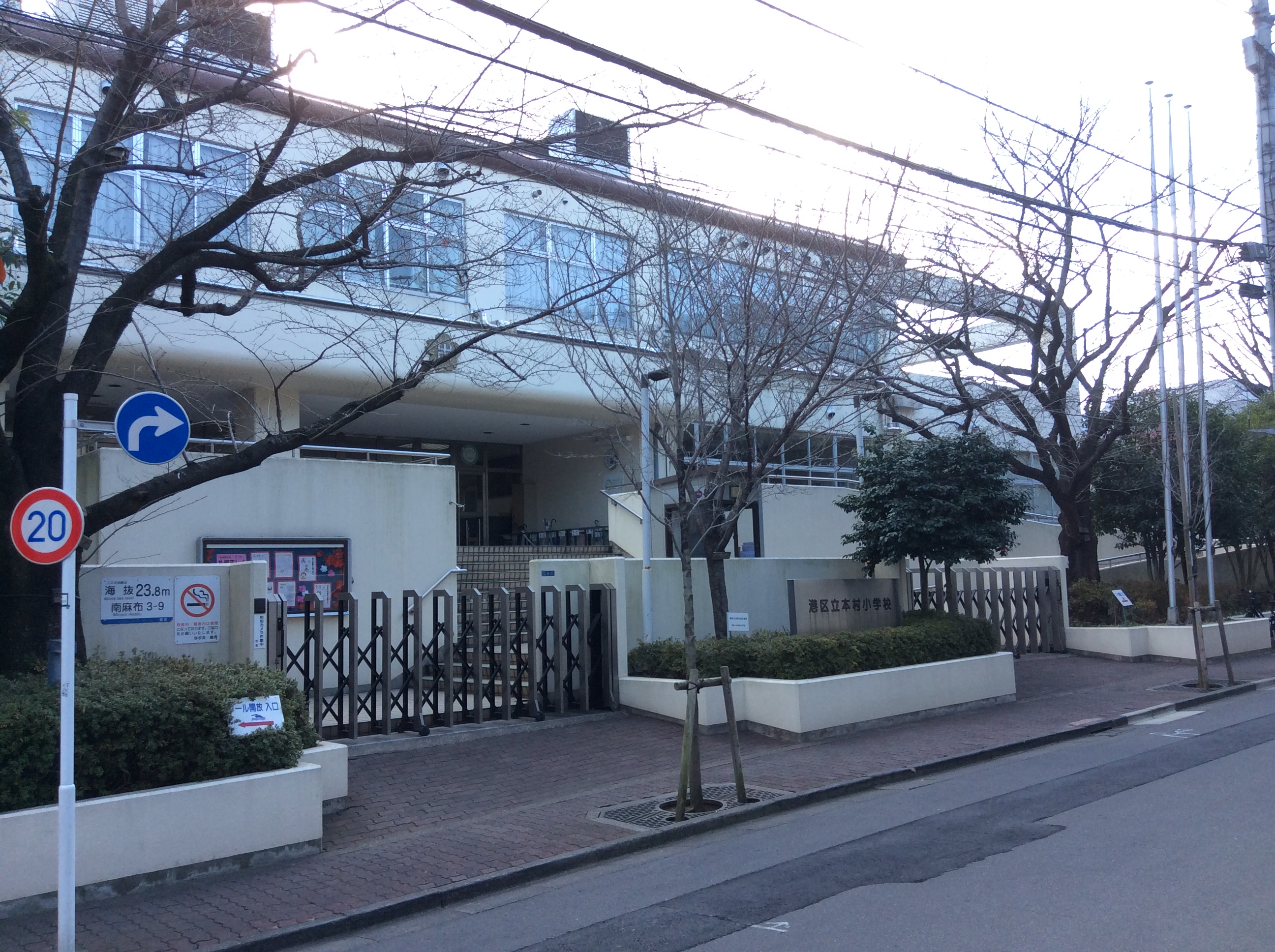
Hommura (or Honmura) Elementary School (本村小学校) in Minami Azabu

== Subway stations ==
- Hiroo Station
- Azabu-Jūban Station
- Shirokane-Takanawa Station
