= Ebisu Station (Tokyo) =

Railway and metro station in Tokyo, Japan

Ebisu Station 恵比寿駅
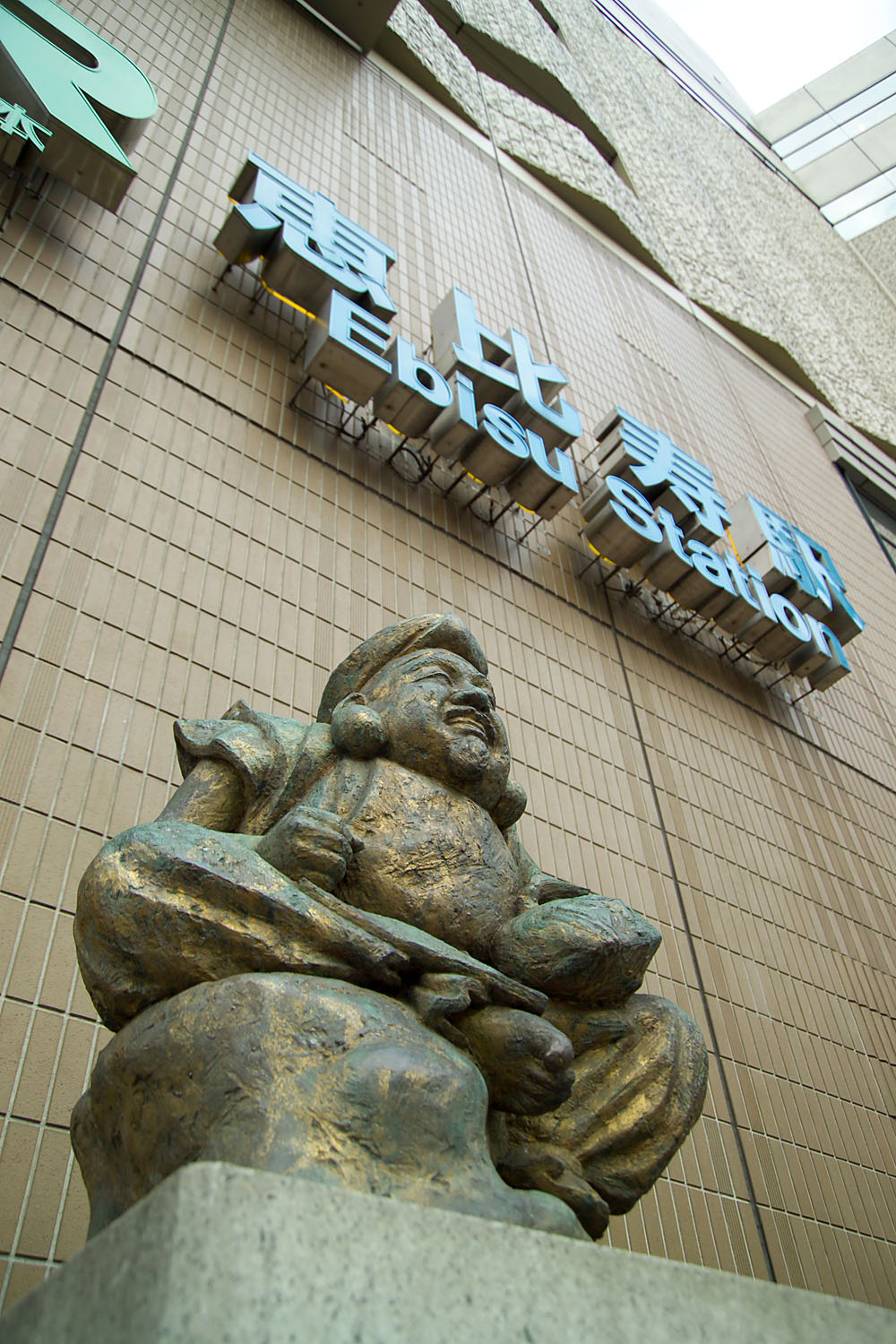
- Statue outside Ebisu station

Japanese name
- Shinjitai: 恵比寿駅
- Kyūjitai: 惠比壽驛
- Hiragana: えびすえき

General information
- Location: 1-chome Ebisu-Minami, Shibuya City, Tokyo; Japan
- Coordinates: 35°38′48″N 139°42′36″E
- Operator: JR East; Tokyo Metro
Location
- Location within Tokyo Yamanote Loop Location within Tokyo wards area Location within Japan

Ebisu Station (恵比寿駅, Ebisu-eki) is a railway station in the Ebisu neighborhood of Tokyo's Shibuya ward, operated by East Japan Railway Company (JR East) and the Tokyo subway operator Tokyo Metro. The station is named after Yebisu Beer, which was once brewed in an adjacent brewery, and which is itself named for the Japanese deity Ebisu.

== Lines ==
Ebisu is served by the following lines:

- East Japan Railway Company (JR East)
  - Yamanote Line
  - Saikyō Line
  - Shōnan-Shinjuku Line
- Tokyo Metro
  - Hibiya Line

== JR East station ==
EBSJA09 JS18 JY21 Ebisu Station 恵比寿駅
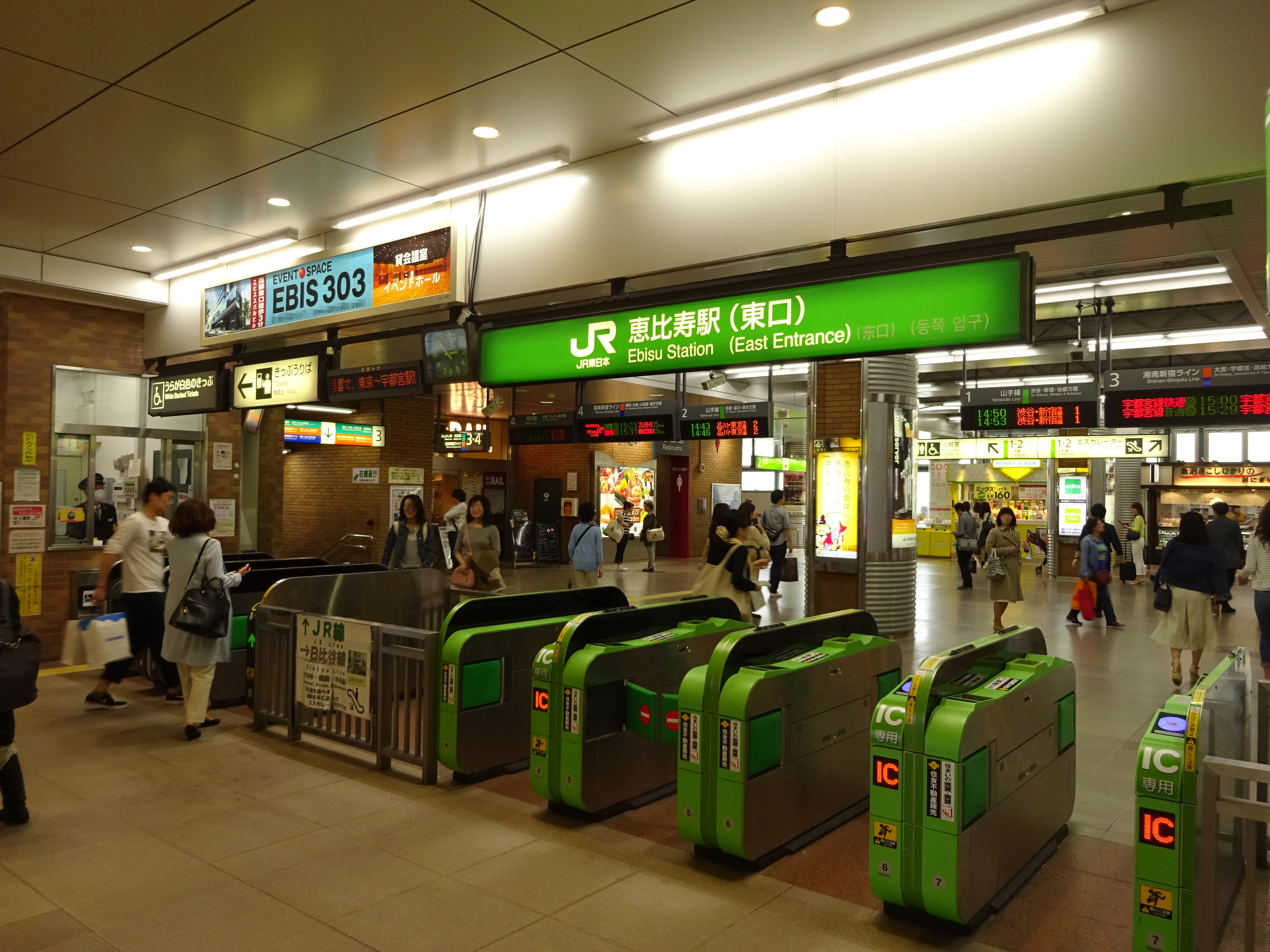
- JR station entrance in May 2016

General information
- Location: 1 Ebisu Minami, Shibuya-ku, Tokyo; Japan
- System: JR East station
- Operator: JR East
- Lines: Saikyō Line; Shōnan–Shinjuku Line; Yamanote Line
- Platforms: 2 island platforms
- Tracks: 4

Construction
- Structure type: Elevated

Other information
- Station code: JY21; JA09; JS18

History
- Opened: 30 October 1906; 119 years ago

Passengers
- FY2024: 252,020 (daily)

Services
Preceding station	JR East	Following station
Meguro JY22 Next counter-clockwise	Yamanote Line	Shibuya Next clockwise
Ōsaki towards Zushi	Shōnan–Shinjuku Line Rapid Local	Shibuya towards Utsunomiya
Ōsaki Terminus	Saikyō Line Commuter Rapid Rapid Local	Shibuya towards Ōmiya
Ōsaki towards Ebina	Sōtetsu–JR Link Line	Shibuya towards Shinjuku
Location

=== Platforms ===
The JR East station consists of two island platforms serving four tracks.

1	Yamanote Line	for Shibuya, Shinjuku, and Ikebukuro
2	Yamanote Line	for Shinagawa, Tokyo, and Ueno
3	Saikyo Line	for Shinjuku, Ikebukuro, and Ōmiya
3	Shōnan-Shinjuku Line	for Ōmiya, Utsunomiya, and Takasaki
4	Saikyō Line	for Ōsaki; Rinkai Line for Shin-Kiba; Sotetsu Line for Hazawa yokohama-kokudai and Ebina
4	Shōnan-Shinjuku Line	for Yokohama, Ōfuna, Odawara, and Zushi

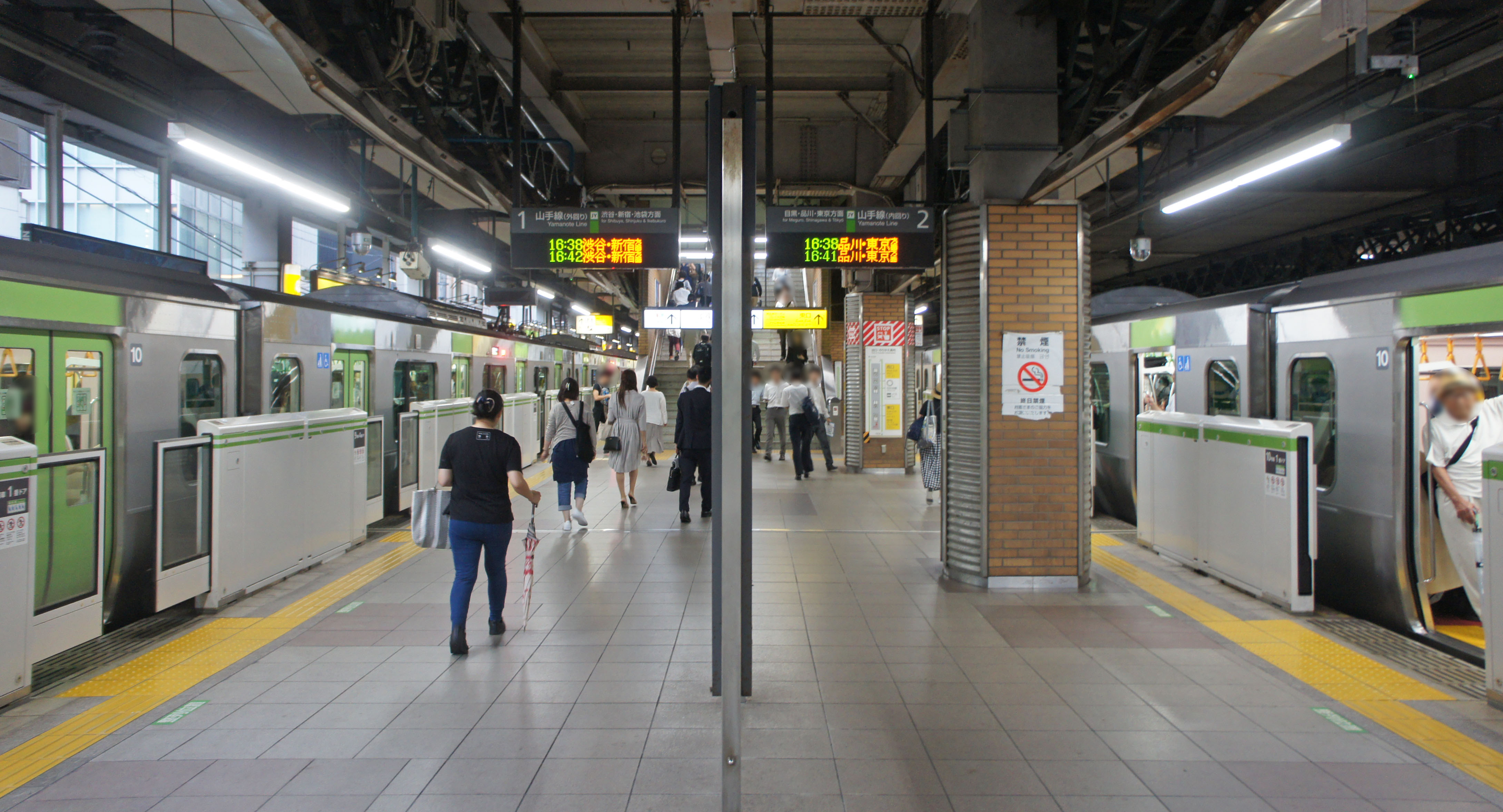
Platforms 1 and 2

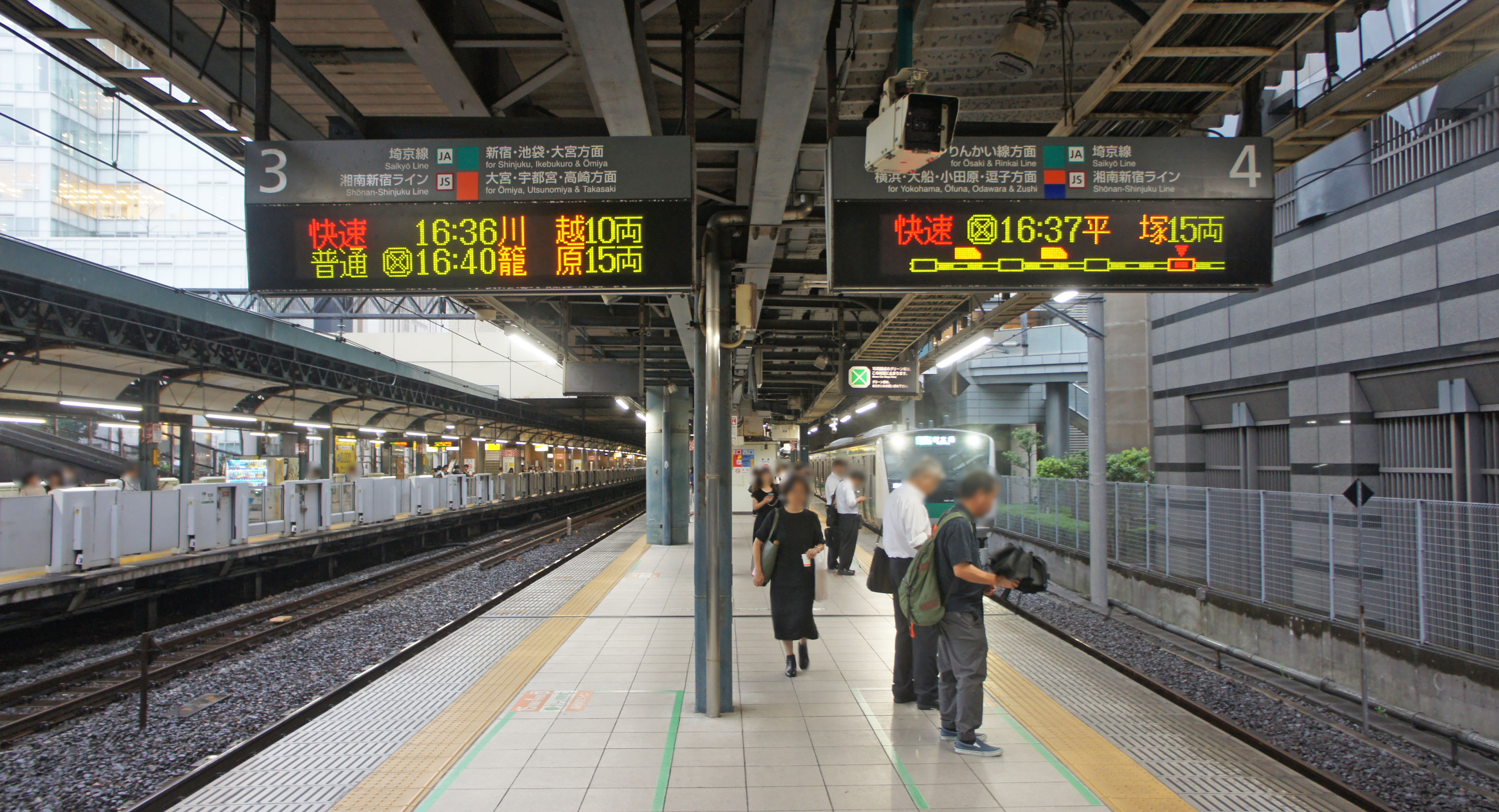
Platforms 3 and 4

=== Station melody ===
The melody known as "The Third Man Theme" (or as the "Ebisu Theme" in Japan) is played at the platforms just prior to train departures. This song and variations of it are used in Ebisu beer TV commercials and was made famous by the 1949 Orson Welles film noir, The Third Man, written by Graham Greene and featuring a very dark subject matter, the sale of fake penicillin in post-World War Vienna. The song, played on the zither by the previously unknown Austrian musician, Anton Karas, was a huge international hit in 1949 and 1950.

== Tokyo Metro station ==
Ebisu Station 恵比寿駅

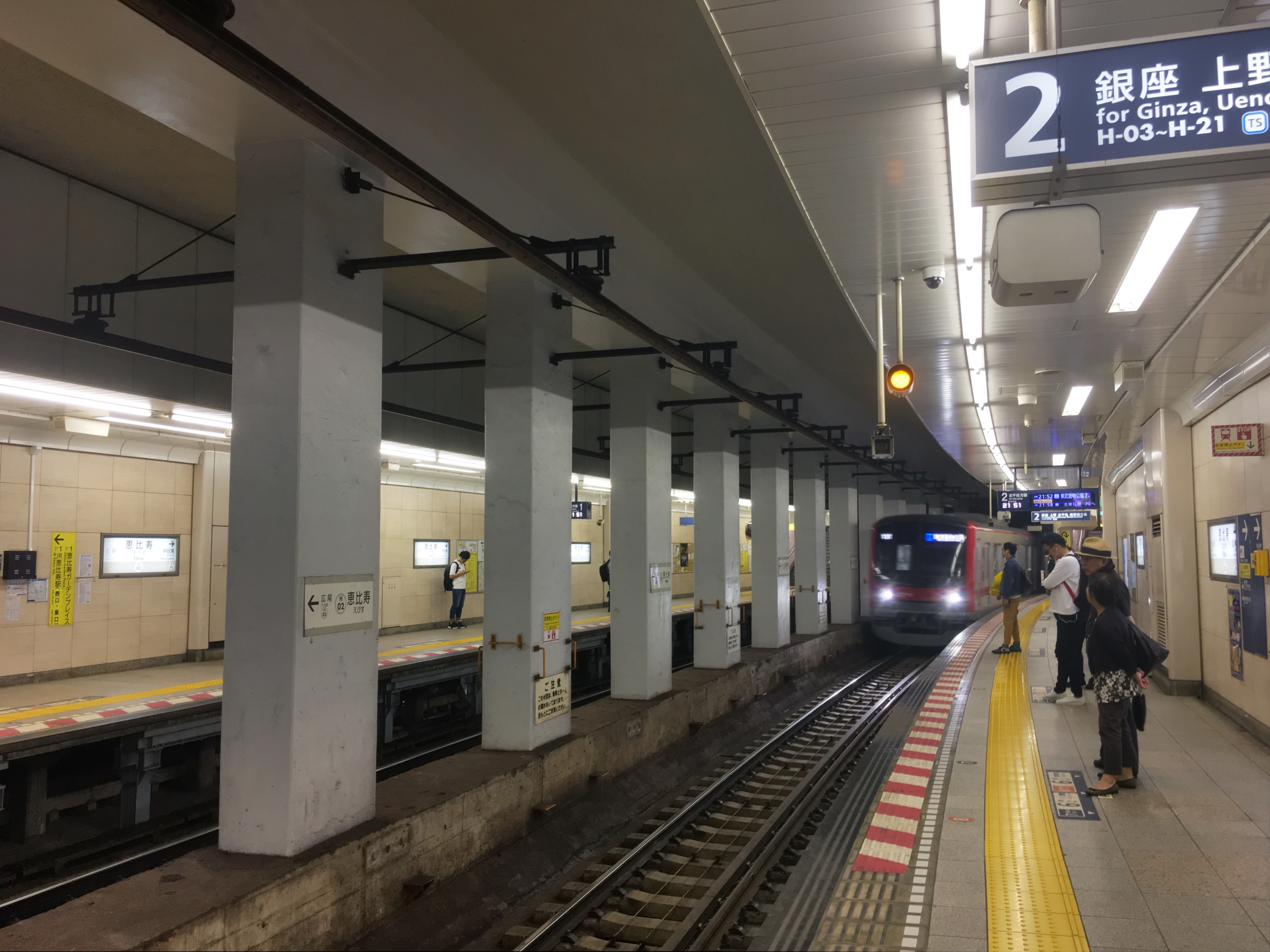
- Hibiya Line platforms in 2019

General information
- Location: 1-5-5 Ebisu Minami, Shibuya-ku, Tokyo; Japan
- System: Tokyo Metro station
- Operator: Tokyo Metro
- Line: Hibiya Line
- Platforms: 2 side platforms
- Tracks: 2

Construction
- Structure type: Underground

Other information
- Station code: H-02

History
- Opened: 25 March 1964; 62 years ago

Passengers
- FY2024: 104,751 (daily)

Services
Preceding station	Tokyo Metro	Following station
Terminus	TH Liner	Hiroo One-way operation
Naka-meguro Terminus	Hibiya Line	Hiroo towards Kita-Senju
Location

=== Platforms ===
The subway station has two side platforms serving two tracks.

1	Hibiya Line	for Naka-meguro
2	Hibiya Line	for Roppongi, Ginza, Ueno, and Kita-senju; Tobu Skytree Line for Tōbu-Dōbutsu-Kōen; Tobu Nikko Line for Minami-Kurihashi

== History ==
The station first opened in 1901 as a freight terminal for the neighboring Yebisu Beer factory. Passenger trains began to stop at the station on 30 September 1906. The Tokyo Tamagawa tram line was extended to the station in 1927. In May 1945, the station building burned to the ground amid the bombing of Tokyo. The subway station opened on 25 March 1964 and the tram service was discontinued in 1967 by the Teito Rapid Transit Authority (TRTA).

The Sapporo Brewery at Ebisu and its accompanying rail freight terminal were closed in 1982. The space was used for a "car train" service for several years before being redeveloped as the Ebisu Garden Place high-rise complex.

The Saikyo Line was extended to Ebisu in 1996. Through service to the Shonan-Shinjuku Line began in 2001, and to the Rinkai Line in 2002. Between 1996 and 2002, Ebisu served as the southern passenger terminus of the Saikyo Line, with Osaki Station being used as a turnaround point but not having passenger platforms connected to the line.

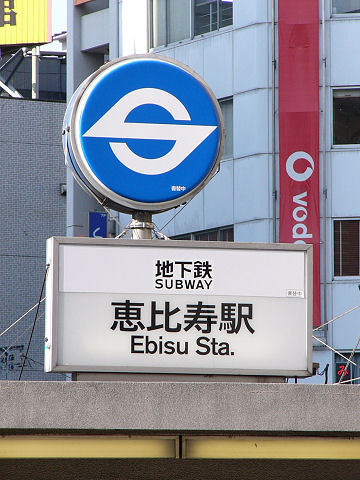
Old TRTA logo above station entrance, March 2004

The station facilities of the Hibiya Line were inherited by Tokyo Metro after the privatization of the Teito Rapid Transit Authority (TRTA) in 2004.

Chest-height platform edge doors were introduced on the two Yamanote Line platforms from 26 June 2010, the first time that such doors were installed on a JR line other than the Shinkansen.

Station numbering was introduced to the JR East platforms in 2016 with Ebisu being assigned station numbers JA09 for the Saikyo Line, JS18 for the Shonan-Shinjuku line, JY21 for the Yamanote Line. At the same time, JR East assigned the station a 3-letter code; Ebisu was assigned the code "EBS".

Morning TH Liner services terminating at this station commenced on 6 June 2020.

== Passenger statistics ==
In fiscal 2019, the JR East station was used by 145,805 passengers daily (boarding passengers only), making it the 20th-busiest station operated by JR East. In fiscal 2019, the Tokyo Metro station was used by an average of 117,796 passengers per day (exiting and entering passengers), making it the 30th-busiest station operated by Tokyo Metro.

The daily passenger figures for each operator in previous years are as shown below.

Fiscal year	JR East	Tokyo Metro
1999	129,081	
2000	127,967	
2005	131,507	
2010	130,245	
2011	128,555	
2012	130,241	98,217
2013	133,553	104,738
2014	135,493	107,471
2015	139,882	111,149
2016	143,898	115,726
2017	145,319	118,260
2018	147,699	119,939
2019	145,805	117,796

- Note that JR East figures are for boarding passengers only.

== See also ==
- List of railway stations in Japan
