= Sanno Park Tower =

Skyscraper in Japan

- 山王パークタワー
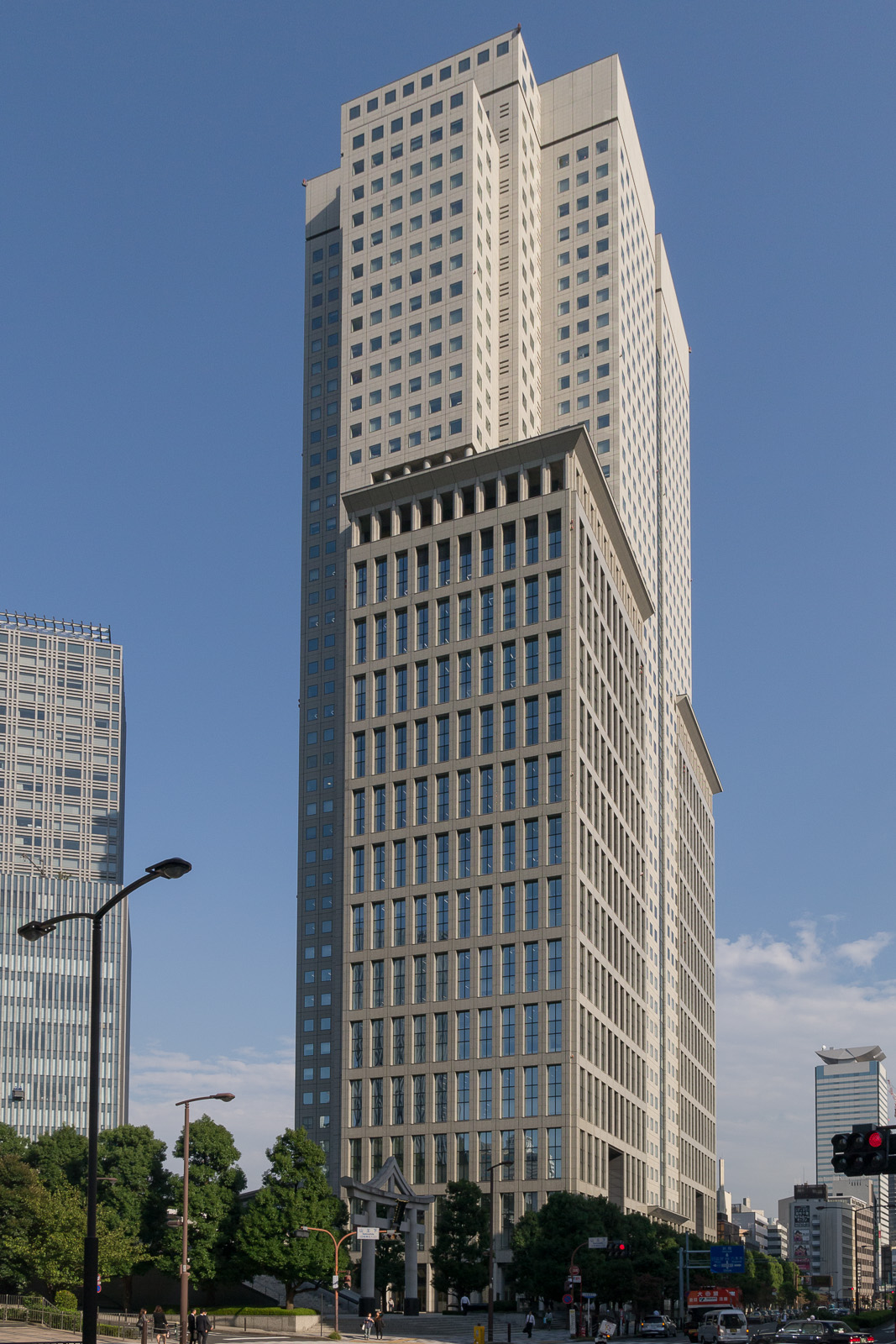
- Interactive map of the Sanno Park Tower area

General information
- Status: Completed
- Type: Office and restaurants
- Location: Chiyoda, Tokyo, Japan
- Coordinates: 35°40′23″N 139°44′25″E
- Completed: 2000
- Opening: February 2000
- Owner: Mitsubishi Estate

Height
- Antenna spire: 194.45 metres (638 ft)
- Roof: 183.8 metres (603 ft)
- Top floor: 44

Technical details
- Floor count: 48 (44 above ground, 4 underground)
- Floor area: 219,216 m^{2} (2,359,620 sq ft)
- Lifts/elevators: 61

Design and construction
- Structural engineer: Mitsubishi Jisho Sekkei Inc.
- Main contractor: Obayashi Corporation; Shimizu Corporation; Kajima Construction; Tokyu Construction

Sanno Park Tower (山王パークタワー, Sannō Pāku Tawā) is a 44-story skyscraper in Nagatachō, Chiyoda ward, Tokyo, Japan. It is the 8th highest building of the ward, after the Shin-Marunouchi Building, JP Tower, GranTokyo, etc. The building stands over Tameike-Sannō Station, which is served by the Tokyo Metro Ginza Line (G06) and the Tokyo Metro Namboku Line (N06), and linked to Kokkai-gijidō-mae Station (M14) on the Tokyo Metro Marunouchi Line.

== History ==
The site of the building was historically occupied by the Sanno Hotel, which was one of the leading luxury hotels in Tokyo at the time of its opening in 1932. The hotel served as the headquarters for dissident military units during the February 26 Incident in 1936, and as a United States Armed Forces family housing, billeting and lodging facility from 1946 to 1983. In October 1983, the site was returned to its original owner, Anzen Motor Car Co., and the hotel was closed, being replaced by the New Sanno Hotel in the Minami-Azabu area of Tokyo. The site was then vacant until 1996 as various re-development plans led by Mitsubishi Estate failed to materialize; at one time the building was designed to have over fifty floors. Construction on the site began in 1996 and was completed in January 2000.

Just at the foot of the Hie Shrine, the skyscraper overlooks both the Prime Minister of Japan's official residence (Sōri Kantei), across the street to the northeast, and the Diet Building. As a consequence, windows of the tower in the direction of the Prime Minister's residence are all locked, and the residence is designed with a barrier wall and no windows facing the tower. To achieve the building's height while obeying floor area ratio limitations under local zoning laws, air rights were bought from the neighboring Hie Shrine.

== Tenants ==
Pagani, an Italian sports car manufacturer, authorized Japanese dealer is located in the Sanno Park Tower Annex.

The headquarters of the largest mobile carrier in Japan, NTT docomo, are located on the 7th to 9th and 27th to 44th floors.

The lower floors house Tokyo offices of several multinational corporations, such as Lazard, Deutsche Bank, DuPont, Cushman & Wakefield, Philip Morris, Standard Chartered, Munich Re, Estée Lauder and Canonical.

The headquarters of the Consumer Affairs Agency of Japan was located on the 4th to 6th floors until March 2016.

The "Skylobby" at the 27th floor has restaurants and a observation deck.

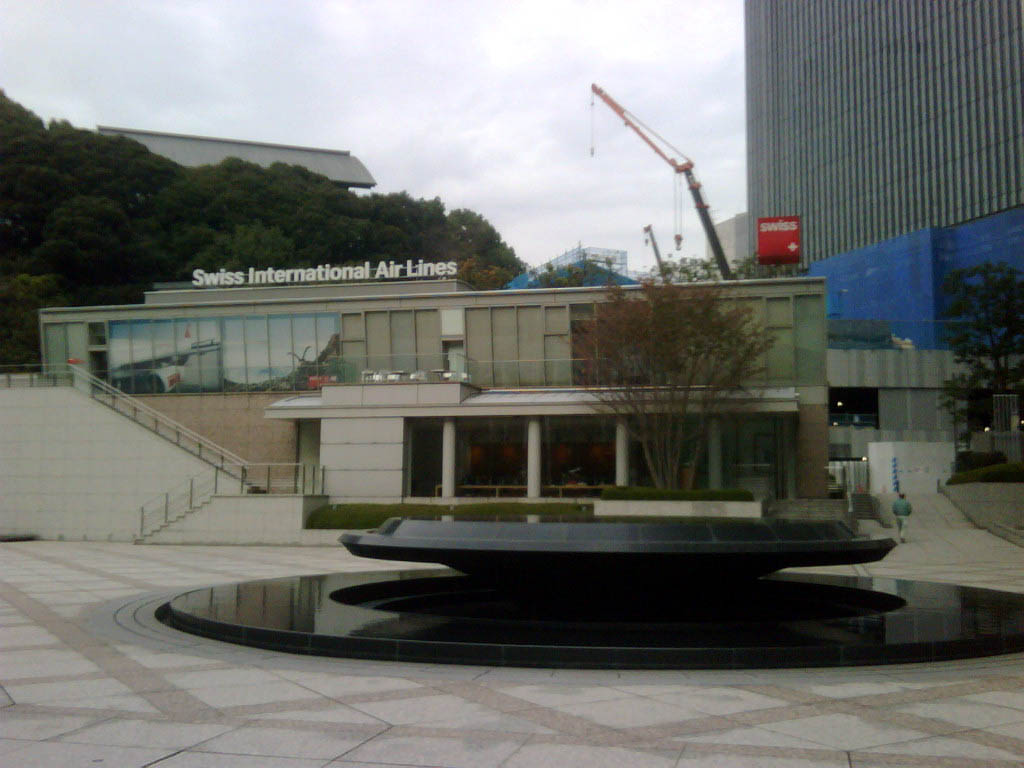
Sanno Park Tower Annex
