= Japan Act on Specified Commercial Transactions =

Japanese consumer protection regulation

The Japan Act on Specified Commercial Transactions (特定商取引法) aims to protect consumers from harm and to ensure fairness in commercial transactions. It is described and explained in a publication by the Japan Consumer Affairs Agency (JCAA). Door-to-door sales have been prone to conflicts between consumers and companies. It includes regulations on the act of soliciting.
