= New Sanno Hotel =

Military building in Tokyo, Japan

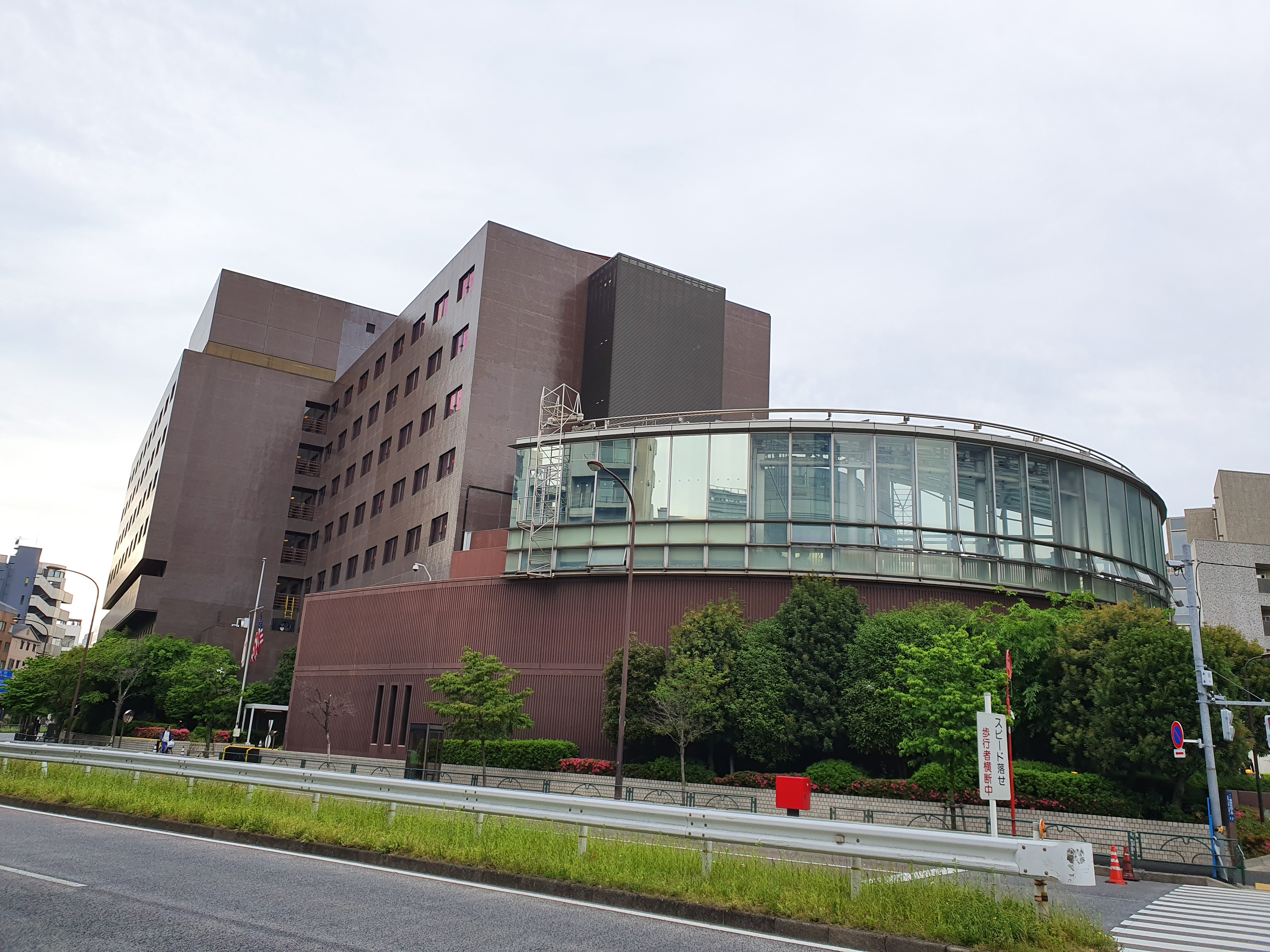
- The New Sanno Hotel in 2020

General information
- Location: Minami-Azabu, Minato, Tokyo
- Coordinates: 35.647254°N 139.724891°E
- Opening: 1983
- Operator: United States Navy

Website
- www.thenewsanno.com

The New Sannō Hotel, known as the New Sannō U.S. Force Center, is a U.S. military building located in downtown Tokyo. It offers a swimming pool, recreational facilities, a Navy Exchange, and other services designed for military travelers. The hotel is regulated and controlled by the U.S.–Japan Status of Forces Agreement.

In addition to active duty and retired U.S. military personnel eligible to use other Armed Forces Recreation Centers, DoD civilian employees duty stationing in Japan, contractors on DoD orders to execute contracts for the U.S. armed forces stationed in Japan, U.S. Embassy Tokyo personnel and individuals administratively attached to U.S. Embassy Tokyo are eligible to use the hotel.

== History ==
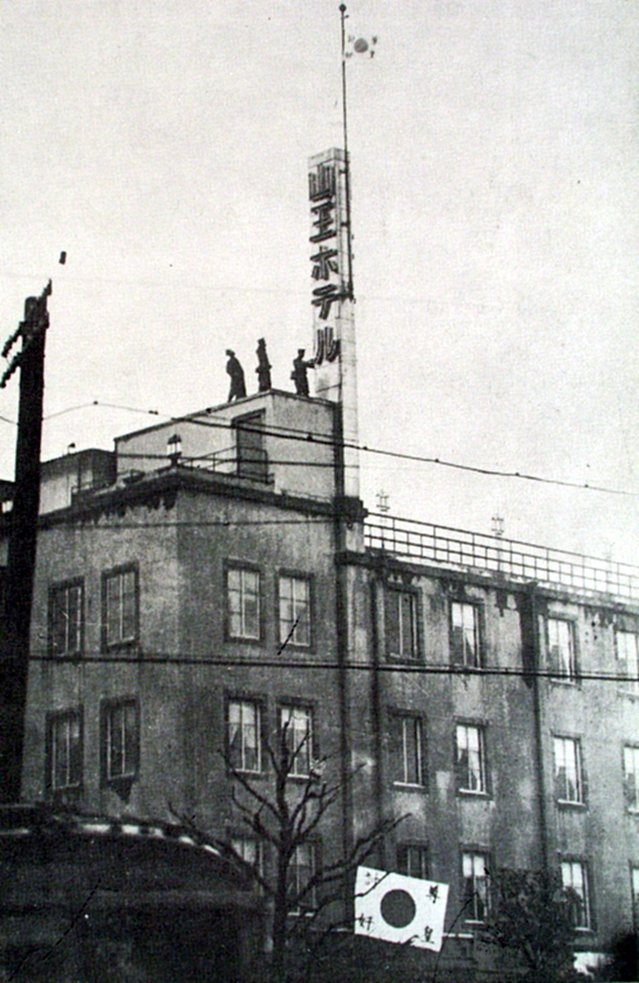
Sanno Hotel, Akasaka, at the time of the February 26 Incident in 1936.

=== Sanno Hotel ===
The original Sanno Hotel opened in 1932 on the southern side of Hie Shrine in Nagatachō, Tokyo, neighboring Akasaka, near the Imperial Palace and National Diet Building. The privately owned hotel, with a Western design, was considered one of the top three accommodations in Tokyo along with the Imperial Hotel and the Dai-chi Hotel, and was frequented by government and military officials. The hotel served as the headquarters for dissident military units during the February 26 Incident in 1936.

The hotel was gutted by Allied bombing during World War II. The American occupation forces took over the facility in 1946 and rebuilt it for use first as American family apartments and later as VIP and senior officers’ billeting. From 1959 to 1972, it was used as field officer lodging and from 1972 to 1975 as billeting for E-7 and above. During this time, the property remained under the ownership of Anzen Motor Car Co., its original owner, from whom the government of Japan leased the facility for use by the U.S. military.

In 1969, the property owners demanded the end of the leasing agreement and the return of the land and facility. After a prolonged legal battle, the Japanese government acquiesced with a promise to the U.S. military of providing an alternative location for a lodging facility in central Tokyo. The new location was in Minami-Azabu, Minato, Tokyo.

The old Sanno Hotel was closed in October 1983 and demolished. The site remained vacant until 2000 as various redevelopment plans failed to materialize. The site was ultimately used for a new 44-story office tower, the Sanno Park Tower, which opened on January 1, 2000 and currently houses the headquarters of NTT DoCoMo.

=== New Sanno Hotel ===
After eight years of planning and three years of construction at a cost of $39 million, the all-ranks New Sanno Hotel opened in October 1983. The new hotel was constructed on the site of what was previously the headquarters of electrical manufacturer Anritsu. The hotel was identically sized to the old Sanno Hotel, with 149 rooms, a floor area of 150,000 square feet (14,000 m^{2}), and parking for 74 cars. A $10 million renovation of the facility was conducted from 2004 through 2006.

The NSH was briefly closed on March 18, 2011.

On August 14, 2017, the Tokyo Metropolitan Police Department conducted an anti-terrorist exercise on hotel grounds.
