= Tameike-sannō Station =

Metro station in Tokyo, Japan

Coordinates: 35.672803°N 139.741416°E

Tameike-sannō Station 溜池山王駅

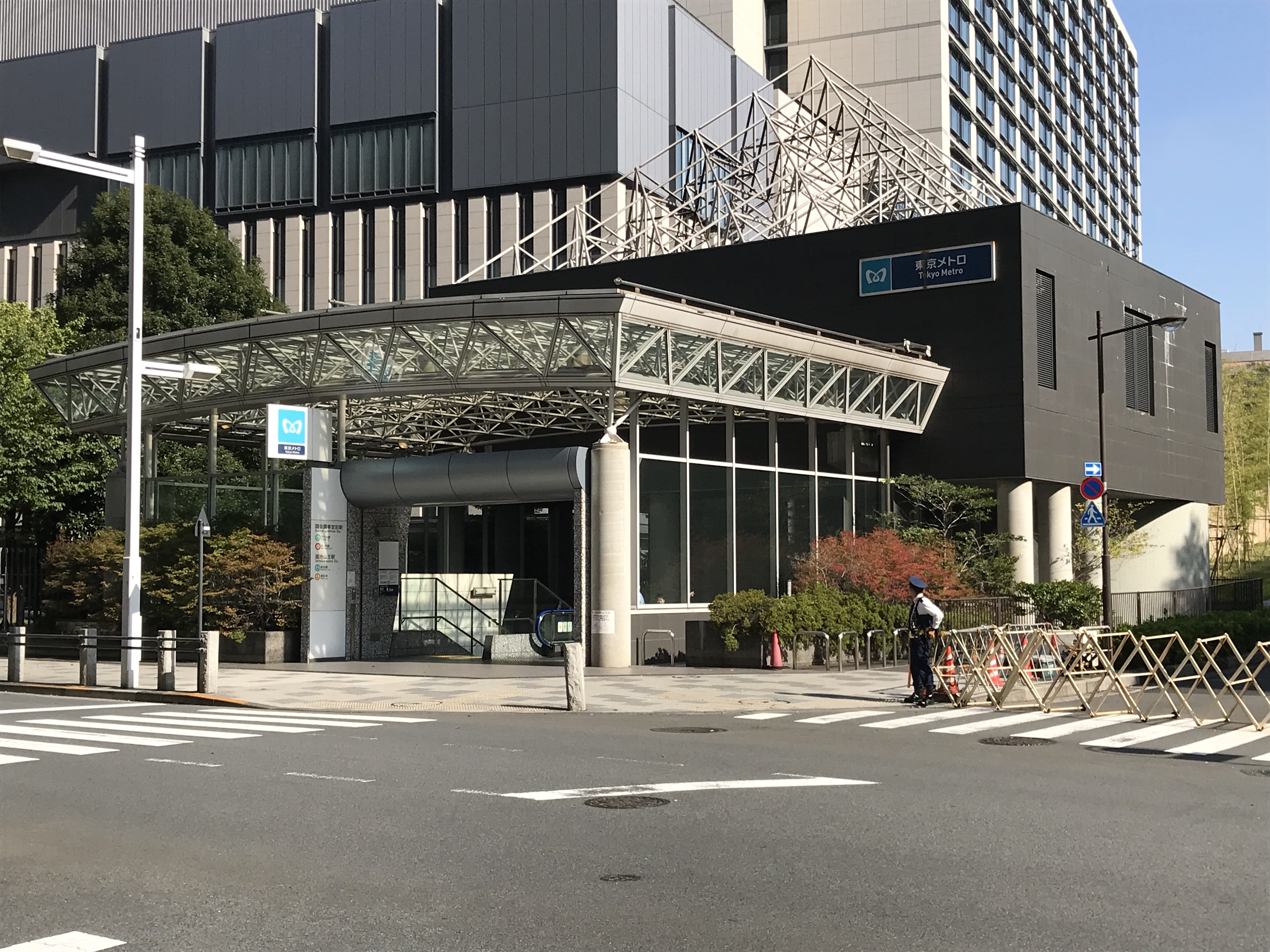
- Exit5 in November 2018

Japanese name
- Kyūjitai: 溜池山王駅
- Literal meaning: Reservoir and Sannō(Hie Shrine) Station

General information
- Location: 2-11-1 Nagatacho, Chiyoda City, Tokyo; Japan
- System: Tokyo subway
- Owner: Tokyo Metro Co., Ltd.
- Operator: Tokyo Metro
- Lines: Ginza Line; Namboku Line
- Platforms: 2 island platforms (1 for each line)
- Tracks: 4 (2 for each line)
- Connections: Kokkai-gijidō-mae

Construction
- Structure type: Underground

Other information
- Station code: G-06, N-06
- Website: Tameike-sannō Station

History
- Opened: 30 September 1997; 29 years ago

Services
Preceding station	Tokyo Metro	Following station
Akasaka-mitsuke towards Shibuya	Ginza Line	Toranomon towards Asakusa
Roppongi-itchōme towards Meguro	Namboku Line	Nagatacho towards Akabane-iwabuchi
Location
- Location within Tokyo Yamanote Loop Location within Tokyo wards area Location within Japan

Tameike-sannō (溜池山王駅, Tameike-sannō-eki) is a subway station in Tokyo, Japan, operated by the Tokyo subway operator Tokyo Metro. It is located in the ward of Chiyoda (Namboku Line platform) and Minato (Ginza Line platform).

== Lines ==
Tameike-sannō Station is served by the following two Tokyo Metro subway lines.

- Tokyo Metro Ginza Line (G-06)
- Tokyo Metro Namboku Line (N-06)

The station is also connected by underground passageways to Kokkai-gijidō-mae Station, which is served by the Tokyo Metro Marunouchi Line (with this transfer being an appreciable walking time) and Tokyo Metro Chiyoda Line, and it is possible to transfer between the two stations without crossing through the ticket gates.

== Station layout ==
The station has two island platforms serving four tracks.

=== Platforms ===
1
Ginza Line
for Akasaka-mitsuke and Shibuya
2
for Ginza, Ueno, and Asakusa
3
Namboku Line
for Nagatachō, Komagome, and Akabane-iwabuchi
Saitama Rapid Railway Line for Urawa-misono
4
- for Shirokane-takanawa and Meguro
- Meguro Line for Hiyoshi
- Tokyu Shin-Yokohama Line for Shin-Yokohama Station
- Sotetsu Main Line for Ebina via the Tokyu/Sotetsu Shin-Yokohama Line

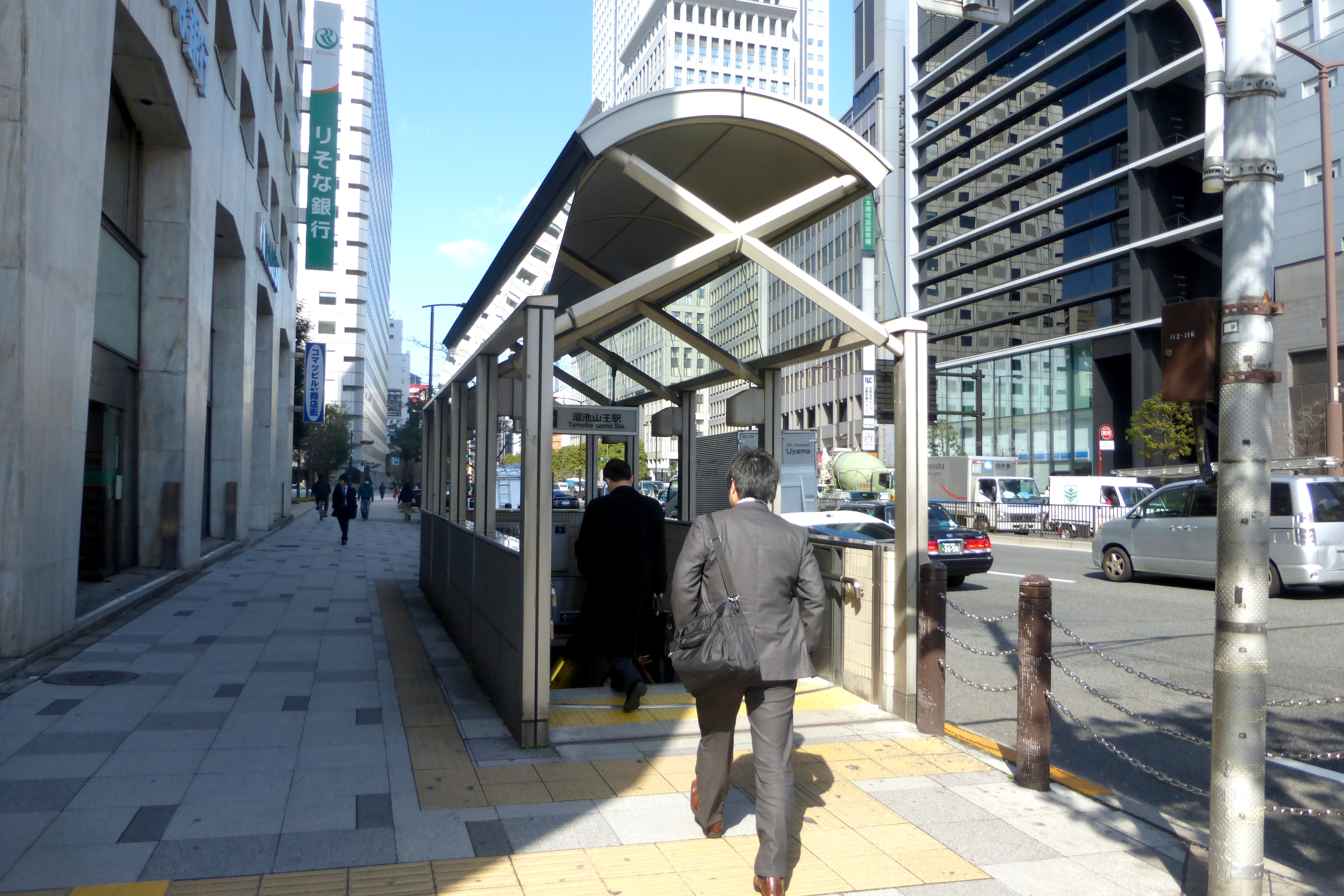
Exit 9

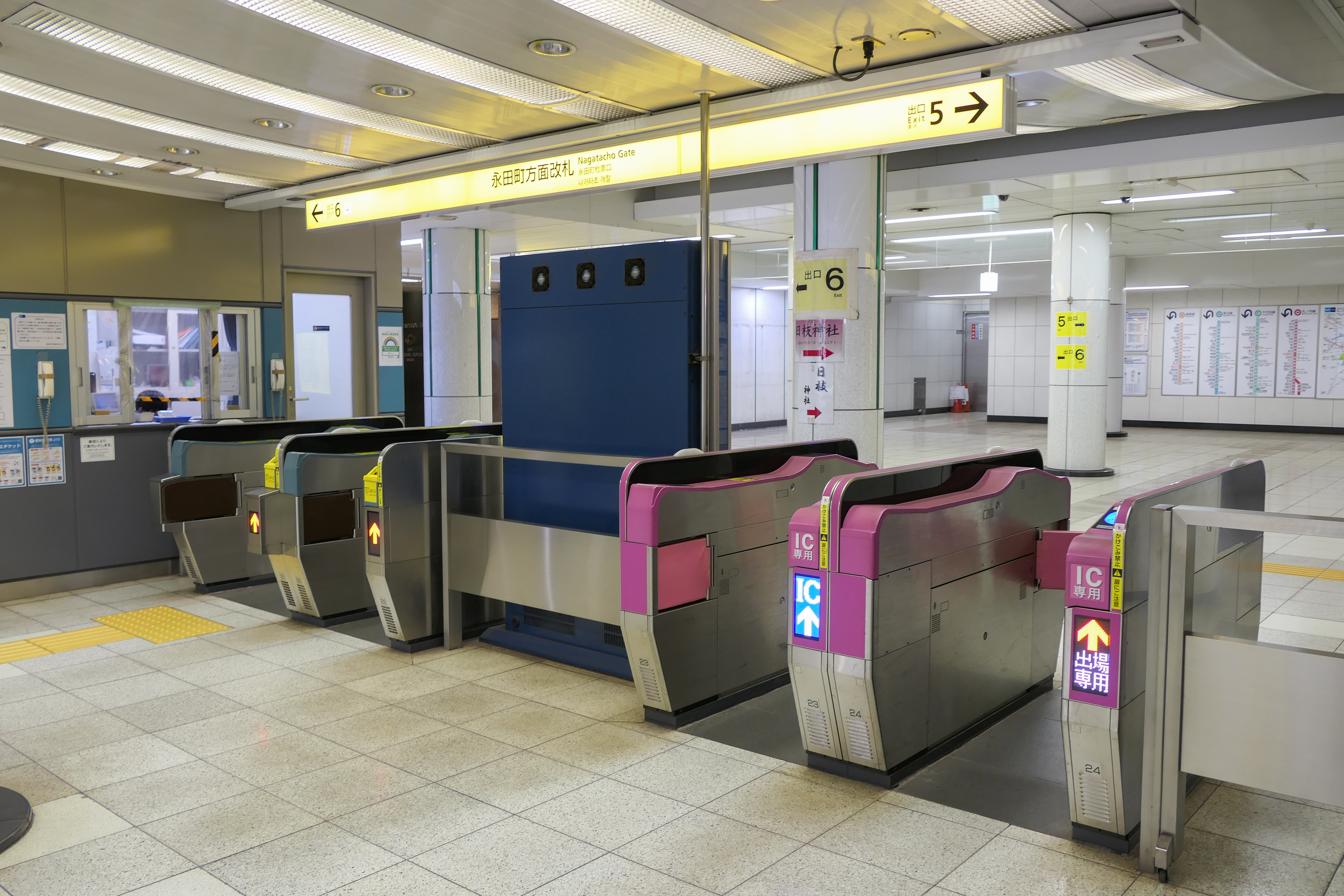
Tameike-sannō Station/Kokkai-gijidomae Station, ticket gate towards Nagatacho in January 2023

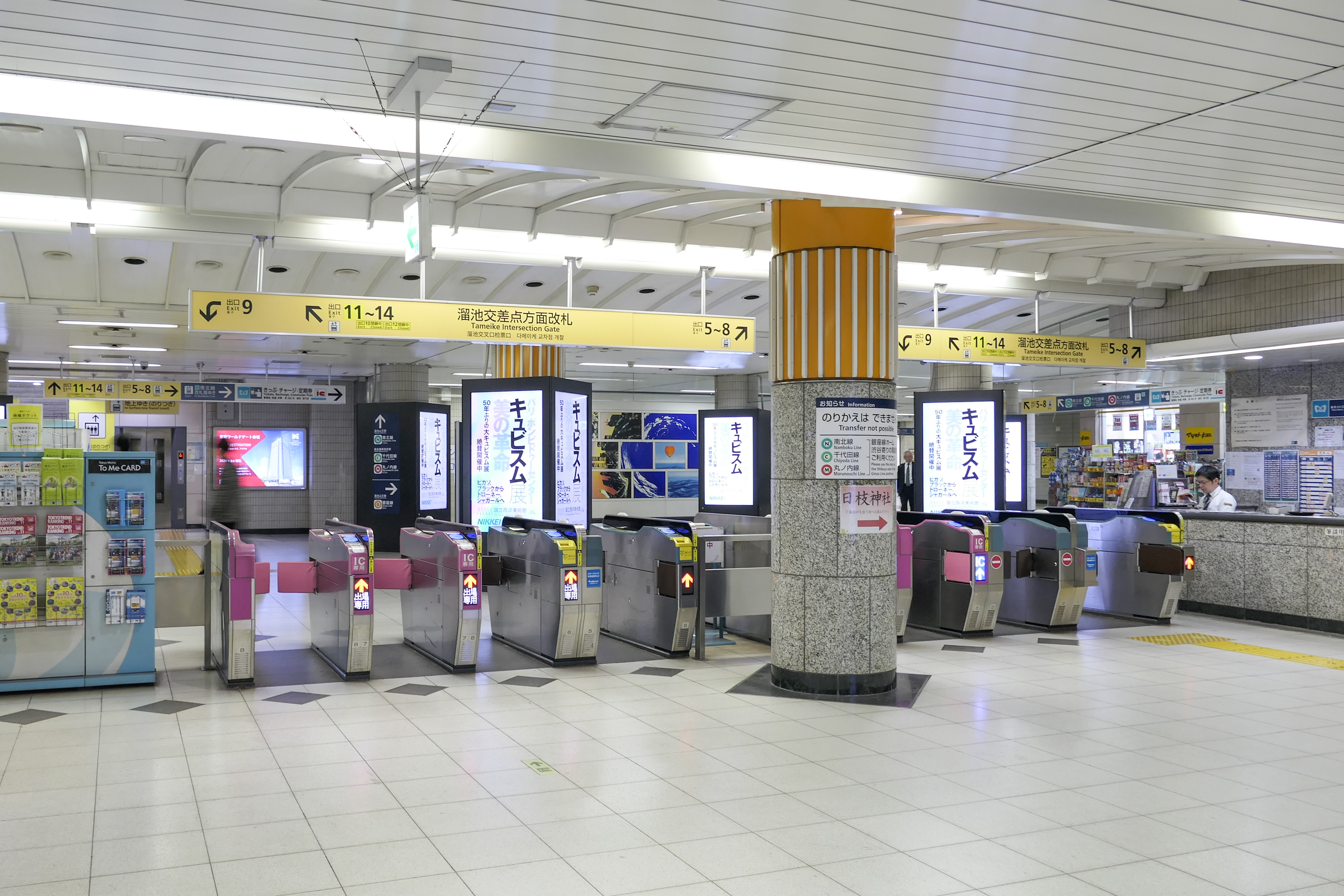
Ticket gate towards Tameike Intersection

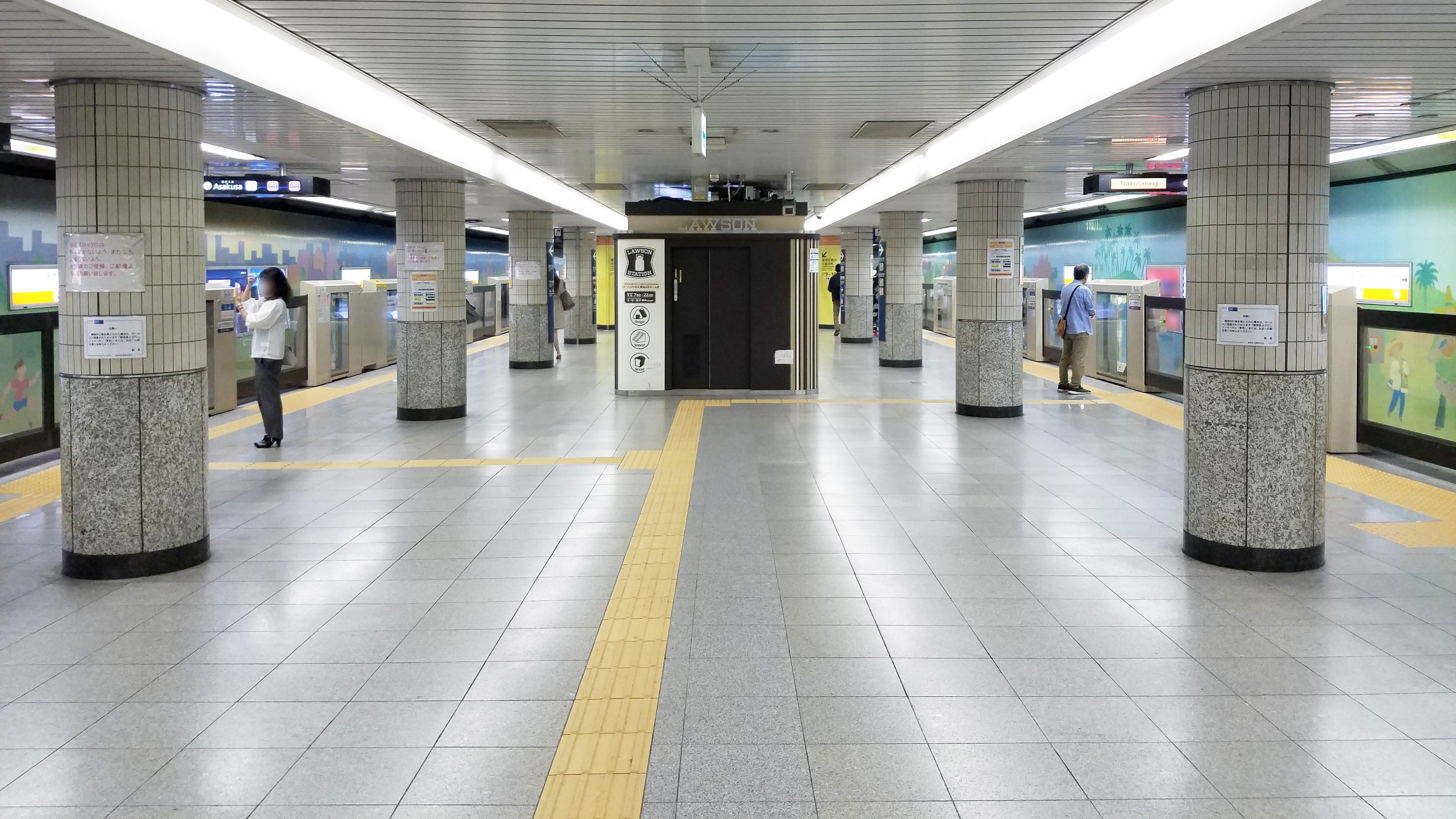
Ginza Line platform

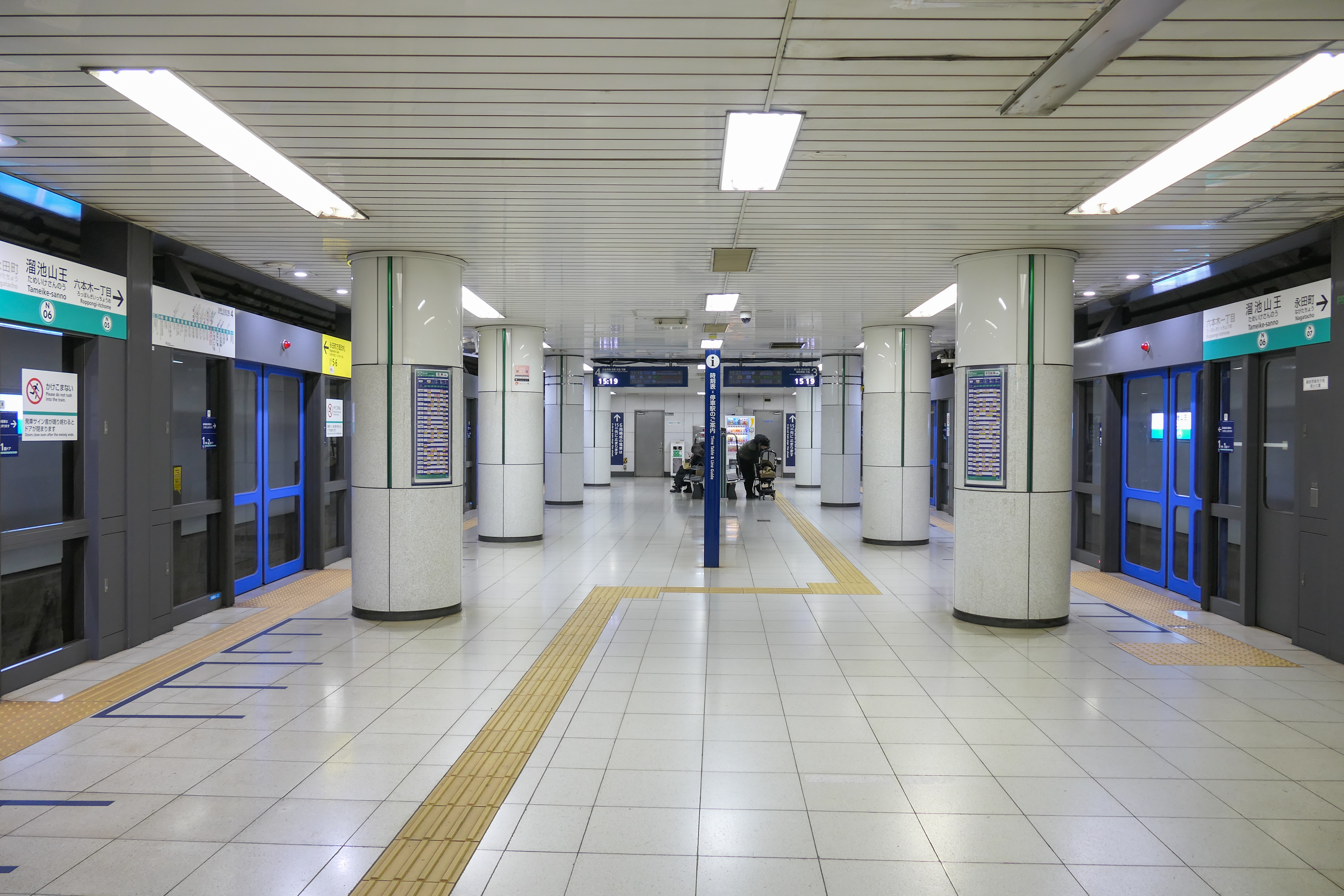
Namboku Line platform

== History ==
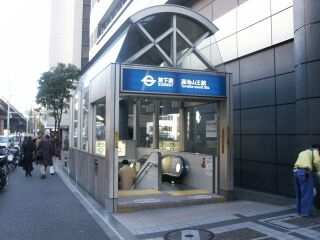
Exit 13 during the TRTA era

The station was opened on September 30, 1997, as the southern terminus of the Namboku Line by the Teito Rapid Transit Authority (TRTA). The Ginza Line platforms opened at the same time.

It was built as an Infill station to allow interchange between the Ginza and Namboku Lines.

The station was initially given the provisional name "Tameike Station." However, because it was built on the border between Minato and Chiyoda wards, a naming dispute arose. Minato Ward wanted to keep "Tameike Station" referencing the old Tameike Stop on the Tokyo Toden Tameike Line (lines 3 and 6), which opened in 1905 and ran above ground along Sotobori Street until 1967. Meanwhile, Chiyoda Ward pushed for "Sannoshita Station," derived from the former line's Sannoshita Stop. This conflict between the two wards complicated the decision-making process. Ultimately, the matter was resolved by incorporating input from both sides and adopting a combined name.

The station facilities were inherited by Tokyo Metro after the privatization of the Teito Rapid Transit Authority (TRTA) in 2004.

== Passenger statistics ==
In fiscal 2019, this station and Kokkai-gijidō-mae combined had an average of 150,922 passengers daily.

== Surrounding area ==
- Kantei (official residence of the Prime Minister of Japan)
- Cabinet Office
- Sanno Park Tower
- Prudential Tower in Tokyo
- The Capitol Hotel Tokyu
- Hie Shrine
- Hibiya High School
- Tokyo Broadcasting System (TBS)
- Komatsu Limited
- Embassy of the United States, Tokyo

== See also ==
- Nagatachō, Tokyo
- Akasaka, Tokyo
