= Consumer Affairs Agency =

- 消費者庁; Shouhisha-chō

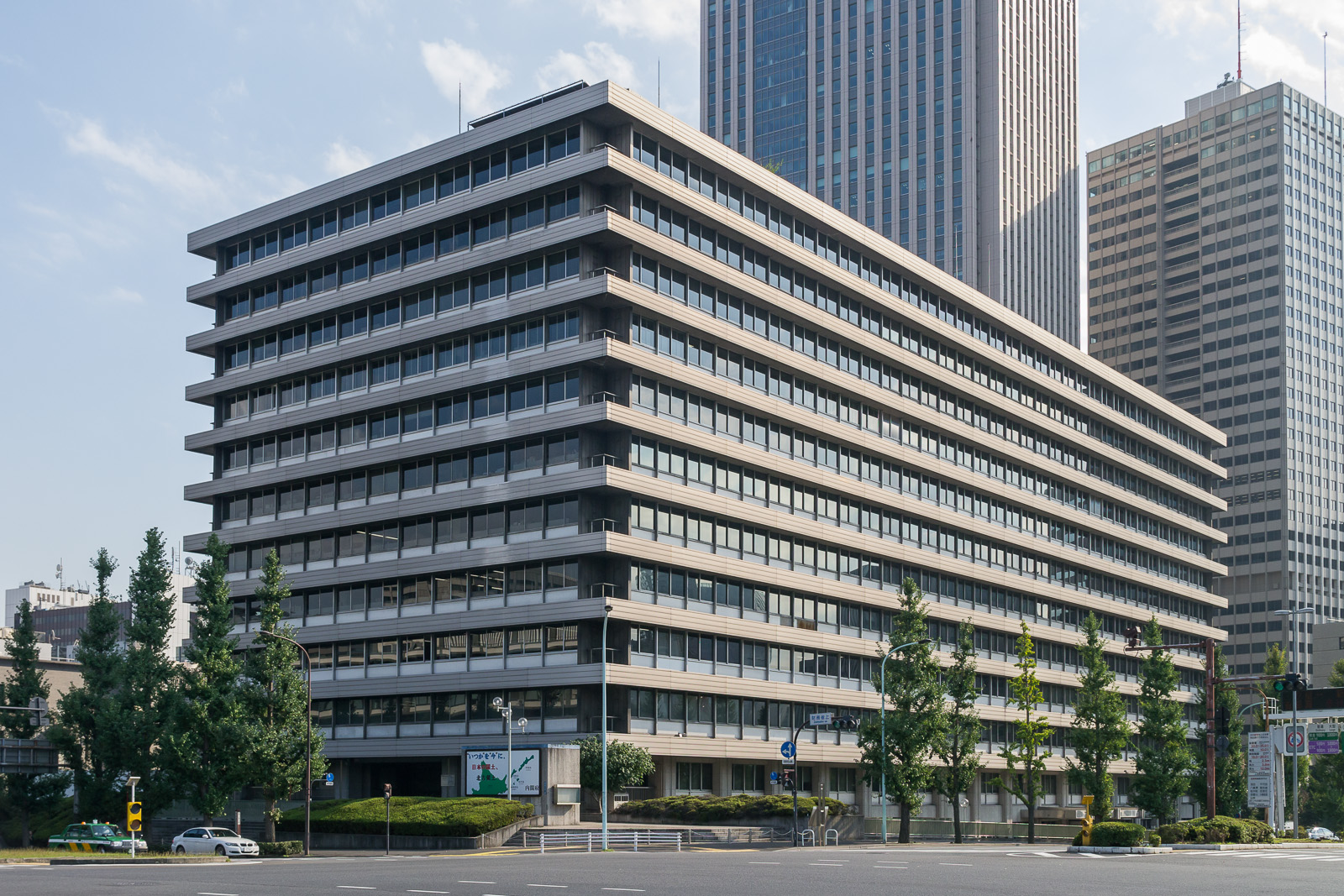
- Central Complex Building No. 4 Building

Agency overview
- Formed: September 1, 2009
- Jurisdiction: Japan
- Headquarters: Sanno Park Tower 2-11-1 Nagatachō, Chiyoda-ku, Tokyo, Japan 100-6178
- Employees: 270
- Ministers responsible: Yoshitaka Itō, Minister of State for Consumer Affairs and Food Safety; Jirō Hatoyama, State Minister; Eriko Imai, Parliamentary Vice-Minister
- Agency executive: Yutaka Arai, Commissioner
- Parent agency: Cabinet Office
- Website: caa.go.jp

The Consumer Affairs Agency (消費者庁, shōhishachō) is an administrative agency of the Cabinet Office of Japan responsible for consumer protection established on September 1, 2009.

Under the law passed on December 10, 2022, the Consumer Affairs Agency now also has jurisdiction over the issue of donations between religious juridical persons and their followers. Until then, the Agency for Cultural Affairs had jurisdiction over all administration related to religious juridical persons. This legislation was intended to address the Unification Church's "Spiritual sales", which has become a serious problem in Japanese society.

== Background ==
Individual ministries had their own relevant departments, but after a number of scandals involving food poisoning and various types of accidents caused by substandard products manufactured in or imported to Japan, it was decided that an independent body was needed to protect the interests of consumers. Consumers often did not know where to report problems, and if they did, complaints were often passed around from place to place inside the bureaucracies. In addition, past administrative policies tended to focus more on the needs and interests of producers and industry, rather than consumers.

The original plans for the agency were made in January 2008 under the administration of Liberal Democratic Party Prime Minister Yasuo Fukuda, after a high-profile food poisoning case of Chinese dumplings. The bill to create the agency cleared the lower house of the Japanese diet unanimously on April 16, 2009 under the administration of Tarō Asō and with the cooperation of the then-opposition Democratic Party of Japan.

It was originally planned to open in October 2009 or later, but leading up to the 2009 election Prime Minister Aso brought forward the opening to September 1, 2009, two days after the election. As a consequence, the agency was not well-prepared and faced many initial challenges. Shunichi Uchida, a former vice-minister of the Cabinet Office, was appointed the first head of the agency.
