= Kokkai-gijidō-mae Station =

Metro station in Tokyo, Japan

Coordinates: 35.674119°N 139.745246°E

Kokkai-gijidō-mae Station [National Diet Bldg.] 国会議事堂前駅

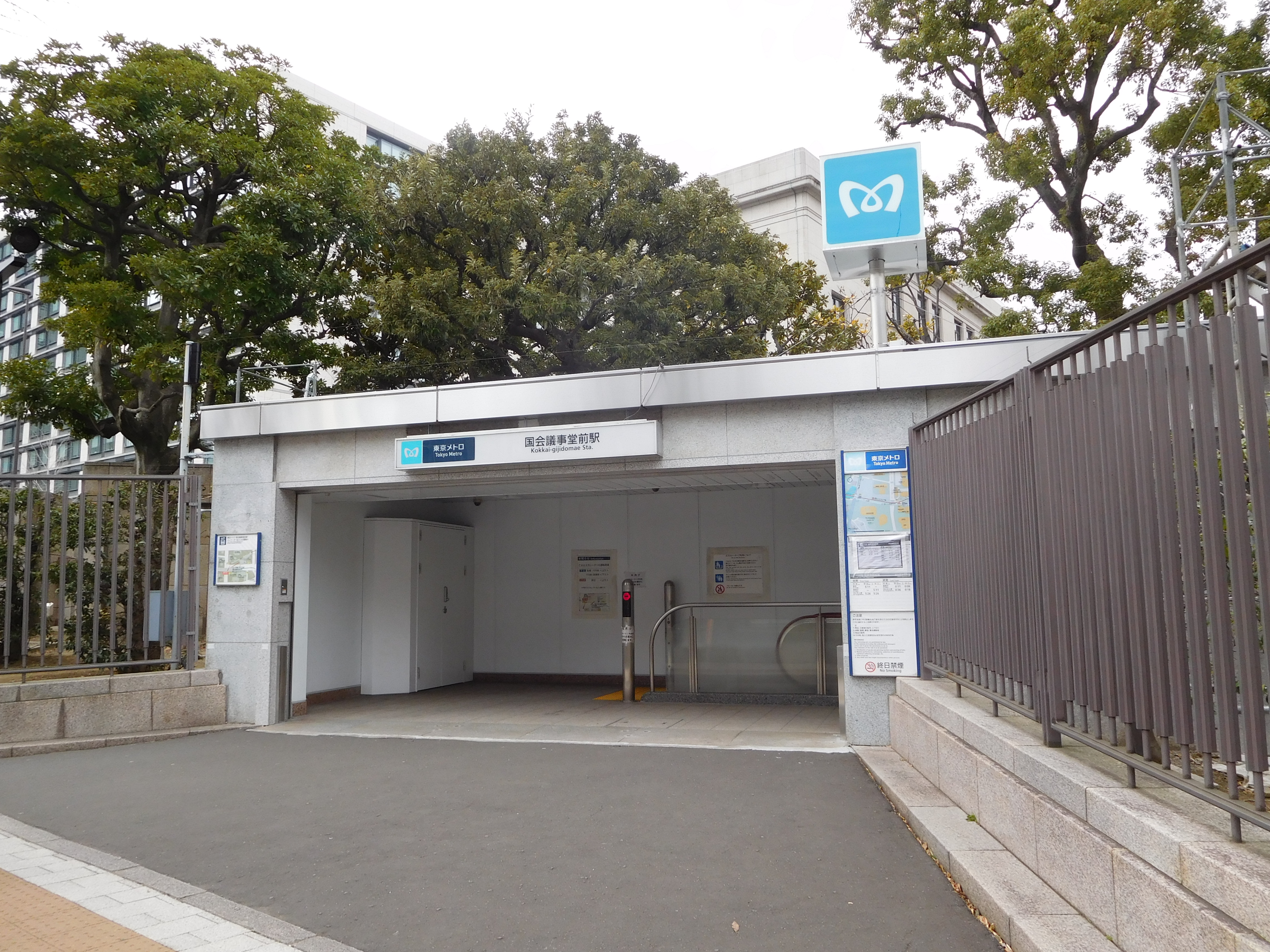
- Exit 1, February 2017

Japanese name
- Shinjitai: 国会議事堂前駅
- Kyūjitai: 國會議亊堂前驛
- Hiragana: こっかいぎじどうまええき
- Literal meaning: in front of the National Diet Building

General information
- Location: 1-7-1 Nagatachō, Chiyoda, Tokyo; Japan
- System: Tokyo subway
- Owner: Tokyo Metro Co., Ltd.
- Operator: Tokyo Metro
- Lines: Chiyoda Line; Marunouchi Line
- Platforms: 2 side platforms (Marunouchi Line); 1 island platform (Chiyoda Line)
- Tracks: 4 (2 on each level)
- Connections: Tameike-sanno

Construction
- Structure type: Underground
- Depth: 37.9 m (124 ft) (Chiyoda Line platform)

Other information
- Station code: C-07, M-14

History
- Opened: 15 March 1959; 67 years ago

Services
Preceding station	Tokyo Metro	Following station
Akasaka-mitsuke towards Ogikubo or Hōnanchō	Marunouchi Line	Kasumigaseki towards Ikebukuro
Akasaka towards Yoyogi-Uehara	Chiyoda Line	Kasumigaseki towards Kita-Ayase
Location
- Location within Tokyo Yamanote Loop Location within Tokyo wards area Location within Japan

Kokkai-gijidōmae station (国会議事堂前駅, Kokkai-gijidō-mae eki) is a subway station in Chiyoda, Tokyo, Japan, operated by the Tokyo subway operator Tokyo Metro. It is located adjacent to the National Diet Building.

The station name literally means "in front of the National Diet Building".

== Lines ==
Kokkai-gijidō-mae Station is served by the following lines.

- Tokyo Metro Marunouchi Line (M-14)
- Tokyo Metro Chiyoda Line (C-07)

The station is also connected by underground passageways to Tameike-sannō Station, which is served by the Ginza and Namboku Lines, and it is possible to transfer between the two stations without passing through the ticket gates.

== Station layout ==
The Chiyoda Line platforms are 37.9 m underground, making this station the deepest in the Tokyo Metro network (although a number of stations on the Ōedo Line are farther underground).

1	Marunouchi Line	for Ogikubo and Honancho
2	Marunouchi Line	for Ikebukuro
3	Chiyoda Line	for Omote-sando and Yoyogi-uehara; Odakyu Odawara Line for Hon-Atsugi and Isehara
4	Chiyoda Line	for Otemachi, Kita-senju, Ayase, and Kita-ayase; Jōban Line (Local) for Abiko and Toride

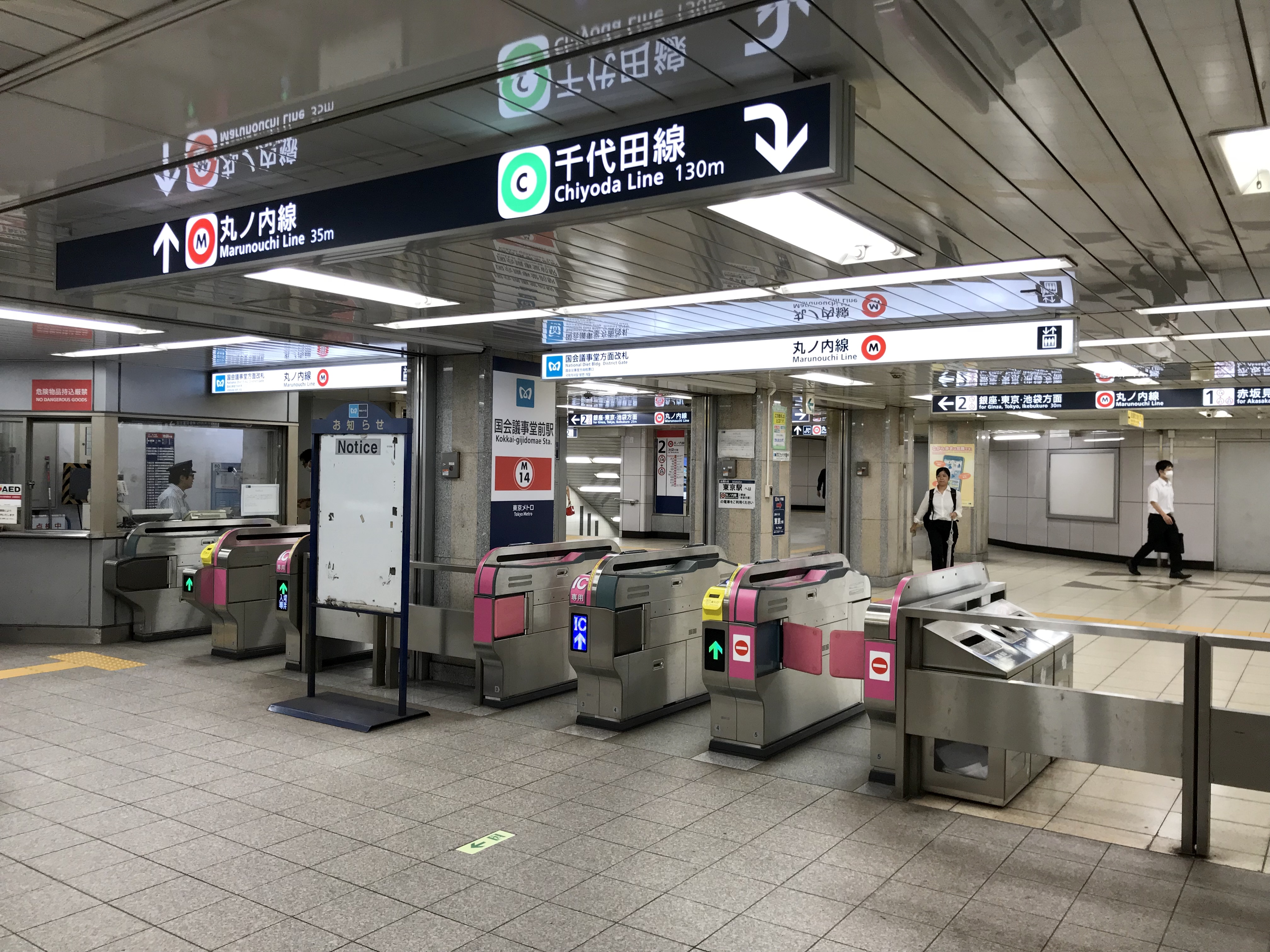
Marunouchi Line concourse

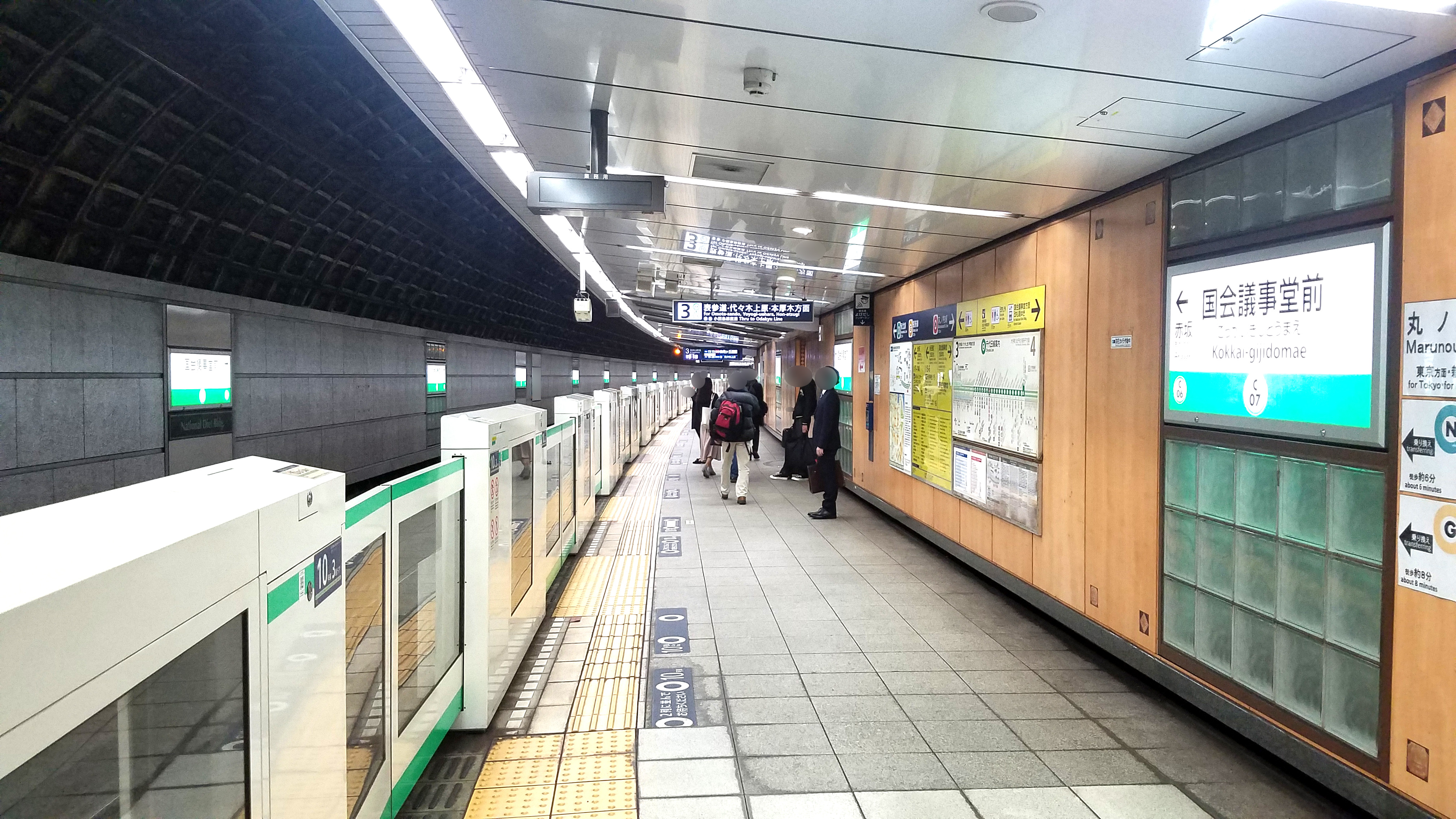
Chiyoda Line platform

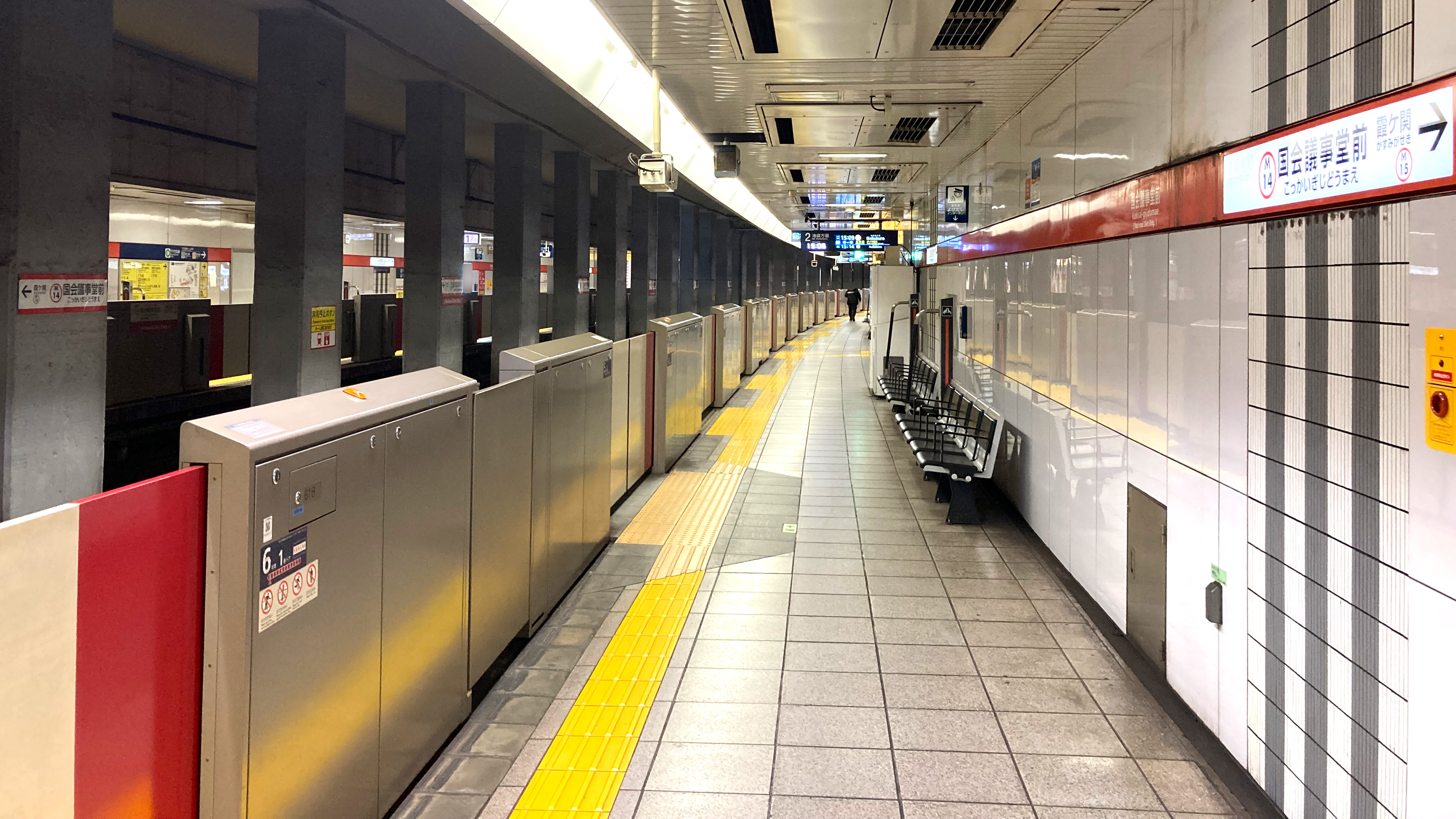
Marunouchi Line platforms

== History ==
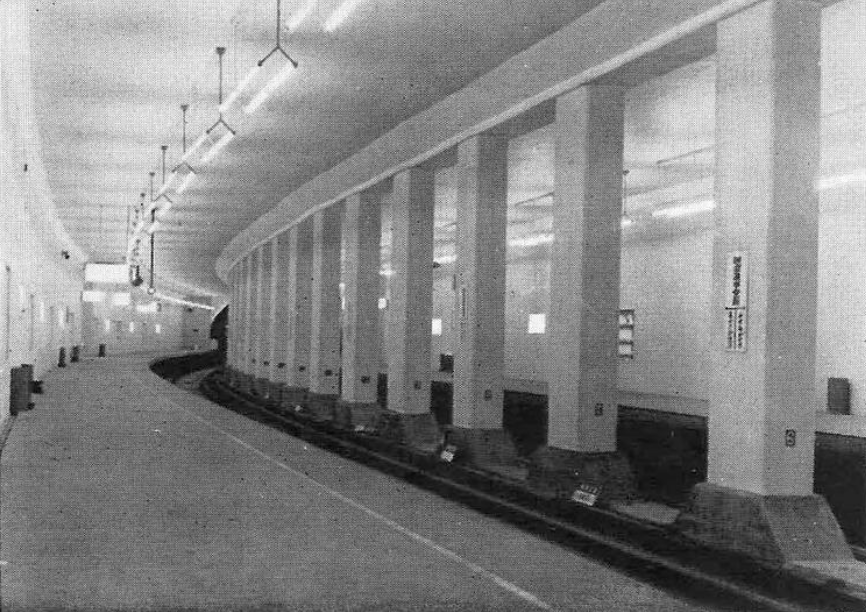
The Marunouchi Line platforms in 1959

The station was firstly opened on March 15, 1959, as a station on the Marunouchi Line by the Teito Rapid Transit Authority (TRTA). The Chiyoda Line platforms opened on October 20, 1972. It also became possible to transfer to the Ginza and Namboku lines via a passageway to the newly opened Tameike-Sannō Station which opened on September 30, 1997.

The station facilities were inherited by Tokyo Metro after the privatization of the TRTA in 2004.

== Passenger statistics ==
In fiscal 2019, this station and Tameike-sannō combined had an average of 150,922 passengers daily.

== Surrounding area ==
- National Diet Building
- Prime Minister's Official Residence (Japan)
- Cabinet Office
- Hibiya High School
- Hie Shrine
- The Capitol Hotel Tokyu
