= Nagatachō =

Neighborhood in Chiyoda, Tokyo, Japan

Coordinates: 35.678757°N 139.740258°E

Nagatachō 永田町
- Central business district
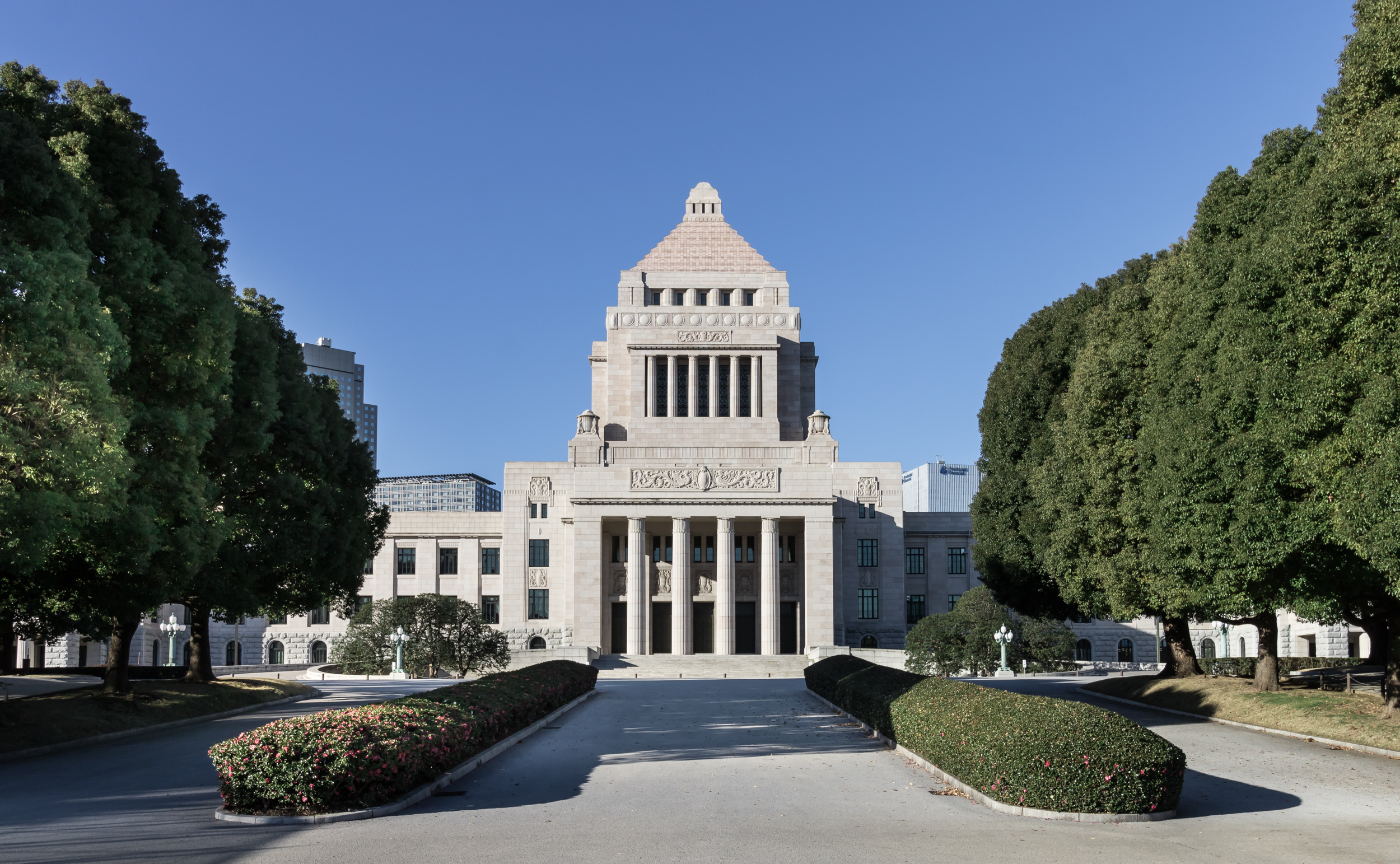
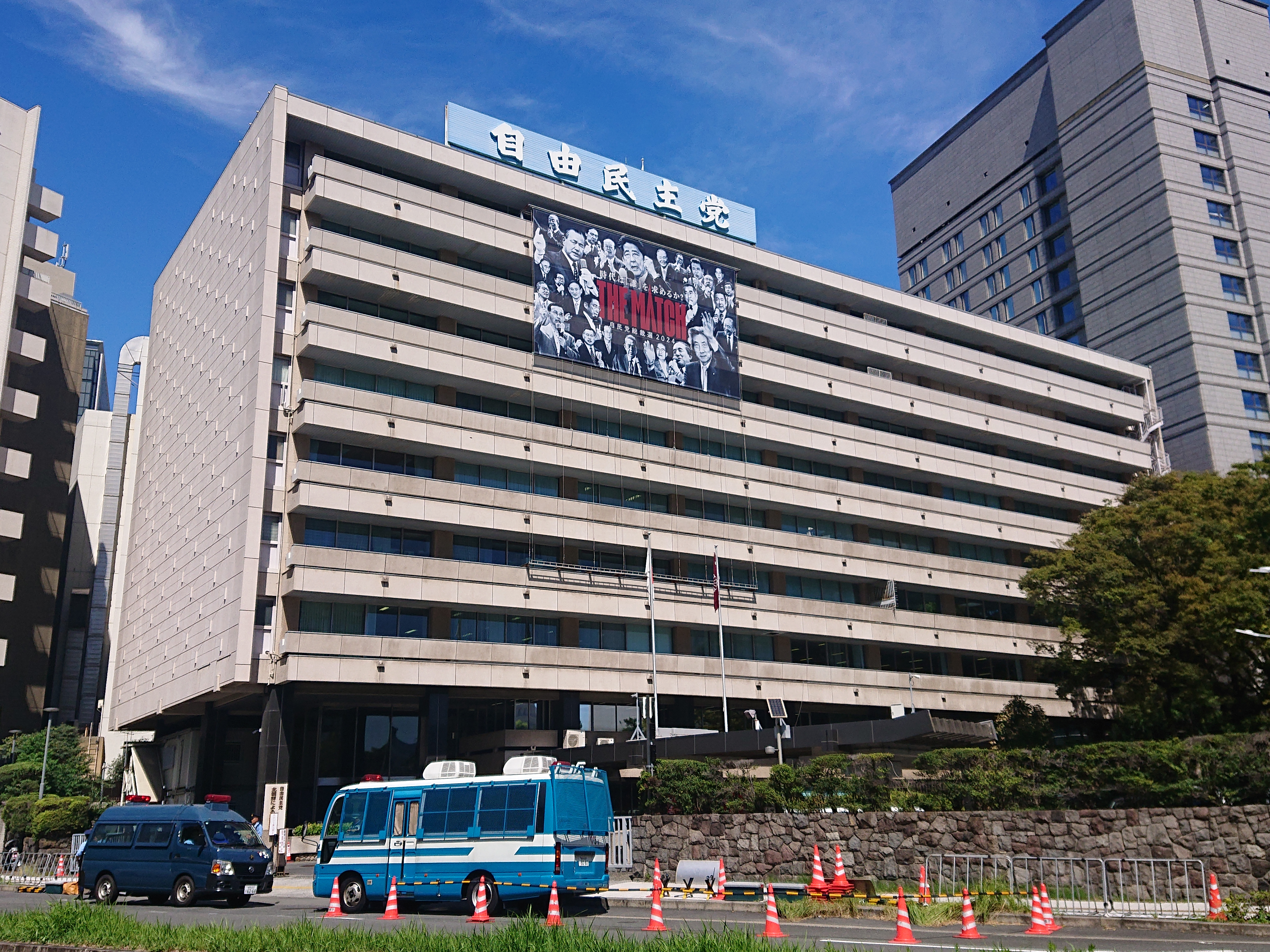
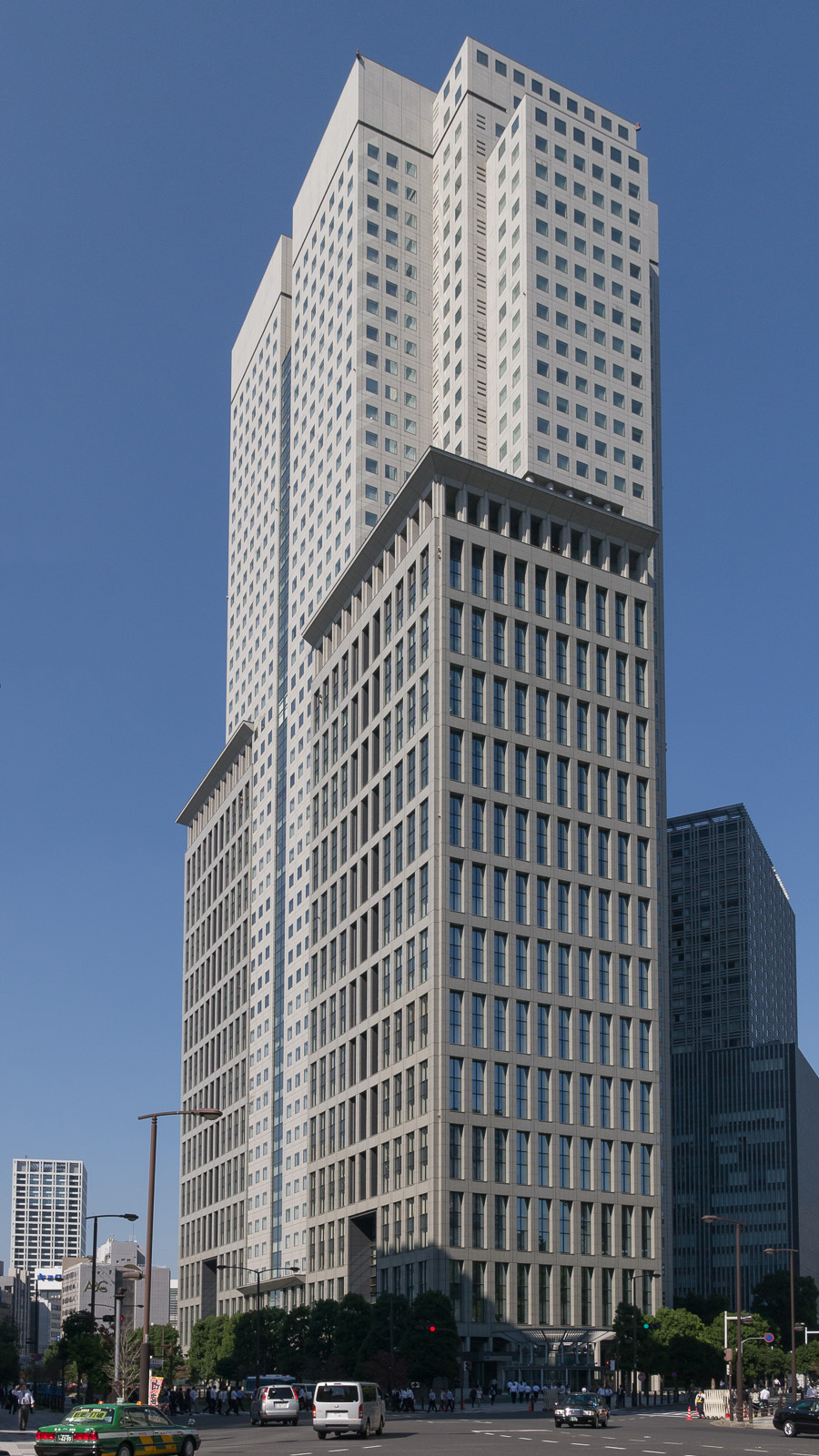
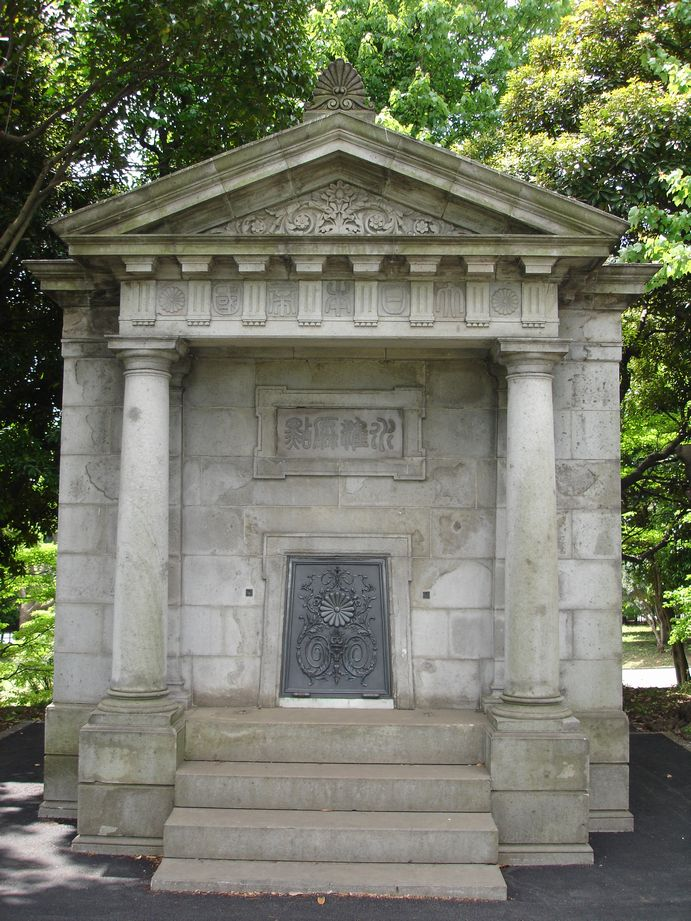
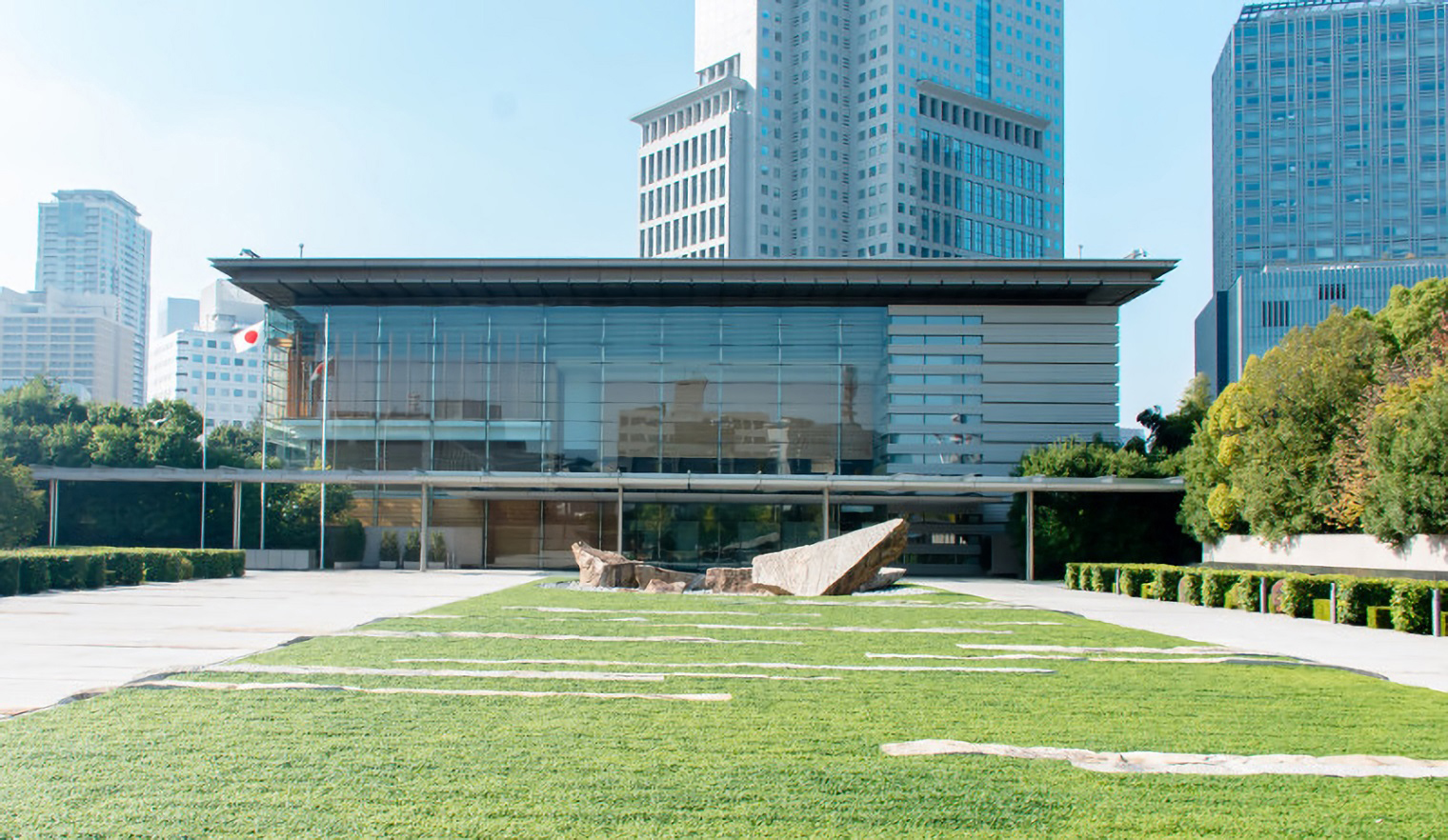
- National Diet Building Liberal Democrats HQ Sanno Park Tower Vertical Datum of Japan Prime Minister's Office
- Interactive map of Nagatachō

Population (2024)
  - Total: 539
- Postal code: 100-0014

Nagatachō (永田町, Nagata-chō) is a district of Tokyo, Japan, located in Chiyoda Ward. It is the location of the Diet of Japan and the Prime Minister's residence (Kantei). The Supreme Court of Japan is located in neighboring Hayabusachō. Nagatachō is often used to refer to the elected Japanese government, while Kasumigaseki refers to the Japanese civil service.

== Landmarks ==
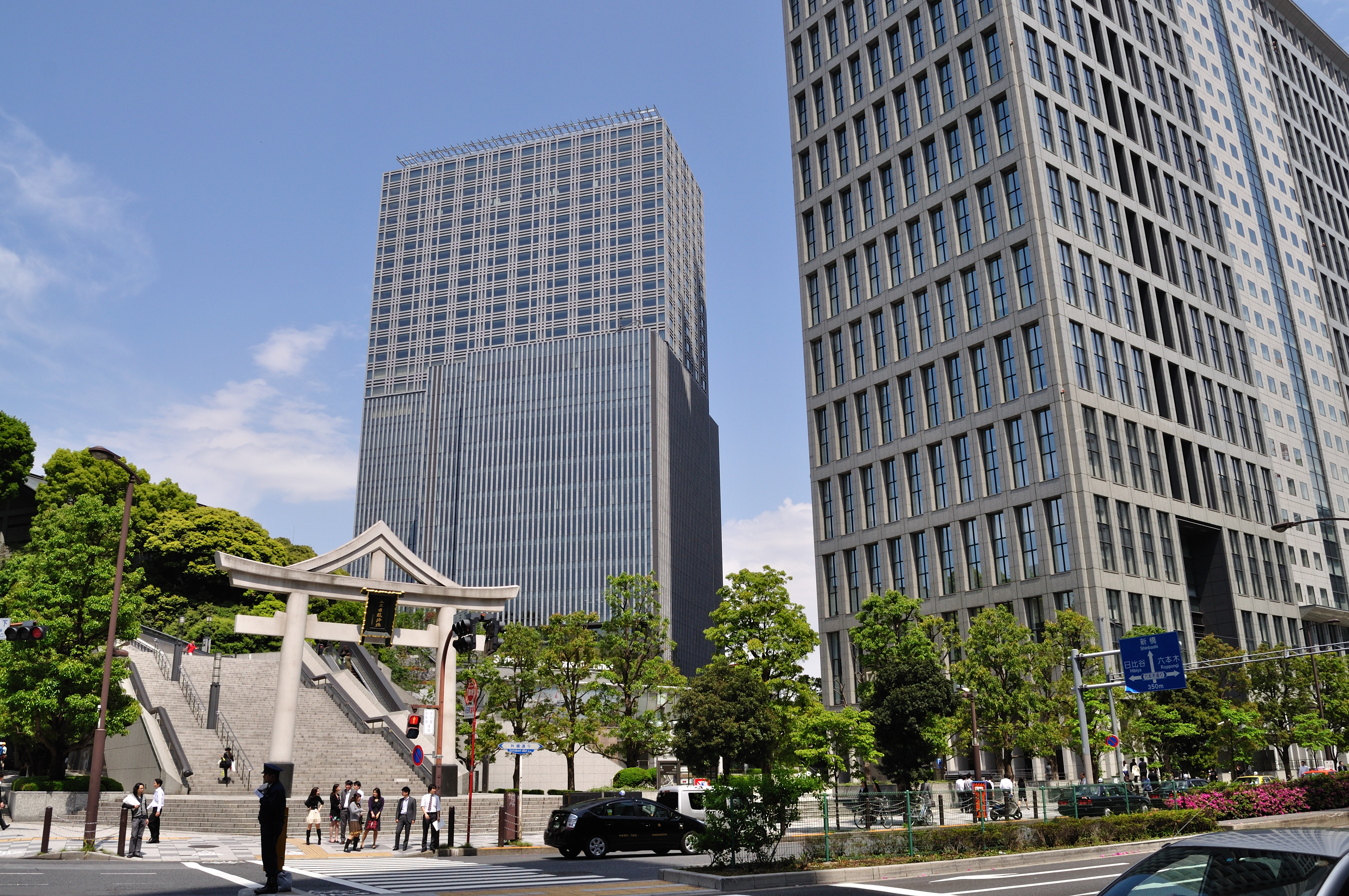
Hie Shrine

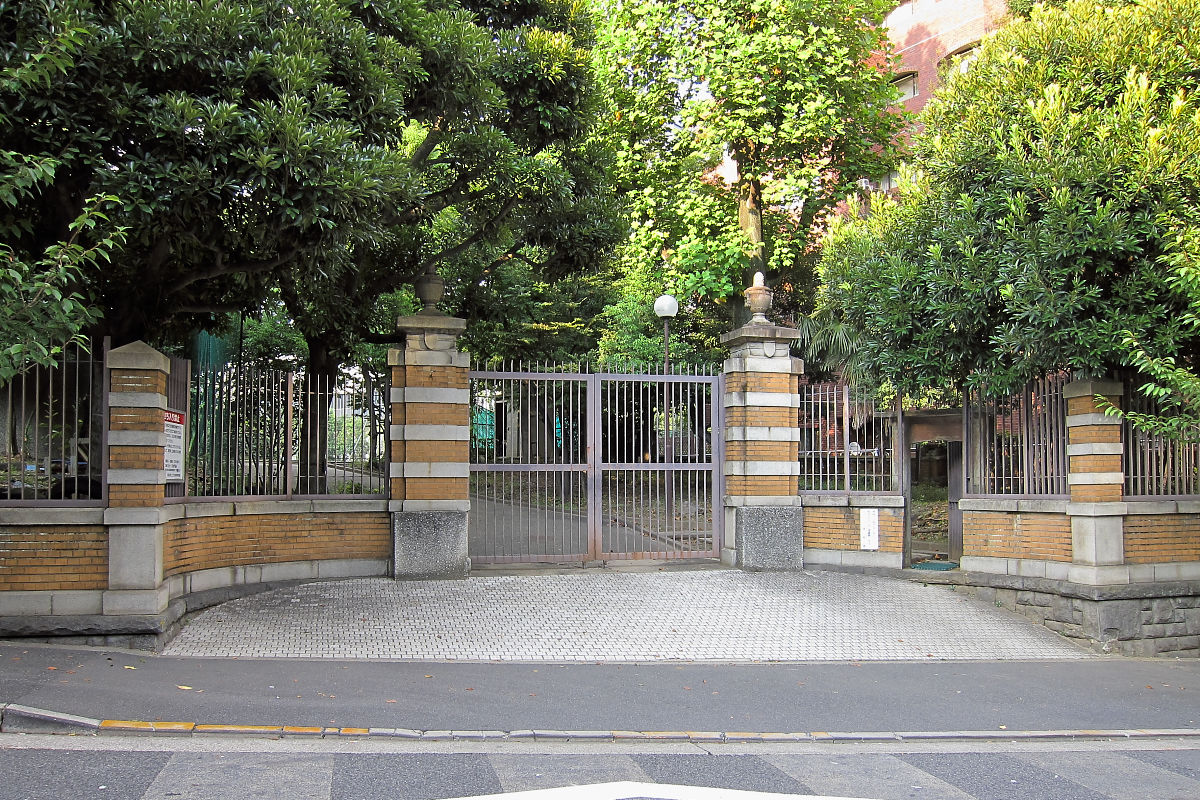
Hibiya high school

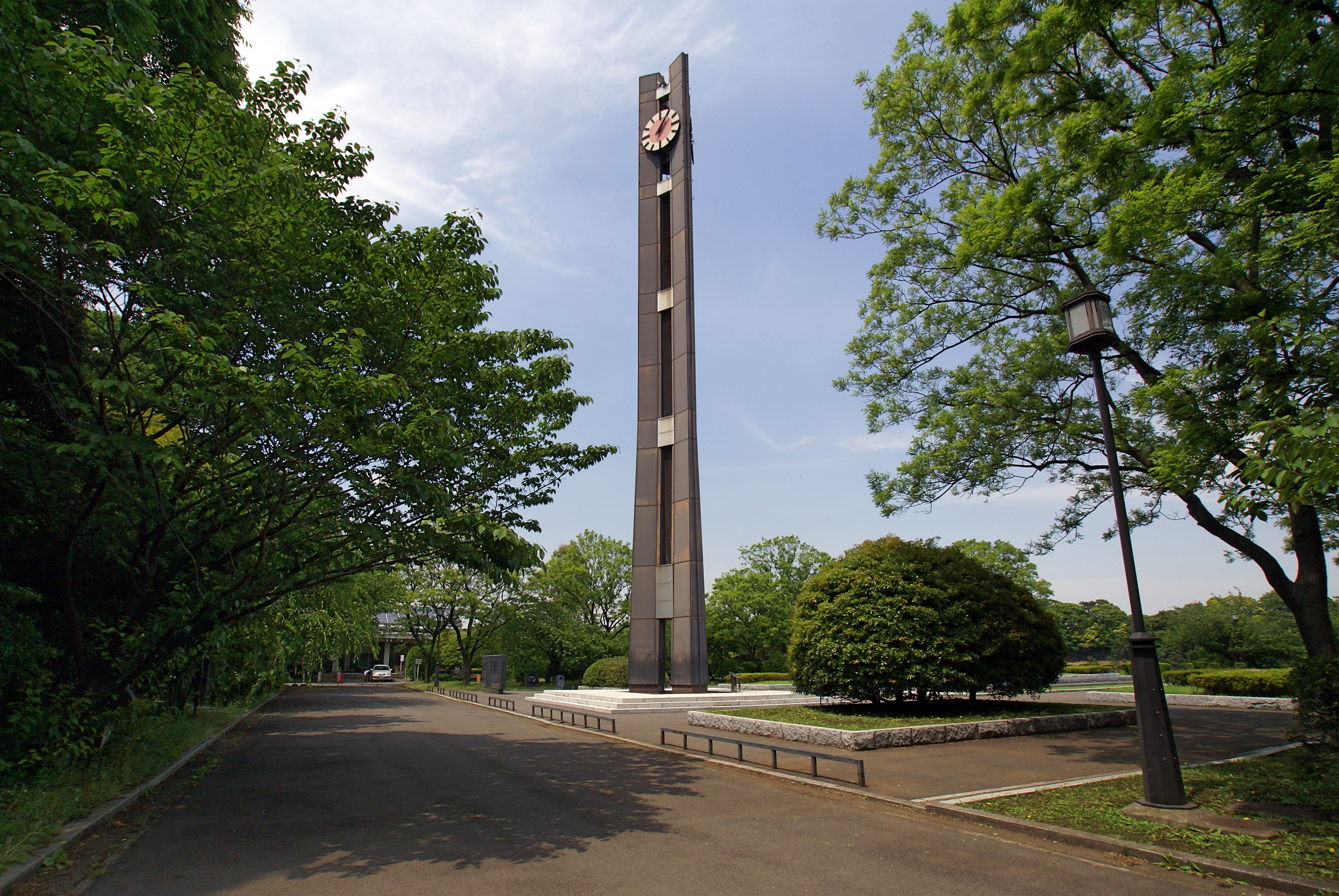
Parliamentary Park (Kokkai Zentei, 国会前庭)

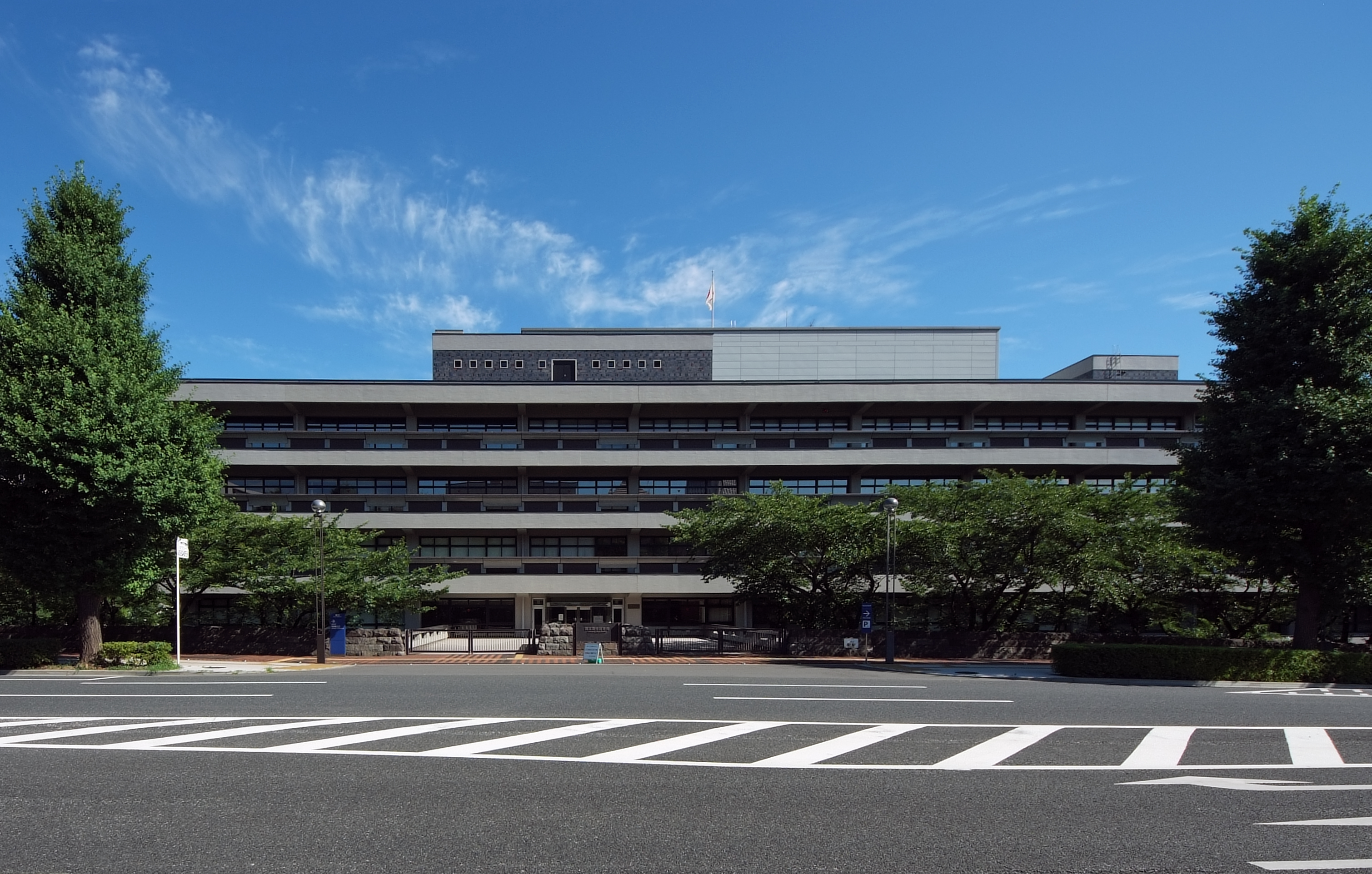
National Diet Library
- National Diet Building
- National Diet Library
- Parliamentary Museum
- Cabinet Office
- Headquarters of the Liberal Democratic Party (Japan)
- Hie Shrine
- Hibiya High School

== Subway stations ==
- Akasaka-mitsuke Station (Ginza Line, Marunouchi Line)
- Kokkai-gijidō-mae Station (Chiyoda Line, Marunouchi Line)
- Nagatachō Station (Hanzōmon Line, Namboku Line, Yūrakuchō Line)
- Tameike-Sannō Station (Ginza Line, Namboku Line)

== Education ==
Chiyoda Board of Education operates public elementary and junior high schools. Kōjimachi Elementary School (麹町小学校) is the zoned elementary of Nagatcho 1-2 chōme. Kōjimachi Elementary was formed from the merger of the former Kōjimachi Elementary and Nagatachō Elementary School (永田町小学校). It began holding classes, in the year 2000, at the former Nagatachō Elementary facility. Its current building opened on April 1, 2003.

There is a freedom of choice system for junior high schools in Chiyoda Ward, and so there are no specific junior high school attendance zones.

== See also ==
- Sannō Matsuri
- Rosanjin
- February 26 Incident
- New Sanno Hotel
