= Hie Shrine =

Shinto shrine in Chiyoda, Tokyo, Japan

Hie Shrine 日枝神社
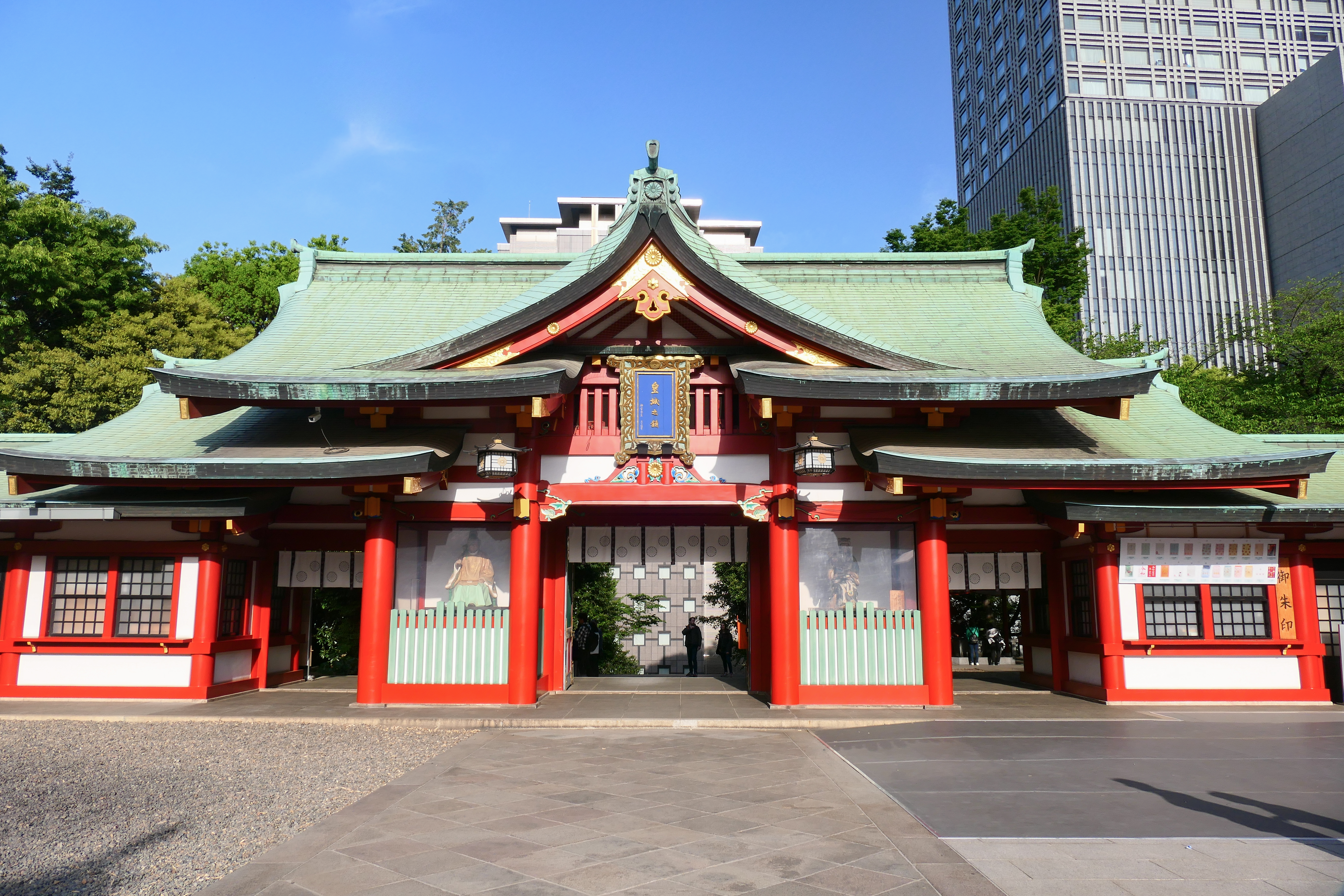

- Location within Japan

Religion
- Affiliation: Shinto
- Deity: Oyamakui no Kami

Location
- Location: 2-10-5, Nagatachō; Chiyoda, Tokyo 100-0014
- Interactive map of Hie Shrine 日枝神社
- Coordinates: 35°40′29″N 139°44′22.50″E

Architecture
- Founder: Ōta Dōkan
- Established: 1478

Website
- www.hiejinja.net/jinja/english/index.html

The Hie Shrine (日枝神社, Hie Jinja) is a Shinto shrine in Nagatachō, Chiyoda, Tokyo, Japan. Its June 15 Sannō Matsuri is one of the three great Japanese festivals of Edo (the forerunner of Tokyo). Other names for the shrine include Hiyoshi Sannō-sha, Hiyoshi Sannō Daigongen-sha, Edo Sannō Daigongen, Kōjimachi Sannō, Sannō-sha, and Sannō-sama.

The main god of the shrine is Oyamakui no Kami.

== History ==
The date of establishment of the Hie Shrine is uncertain. According to one theory, Ōta Dōkan established it in 1478. Another theory identifies the Hie with the Sannō Shrine mentioned in a 1362 record of the Kumano Nachi Taisha.

Tokugawa Ieyasu relocated it to the grounds of Edo Castle, and in 1604 his son Tokugawa Hidetada moved it out, so the people of Edo could worship there. The shaden was lost to the Great Fire of Meireki of 1657, and in 1659 Tokugawa Ietsuna rebuilt it at its present location. The shrine stands southwest of the castle, in the ura kimon direction according to onmyōdō.

From 1871 through 1946, the Hie Shrine was officially designated one of the Kanpei-taisha (官幣大社), meaning that it stood in the first rank of government supported shrines.

The shaden was lost again to the bombing of Tokyo during World War II. The present structure dates from 1958.

The Hie Shrine possesses one National Treasure, a tachi (single-edged sword). It also holds 14 Important Cultural Assets, 13 swords and one naginata. The shrine is also one of the most popular for Japanese families to visit during the Shichi-Go-San coming-of-age festival.

Tameike-Sannō Station on the Tokyo Metro Ginza Line and Tokyo Metro Namboku Line, Kokkai-gijidō-mae Station on the Tokyo Metro Marunouchi Line and Tokyo Metro Chiyoda Line, and Akasaka-mitsuke Station on the Tokyo Metro Ginza Line and Tokyo Metro Marunouchi Line are the closest stops to the shrine.

The shrine has escalators to help people climb up the tall hill it is located on. It also has a large series of Torii similar to those of Fushimi Inari Taisha.

== Gallery ==
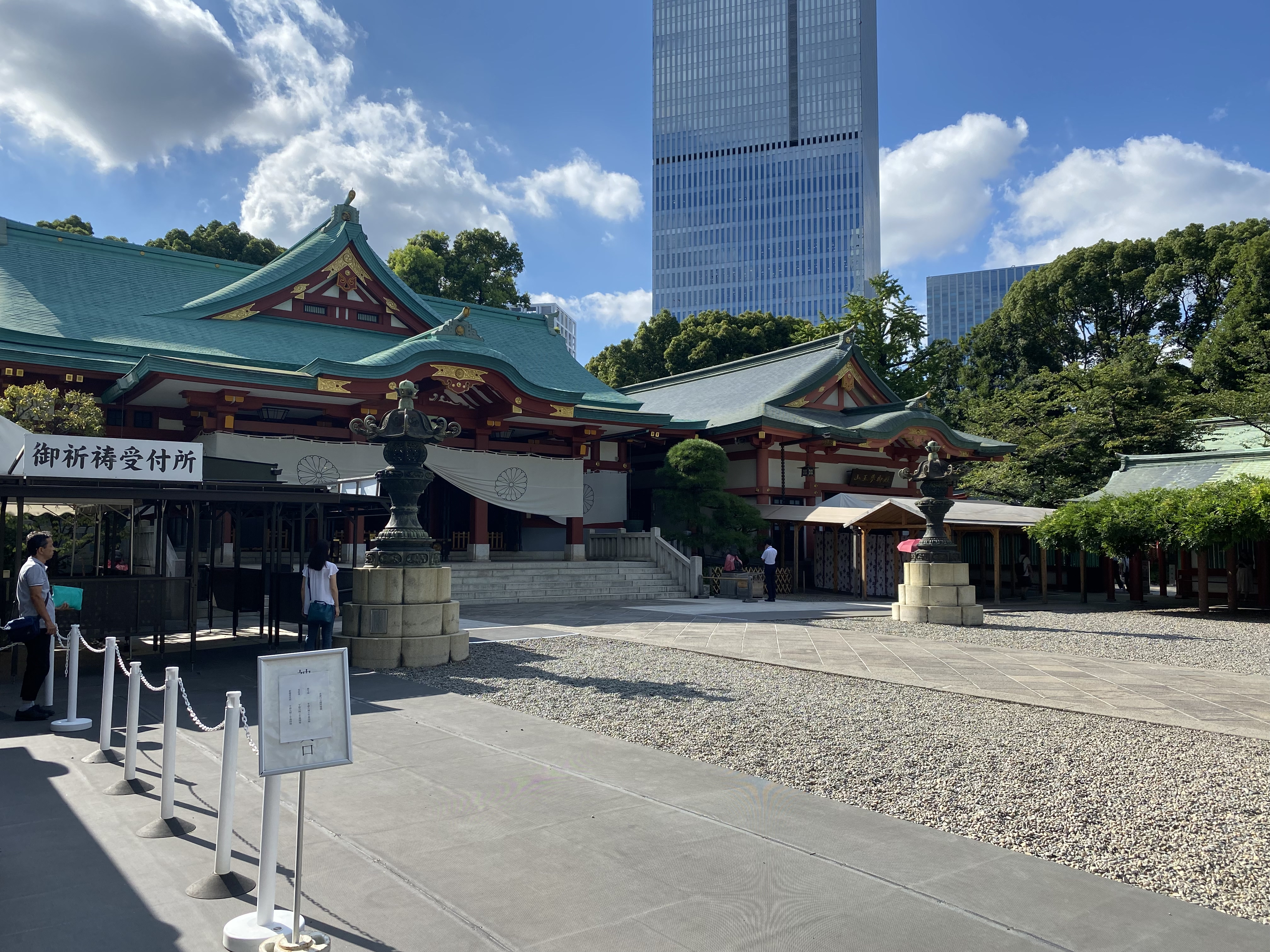
Honden

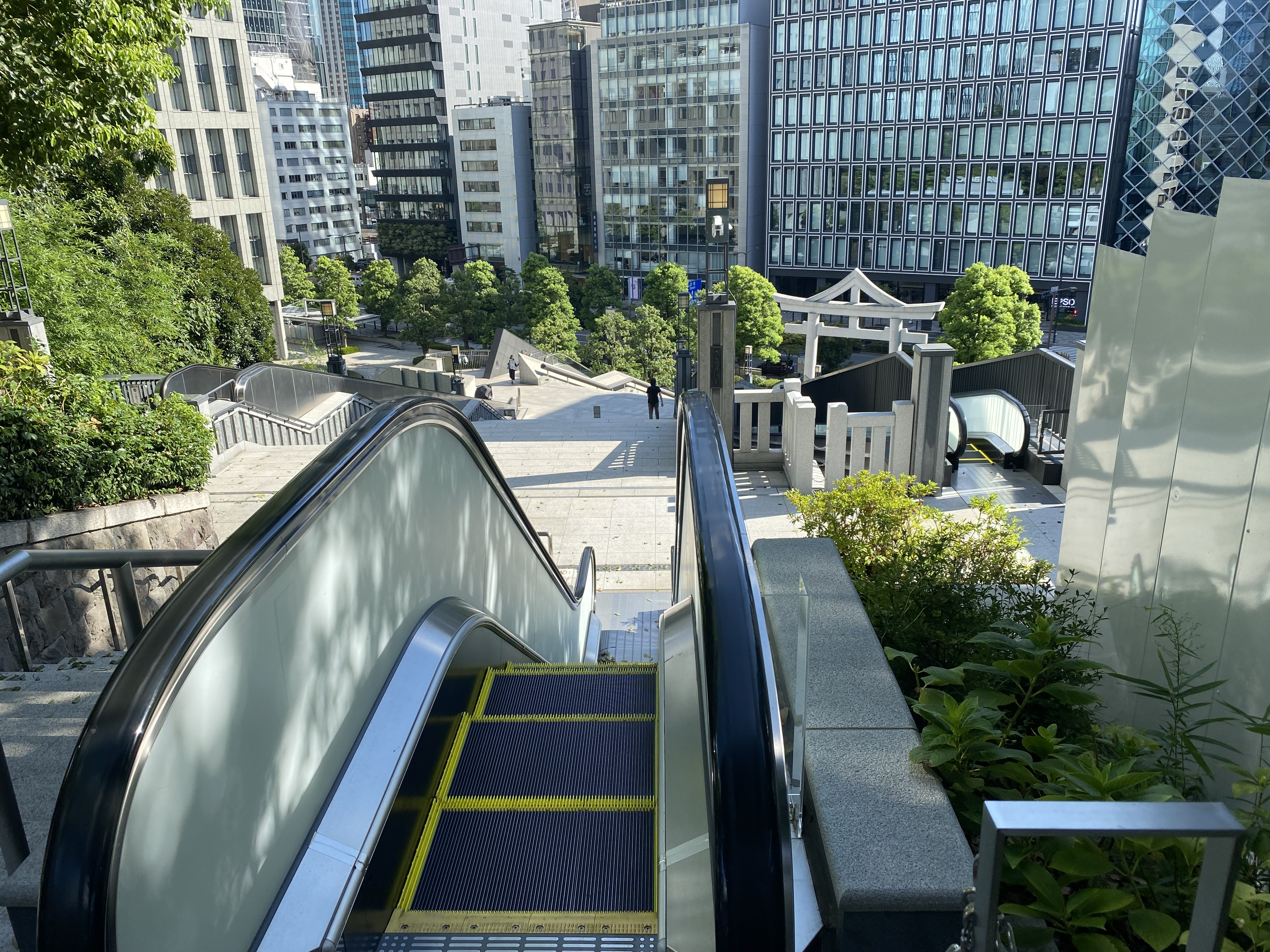
Escalators from the top

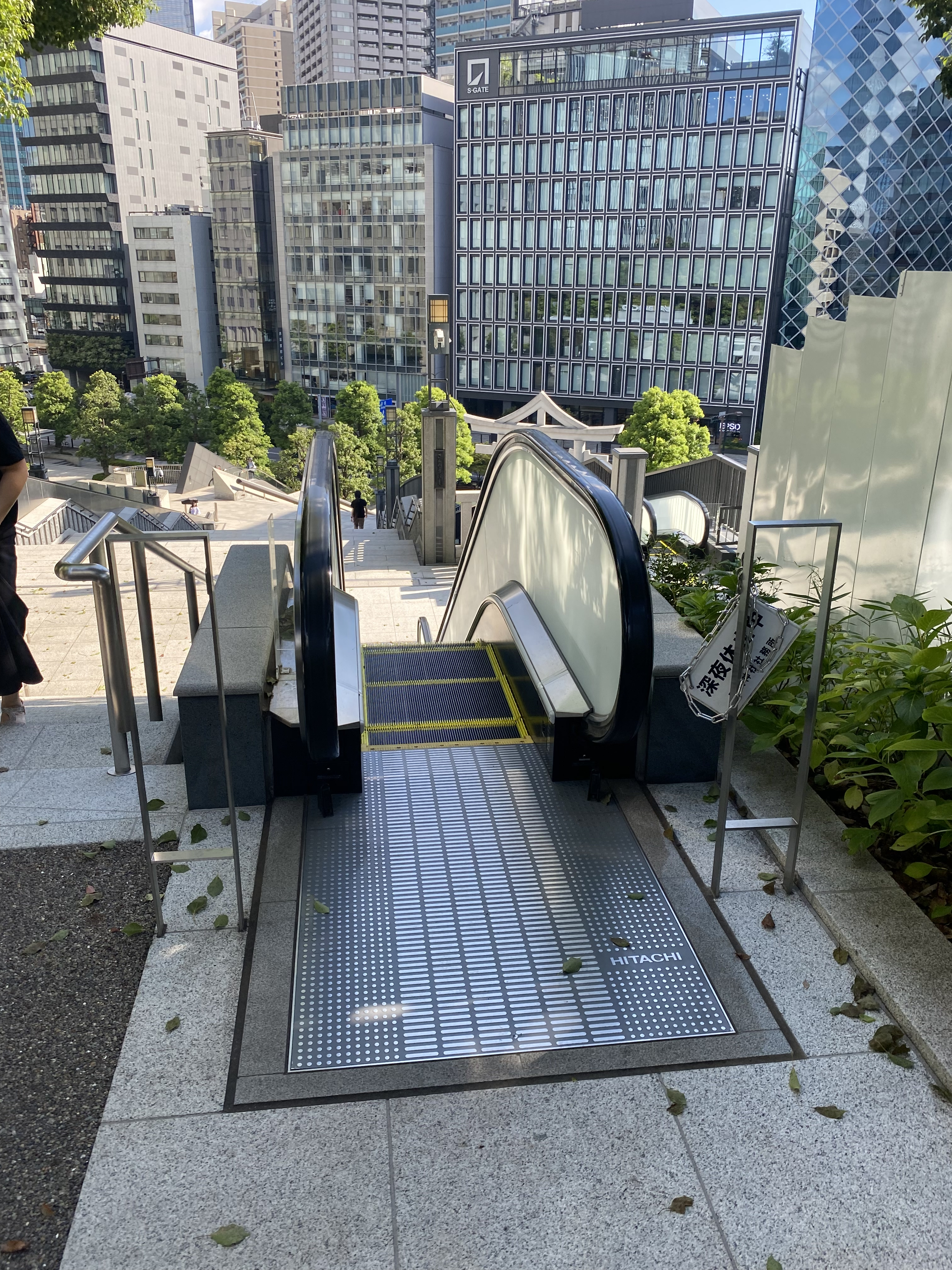
Escalators from the top

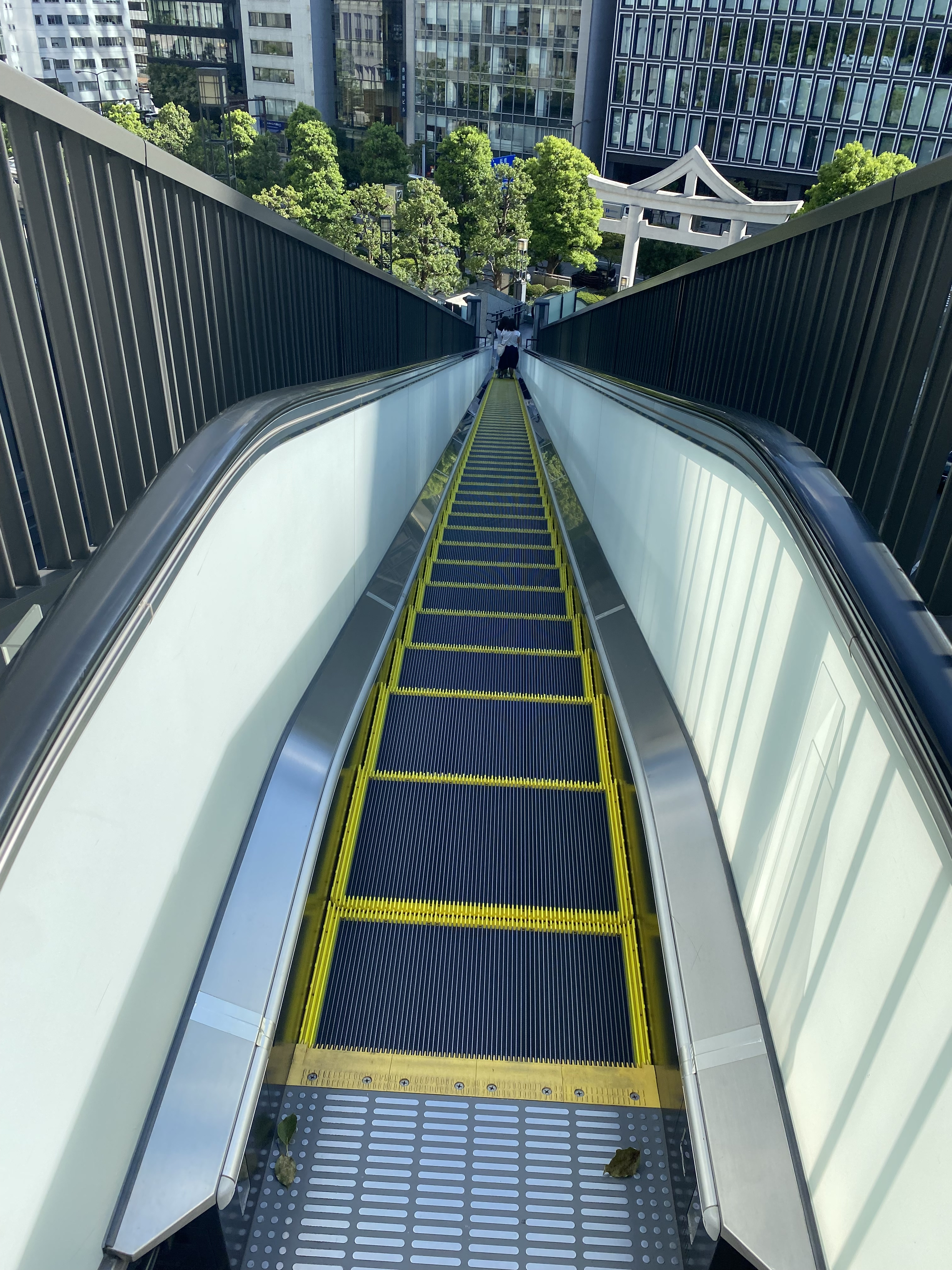
Escalators from the top

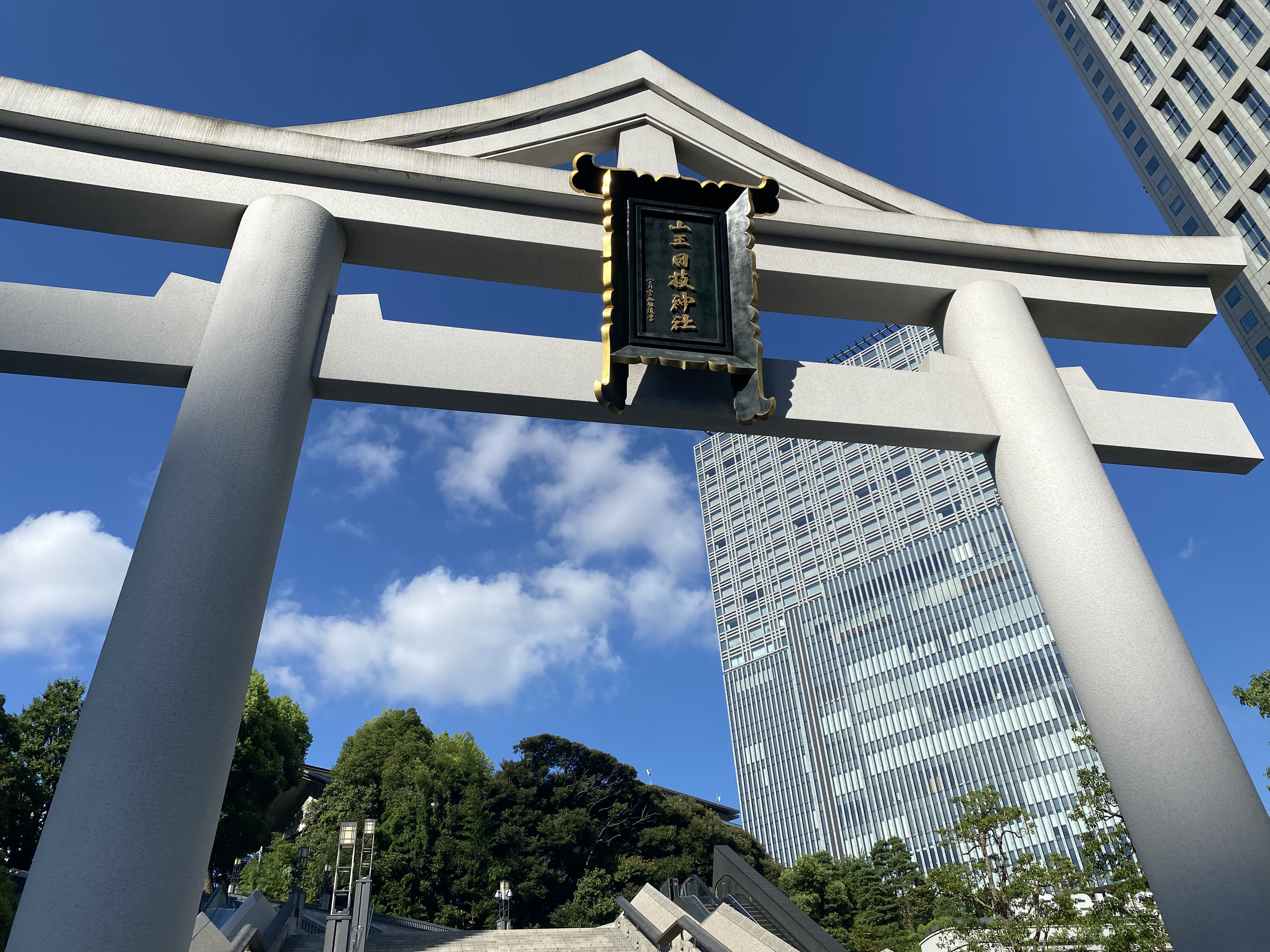
View of escalators through a big torii

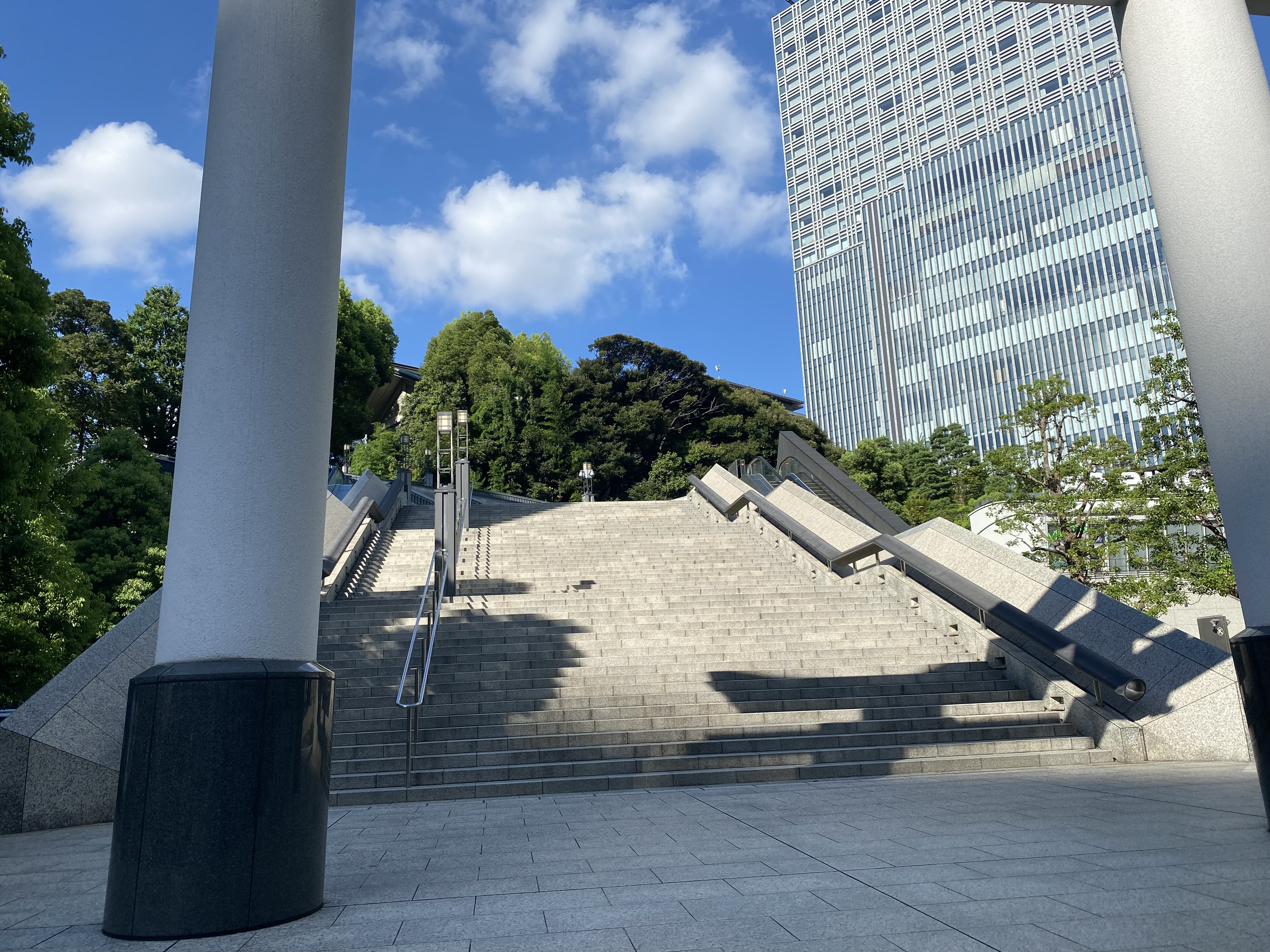
View of escalators through a big torii

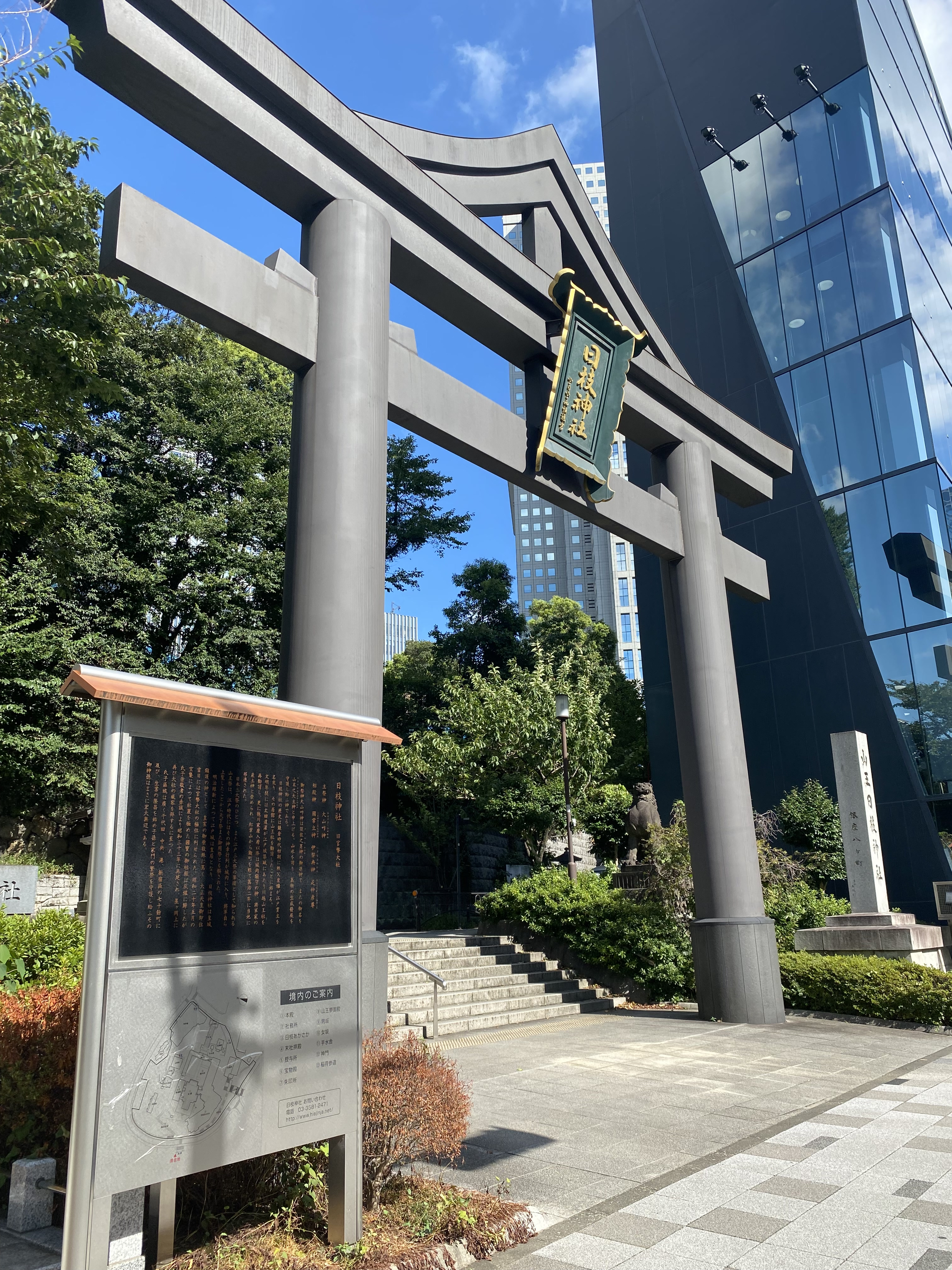
Big Torii

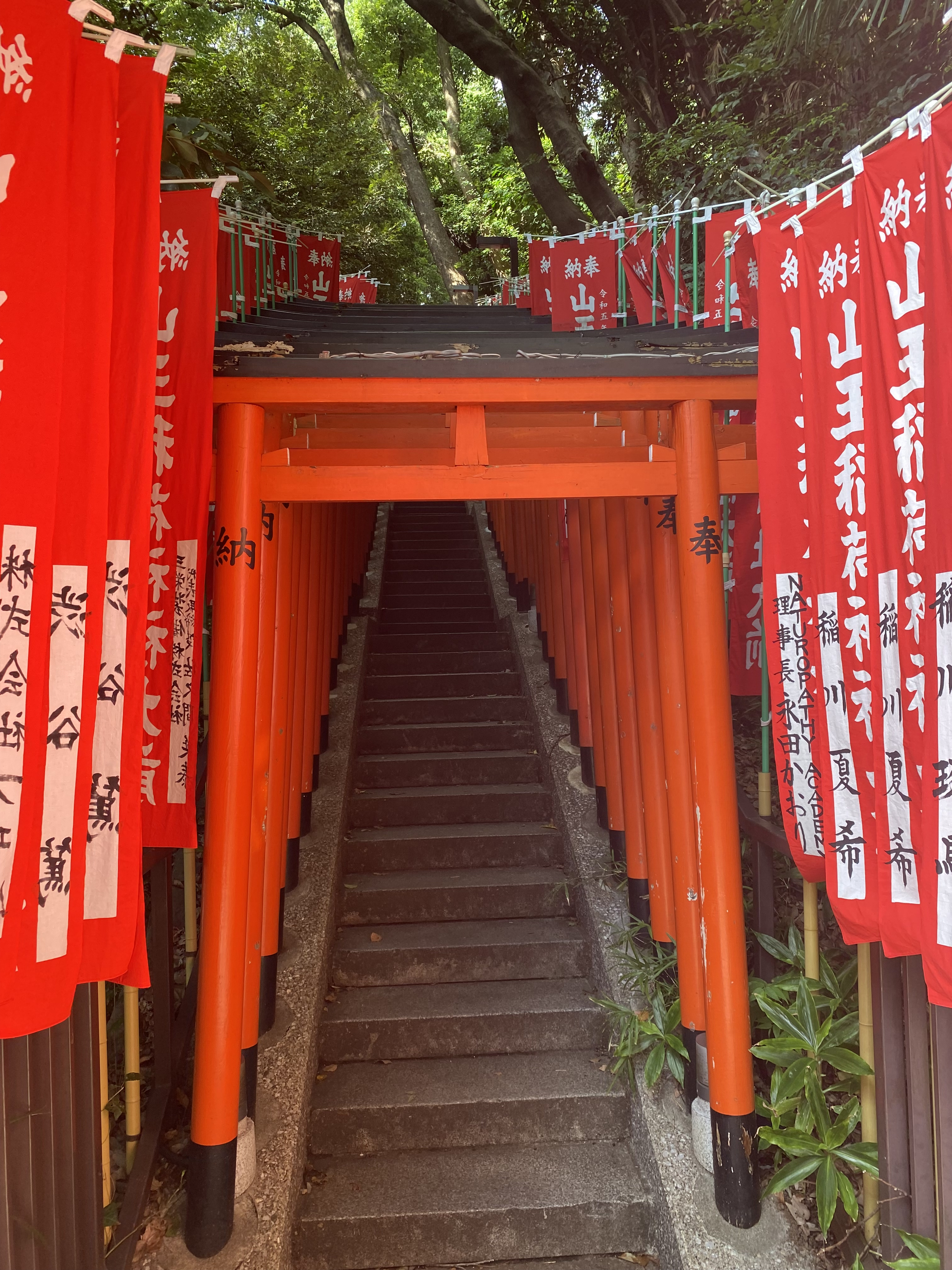
Torii Row

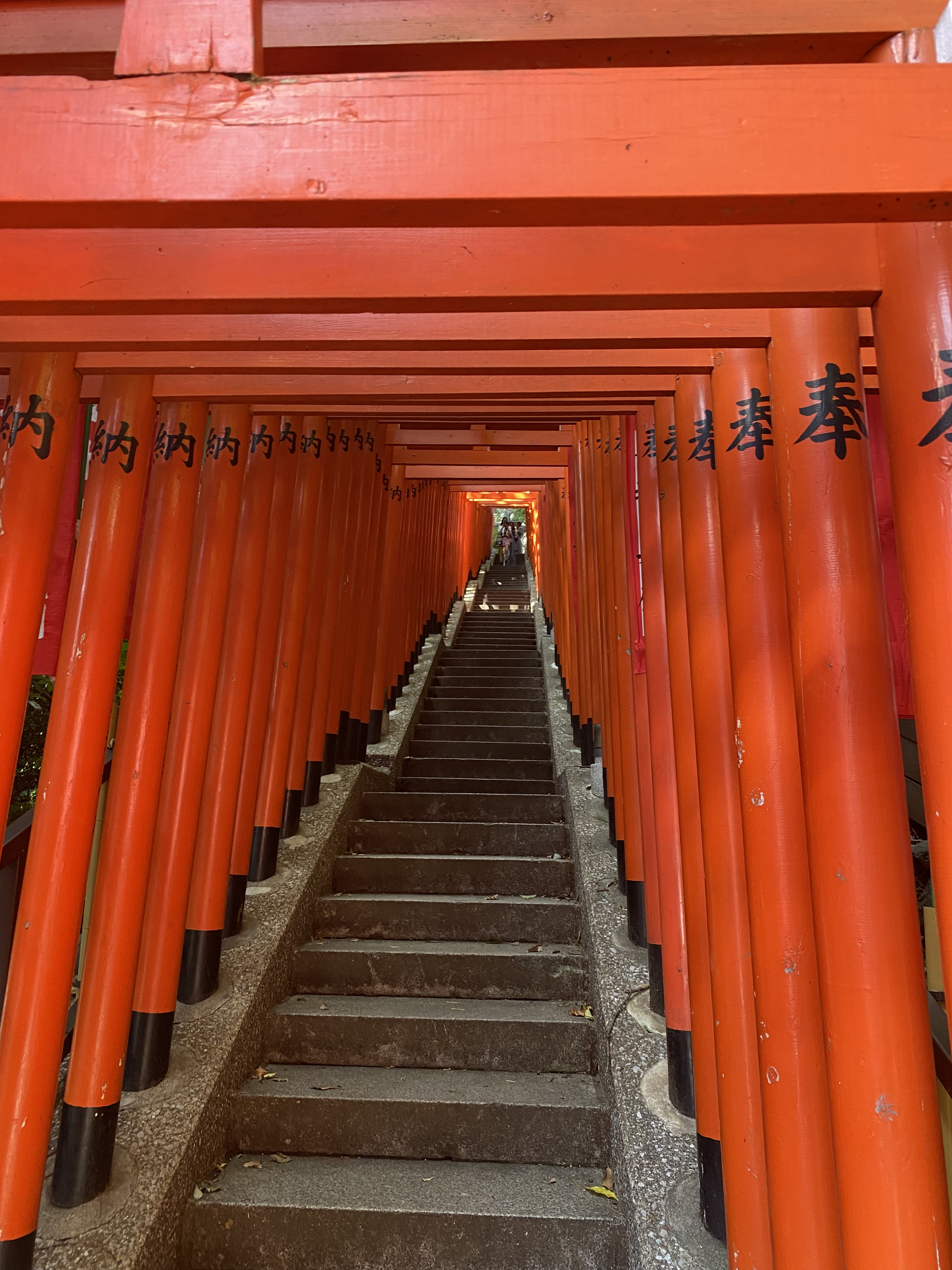
Torii Row

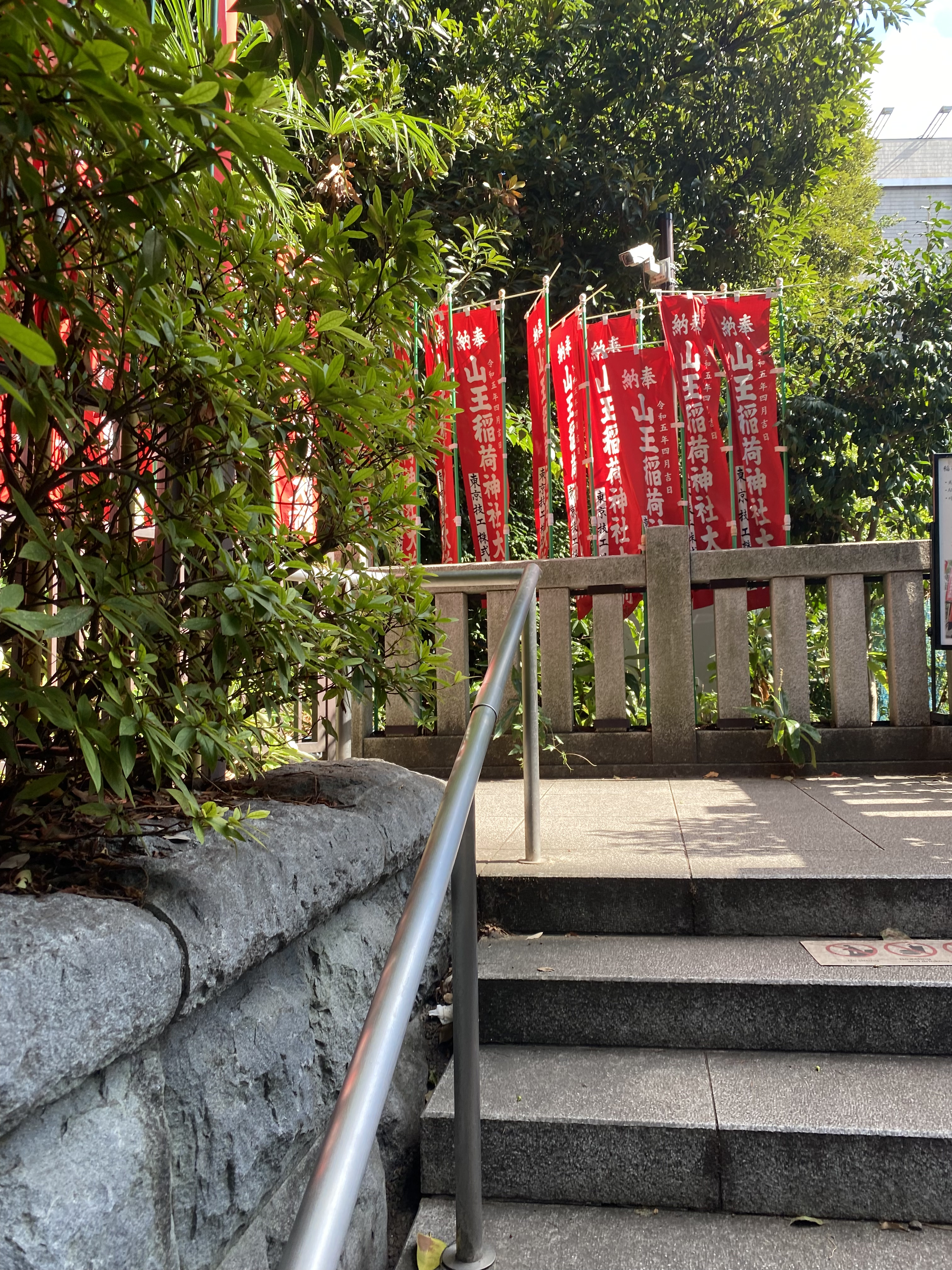

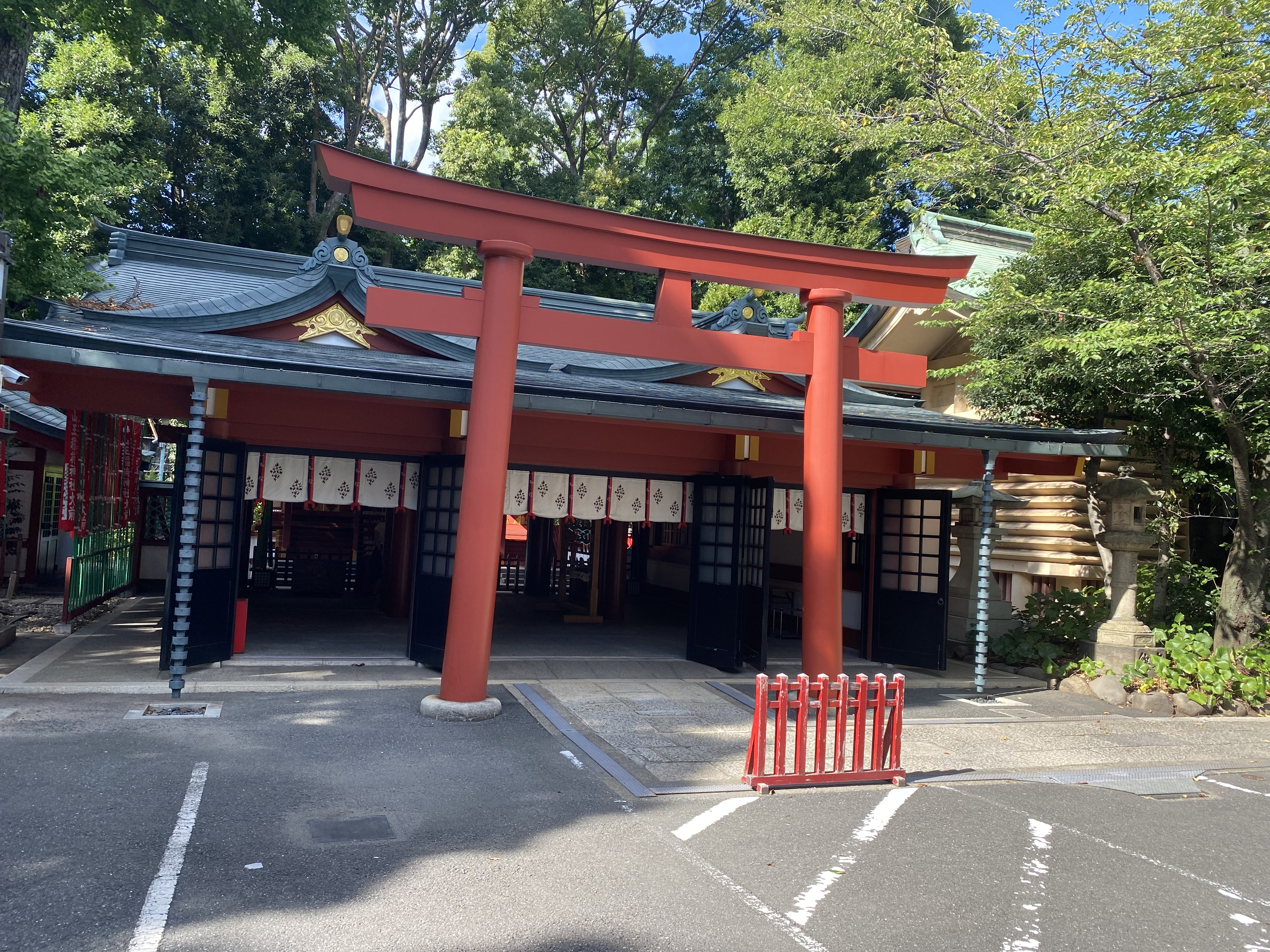

== See also ==
- List of National Treasures of Japan (crafts: swords)
