= Hirakawachō =

District of Chiyoda, Tokyo, Japan

Coordinates: 35°40′57″N 139°44′26″E

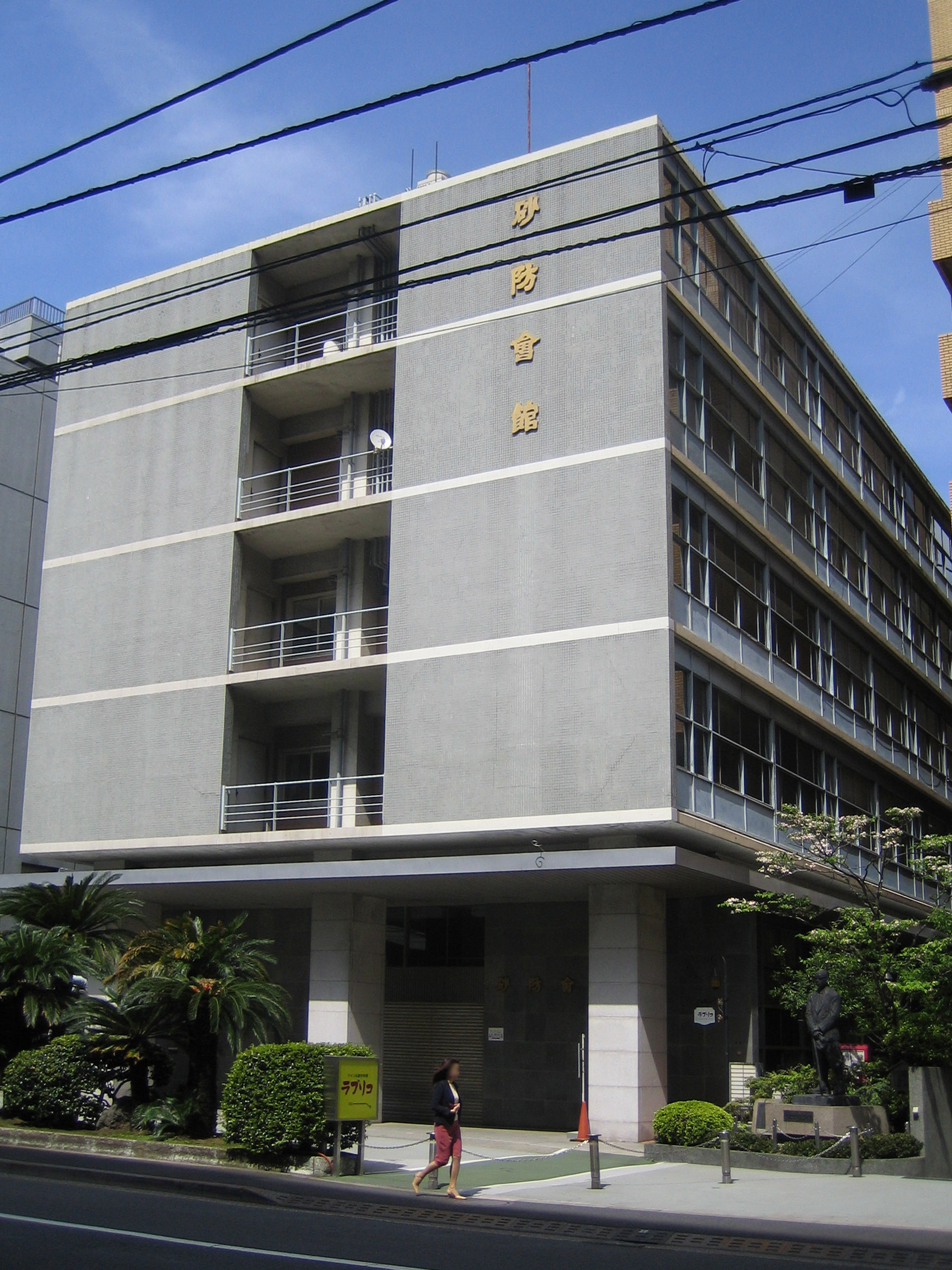
Sabo Kaikan (main hall) in Hirakawachō 2-chōme

Hirakawachō (平河町, Hirakawa-chō) is a district of Chiyoda, Tokyo, Japan, consisting of 1-chōme and 2-chōme. As of March 1, 2025, its population is 2,060 (1,154 households). Hirakawachō's postal code is 102-0093.

Note: Kanda-Hirakawachō, also located in the Chiyoda ward, is a completely different district situated on the opposite side of the Imperial Palace.

Hirakawachō is located in the western part of the Chiyoda ward. It borders Kōjimachi to the north, Hayabusachō to the east, Nagatachō to the south, and Kioichō to the west. The Tokyo FM-Dōri Avenue forms its northern boundary, the Aoyama-Dōri Avenue (Japan National Route 246) forms its southern boundary, and the Prince-Dōri Avenue forms its western boundary. The district is characterized by many office buildings and association halls.

== History ==
The name Hirakawa (平川) originally referred to a central settlement near the lower reaches of the old Kanda River (around present-day Hitotsubashi and Ōtemachi), known as Hirakawa Village. After the Great Fire of Meireki in 1657, Hirakawa Village was relocated to the current area and renamed Hirakawachō, divided into 1-chōme through 3-chōme.

- Hirakawa Tenman-gū: The shrine, originally founded by Ōta Dōkan in 1478, was first located inside Edo Castle. It was moved outside the Hirakawa-gomon gate as part of the Edo Castle expansion by Tokugawa Ieyasu and was finally relocated to its current site in 1607.
- Modern Reorganization:
- In 1869 (Meiji 2), Kōjimachi Ryūganji Monzen was renamed Moto-Hirakawachō.
- In 1911 (Meiji 44), the prefix "Kōjimachi" was dropped from Kōjimachi-Hirakawachō 1-chōme through 3-chōme.
- In 1934 (Shōwa 9), Moto-Hirakawachō and the original Hirakawachō 1-chōme to 3-chōme merged to form the current Hirakawachō 1-chōme. Hirakawachō 4-chōme to 6-chōme were reorganized into the current Hirakawachō 2-chōme.
- In 1971 (Shōwa 46) July 1, the current residential addressing system ($Jūkyo\ Hyōji$) was implemented.

== Transportation ==
The Kaizaka-Dōri Avenue runs roughly through the center of the district. The Shuto Expressway Route 4 is located upon the Aoyama-Dōri Avenue.

- Subway Stations:
  - An exit of the Nagatachō Station (Tokyo Metro Yūrakuchō Line, Hanzōmon Line, Namboku Line) is situated on the Aoyama-Dōri Avenue.
  - An exit of the Akasaka-mitsuke Station (Tokyo Metro Ginza Line, Marunouchi Line) is also located on the Aoyama-Dōri Avenue.
  - Kōjimachi Station (Tokyo Metro Yūrakuchō Line) and Hanzōmon Station (Tokyo Metro Hanzōmon Line) are also used by residents in the northern parts of the district.

== Company Headquarters and Facilities ==
Company Headquarters:

- LVMH Moët Hennessy Louis Vuitton SE has its Japanese offices located in 2-1-1 Hirakawachō.
- Nabtesco headquarters located in 2-7-9 Hirakawachō.
- Pegasystems Japan (ペガシステムズ日本法人本社)
- Eurasia Travel Co., Ltd. (ユーラシア旅行社)
- LAC Co., Ltd. (ラック)
- Mirai Construction Co., Ltd. (みらい建設工業)
- Major Facilities:
- Sabo Kaikan (砂防会館)
- Zenkōren Building (全共連ビル) (houses the Embassy of South Africa)
- Tōdōfuken Kaikan (都道府県会館 - Prefectural Hall)
- Nihon Toshi Center Kaikan (日本都市センター会館 - Japan Urban Center Hall)
- Hotel Le Port Kojimachi (ホテルルポール麹町)
- Hirakawachō Mori Tower (平河町森タワー)
- Hirakawa Tenman-gū Shrine (平河天満宮)

== Education ==
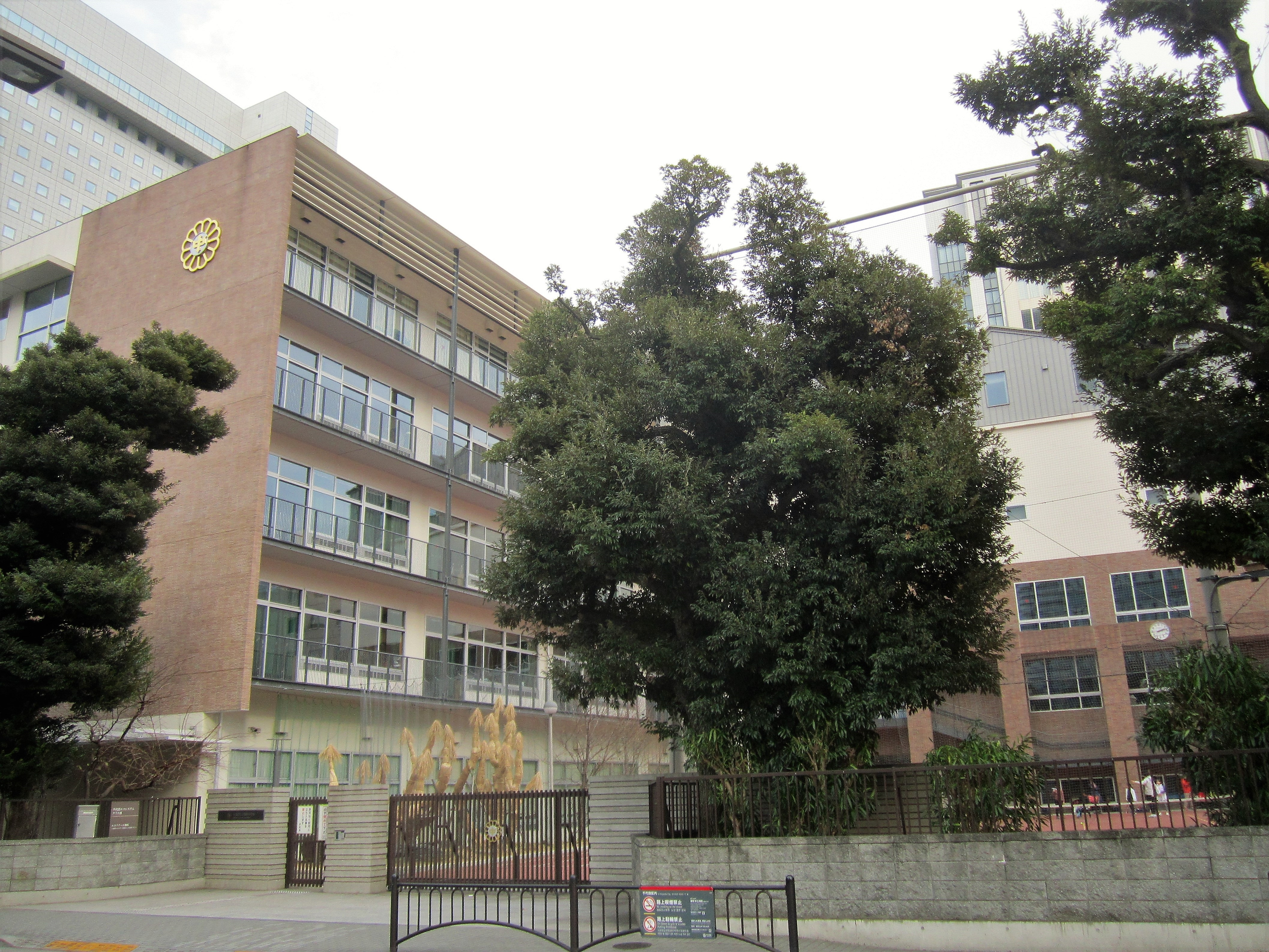
Chiyoda Ward Kojimachi Junior High School (千代田区立麹町中学校)

The Chiyoda Board of Education operates public elementary and junior high schools. Kōjimachi Elementary School (麹町小学校) is the zoned elementary school for Hirakawachō 1- and 2-chōme.

Chiyoda Ward employs a freedom of choice system for junior high schools, allowing students to select a school within the ward. Chiyoda Ward operates Kojimachi Junior High School (千代田区立麹町中学校) within Hirakawachō (2-5-1 Hirakawachō).
