= Kōjimachi =

Kōjimachi 麹町
- District
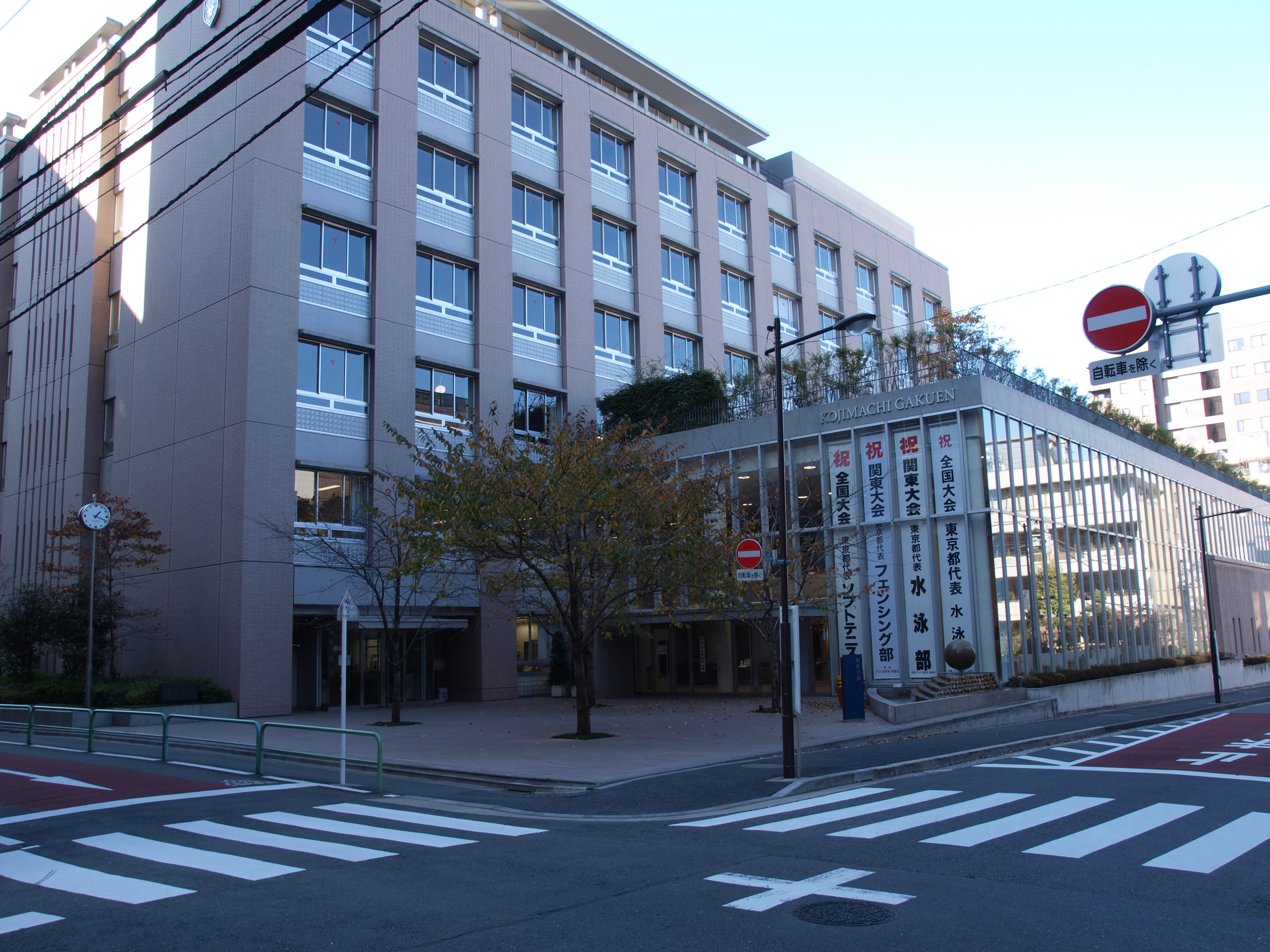
- Kōjimachi Gakuen
- Interactive map of Kōjimachi
- Coordinates: 35°41′4.01″N 139°45′29.79″E
- Country: Japan
- City: Tokyo
- Ward: Chiyoda
- Area: Kōjimachi Area

Population (June 1, 2020)
  - Total: 2,719
- Time zone: UTC+9 (JST)
- Postal code: 102-0083
- Area code: 03

Kōjimachi (麹町 or 麴町) is a district in Chiyoda, Tokyo.

== History ==
Prior to the arrival of Tokugawa Ieyasu, the area was known as Kōjimura (糀村). The area developed as townspeople settled along the Kōshū Kaidō.

In 1878, the Kōjimachi area became Kōjimachi-ku, a ward of the city of Tokyo. In 1934 and 1938, the addressing system along the Koshu-Kaido was reorganized, creating the 6 chomes subdivision for Kōjimachi that are still used.

In 1947, Kōjimachi Ward was merged with Kanda Ward to form the modern special ward of Chiyoda, and the 6 chomes became the Kōjimachi district.

The area centered upon Kōjimachi - including the districts of the Banchō area, Kioichō, Hirakawachō and Hayabusachō - is sometimes referred as the Kōjimachi area (麹町地区), not to be mistaken with Kōjimachi Ward (麹町区).

This place is also known for being the birthplace of Hideki Tojo, general of the Imperial Japanese Army and Prime Minister of Japan during the Second World War.

== Landmarks and headquarters ==
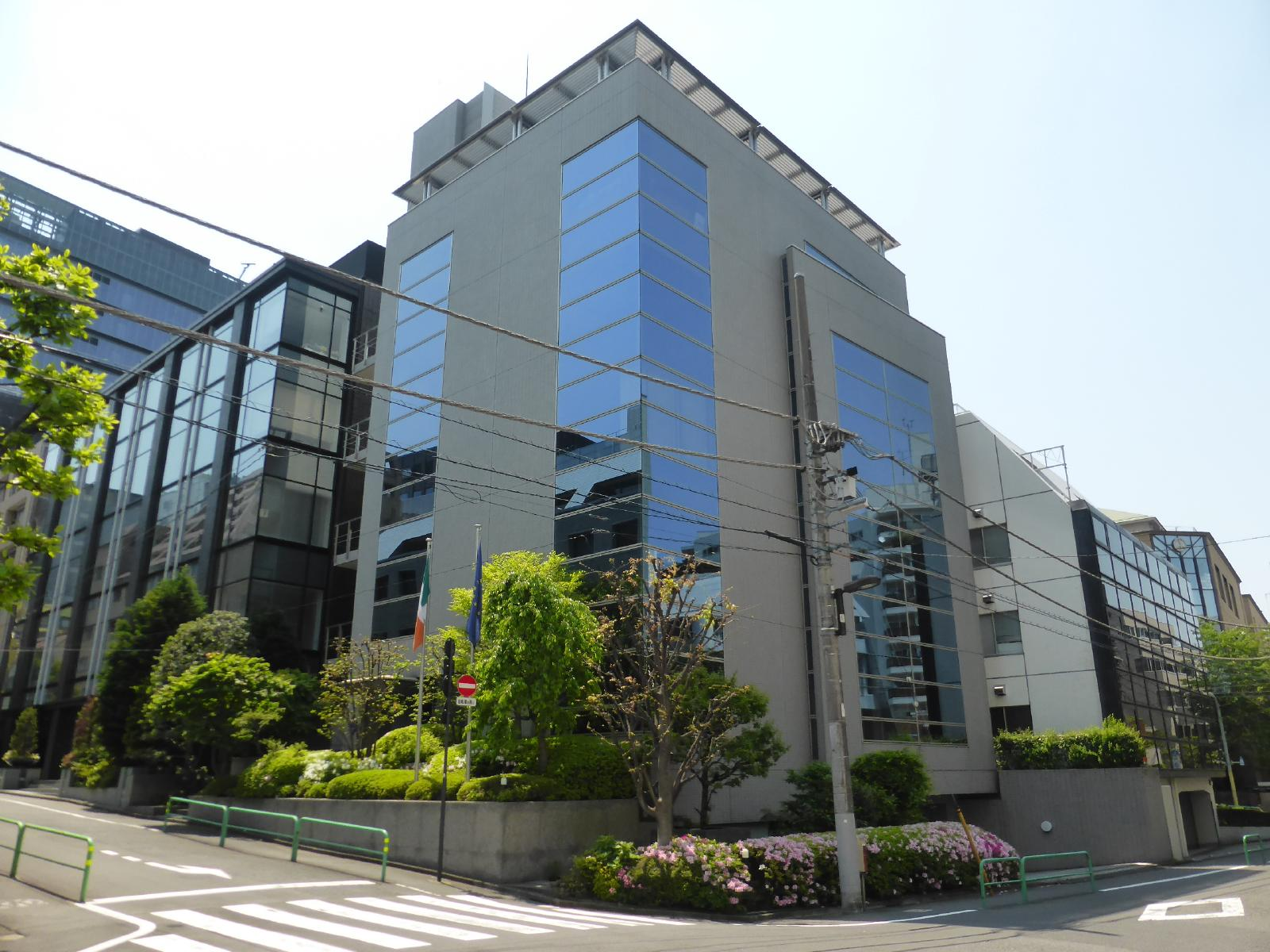
Former Embassy of Ireland in Kōjimachi

- Embassy of Portugal
- Embassy of Ireland, until April 2025
- Embassy of Belgium
- Japan Sun Oil Company, handling the Asian business of Sunoco
- Kōjimachi Gakuen, a girl's junior and senior high school
- Nippon Flour Mills
- Nippon Television had its headquarters here, and maintains studios in the former headquarters building
- Nitto Boseki, a textile and fiberglass products company
- The Japanese subsidiary of SAP
- Tokyo FM
- Tokyo MX
- Hanzōmon Station, Station Z-05 on the Tokyo Metro Hanzomon Line
- Kōjimachi Station, Station Y-15 on the Tokyo Metro Yurakucho Line

== Education ==
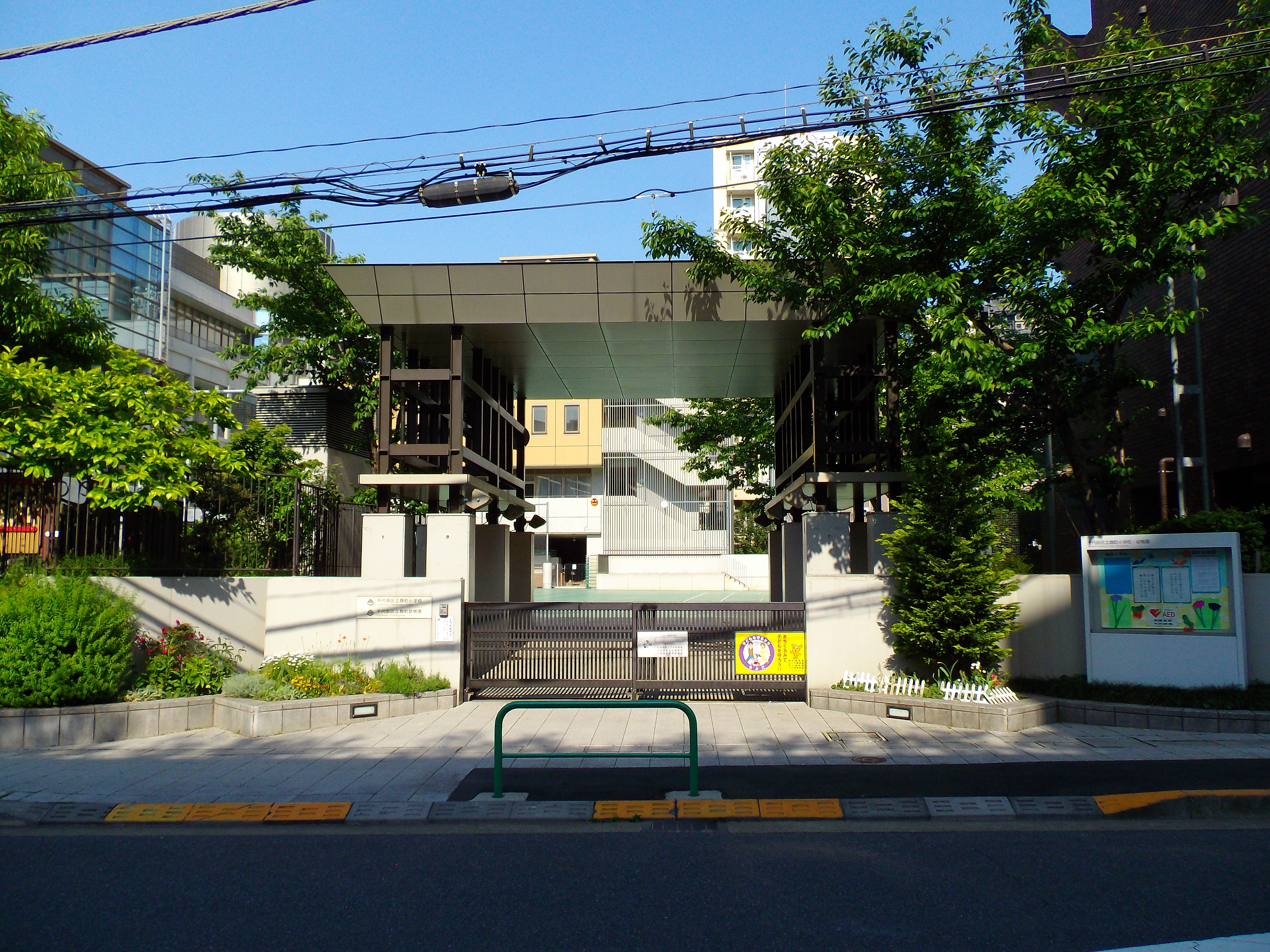
Kōjimachi Elementary School (麹町小学校)

Chiyoda Board of Education operates public elementary and junior high schools. Kōjimachi Elementary School (麹町小学校) is the zoned elementary of Kōjimachi 1-4 chōme. Kōjimachi 5-6 chōme are zoned to Banchō Elementary School (番町小学校) in Rokubanchō. Kōjimachi Elementary was formed from the merger of the former Kōjimachi Elementary and Nagatachō Elementary School (永田町小学校). It began holding classes in the year 2000 at the former Nagatachō Elementary facility. Its current building opened on April 1, 2003.

There is a freedom of choice system for junior high schools in Chiyoda Ward, and so there are no specific junior high school zones. Chiyoda Ward operates Kojimachi Junior High School (麹町中学校) in Hirakawachō.
