= Heenan Blaikie =

1973–2014 Canadian law firm

Heenan Blaikie LLP
- Type: Limited liability partnership
- Industry: Law firm
- Founded: 1973
- Defunct: 2014
- Headquarters: Montreal, Quebec, Canada
- Services: Legal advice
- Website: heenanblaikie.com

Heenan Blaikie LLP was a Canadian law firm. It practised in the areas of business, labour and employment, litigation, taxation, entertainment law and intellectual property law. The firm was founded in 1973 by Roy Heenan, Donald Johnston, and Peter Blaikie.

== Overview ==
Based in Montreal, at one time the firm had over 500 lawyers at offices in Toronto, Ottawa, Calgary, Vancouver, Victoria, Quebec City, Sherbrooke, Trois-Rivières and Paris, with a representative office in Singapore and a satellite office in Los Angeles. As of February 2011, it was the sixth largest law firm in Canada. It became the largest law firm to close in Canadian history after its partners voted to dissolve the firm on 5 February 2014. The firm closed on 28 February 2014.

The firm was involved in Canada's longest lawsuit, related to the bankruptcy of a finance company named Castor Holdings. Widdrington Estate v. Wightman lasted more than 12 years, about 20 times as long as originally predicted. The firm closed shortly after its resolution.

== History ==
The firm was founded in 1973 by Roy Heenan, Donald Johnston, and Peter Blaikie as Johnston Heenan Blaikie. After Johnston left to become a Member of Parliament in 1978, the firm was renamed Heenan Blaikie.

The firm was one of the first to expand across Canada in the 1970s, helping pioneer the concept of national law firms. It also established a reputation as the landing ground for former Prime Ministers: both Jean Chrétien and Pierre Trudeau joined the firm after their respective political careers ended.

The firm had billings of $222 million and a profit of $75 million for 2013, its last full year of operation.

=== Closure ===
At one point the home of over 500 lawyers, the firm began to suffer financial trouble in 2013. Hurt by falling revenues from a drop-off in business from resource companies, the opening of a Paris office at a time the economy was struggling there, and the end of several major cases at the same time, the firm announced a drop in income per partner of 10 to 15 percent. The managing partners suggested two options, either a major downsizing of the firm, or a restructuring that could split up the Montreal and Toronto offices. One week later, the firm faced a rash of defections, with nearly 30 senior partners exiting for more profitable firms.

While the firm was still profitable, Heenan suggested the loss of trust as the problem as the firm was recently torn apart by "infighting and clashing visions". After Heenan retired as chairman in 2012, a successor was not chosen to keep the firm unified and tensions between the Montreal and Toronto offices grew.

The firm's partners voted on February 5, 2014, to start the orderly dissolution of the firm. It was the largest law firm dissolution in Canadian history, surpassing the previous record set by Goodman and Carr in 2007. On February 28, 2014, the firm closed, leaving a skeleton crew of support staff to wind down the firm's operations over the next few months.

== Work ==
At the international level, Heenan Blaikie was counsel to the Canadian Employers Council, an organisation that represents Canadian employers at the International Labour Organization (ILO). Heenan Blaikie was also the Canadian member of the National Workers' Compensation Defense Network (NWCDN), an organization of independent law firms in the United States and Canada with an established workers' compensation practice and experience in defending employers and insurance companies in workers' compensation and related actions.

In addition to its European and Asian presence, its Paris office served as a foray into the African market. However, the firm's activities in Africa garnered controversy, as its endeavours there included a working relationship with Ari Ben-Menashe, from whom the firm tried to distance itself. According to Jean-Francois Mercadier, "partners started to lose any kind of faith in the management of the firm", which resulted in the company's collapse.

== Past notable lawyers and alumni ==
- Pierre Elliott Trudeau, 15th Prime Minister of Canada
- Jean Chrétien, 20th Prime Minister of Canada
- Michel Bastarache, Justice of the Supreme Court of Canada; counsel with Caza Saikaley LLP in Ottawa, Ontario
- Clement Gascon, Justice of the Supreme Court of Canada
- Donald J. Johnston, co-founder of the firm; Secretary-General of the Paris-based Organisation for Economic Co-operation and Development
- David Stratas, Justice of the Federal Court of Appeal
- Marcel Aubut, president of the Canadian Olympic Committee
- André Bureau, chair of the Canadian Radio-television and Telecommunications Commission; chair of Astral Media
- Pierre-Marc Johnson, 24th Premier of Quebec
- Erin O'Toole, Leader of the Official Opposition (Canada); leader of the Conservative Party of Canada.

== See also ==
- Holden Day Wilson
