= Nippon Flour Mills =

Japanese food company

Nippn Corporation
- Logo used until 2020
- Native name: 株式会社ニップン
- Romanized name: Kabushiki gaisha Nippun
- Formerly: Nippon Flour Mills Co., Ltd. (1896–2020)
- Company type: Public KK
- Traded as: TYO: 2001
- ISIN: JP3723000000
- Industry: Food
- Founded: 26 September 1896; 129 years ago
- Founder: Hidejiro Naito; Kanekichi Hayashi
- Headquarters: Kōjimachi, Chiyoda-ku, Tokyo 102-0083, Japan
- Area served: Worldwide
- Key people: Hiroshi Sawada (Chairman and CEO); Masayuki Kondo (President and COO)
- Products: Wheat flour; Wheat bran; Rice flour; Frozen foods; Snack foods
- Revenue: ▲JPY 323.4 billion (FY 2017) (US$ 3.05 billion) (FY 2017)
- Net income: ▼JPY 7.6 billion (FY 2017) (US$ 72.1 million) (FY 2017)
- Number of employees: 3,700 (consolidated, as of March 31, 2018)
- Parent: Mitsui Group
- Website: Official website

Nippn Corporation (株式会社ニップン, Kabushiki gaisha Nippun; formerly the Nippon Flour Mills Co., Ltd.)is a Japanese company which derives most of its revenue from milling flour and produces flour related products such as noodles. It was established in 1896 and is a member of the Mitsui keiretsu.

Nippon Flour Mills (NFM) and its group companies engage in a wide range of food businesses that include flour milling, the core business of NFM; food business consisting of manufacture and sale of food ingredients, processed foods, Nakashoku (meal solutions), frozen foods; manufacture and sale of health foods, cosmetics and pet foods; and other businesses including management of sports facilities and bioscience business.
