= Nitto Boseki =

Fibreglass and textile manufacturer in Tokyo, Japan

Nitto Boseki Co., Ltd.
- Native name: 日東紡績株式会社
- Company type: Public KK
- Traded as: TYO: 3110
- Industry: Textile
- Founded: (April 1918; 108 years ago)
- Headquarters: 2-4-1, Kojimachi, Chiyoda-ku, Tokyo 102-8489, Japan
- Key people: Katsumi Minamizono (President and Chairman of the board); Yoshitada Shiratori (CEO)
- Products: Textile products; Glass fiber products; Rock wool and building materials; Speciality chemicals; Medical products
- Revenue: ▲US$ 826 million (FY 2013) (JPY 85.1 billion) (FY 2013)
- Net income: ▲US$ 37.37 million (FY 2013) (JPY 3.85 billion) (FY 2013)
- Number of employees: 2,530 (consolidated, as of March 31, 2014)
- Website: Official website

Nitto Boseki Co., Ltd. (日東紡績株式会社, Nittō Bōseki Kabushiki-gaisha), known by its operating name Nittobo, is a Tokyo-based company mainly known by its textile and fiberglass products. The company is also a dominant supplier of low-coefficient-of-thermal-expansion (CTE) glass, also known as "T-glass", a material used in packaging of CPU and GPU chips.

Nittobo is listed on the Tokyo Stock Exchange.
