= Unican Security Systems =

Unican Security Systems Ltd.
- Industry: Keys and locks
- Founded: Montreal, Quebec (1968)
- Founder: Aaron M. Fish
- Defunct: December 2000
- Headquarters: Montreal, Canada
- Website: unican.ca

Unican Security Systems Ltd. was a Canada-based company created by Aaron Fish in the 1960s and sold in 2000. At its sale (to Kaba Group), the company had over $800 million in sales annually and was the largest maker of key blanks and key copying machines in the world.

== History ==
Aaron Fish was born in the 1930s in Montreal, Quebec. He was the Chairman and CEO of Unican Security Systems Ltd. from its creation in 1965 to its sale in December 2000. He worked for his father in his early years as a locksmith. By the time he was 17 and had graduated from high school, he was operating as a key and lock distributor. From 1949 to 1960, Fish became the largest key and lock distributor in Montreal.

In 1960 Bell Canada decided they needed to get away from using keys, and had a requirement for a push button lock. Fish then promptly moved from being a distributor to being a developer, and created the first push button lock in North America. In 1964, in an effort to finance his company, Unican, he sold half of the business to private investors.

In 1967 Fish once again ran out of money, he took his company public to raise a quarter of a million dollars. Over the next 4 years Unican acquired 5 companies, from die casting Capitol Industries to key-maker Ilco in Fitchburg, Massachusetts. During the 1980s, the company grew exponentially, achieving sales of $100 million annually. In the 1990s, Unican Security Systems was supplying locks to the U.S. Pentagon and the United Nations.

By 1999, the company had sales of nearly $500 million annually, making 4.5 million keys each day for automobile companies, hotels, residential, commercial and the like.

In December 2000, Unican Security Systems was bought out by the Kaba Group of Switzerland for $36.00 a share based on 18 124 000 shares outstanding. Unican's fortunes declined following the 2000 sale, as global competition increased. In November 2007, Fish bought back the original east-end Montreal plant where the company began. He began slashing costs and soon returned Capitol Industries Ltd. to profitability. The Montreal Gazette on Sept. 6, 2008 reported that the company now specializes in zinc die-casting and finishing, mainly for metal furniture parts such as door handles.

Fish was responsible for a major change in the key making and lock industries in North America, Europe, South America and Asia. Peter Blaikie was a major supporter of the company.

In June 2016, Fish was awarded an honorary doctorate degree from Concordia University, making this his first degree since graduating high school.

Aaron Fish died on October 1, 2020.

== Bibliography ==
- Fish, Aaron M. (2012). Under Lock & Key: the Unican story. Hampstead, Quebec: A.M. Fish Holdings Ltd. ISBN 978-0-9881162-0-7.
