= Roy Heenan =

Canadian labour lawyer, academic and art collector (1935-2017)

Roy Heenan OC
- Born: Roy Lacaud Heenan; September 28, 1935; Mexico City, Mexico
- Died: February 3, 2017 (aged 81); Montreal, Quebec, Canada
- Education: McGill University
- Occupations: Lawyer and academic
- Known for: Heenan Blaikie (co-founder)
- Spouse: Rae MacCulloch
- Children: 4

Roy Lacaud Heenan, OC (September 28, 1935 – February 3, 2017) was a Canadian labour lawyer, academic and art collector. He was a founding partner of the Canadian law firm Heenan Blaikie.

== Early life and education ==
He was born in Mexico City to Ernest Heenan and his wife Yvonne Lacaud, and moved to Canada in 1947. He attended Trinity College School in Port Hope, Ontario, graduating in 1953. Heenan subsequently received a Bachelor of Arts degree in 1957 and a Bachelor of Civil Law degree in 1960, both from McGill University, where he joined the Kappa Alpha Society.

== Career ==
Heenan was called to the Bar of Quebec in 1961. He was a co-founder of Heenan Blaikie in 1973 and Chair of the Executive Committee until 2012. The firm closed in 2014 after its partners voted to dissolve it.

He was an adjunct professor in labour law at McGill University from 1971 to 1996, and a lecturer for the Industrial Relations Centre at Queen's University since 1972. He had also taught at Université Laval and the University of Ottawa.

Heenan served as the first chairman of the Pierre Elliott Trudeau Foundation. He was also a member of the board of the Canadian Broadcasting Corporation.

== Honours ==
In 1998, Heenan was made an Officer of the Order of Canada in recognition of being "one of the country's leading labour lawyers who has also made significant contributions to academic life and the art world". McGill University awarded him an honorary Doctor of Laws (LL.D.) degree in 2008.

== Death ==
Heenan died after a long illness on February 3, 2017, aged 81.
