= Hayabusachō =

District of Chiyoda, Tokyo, Japan

Coordinates: 35°40′53″N 139°44′37″E

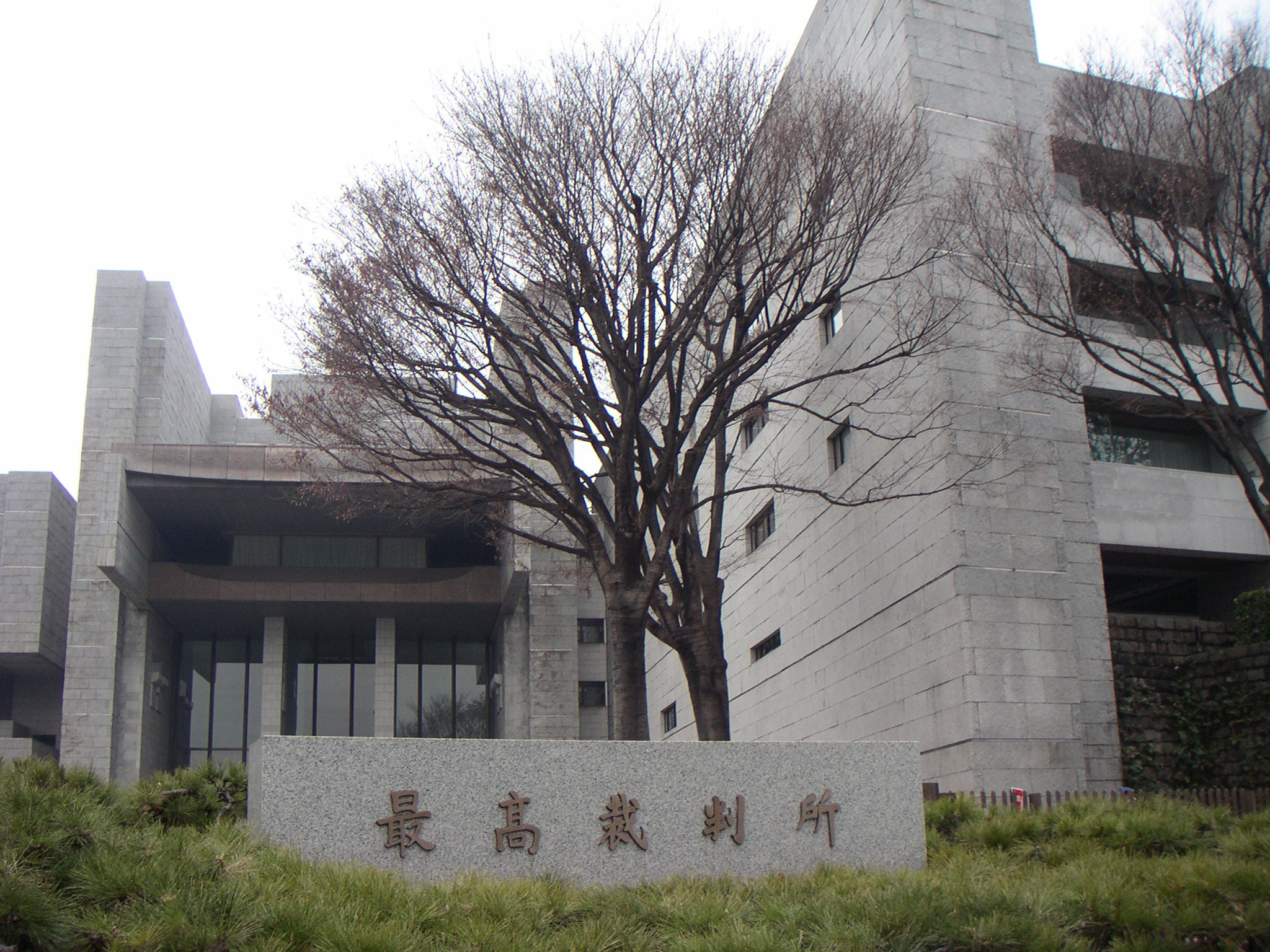
Supreme Court of Japan

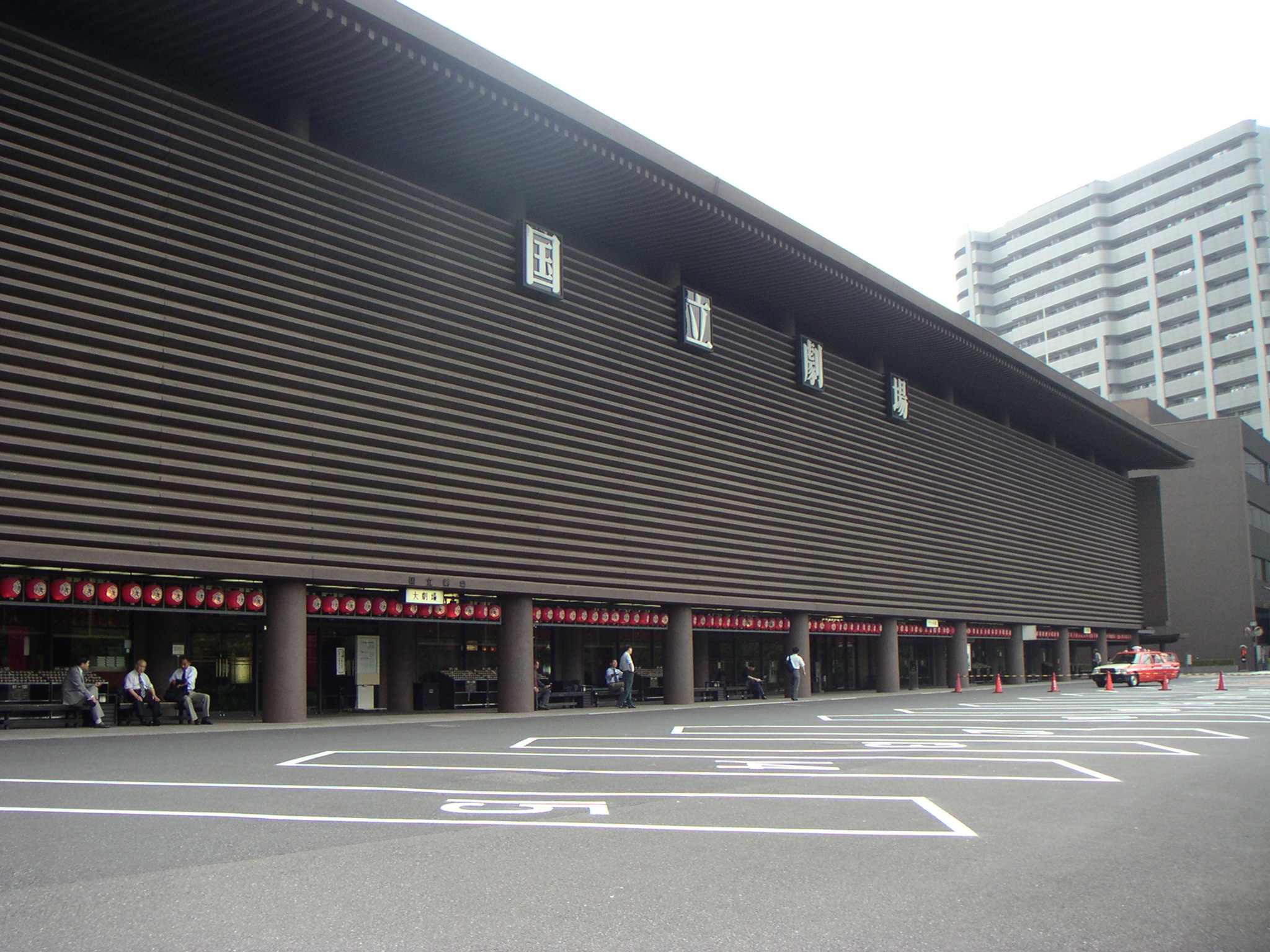
National Theatre of Japan

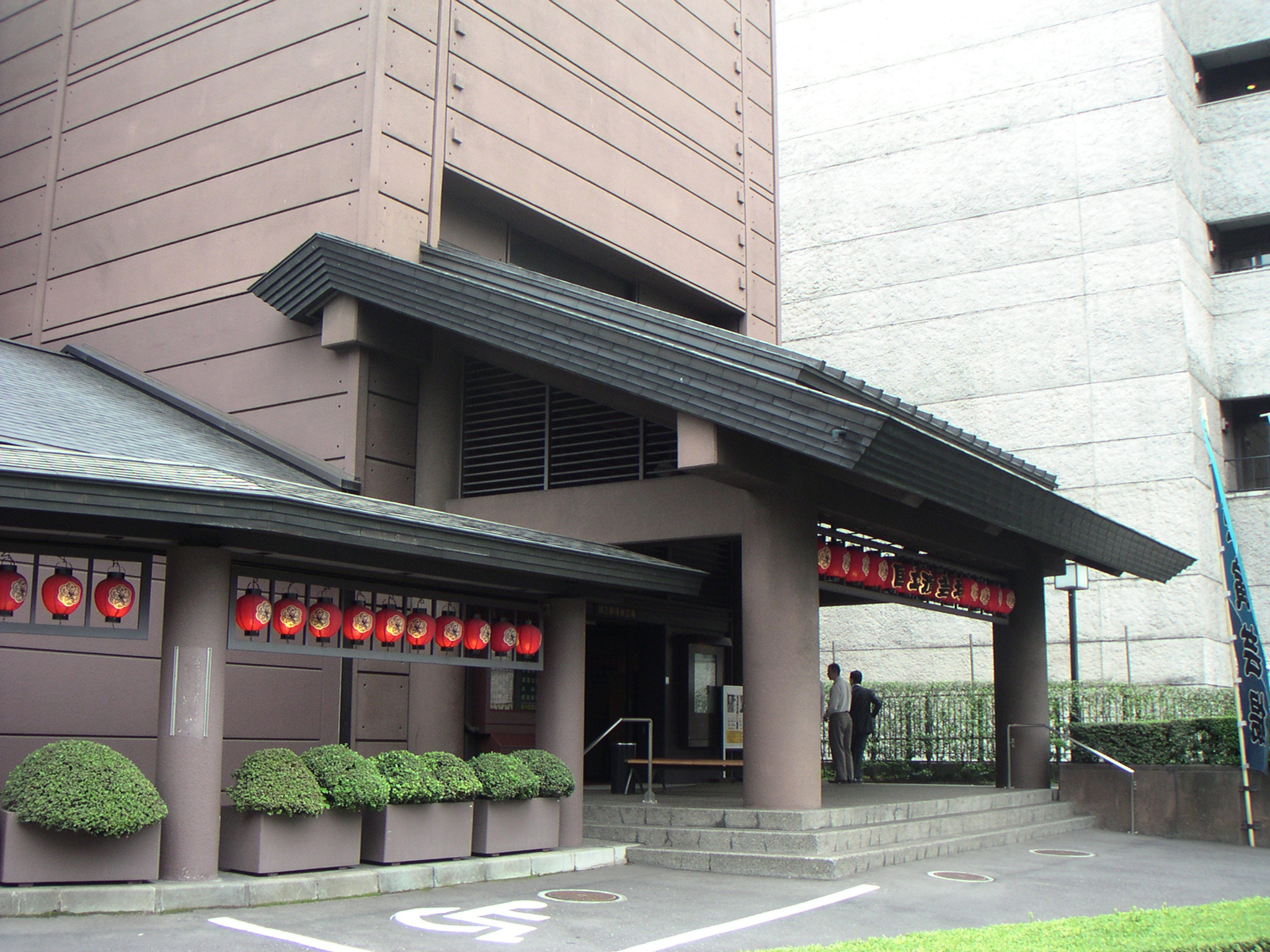
National Engei Hall

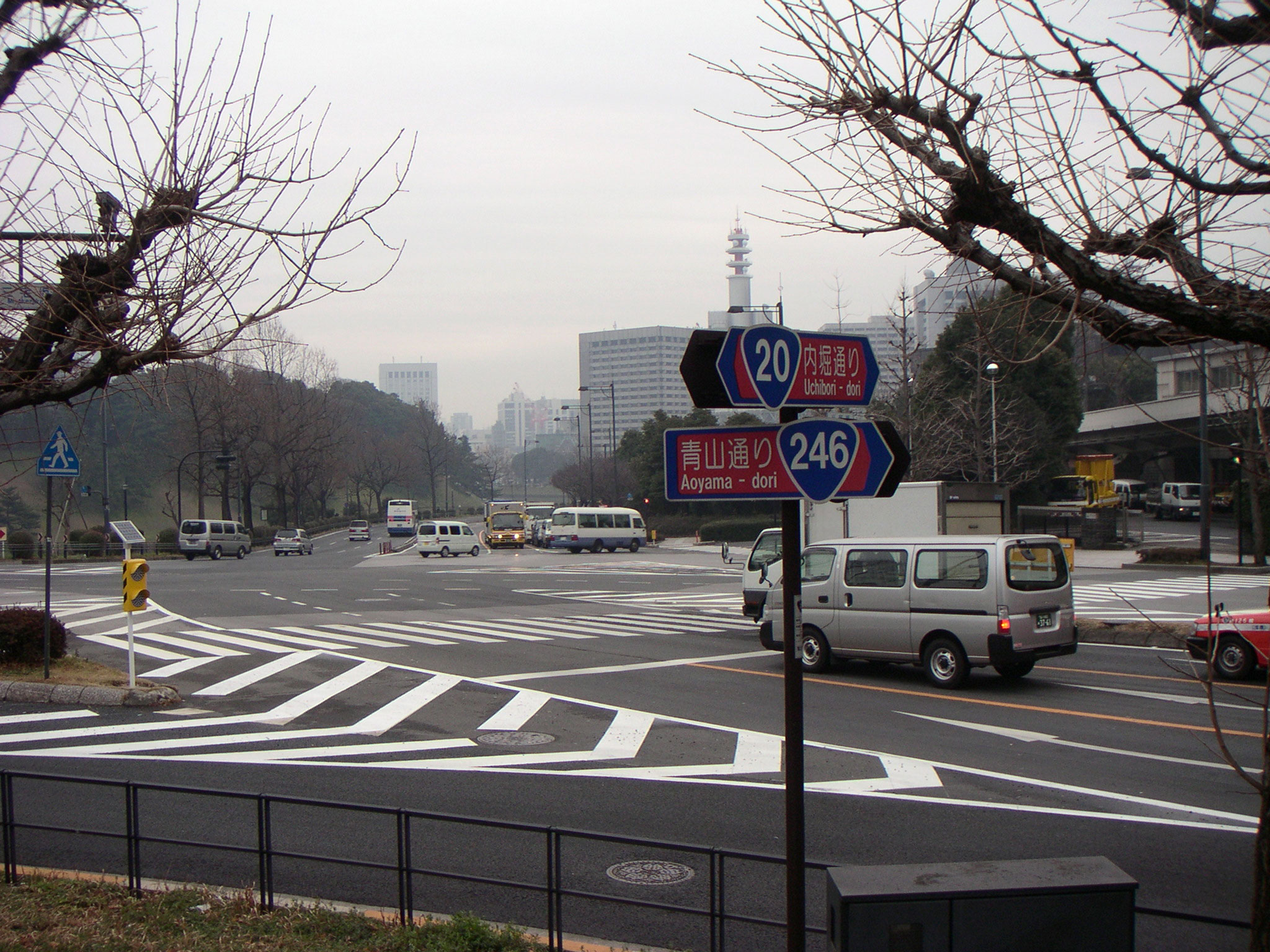
Miyakezaka Crossing

Hayabusachō (隼町, Hayabusa-chō) is a district of Chiyoda, Tokyo, Japan. As of April 1, 2007, the district's population is 483.

Hayabusachō is located of the western part of Chiyoda. It borders Kōjimachi to the north, the Tokyo Imperial Palace to the east, Nagatachō to the south, and Hirakawachō to the west.

This district is known as the location of the National Theatre of Japan and the Supreme Court of Japan.

== Places ==
- Supreme Court of Japan
- National Theatre of Japan
- National Engei Hall
- Hayabusachō Branch Government Office
- Hayabusachō Jūtaku
- Grand Arc Hanzomon
- Miyakezaka

== Education ==
Chiyoda Board of Education operates public elementary and junior high schools. Kōjimachi Elementary School (麹町小学校) is the zoned elementary of Hayabusachō. There is a freedom of choice system for junior high schools in Chiyoda Ward, and so there are no specific junior high school zones.
