= Death of Garry Hoy =

1993 death by falling in Toronto, Canada

Garry Hoy
- Hoy in 1979
- Born: January 28, 1954
- Died: July 9, 1993 (aged 39); Toronto, Ontario, Canada
- Cause of death: Fell to his death from the 24th floor of the Toronto-Dominion Centre
- Occupation: Lawyer
- Employer: Holden Day Wilson

Garry Hoy (January 28, 1954 – July 9, 1993) was a Canadian lawyer who died when he fell from the 24th floor of his office building at the Toronto-Dominion Centre in Toronto, Ontario. In an attempt to prove to a group of prospective articling students that the building's glass windows were unbreakable—a stunt he had performed without incident before—he threw his body against the window. The window gave way and Hoy fell to his death.

== Background ==
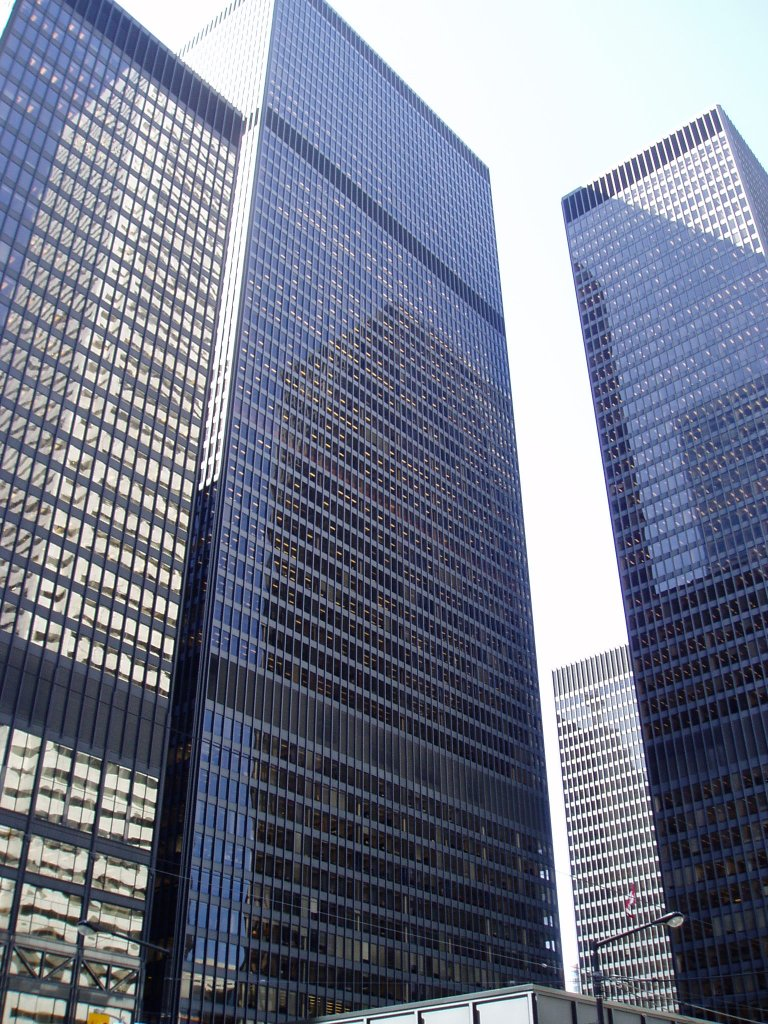
Three of the Toronto-Dominion Centre's towers: (left to right) the Ernst & Young Tower, TD Bank Tower, and TD North Tower. Hoy fell from the TD Bank Tower (known at the time as the Toronto-Dominion Bank Tower).

Hoy was called to the Ontario bar in 1979. In 1993, he was a partner at law firm Holden Day Wilson in Toronto, specialising in securities and mining law. While giving a tour of the Toronto-Dominion Centre to a group of dozens of articling students, he attempted to demonstrate the strength of the structure's window glass by slamming himself into a window. He had performed this stunt many times in the past, bouncing harmlessly off the glass. After one attempt with the same result, Hoy tried again, but this time the window gave way and he fell to his death from the 24th floor.

Structural engineer Bob Greer said "I don't know of any building code in the world that would allow a 160-pound [73 kg] man to run up against a glass and withstand it."

A crisis team from the Clarke Institute of Psychiatry was reportedly brought in to provide counselling for Hoy's colleagues, who were described by The Globe and Mail as being shocked and traumatised. On 15 July 1993, the law firm closed for the day to allow partners and employees to attend a memorial service for Hoy at the University of Toronto.

The shock of losing one of its most successful and popular lawyers was a contributing factor in the decline and closure in 1996 of Holden Day Wilson, which at the time was the largest law firm closure in Canada. When the firm announced its impending closure, managing director Peter Lauwers explained: "Garry was a prince of a guy and in some respects the glue that held together the more fractious elements of the firm."

== In popular culture ==
Hoy's experience was featured in numerous television shows, including MythBusters, The Unbelievable with Dan Aykroyd, and 1000 Ways to Die (in the episode "Unforced Errors").

Hoy's death was also adapted as a fictionalized plot point in the fifth season of Canadian dramedy series Workin' Moms and the second season of Canadian comedy series Billable Hours. In the opening of the second season, episode 1, "Birthday Suits", a lawyer attempts to demonstrate the strength of the office building windows by throwing himself against one of them, but the window shatters and he falls to his death.

Across the internet, numerous sources incorrectly use an image of an Australian man, based in Buffalo, New York, as of 2018, with a similar name.

== See also ==
- Autodefenestration
- List of unusual deaths in the 20th century
