= Nabtesco =

Japanese engineering company

Nabtesco Corporation
- Native name: ナブテスコ株式会社
- Type: Public (K.K)
- Traded as: TYO: 6268
- ISIN: JP3651210001
- Industry: Machinery
- Founded: September 29, 2003; 23 years ago
- Headquarters: Hirakawachō, Chiyoda-ku, Tokyo 102-0093, Japan
- Area served: Worldwide
- Key people: Katsuhiro Teramoto (President and CEO)
- Products: Industrial robot parts; Railway car parts; Aircraft parts; Flight control systems; Automatic door systems
- Revenue: ▲JPY 294.6 billion (US$ 2.7 billion) (FY 2017)
- Net income: ▲JPY 21 billion (US$ 192 million) (FY 2017)
- Number of employees: 7,713 (consolidated, December 31, 2018)
- Website: Official website

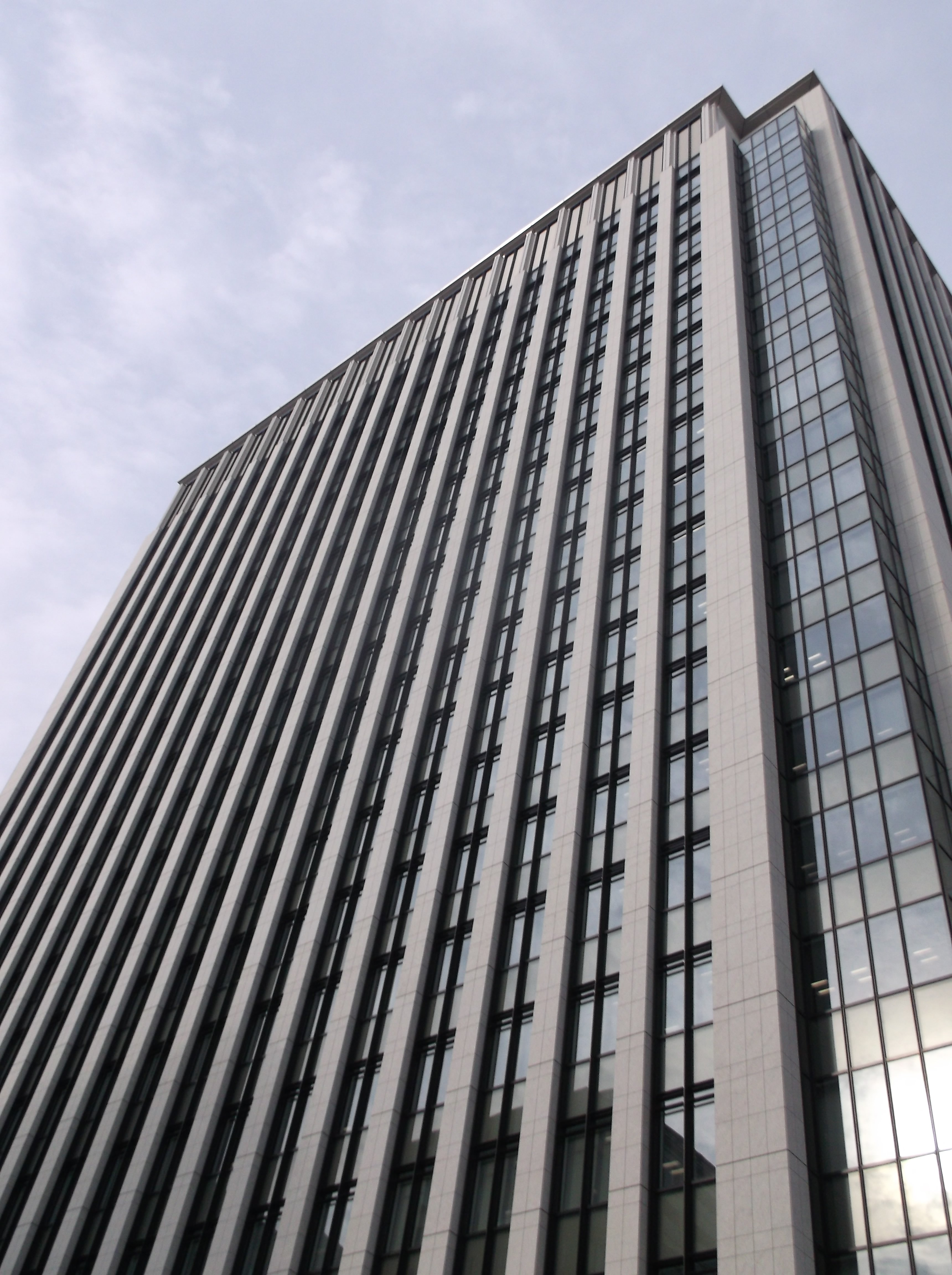
JA Kyosai Building, where the headquarters of Nabtesco is located

Nabtesco (ナブテスコ株式会社, Nabutesuko Kabushiki-gaisha) is a Japanese engineering company that specializes in gearboxes, rotors, motors and robotics.

The company was founded in 2003 and has several subsidiaries.

In 2010, the company acquired the Business Segment Door Automation division of the Swiss company Dormakaba.

Since 2017, Kazuaki Kotani has served as chairman and Katsuhiro Teramoto has served as president of Nabtesco.

== Products ==
The company manufactures cycloidal drives, railway brakes and platform screen doors.
