= Guy Blaikie =

Personal information
- Full name: Kenneth Guy Blaikie
- Born: 8 May 1897; Johannesburg, Transvaal, South Africa
- Died: 8 June 1968 (aged 71); Lennoxville, Quebec, Canada
- Nickname: Bill
- Batting: Left-handed
- Bowling: Left-arm medium, Slow left arm orthodox
- Role: All-rounder

Domestic team information
- Years: Team
- 1921–1924: Oxford University
- 1921–1923: Somerset
- First-class debut: 7 May 1921 Oxford University v Middlesex
- Last First-class: 9 July 1924 Oxford University v Cambridge University

Career statistics
| Competition | First-class |
|---|---|
| Matches | 27 |
| Runs scored | 1080 |
| Batting average | 22.97 |
| 100s/50s | 2/3 |
| Top score | 120 |
| Balls bowled | 2672 |
| Wickets | 46 |
| Bowling average | 26.00 |
| 5 wickets in innings | – |
| 10 wickets in match | – |
| Best bowling | 4/14 |
| Catches/stumpings | 20/– |
- Source: CricketArchive, 3 July 2010

Kenneth Guy Blaikie (8 May 1897 – 8 June 1968), generally known as "Bill Blaikie", played first-class cricket for Oxford University and Somerset in the early 1920s. He was born at Johannesburg in South Africa and died at Lennoxville, Quebec, Canada. He was the father of the prominent Canadian lawyer and politician Peter Blaikie.

== Family and career ==
Blaikie's grandfather moved to South Africa from Scotland in 1861. His father served in active duty during the Second Boer War and died during the Siege of Ladysmith in 1900. Blaikie himself was in 1918 awarded a Rhodes Scholar to study at the University of Oxford, though he was allowed to defer his Oxford entry because at this stage he was still serving in the army. In 1924 he was effectively "headhunted" from Oxford by H. W. Matheson (who later became vice-president for Research and Patents with Shawinigan Chemicals Ltd.). Blaikie insisted on remaining in England for the rest of the cricket season and then relocated to Canada where he worked as a chemist in the laboratory of the Shawinigan Chemicals Industries. In September 1932 he married Mary Petrie Black and their son Peter was born in 1937. A daughter, Jane, was born in 1940.

Blaikie also served as a captain with the 81st Field Artillery Battery (which is now the 62nd (Shawinigan) Field Regiment, RCA's senior sub-unit) during World War II.

== Cricket career ==
As a cricket player, Blaikie was a left-handed batsman who usually played in the middle of the batting order but was on occasion used as an opening batsman, and a left-arm medium-pace or orthodox spin bowler. He played for Oxford University over four seasons from 1921, but only in his last season, 1924, did he gain a regular place and he won his blue for cricket that year, his last first-class match being the University Match against Cambridge University.

Blaikie had a curious start to his first-class cricket career. He was picked for an early season match in 1921 for Oxford against Middlesex but made little impression with either bat or ball. Dropped from the Oxford side after this single match, he next appeared less than two weeks later in a game against the university side, playing for Somerset, and making 45 in the county's second innings. That convinced the Oxford team to give him another trial, but he was not successful in two further matches. This pattern was repeated in 1922: an early unsuccessful match against Middlesex, followed by a match four weeks later against the university side for Somerset in which he this time scored a second innings 65 and took three wickets as well. A further few matches for Oxford followed, but again Blaikie was unable to keep his place.

For a third time, Blaikie failed to make an impression in early-season matches for Oxford in 1923, and from the end of May he switched to play occasional games for Somerset, making his highest score for the county side, 73, in the game against Glamorgan at Cardiff Arms Park.

In contrast to his earlier travails, Blaikie enjoyed great success for Oxford University in 1924, finishing at the top of the team's batting averages and third in the bowling. Coming into the side in late May, he first enjoyed bowling success, taking four wickets for 14 runs, the best innings figures of his career, in the match against the Free Foresters. Blaikie came into his own as a batsman when Oxford left The Parks and went on tour. In the first match away from Oxford, against Surrey, he bettered his highest first-class score, making 75 in the first innings. Then, against the MCC at Lord's, according to Wisden, he "astonished the critics by the vigour of his left-handed hitting". He made 120, which was to be the highest score of his first-class career. The next match was against Gloucestershire, and Blaikie hit 102 in 75 minutes with 19 fours, the next highest score in the innings being just 28. The University Match was a disappointment for Oxford, with Cambridge winning by nine wickets, and Blaikie scored 0 in the first innings, and 48 in the second, when he "hit away with amazing brilliancy", according to Wisden. This may have been the match which according to a Punch report came alive only when "Guy Blaikie came in to bat. Not only did he hit to the boundary. One ball went right over the fence and dropped into St. John's Wood Road".

Blaikie did not play again in first-class cricket after leaving Oxford for Canada in the summer of 1924.
