= Dorma =

German-Swiss door technology company

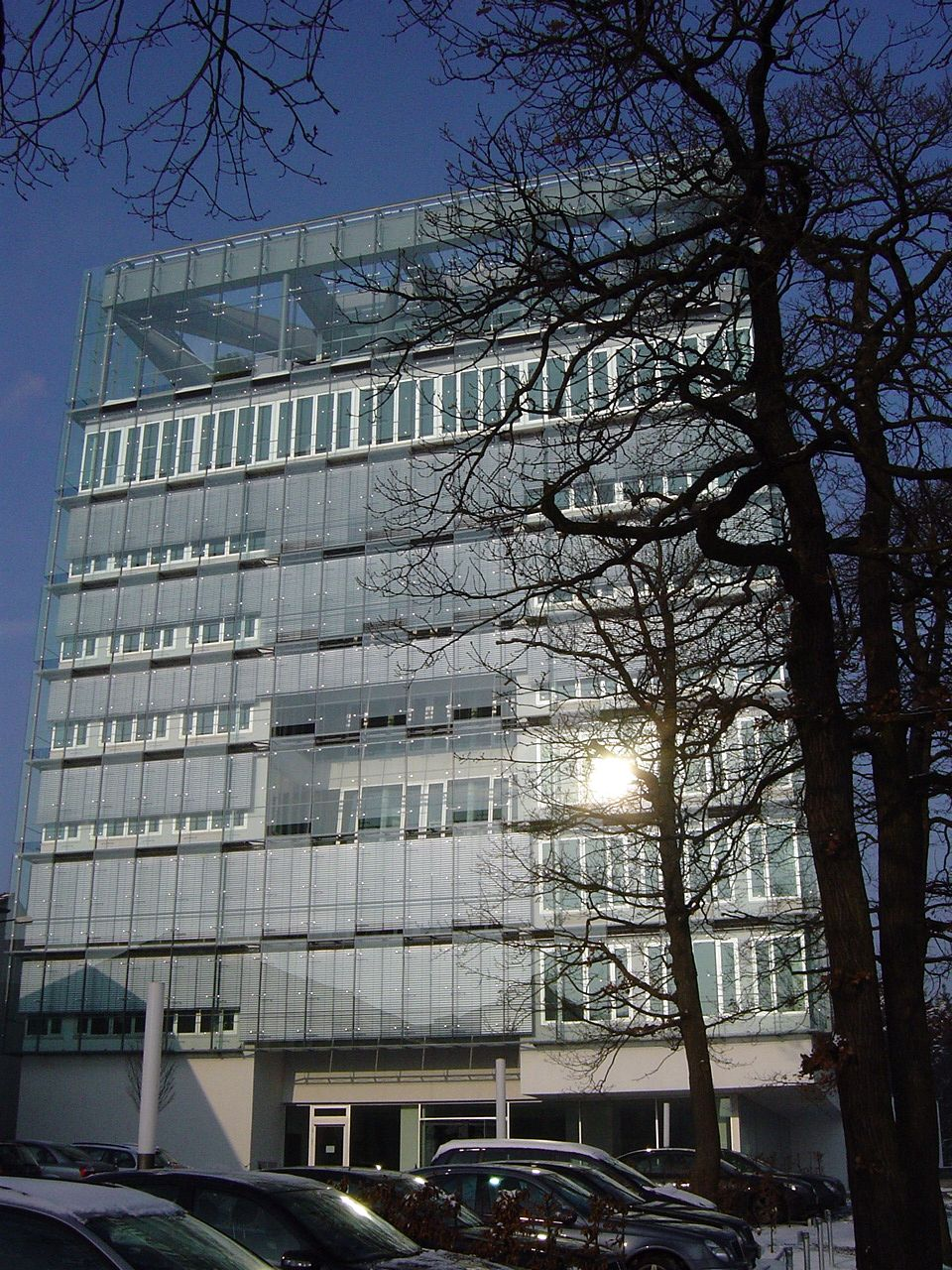
Dorma headquarters in Ennepetal, Germany

Dorma was a German company that produced door technology systems and allied products. It merged with Kaba Holding in September 2015 and became part of Dormakaba Group.

== History ==
Dorma was founded by Wilhelm Dörken and Rudolf Mankel as Dörken & Mankel KG in Ennepetal, Germany, in 1908.

By 1950, the company entered into the "door closer" industry, with production of its first automatic doors by 1962. Glass fittings, safety services and emergency exit control systems were later added to the product range.

Dorma began international operations when it opened its first production facility in Singapore in 1978.

In 1999, the company acquired Groom. Three years later, it began new business with mobile partition walls.

The family business was managed by owner Karl-Rudolf Mankel in third generation. As part of succession planning, previous sole Dorma proprietor Karl-Rudolf Mankel transferred the majority of his shareholding to his daughters Christine and Stephanie in March 2009.

In April 2015, Dorma Holding announced a planned merger with Swiss-based Kaba Group. The group went on to become Dormakaba Group.

== Operations ==
The company was divided into six divisions: Door Control, Automatics, Glass, Movable Walls, Security Systems & Trade Counters. Dorma’s head office in Ennepetal controlled 69 wholly owned companies in 45 countries. Its major production plants were located in Europe, China, Malaysia, North and South America.

=== Products ===
- Door control: door closers, door furniture and fittings, window handles, hinges and locks
- Automatics: automatic door operators, sliding doors, swing doors and revolving doors, automatically operated sliding glass panel partitions
- Glass: fittings, door and side panel rails, locks
- Security: access control systems, security door fittings, emergency exit control systems, lock and electric keeps, security and detection systems
- Movable-Walls: sound-insulating walls, sound-insulating movable glass walls
