= Goodman and Carr =

1965–2007 Canadian law firm

Goodmann and Carr
- Major practice areas: Tax and real estate
- Date founded: 1965; 61 years ago
- Founders: Wolfe Goodman and Donald Carr
- Company type: Limited Liability Partnership
- Dissolved: 2007

Goodman and Carr was a Canadian law firm. It was established in 1965 when Wolfe Goodman and Donald Carr combined their practices. At its height, the firm was considered one of the largest tax and real estate boutique firms in the country, employing over 140 lawyers at one time. In 2007, following partner defections and failed talks to merge with the major international law firm Baker & Mackenzie, the firm, along with 85 lawyers, announced it would be closing. At the time, it was considered Canada's largest law firm failure, surpassing the previous record set by Holden Day Wilson LLP in 1996. That record was surpassed in 2014, when Heenan Blaikie voted to dissolve itself.
