= Dormakaba =

Swiss multinational access and security company

dormakaba Holding AG
- Type: Public
- Traded as: SIX: DOKA
- ISIN: CH0011795959
- Industry: Security technology
- Founded: 1862
- Founders: Wilhelm Dorken, Rudolf Mankel, Franz Bauer
- Headquarters: Rümlang, canton of Zürich, Switzerland
- Key people: Svein Richard Brandtzæg (Chairman) Till Reuter (CEO)
- Products: identification, keys, key cutting machines, locks, lodging products, safe locks, workforce management
- Revenue: 2.87 billion CHF (2024/2025)
- Number of employees: 15,346 (2024/25)
- Website: www.dormakabagroup.com

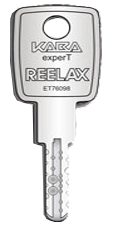
KABA key

dormakaba Holding AG (former Kaba Holding AG) is a global security group based in Rümlang, Switzerland, formed as the result of a merger between Kaba and Dorma in September 2015. It is publicly traded on the SIX Swiss Exchange.

== History ==
=== Origins ===
In 1862, Franz Bauer founded Kaba in Zurich as a locksmith shop and cash register factory. The firm was sold in 1915 to Leo Bodmer, who renamed the company to Bauer AG. When inventor Fritz Schori created the first cylinder lock with reversible key in 1934, Bauer AG patented the invention and named the lock after the firm's founder Franz Bauer, known in German as 'Kassenbauer' (maker of cash registers) – 'Kaba' for short.

In 1908, Dörken & Mankel KG was founded by Wilhelm Dörken and his brother-in-law Rudolf Mankel in Ennepetal. Dörken & Mankel KG was later known as Dorma.

In 1995, Bauer Holding AG was renamed to Kaba Holding AG. [citation needed] The company’s shares have been listed on the SIX Swiss Exchange since November 1995.

With the takeover of Unican Security Systems in 2001, Kaba gained a foothold in North America and added the Silca, Ilco and Kaba Mas brands as part of the merger.

In 2006, the company acquired the Wah Yuet Group in China, the US company Computerized Security Systems (CSS) with its well-known Saflok and La Gard brands, and the Dutch company H. Cillekens Zn. B.V. In addition, it entered into various joint ventures with the Indian Minda Group.

In 2011, Kaba sold its Door Automation branch to the Japanese Nabtesco Group.

=== Merger ===
On 30 April 2015, the family-owned German company Dorma and the Swiss Kaba Group announced their planned merger. After competition authorities approved the merger at the end of August 2015, the dormakaba Group commenced operations on 1 September 2015.

=== 2015 onwards ===
Ulrich Graf had served as chairman of the board of directors of Dormakaba, formerly Kaba, since 2006. He did not stand for re-election at the general meeting of October 23, 2018, having announced this decision in October 2017. The board proposed Riet Cadonau, then CEO of the Dormakaba Group, as his successor. If elected, Cadonau was to continue as CEO in parallel for two to three years.

== Operations ==
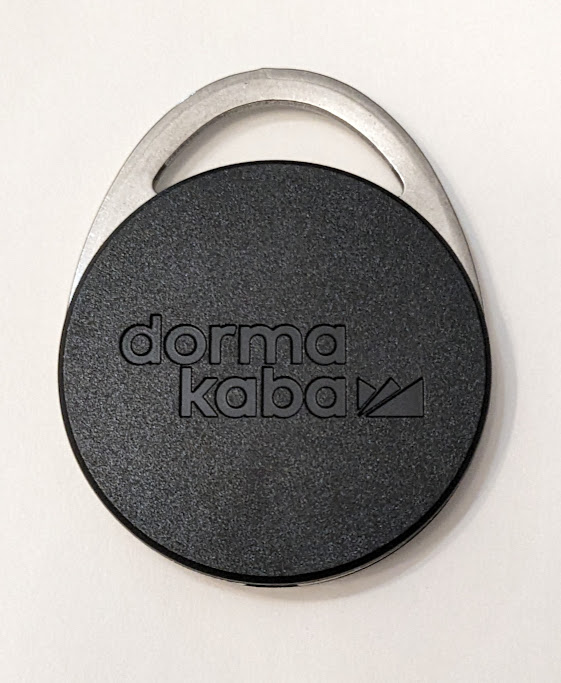
A dormakaba RFID key fob.

Since July 1, 2023, dormakaba's organizational structure consists of the global commercial core business Access Solutions and Key & Wall Solutions – supported by Global Functions such as Operations and Innovation. The OEM (Original Equipment Manufacturer) business of the Asia-Pacific region has been moved to Key & Wall Solutions and renamed Key & Wall Solutions and OEM (KWO).

dormakaba's new business model focuses on core markets. These core markets include the five largest Access Solutions markets – Germany, Switzerland, the UK and Ireland, North America and Australia, which together account for 65% of Access Solutions sales – as well as the two fastest-growing markets in China and India.

=== Brands ===
dormakaba operates with the following brands worldwide:

- dormakaba
- Dorma Hüppe
- Silca
- Ilco
- BEST
- Kilargo
- Modernfold
- Probuck
- Skyfold
