= Peter Blaikie =

Canadian lawyer and politician

Peter Macfarlane Blaikie (May 10, 1937) is a Canadian lawyer and a bilingual politician from Quebec and founder of Heenan Blaikie.

== Genealogy ==
Blaikie was born in Shawinigan, Mauricie on May 10, 1937. He was the son of Kenneth Guy "Bill" Blaikie (1897–1968) and Mary Petrie Black.

His great grandfather moved to South Africa from Scotland in 1861. His grandfather served in active duty during the Second Boer War and died during the Siege of Ladysmith in 1900. His father, who was a Rhodes Scholar, moved to Canada and worked as a chemist in the laboratory of the Shawinigan Chemicals Industries. He also was a captain with the 81st Field Artillery Battery (which is now the 62nd (Shawinigan) Field Regiment, RCA's senior sub-unit) during World War II.

== Education ==
In 1958, Blaikie earned a Bachelor of Arts degree from Bishop's University in Lennoxville, Quebec where he became lifelong friends with fellow student Scott Griffin, the founder of the Griffin Trust For Excellence In Poetry that annually awards the Griffin Poetry Prize. In 1958 Blaikie was chosen as one of two Quebec Rhodes Scholars, a distinction shared with his father who had earlier gained a Rhodes scholarship from Natal where the family was then living. Later in 1958 Blaikie took up his scholarship at St. John's College, Oxford, graduating in 1960 with a Bachelor of Arts degree (subsequently a Master of Arts degree). Blaikie went on to obtain a Bachelor of Civil Law degree from McGill University in 1965 and was admitted to the Barreau du Québec the following year.

== Law career ==
In 1973, he co-founded Heenan Blaikie in Montreal which became a leading Quebec and Canadian law firm, expanding to Toronto, Vancouver and Los Angeles. Lawyers in the firm included former Canadian Prime Ministers Pierre Trudeau and Jean Chrétien as well as the former Premier of Quebec, Pierre-Marc Johnson. From the 1960s to the 1980s, Peter Blaikie was a lecturer in economics at Loyola College and at Concordia University and at the McGill University Faculty of Law.

== Federal politics ==
Blaikie ran as a Progressive Conservative candidate in the 1979 and 1980 elections in the federal district of Lachine. Each time he finished second against Liberal incumbent Rod Blaker.

Blaikie was a leadership candidate at the party's 1976 and 1983 conventions. In both cases, he dropped from the race before the first ballot took place.

He was the party's president from 1981 to 1983.

== Language policy activist ==
For many years, Blaikie lobbied against Quebec's Charter of the French Language. He was the lead defendant in Procureur général de la province de Québec c. Peter M. Blaikie et autres, the 1979 constitutional challenge of the charter's Chapter III.

From 1987 until 1989, Blaikie served as chairman of the board of administration of Alliance Quebec. He also briefly served as acting president of the organization, during the transition between the presidencies of Royal Orr and Robert Keaton.

== Other activities ==
A longtime friend and advisor to Aaron Fish, chairman and chief executive officer of Unican Security Systems Ltd., Blaikie was made a Unican director in 1983 and served as the public company's president and chief operating officer from late 1993 until 1998, when he returned to his law practice.

Peter Blaikie is also a business columnist for the Montreal Gazette and Les Affaires, and has been a television commentator with CKMI-TV, the Montreal station of the Global Television Network. He is married to a psychiatrist, Dr. Maja Romer, with whom he has three daughters and one son.

== Honour ==
In 1997, Blaikie was inducted into the Académie des Grands Shawiniganais, which consists of a Hall of Fame of Shawinigan residents, past and present. Other inductees include former Prime Minister of Canada Jean Chrétien, historian Jacques Lacoursière and professional ice hockey goaltender Jacques Plante.
