= Hanzōmon Station =

Metro station in Tokyo, Japan

Hanzōmon Station 半蔵門駅

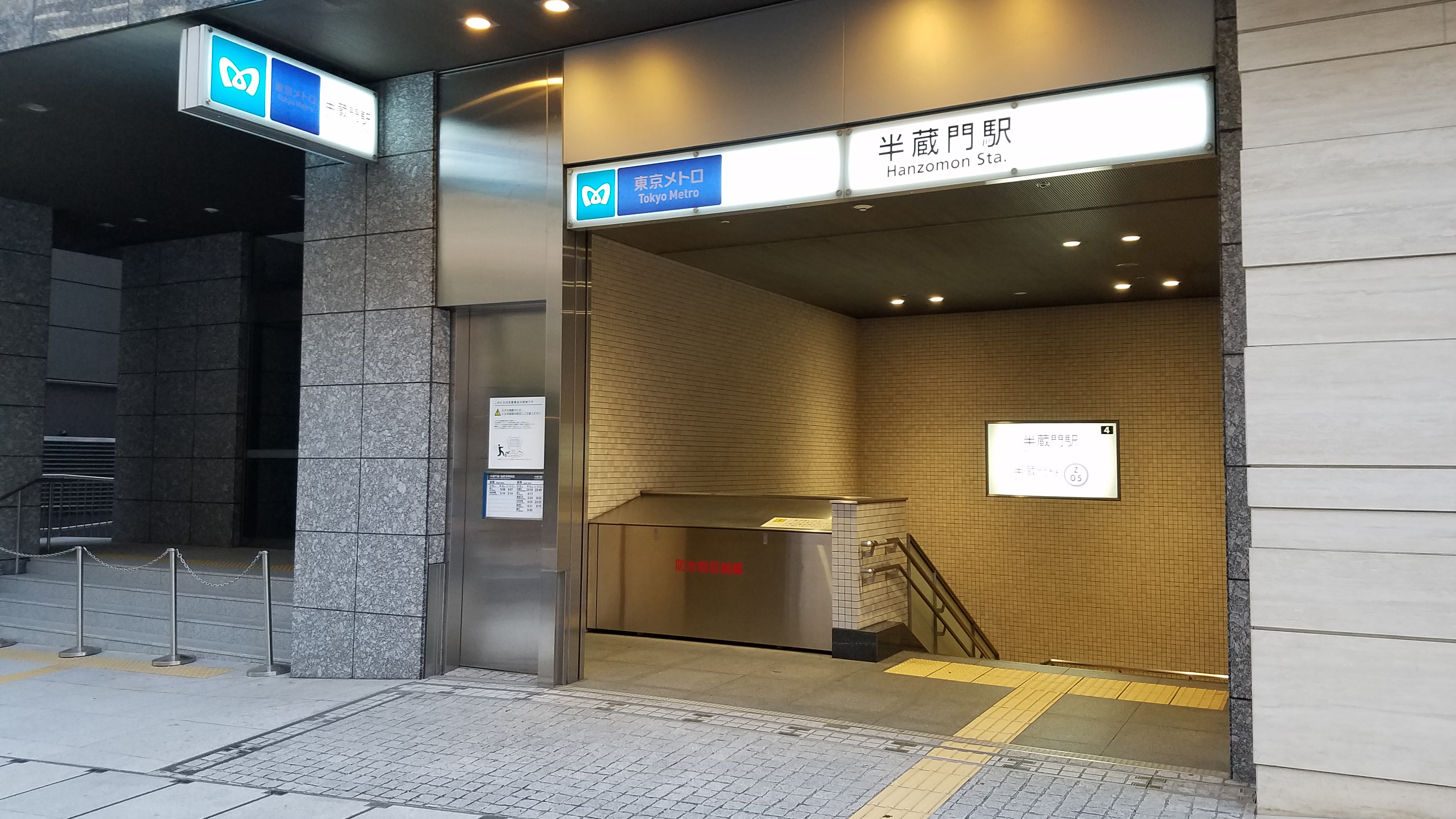
- Entrance 5, 2017

General information
- Location: 1-6 Kojimachi, Chiyoda, Tokyo; Japan
- Coordinates: 35°41′8.4912″N 139°44′29.9652″E
- Operator: Tokyo Metro
- Line: Hanzōmon Line
- Platforms: 1 island platform
- Tracks: 2

Construction
- Structure type: Underground

Other information
- Station code: Z-5

History
- Opened: 9 December 1982; 43 years ago

Services
Preceding station	Tokyo Metro	Following station
Nagatachō towards Shibuya	Hanzōmon Line	Kudanshita towards Oshiage
Location
- Location within Tokyo Yamanote Loop Location within Tokyo wards area Location within Japan

Hanzōmon Station (半蔵門駅, Hanzōmon-eki) is a subway station on the Tokyo Metro Hanzōmon Line in Chiyoda, Tokyo, Japan, operated by the Tokyo subway operator Tokyo Metro. It is located near the Hanzōmon Gate of the Imperial Palace.

The station was the eastern terminal of the Hanzōmon Line from 1982 to 1989 and is still used as a terminal for some morning rush hour trains. It is the only station on the Hanzōmon Line not to connect with any other subway or railway lines; however, it is a five-minute walk from Kōjimachi Station on the Tokyo Metro Yurakucho Line.

== Station layout ==
The station is composed of a singular island platform serving two tracks.

=== Platforms ===
1	Hanzōmon Line	for Nagatacho and Shibuya; Den-en-toshi Line for Chūō-Rinkan
2	Hanzōmon Line	for Otemachi, Kudanshita and Oshiage; Tobu Skytree Line for Tōbu-Dōbutsu-Kōen; Tobu Isesaki Line for Kuki; Tōbu Nikkō Line for Minami-Kurihashi

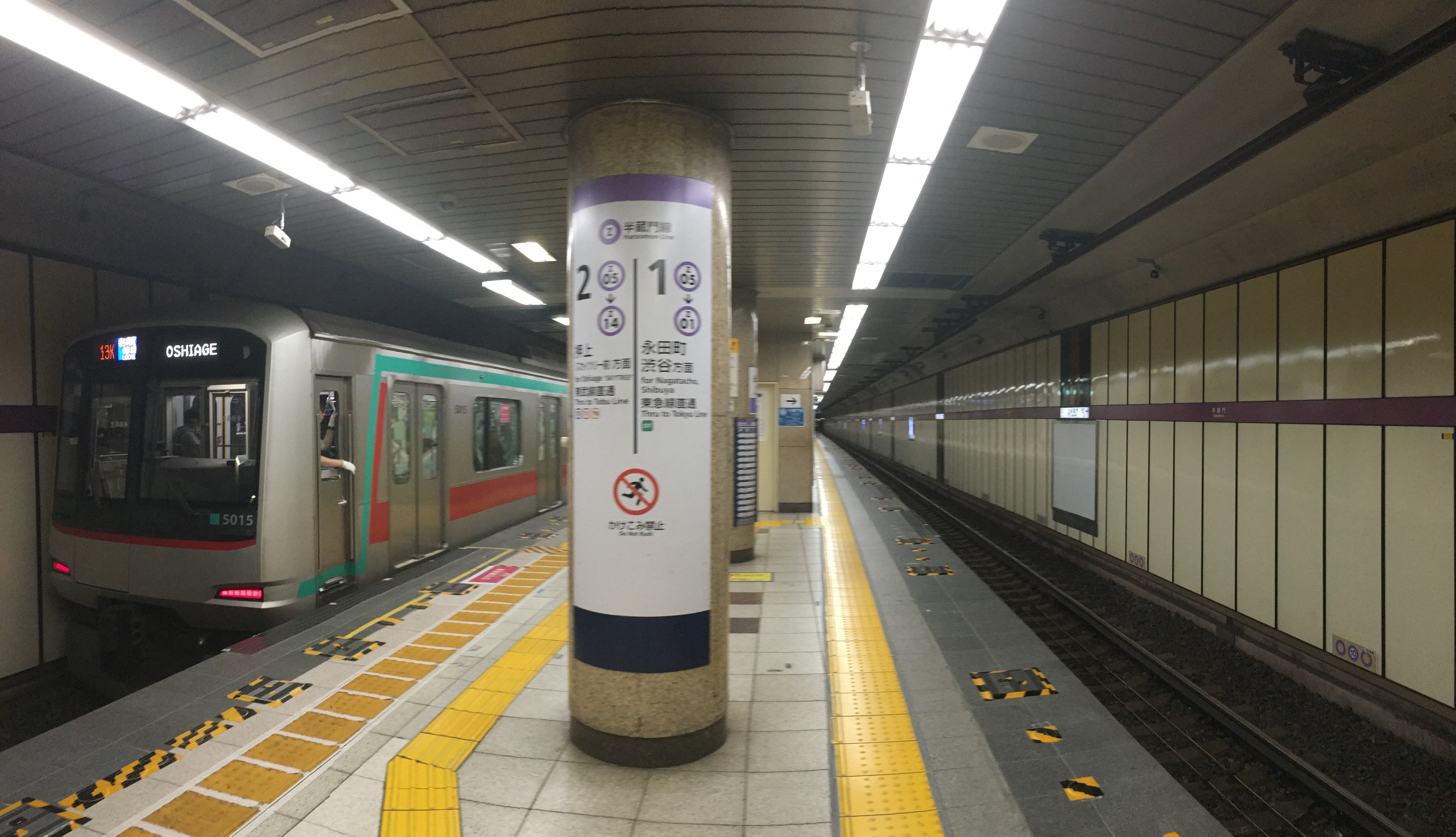
Station platforms, 2018

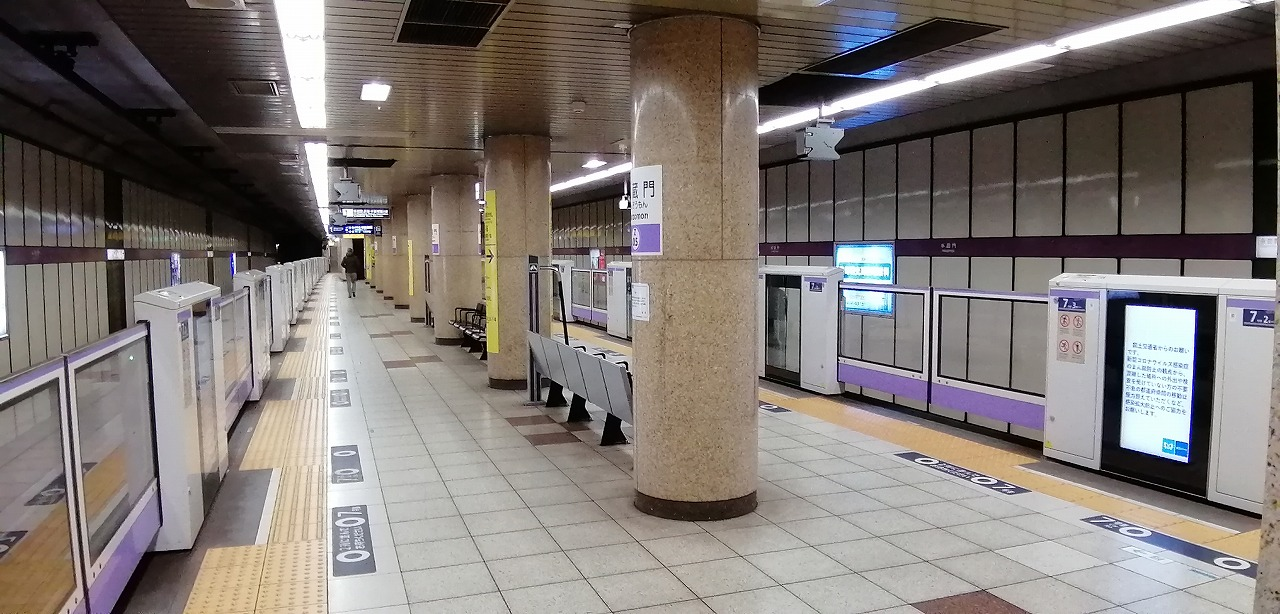
The island platform, September 2022

== History ==
Hanzōmon Station was opened on 9 December 1982 by the Teito Rapid Transit Authority (TRTA), as the eastern terminus of the Hanzōmon Line at the time. It became a through station when the Hanzōmon Line was extended to Mitsukoshimae.

The station facilities were inherited by Tokyo Metro after the privatization of the Teito Rapid Transit Authority (TRTA) in 2004.
