= Holden Day Wilson =

1900–1996 Canadian law firm

Holden Day Wilson LLP
- Date founded: 1900
- Company type: Limited Liability Partnership
- Dissolved: 1996

Holden Day Wilson LLP was a law firm in Toronto, Ontario, Canada. When it closed in 1996, it was the largest law firm failure in Canadian history.

== History ==
The firm was founded in the early 20th century as Day, Wilson, led by founding partner Jimmy Day's expertise in the incorporation of mining companies. In 1990, the firm merged with the prominent firm of Holden, Murdoch and renamed itself Holden Day Wilson.

In 1993, one of its partners, Garry Hoy, died after throwing himself against a glass window of its downtown Toronto-Dominion Centre office, in a playful attempt to demonstrate the strength of the window. The window popped out of the frame and Hoy fell to his death from the 24th floor. The shock of losing one of its most successful lawyers was a contributing factor in the firm's decline and fall, and the firm lost nearly 30 lawyers in the following three years.

In 1996, the firm closed permanently amid controversy over unpaid bills. Until the closing of Goodman and Carr in 2007, it was the largest law firm failure in Canadian history.
