= Nagatachō Station =

Metro station in Chiyoda, Tokyo, Japan

Coordinates: 35°40′43.4892″N 139°44′24.936″E

Nagatachō Station 永田町

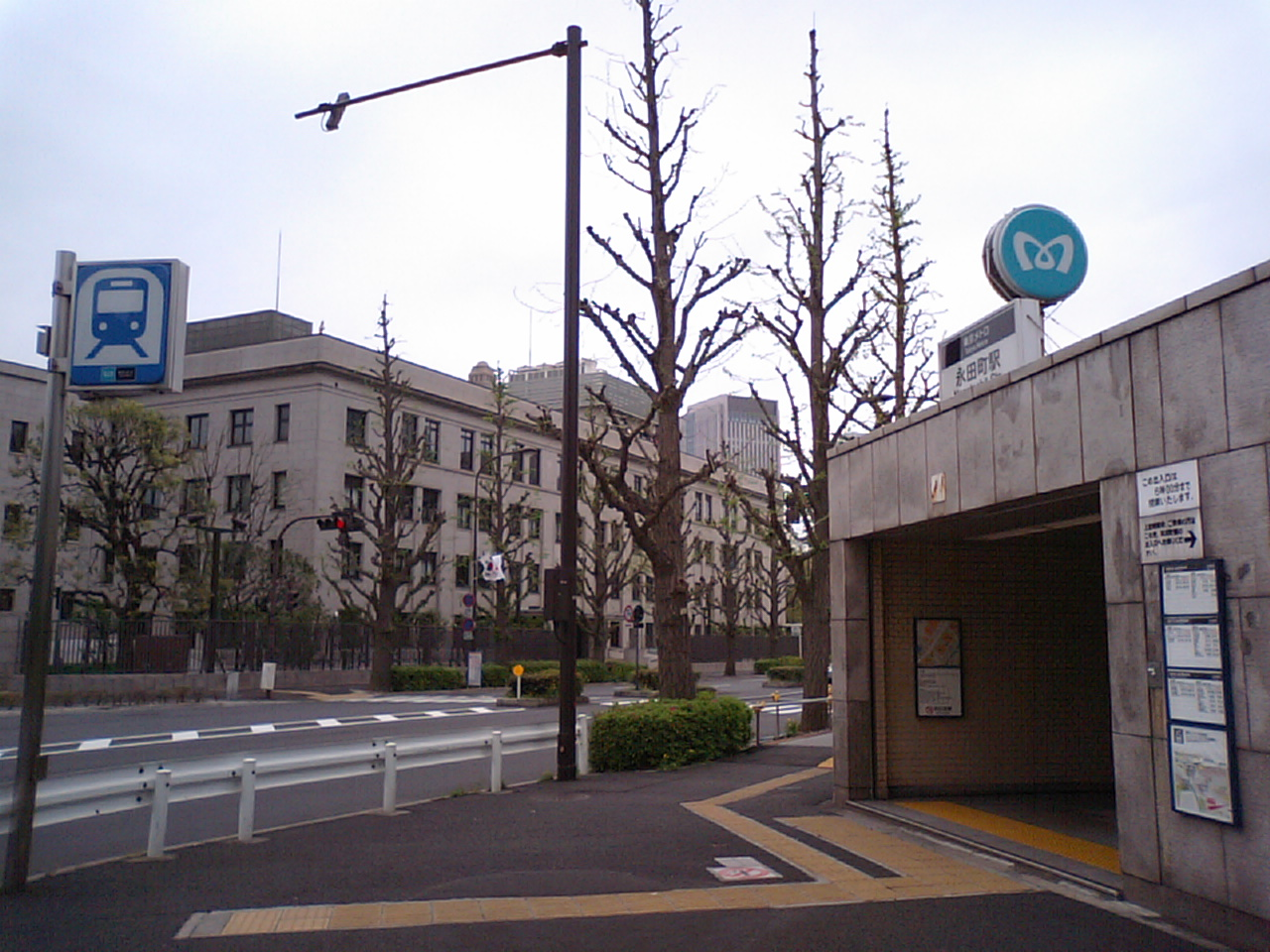
- Nagatachō Station "No. 1" entrance, April 2008

General information
- Location: 1-11-28 Nagatacho, Chiyoda, Tokyo （東京都千代田区永田町1-11-28） Japan
- Operator: Tokyo Metro
- Lines: Hanzōmon Line; Namboku Line; Yūrakuchō Line
- Platforms: 3 island platforms (1 on each level)
- Tracks: 6 (2 on each level)

Construction
- Structure type: Underground

Other information
- Station code: N-07, Y-16, Z-04

History
- Opened: 30 October 1974; 51 years ago

Services
Preceding station	Tokyo Metro	Following station
Kōjimachi towards Wakoshi	Yūrakuchō Line	Sakuradamon towards Shin-kiba
Aoyama-itchōme towards Shibuya	Hanzōmon Line	Hanzōmon towards Oshiage
Tameike-Sannō towards Meguro	Namboku Line	Yotsuya towards Akabane-iwabuchi
Location
- Location within Tokyo Yamanote Loop Location within Tokyo wards area Location within Japan

Nagatachō Station (永田町駅, Nagatachō-eki) is a subway station in the Nagatacho district of Chiyoda, Tokyo, Japan, operated by the Tokyo subway operator Tokyo Metro.

== Lines ==
Nagatachō Station is served by the following three lines.

- Namboku Line (N-07)
- Yūrakuchō Line (Y-16)
- Hanzōmon Line (Z-04)

It is also connected by an underground passageway from the western end of the Hanzōmon Line platform to Akasaka-mitsuke Station on the Ginza and Marunouchi lines.

== Station layout ==
The station consists of three island platforms, each serving two tracks.

- B1F level: Ticket vending areas
- B3F level: Namboku Line platforms
- B4F level: Yūrakuchō Line platforms
- B6F level: Hanzōmon Line platforms
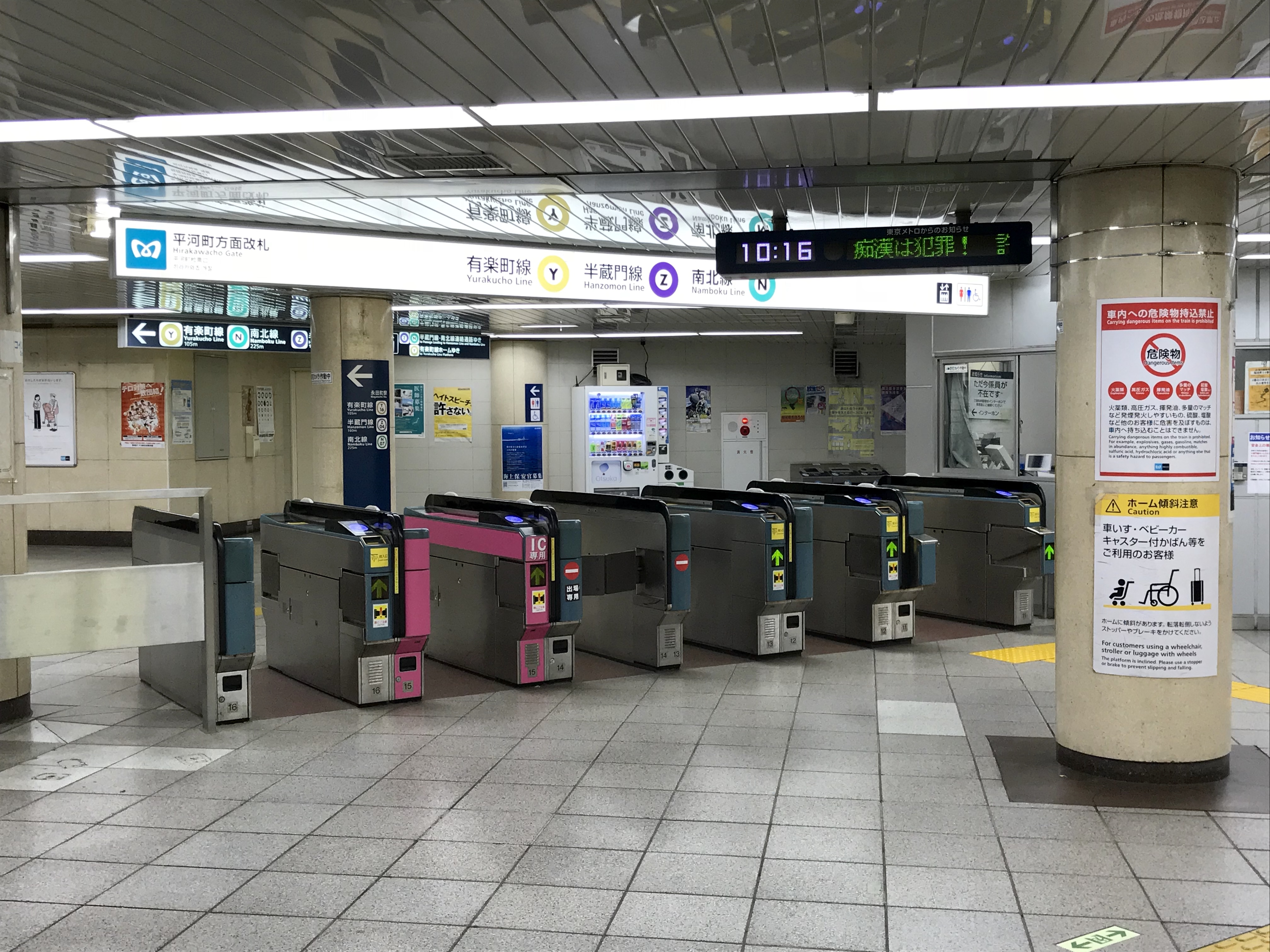
Ticket gates

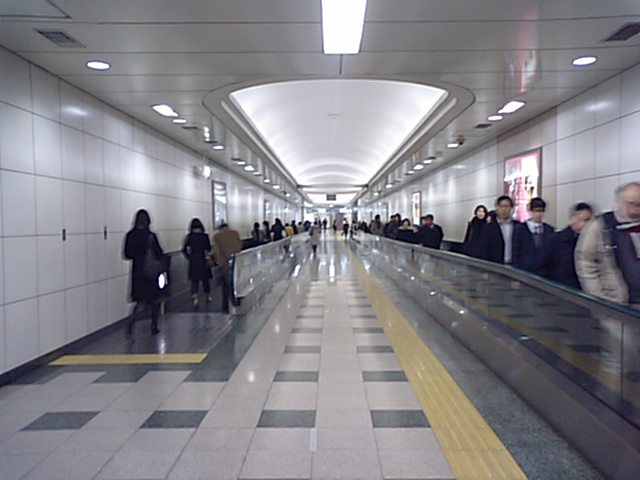
Moving walkway to the Namboku Line platforms, 2008

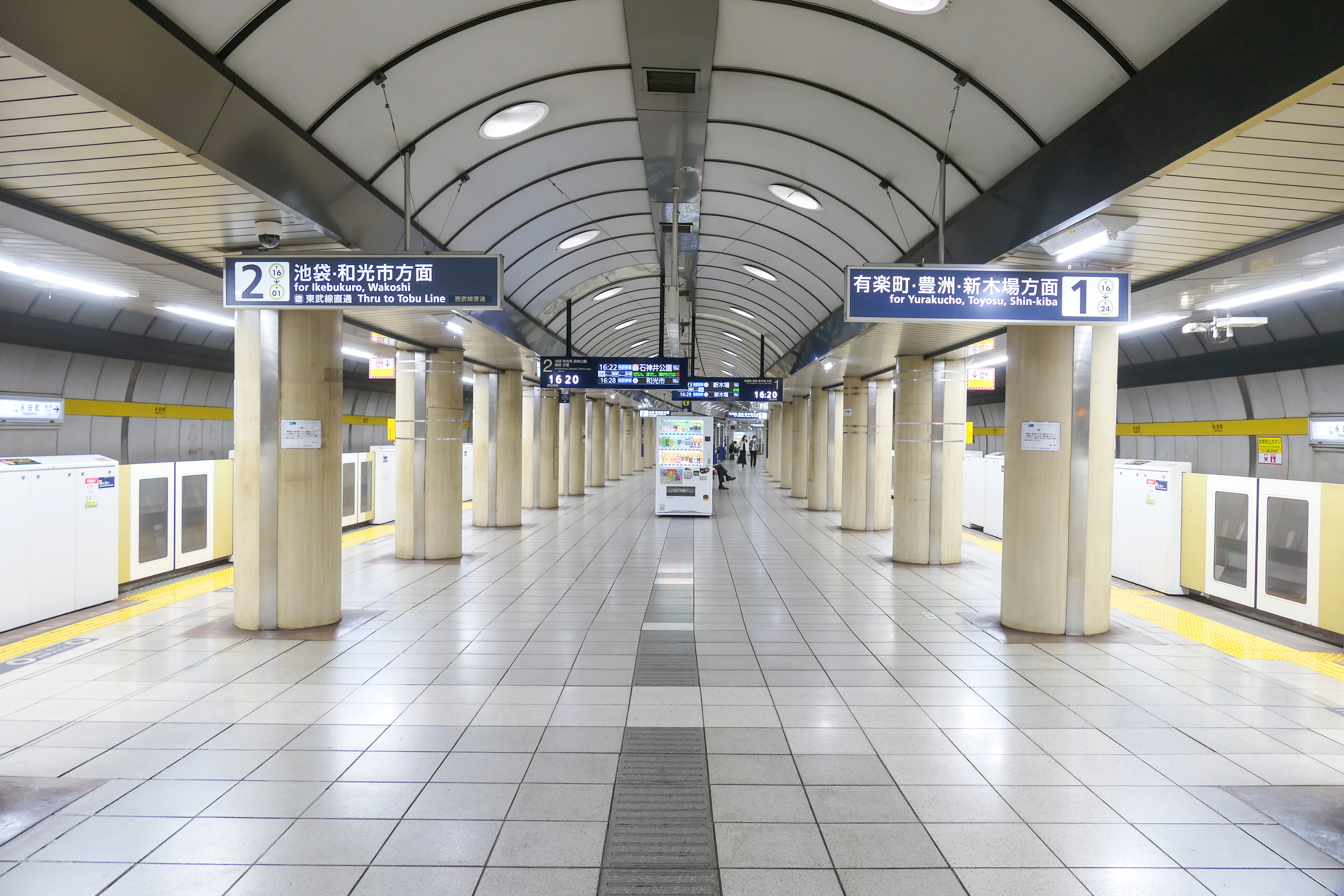
Yūrakuchō Line platforms, 2023

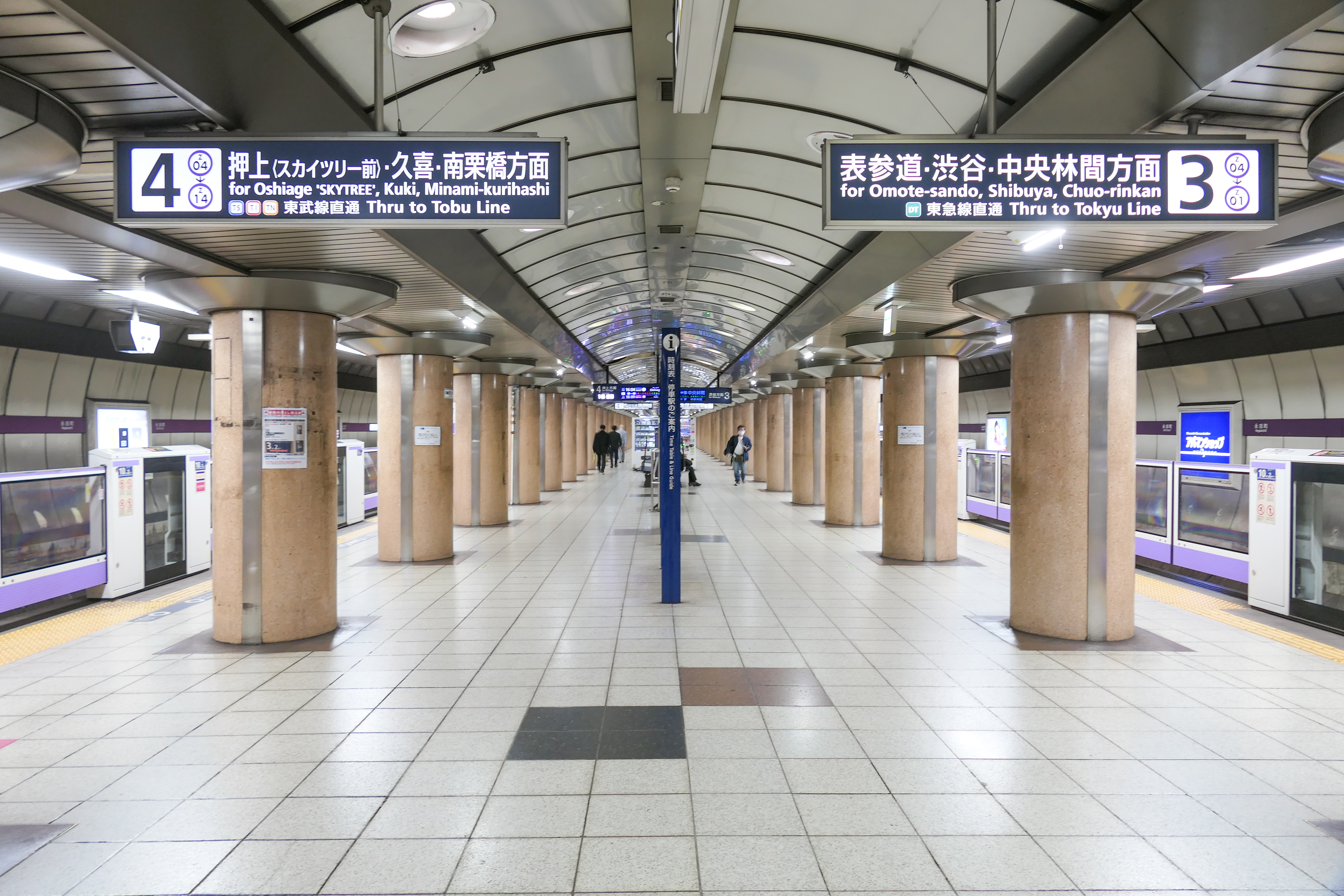
Hanzōmon Line platforms, 2023

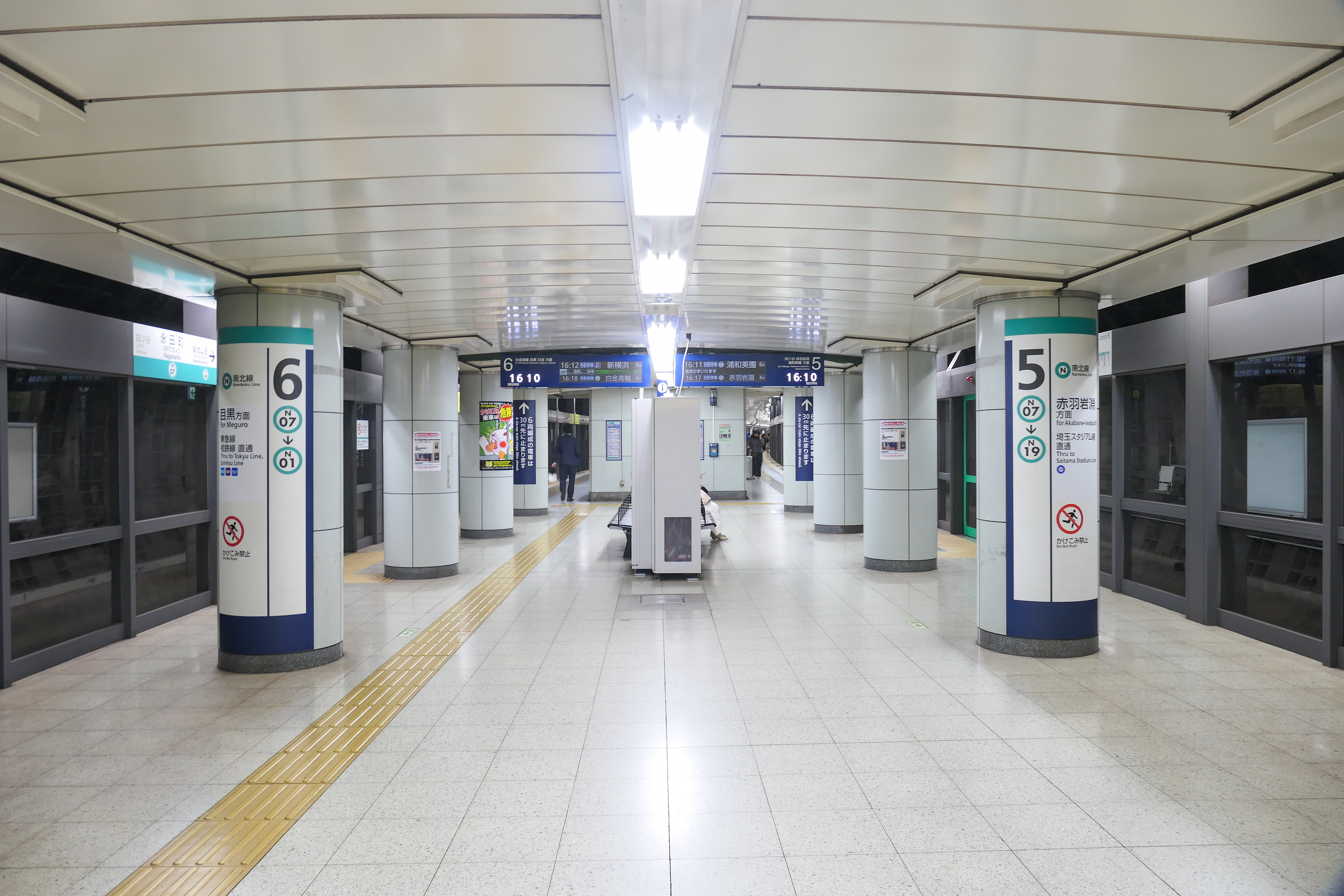
Namboku Line platforms, 2023

=== Platforms ===
1
Yūrakuchō Line
for Yūrakuchō, Toyosu, and Shin-kiba
2
for Ikebukuro, Kotake-mukaihara, and Wakoshi
Tobu Tojo Line for Shinrinkōen
Seibu Ikebukuro Line for Hannō
3
Hanzōmon Line
for Shibuya
Den-en-toshi Line for Chūō-Rinkan
4
for Otemachi and Oshiage
Tobu Skytree Line for Tōbu-Dōbutsu-Kōen
Tobu Isesaki Line for Kuki
Tōbu Nikkō Line for Minami-Kurihashi
5
Namboku Line
for Nagatacho, Komagome, and Akabane-iwabuchi
Saitama Railway Line for Urawa-Misono
6
- for Shirokane-takanawa and Meguro
- Meguro Line for Hiyoshi
- Tokyu Shin-Yokohama Line for Shin-Yokohama Station
- Sotetsu Main Line for Ebina via the Tokyu/Sotetsu Shin-Yokohama Line

== Passengers ==
In fiscal 2019, this station had 91,240 passengers daily.

== History ==
The station was opened on October 30, 1974 by the Teito Rapid Transit Authority (TRTA), as part of the original section of the Yūrakuchō Line between Ikebukuro and Ginza-itchōme. The Hanzōmon Line platforms opened on September 21, 1979, as a terminus of the line from Nagatsuta (on the Tōkyū Den-en-toshi Line); it became a through station when the line was extended to Hanzōmon on December 9, 1982. The Namboku Line platforms opened on September 30, 1997.

The station facilities were inherited by Tokyo Metro after the privatization of the Teito Rapid Transit Authority (TRTA) in 2004.

== Surrounding area ==
- Diet of Japan
- National Diet Library
- Supreme Court of Japan
- Headquarters of the Liberal Democratic Party (Japan)
- Akasaka Excel Hotel Tokyu
- Akasaka Prince Hotel
  - Tokyo Garden Terrace
- Hotel New Otani
- Hibiya High School
- Japan Center for Asian Historical Records
