= Kōjimachi Station =

Metro station in Tokyo, Japan

Kojimachi Station 麹町駅

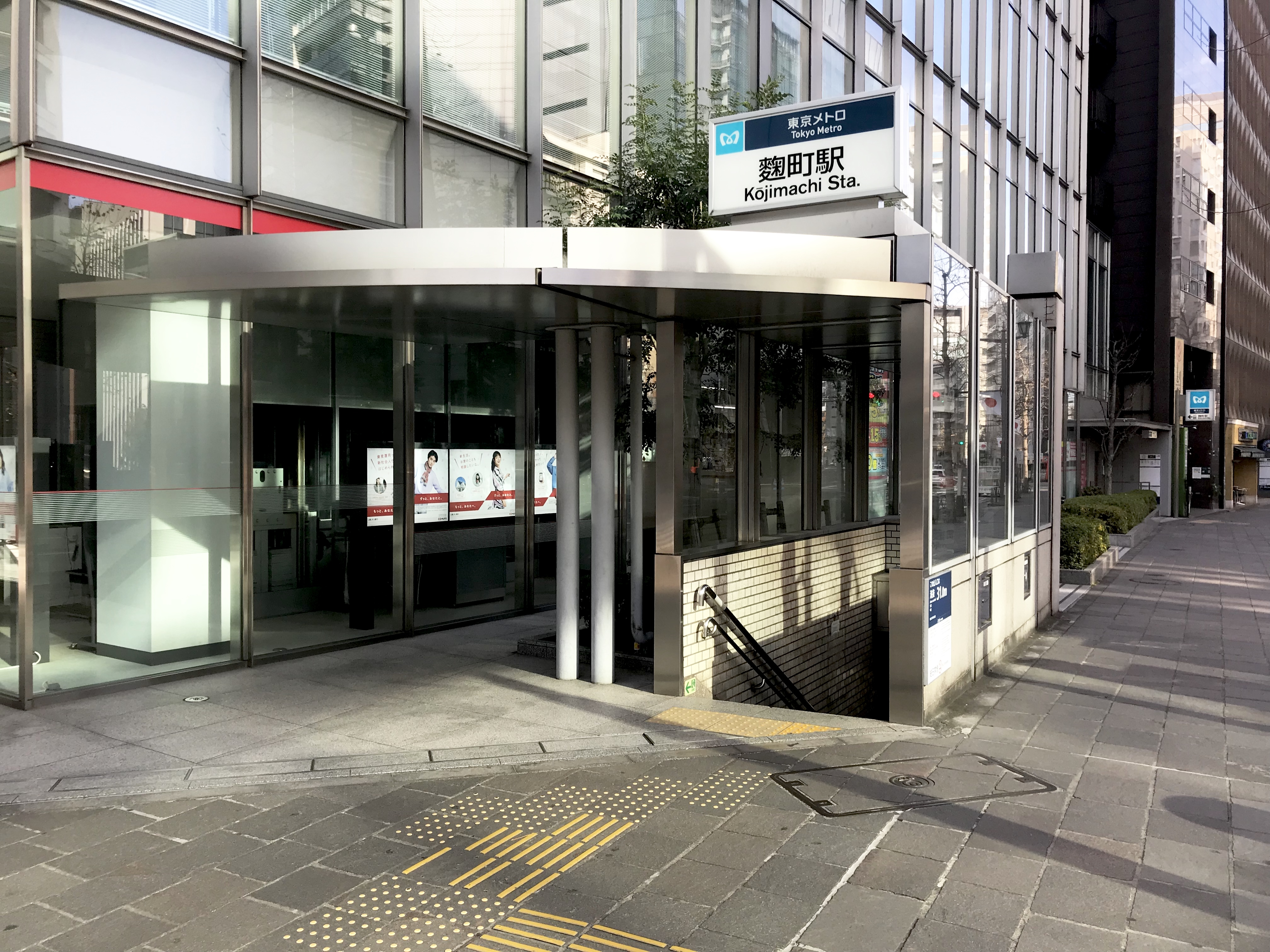
- Exit 1 in January 2019

Japanese name
- Shinjitai: 麹町駅
- Kyūjitai: 麴甼驛
- Hiragana: こうじまちえき

General information
- Other names: Japanese: 麴町駅
- Location: 3-2-saki Kojimachi, Chiyoda City, Tokyo; Japan
- Coordinates: 35°41′2.16″N 139°44′15.66″E
- Operator: Tokyo Metro
- Line: Yūrakuchō Line
- Platforms: 2 side platforms
- Tracks: 2

Construction
- Structure type: Underground

Other information
- Station code: Y-15

History
- Opened: 30 October 1974; 52 years ago

Passengers
- 54,889 daily

Services
Preceding station	Tokyo Metro	Following station
Ichigaya towards Wakoshi	Yūrakuchō Line	Nagatachō towards Shin-kiba
Location
- Location within Tokyo Yamanote Loop Location within Tokyo wards area Location within Japan

Kojimachi Station (麹町駅, also 麴町駅, Kōjimachi-eki) is a subway station on the Tokyo Metro Yurakucho Line in the Kōjimachi neighborhood of Chiyoda, Tokyo, Japan, operated by the Tokyo Subway operator Tokyo Metro. Its station number is Y-15.

== Lines ==
Kōjimachi Station is served by the Tokyo Metro Yūrakuchō Line.

== Station layout ==
The station consists of two side platforms, with platform 1 located on the second basement ("B2F") level and platform 2 located on the third basement "B3F" level.

1	Yūrakuchō Line	for Yurakucho, Toyosu, and Shin-kiba
2	Yūrakuchō Line	for Ikebukuro, Kotake-mukaihara, and Wakoshi; Seibu Ikebukuro Line for Hannō; Tobu Tojo Line for Shinrinkōen

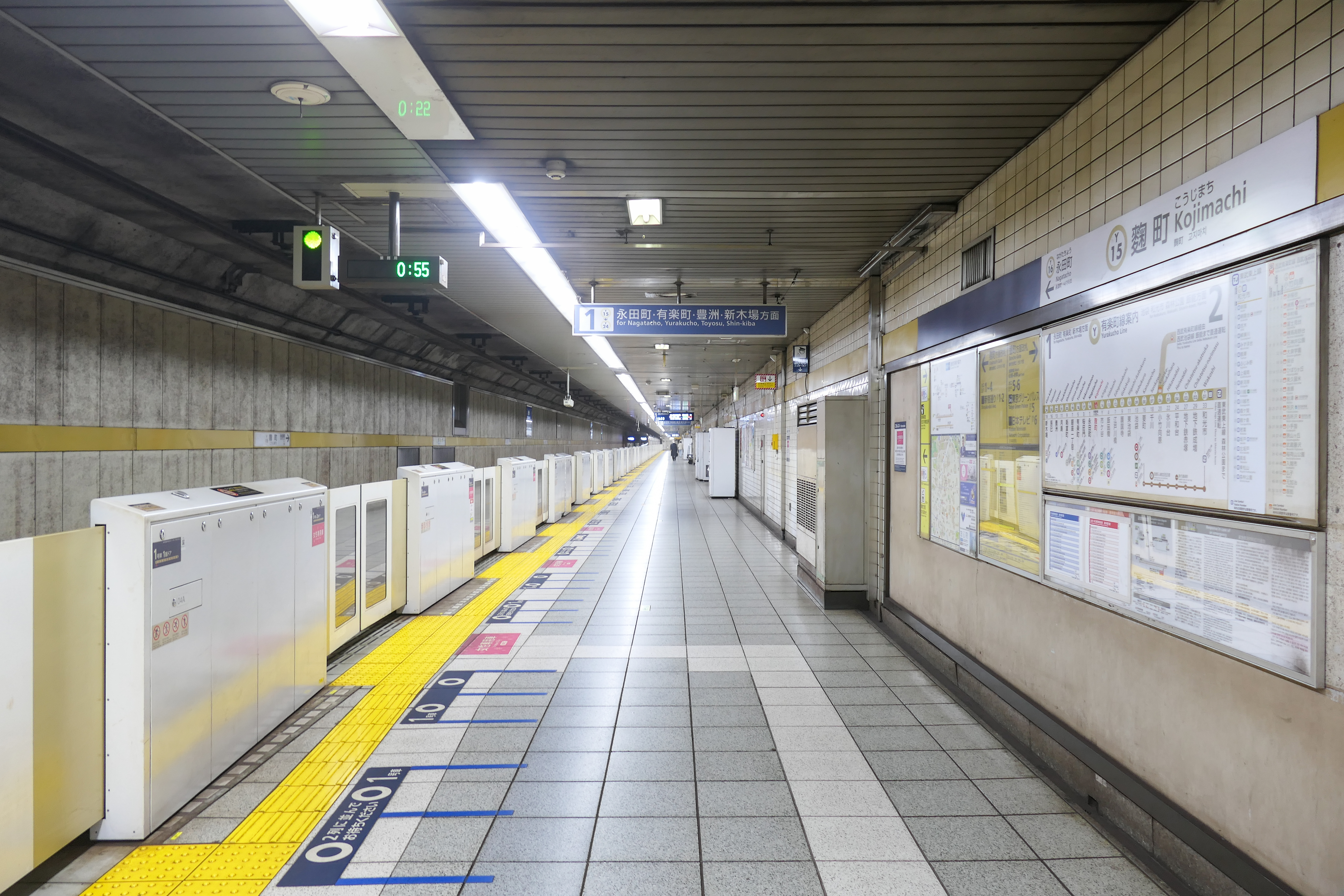
Platform 1

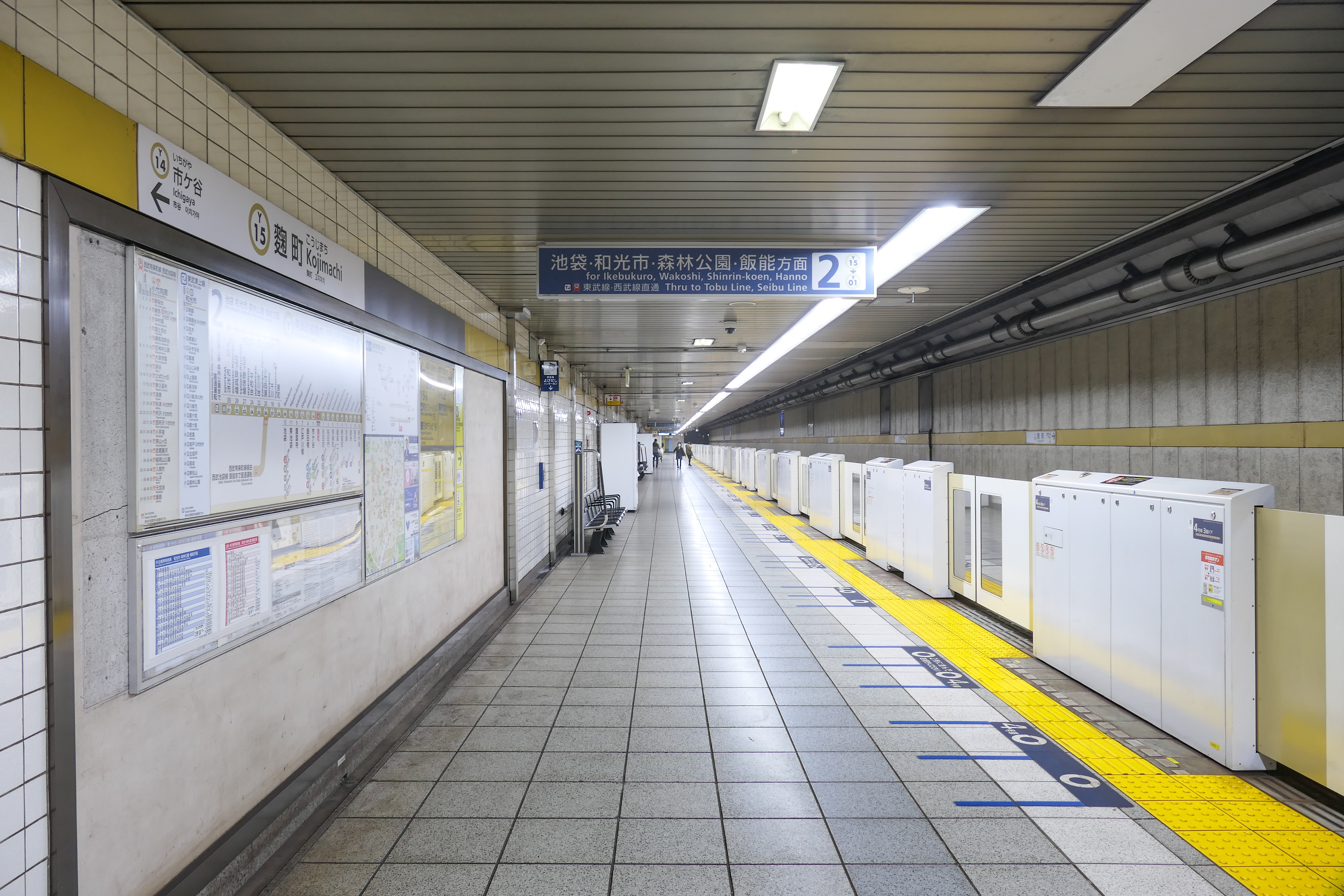
Platform 2

== History ==
The station was opened on 30 October 1974 by the Teito Rapid Transit Authority (TRTA).

== Passenger statistics ==
An average of 54,889 passengers used this station daily in fiscal 2006.

== See also ==
- List of railway stations in Japan
