= National Stadium (Tokyo) =

Demolished stadium in Tokyo, Japan

Coordinates: 35°40′41″N 139°42′53″E

- Kokuritsu Kyōgijō
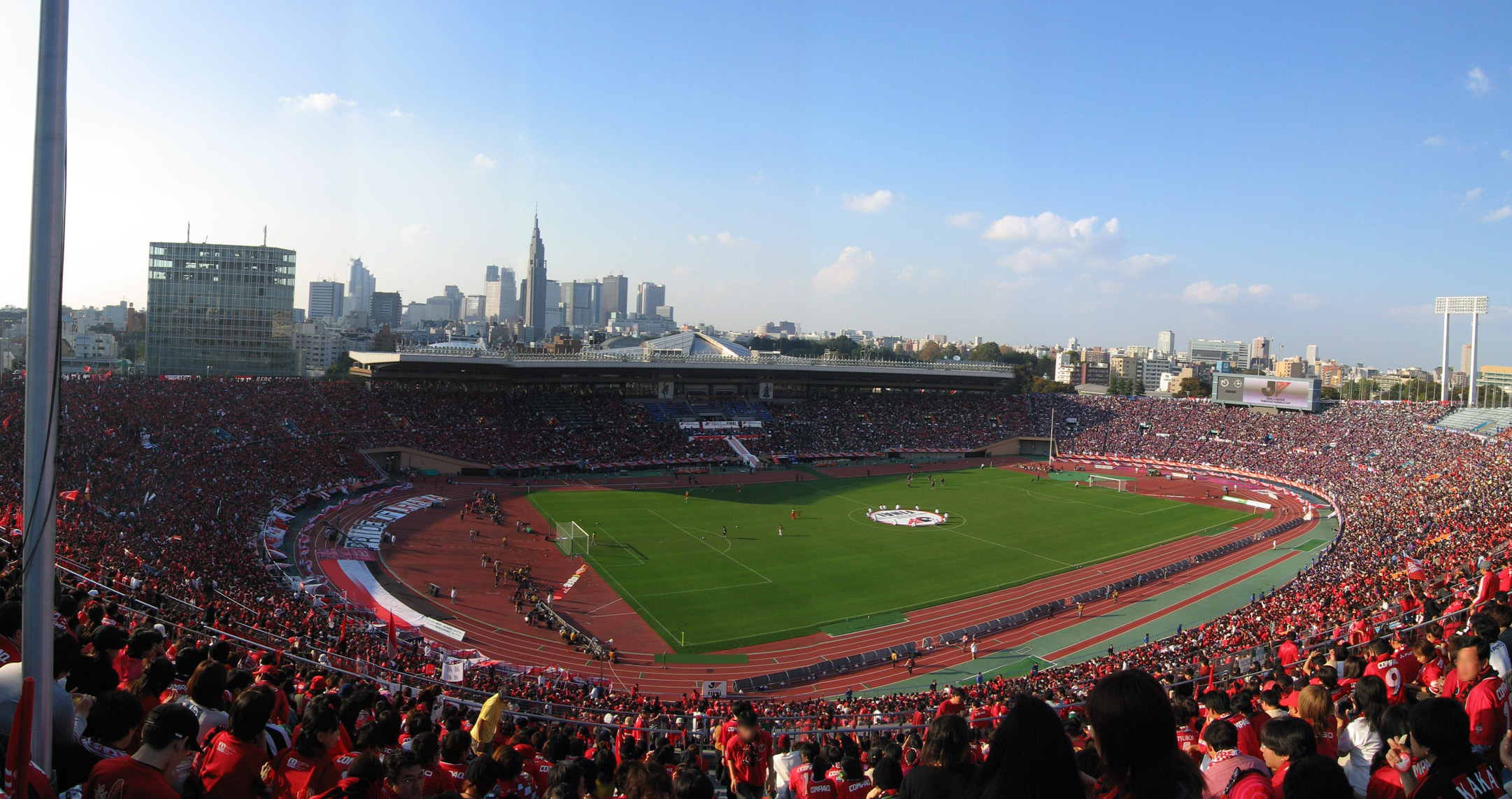
- The stadium during a J.League Cup match in 2004
- Interactive map of National Stadium
- Location: 10-2, Kasumigaoka-machi, Shinjuku, Tokyo, Japan
- Owner: Japan Sport Council
- Capacity: 48,000
- Surface: Grass
- Field size: 105 m × 68 m (344 ft × 223 ft)
- Public transit: Kokuritsu-Kyōgijō; JB12 Sendagaya

Construction
- Opened: March 1958; 68 years ago
- Closed: 31 May 2014; 12 years ago
- Demolished: May 2015; 11 years ago (aged 57)
- Architect: Mitsuo Katayama

The former National Stadium (国立競技場, Kokuritsu kyōgijō) was a multi-purpose stadium in Kasumigaoka, Shinjuku, Tokyo, Japan. The stadium served as the main stadium for the opening and closing ceremonies, as well as being the venue for track and field events at the 1964 Summer Olympics. The Japan national football team's home matches and major football club cup finals were held at the stadium. The stadium's official capacity was 57,363, but the seating capacity was only 48,000 seats.

Demolition was completed in May 2015, and the site was redeveloped with a new larger-capacity Olympic Stadium. The new stadium was the main venue for the 2020 Summer Olympics and Paralympics.

The original plans for the new stadium were scrapped in July 2015 by Japanese prime minister Shinzo Abe, who announced a rebid after a public outcry because of increased building costs. As a result, the new design was not ready for the 2019 Rugby World Cup, as originally intended. A new design created by architect Kengo Kuma was chosen in December 2015 to replace the original design and was completed in November 2019.

== History ==
The stadium was completed in 1958 as the Japanese National Stadium on the site of the former Meiji Shrine Outer Park Stadium. Its first major event was the 1958 Asian Games.

The venue was unscathed by the 2011 Tōhoku earthquake and tsunami. Yasuhiro Nakamori, international relations director for the Japanese Olympic Committee, told Around the Rings he attributed the lack of damage to Japan's stringent building codes.

The National Stadium has also held a number of music concerts in the past: The Three Tenors (Luciano Pavarotti, Plácido Domingo, and Jose Carreras) in 1996, SMAP in 2005, Dreams Come True in 2007, Arashi (15 concerts between 2008 and 2013), L'Arc-en-Ciel in 2012, Momoiro Clover Z in 2014, AKB48 in 2014, and finally, the Joint concert "Sayonara National Stadium Final Week Japan Night" on 28 & 29 May 2014, which served as final goodbye to the stadium before being demolished, with artists such as Ikimono-gakari, Gospellers, Sukima Switch, Naoto Inti Raymi, Funky Kato, Sekai no Owari, Perfume, Man with a Mission, L'Arc-en-Ciel, among others.

== Notable events ==
- 1958: Asian Games
- 1964: Summer Olympics
- 1967: Summer Universiade
- 1967–2013: Emperor's Cup final
- 1976–1979: Japan Bowl
- 1979: FIFA World Youth Championship
- 1980–2001: Intercontinental Cup
- 1982 College Football Clemson University vs Wake Forest University in the Mirage Bowl
- 1991: World Championships in Athletics
- 1993: J.League Opening Match (Verdy Kawasaki vs Yokohama Marinos)
- 1993: FIFA U-17 World Championship
- 1996: The Three Tenors Concert
- 2002: PRIDE Shockwave/Dynamite!!
- 2003: Japan Top League Opening Match
- 2005–2008: FIFA Club World Cup
- 2009: AFC Champions League Final
- 2010: AFC Champions League Final
- 2014: AKB48 Tandoku Haru Con in Kokuritsu Kyougiba ~Omoide wa Zenbu Koko ni Sutete Ike!~

== Transportation ==
Access to the stadium was from Sendagaya or Shinanomachi stations along the JR Chūō-Sōbu Line; from Kokuritsu Kyogijo Station on the Toei Oedo Line; and from Gaienmae Station on the Tokyo Metro Ginza Line.

Events
Preceded by Stadio Olimpico; Rome	Summer Olympics; Opening and Closing Ceremonies; 1964	Succeeded by Estadio Olímpico Universitario; Mexico City
Preceded by Stadio Olimpico; Rome	Olympic Athletics competitions Main Venue; 1964	Succeeded by Estadio Olímpico Universitario; Mexico City
Preceded by Stadio Flaminio; Rome	Summer Olympics; Football Men's Finals; 1964	Succeeded by Estadio Azteca; Mexico City
Preceded by Two-legged finals	Intercontinental Cup; Final Venue; 1980–2001	Succeeded by International Stadium Yokohama; Yokohama
Preceded by Two-legged finals	AFC Champions League; Final Venue; 2009, 2010	Succeeded by Jeonju World Cup Stadium
Preceded by Bielefelder Alm; Bielefeld	FIFA U-20 Women's World Cup; Final Venue; 2012	Succeeded by Olympic Stadium; Montreal
