= Aoyama-itchōme Station =

Metro station in Tokyo, Japan

Aoyama-itchome Station 青山一丁目駅

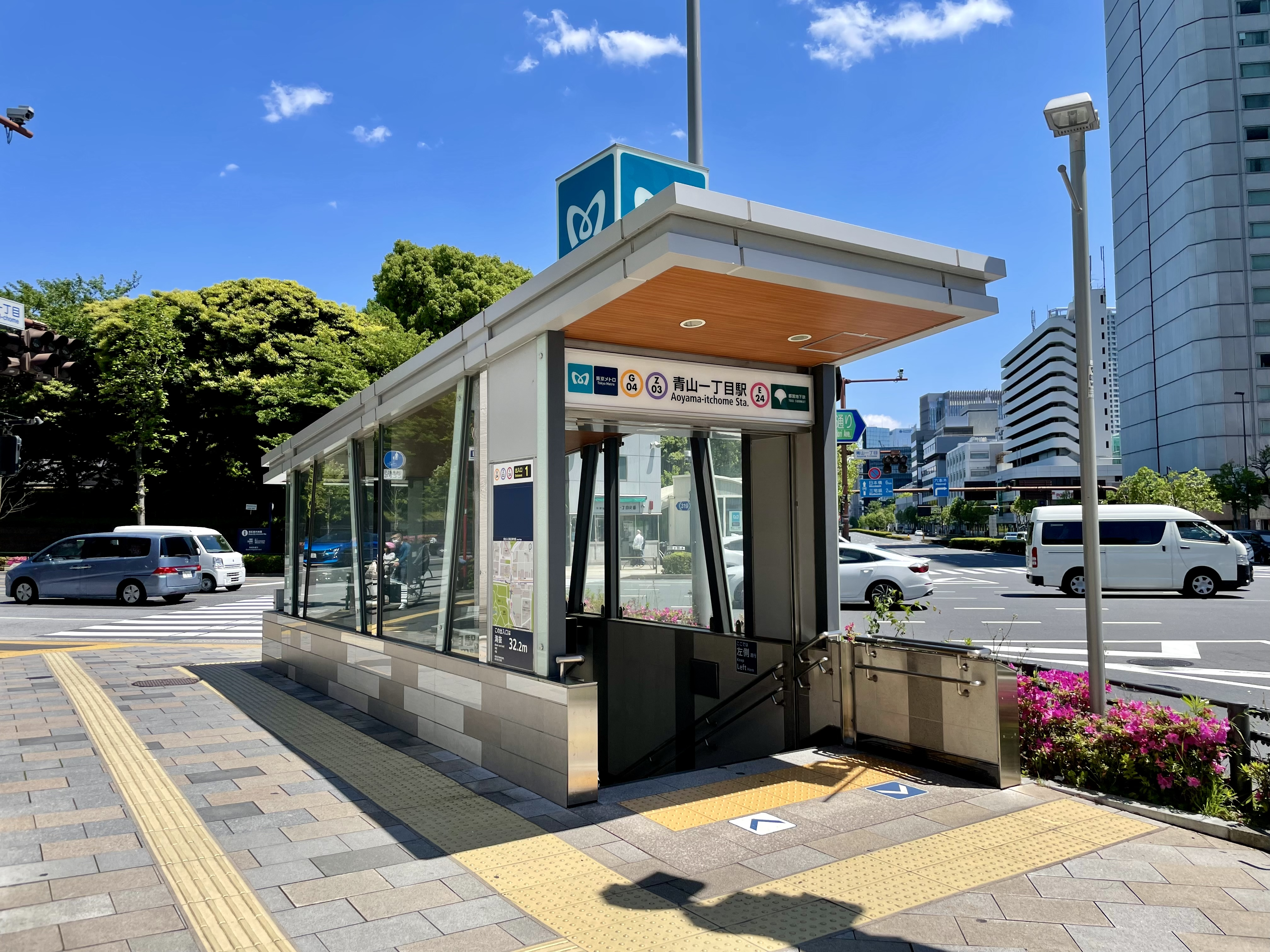
- Exit1 in May 2022

Japanese name
- Kyūjitai: 青山一丁目駅
- Literal meaning: Blue Mountain Avenue One Station

General information
- Location: 1-1-19 Minami-Aoyama (Tokyo Metro); 1-2-4 Kita-Aoyama (Toei), Minato, Tokyo; Japan
- Coordinates: 35°40′23″N 139°43′27″E
- Operator: Tokyo Metro; Toei Subway
- Lines: Ginza Line; Hanzōmon Line; Ōedo Line
- Platforms: 2 side platforms (Ginza); 1 island platform (Hanzomon and Ōedo Line)
- Tracks: 4

Construction
- Structure type: Underground

Other information
- Station code: G-04, Z-03, E-24

History
- Opened: 18 November 1938; 87 years ago

Services
Preceding station	Tokyo Metro	Following station
Gaiemmae towards Shibuya	Ginza Line	Akasaka-mitsuke towards Asakusa
Omotesandō towards Shibuya	Hanzōmon Line	Nagatachō towards Oshiage
Preceding station	Toei Subway	Following station
Kokuritsu-Kyōgijō towards Hikarigaoka	Ōedo Line	Roppongi towards Tochōmae
Location
- Location within Tokyo Yamanote Loop Location within Tokyo wards area Location within Japan

Aoyama-itchōme Station (青山一丁目駅, Aoyama-itchōme-eki) is a subway station in Minato, Tokyo, Japan operated by Tokyo Metro and Tokyo Metropolitan Bureau of Transportation (Toei).

== History ==
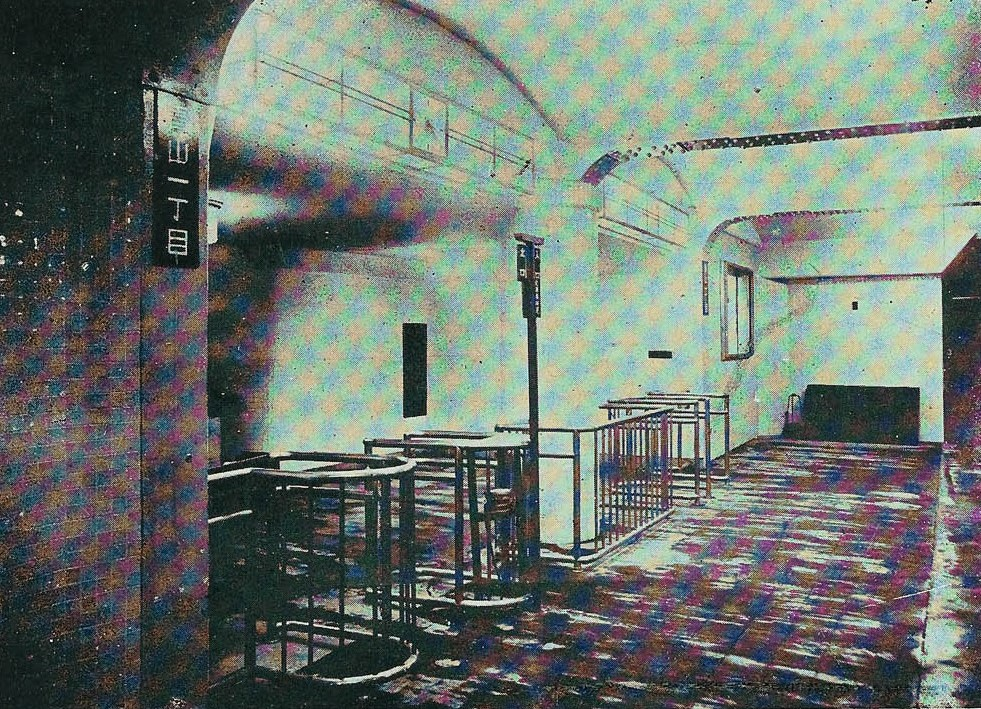
Ticket gates of Aoyama-itchōme Station in the late 1930s.

- November 18, 1938: Tokyo Rapid Railway (later Ginza Line) station opens.
- August 1, 1978: Hanzōmon Line station opens.
- December 12, 2000: Ōedo Line station opens.
- April 1, 2004: The station facilities of the Hanzomon and Ginza Lines were inherited by Tokyo Metro after the privatization of the Teito Rapid Transit Authority (TRTA).
- September 15, 2016: This station is featured in the game Persona 5. Ren Amamiya uses this station to go to school and arrives at this station coming home. It is believed he used the Ginza Line to travel to and from school.

== Lines ==
Aoyama-itchome Station is served by the Tokyo Metro Ginza Line, Tokyo Metro Hanzōmon Line, and Toei Ōedo Line.

== Station layout ==
There is a passage linking the Hanzōmon Line and Ōedo Line. Transfer from the Ginza Line to Ōedo Line is via the Hanzōmon Line platform.

=== Tokyo Metro platforms ===
The Ginza Line station consists of two side platforms serving two tracks. The Hanzōmon Line station consists of one island platform serving two tracks.

1	Ginza Line	for Shibuya
2	Ginza Line	for Akasaka-mitsuke, Ginza, Ueno, and Asakusa
3	Hanzōmon Line	for Shibuya; Tokyu Den-en-toshi Line for Chūō-rinkan
4	Hanzomon Line	for Otemachi and Oshiage; Tobu Skytree Line for Tōbu-Dōbutsu-Kōen; Tobu Isesaki Line for Kuki; Tōbu Nikkō Line for Minami-Kurihashi

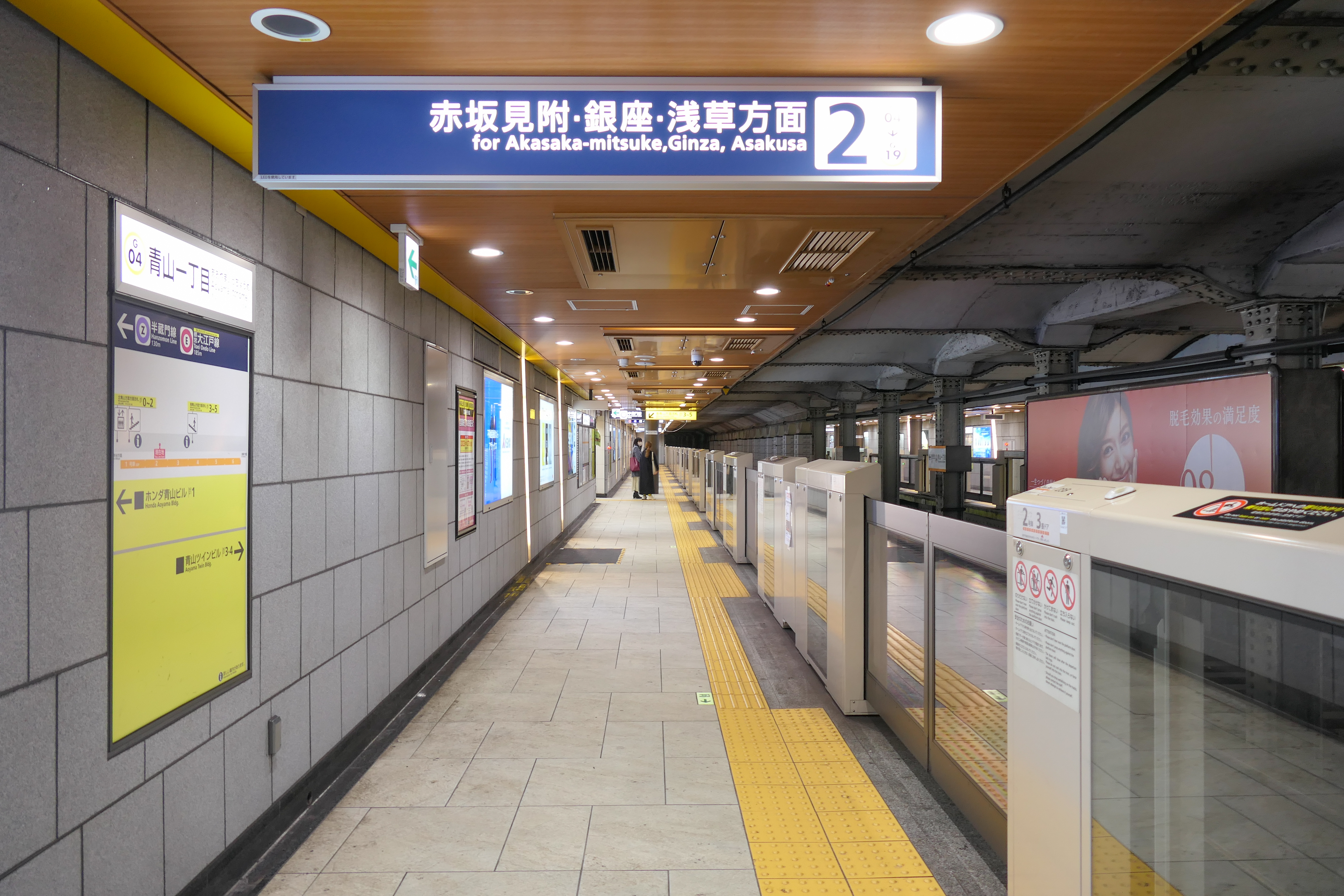
Ginza Line platform

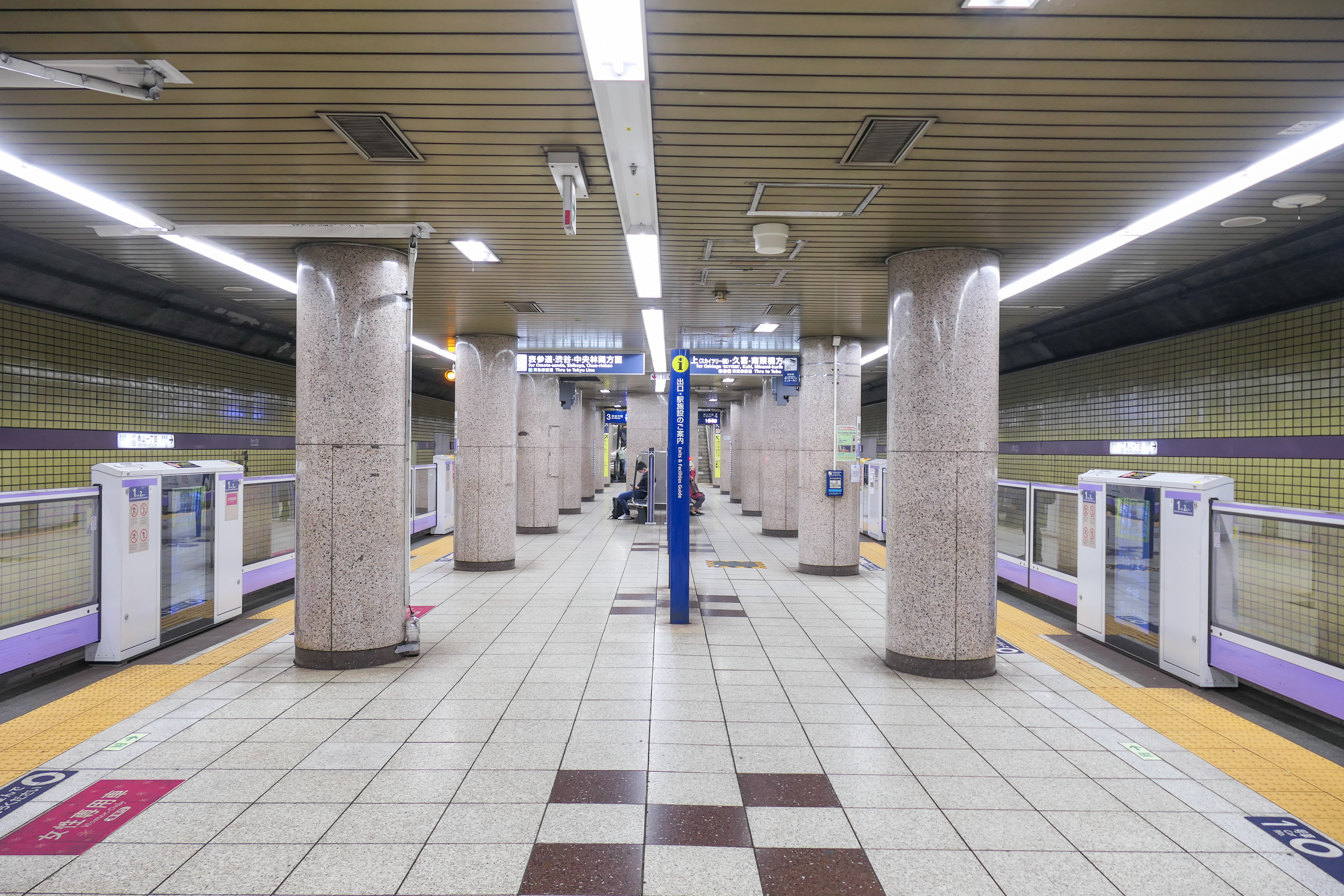
Hanzomon Line platform

=== Toei platforms ===
1	Ōedo Line	for Roppongi and Daimon
2	Ōedo Line	for Shinjuku, Tochomae and Hikarigaoka

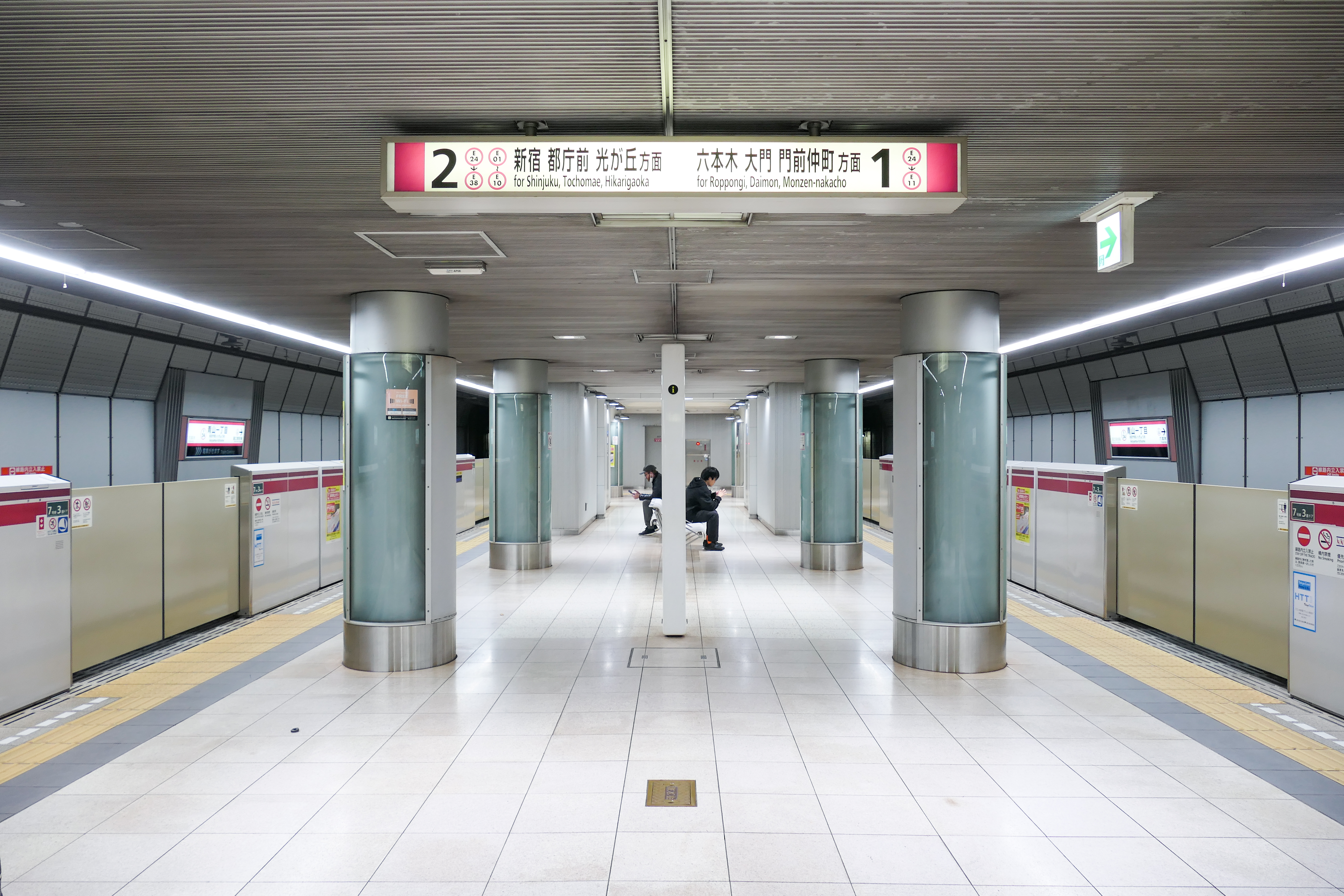
Oedo Line platform

== Surrounding area ==
- Akasaka Palace
- Tōgū Palace (Tōgū Gosho, the official residence of Crown Prince Naruhito and Crown Princess Masako. Neighboring residence occupied by the Japanese Imperial Family)
- Toraya Confectionery
- Honda Motor
- Park Court Akasaka The Tower
- Meiji Shrine Outer Gardens (明治神宮外苑 (Meiji Jingu Gaien))
  - Chichibunomiya rugby stadium
  - Meiji-Jingu Stadium (baseball stadium)
  - National Stadium
- Aoyama Cemetery
