= National Stadium station =

National Stadium station may refer to:

- National Stadium BTS station in Bangkok
- Kokuritsu-Kyōgijō Station in Tokyo, which translates as 'national stadium station'
