= Prudential Tower (Tokyo) =

Coordinates: 35.6760°N 139.7386°E

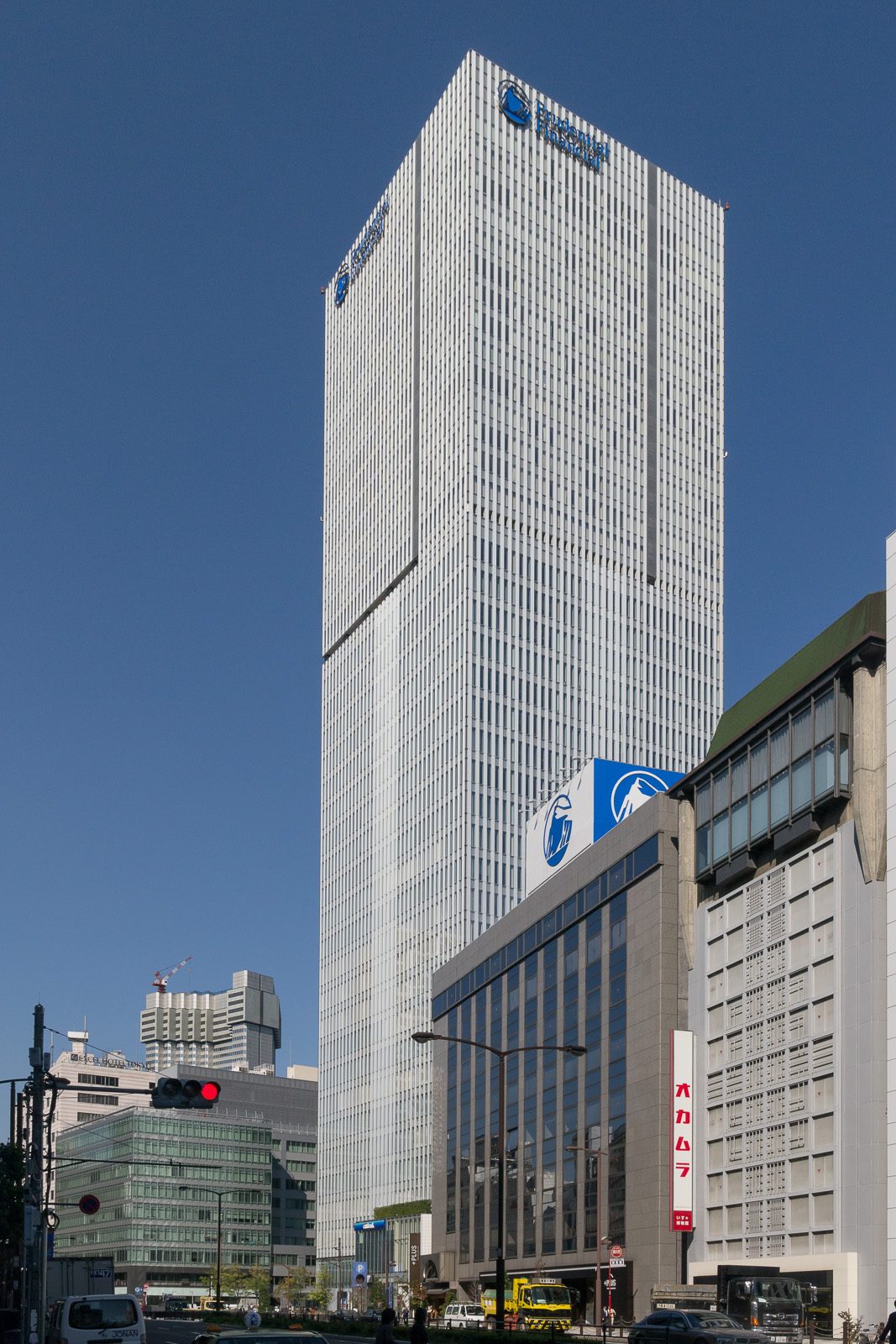
- Interactive map of the Prudential Tower area

General information
- Status: Completed
- Type: Offices, shops, residential
- Location: Nagatachō, Japan
- Construction started: 1999
- Completed: 2002
- Owner: Mori Building

Height
- Roof: 158.35 m (519.5 ft)
- Top floor: 38

Technical details
- Floor count: 41 (38 above ground, 3 underground)
- Floor area: 76,634.30 m^{2} (824,884.7 sq ft)

Design and construction
- Architect: Taisei Corporation

The Prudential Tower (プルデンシャルタワー) is a skyscraper located in Nagatachō, Chiyoda, Tokyo, Japan. It contains offices, residences, and shops, with 38 floors above ground and a total floor area of 76,634 square meters. It is situated on the Sotobori-dōri trunk road, near the National Diet Building and other central government institutions, including the Prime Minister's Official Residence.

Floors 26–38 of this mixed-use building are residential, floors 3–24 offices, and the bottom floors retail space. The building can be accessed from five subway lines through the Tokyo Metro stations Akasaka-mitsuke and Nagatachō.

== History ==
Prior to and during World War II, the site was occupied by a luxury Japanese restaurant that was one of the command bases used by dissident military officers during the February 26 Incident in 1936. The restaurant was destroyed during the bombing of Tokyo in 1945.

Aiichirō Fujiyama's business conglomerate planned to build a luxury apartment complex on the site after the war, but the award of the 1964 Summer Olympics to Tokyo led to a "hotel boom" in the city. The site was re-purposed for the Hotel New Japan, one of the first modern hotels in Tokyo, which opened in 1960 and became a center of political, social and media activity in Tokyo during the 1960s and 1970s. The hotel was severely damaged in February 1982 after a guest smoking in bed started a fire, which spread quickly due to a combination of inadequate safety equipment and inadequate staff response, killing 33 people. The Tokyo metropolitan government ordered the hotel closed shortly thereafter, although the hotel's basement nightclub, New Latin Quarter, remained operational through 1989. There are urban legends that the Prudential Tower is haunted by ghosts as a result of the disaster.

Chiyoda Life Insurance, a major creditor of the hotel's bankrupt owner, acquired the long-abandoned hotel site in 1996 and began development of an office tower on the site. Chiyoda itself entered bankruptcy in 2000, following which Prudential Life Insurance acquired the project and completed construction through cooperation with Mori Building. Construction of the 158-meter tower was finished in 2002.
