= Meiji Jingu Stadium =

Baseball stadium in Shinjuku, Tokyo, Japan

- 明治神宮野球場

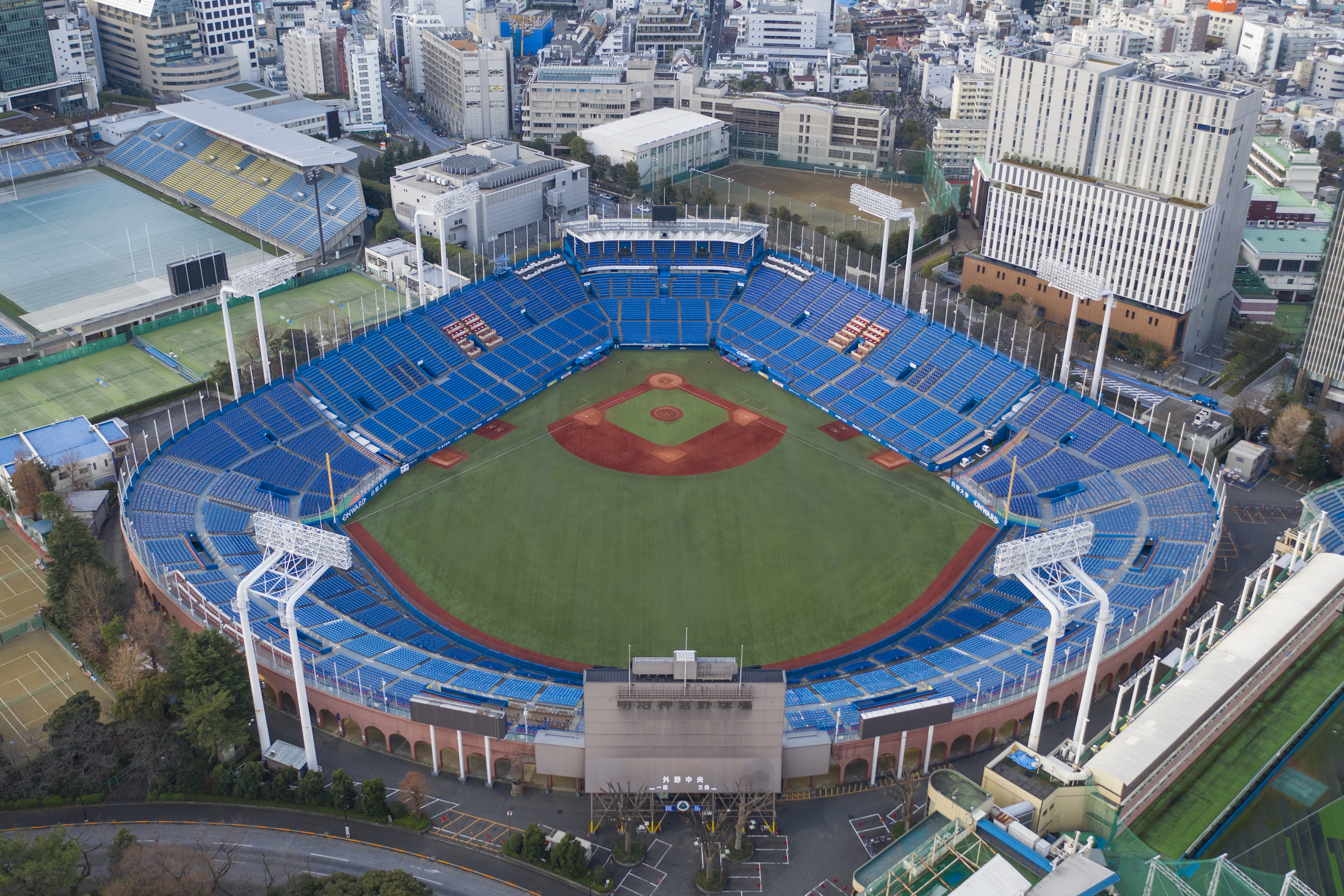
- Interactive map of Meiji Jingu Stadium
- Location: Shinjuku, Tokyo, Japan
- Coordinates: 35°40′28.3″N 139°43′01.4″E
- Owner: Meiji Shrine
- Capacity: 37,933
- Surface: Hibrid Turf Exciting
- Field size: Left Field – 97.5 metres (320 ft); Left-Center – 112.3 metres (368 ft); Center Field – 120 metres (394 ft); Right-Center – 112.3 metres (368 ft); Right Field – 97.5 metres (320 ft); Height of outfield fence – 3.5 m (11.5 ft)
- Public transit: at Sendagaya and Shinanomachi; at Gaiemmae; at Kokuritsu-Kyogijo

Construction
- Groundbreaking: December 1925
- Opened: October 23, 1926
- Cost: 530,000 Yen

Tenants
- Tokyo Big6 Baseball League (1926–present); Tohto University Baseball League (1932–present); Tokyo Yakult Swallows (Central League) (1964–present)

The Meiji Jingu Stadium (明治神宮野球場, Meiji Jingū Yakyūjō) is a baseball stadium in Shinjuku, Tokyo, Japan. It opened in 1926 and holds 37,933 spectators. Property of the Meiji Shrine, it is the home field of the Tokyo Yakult Swallows professional baseball team. It also hosts college baseball, including the Tokyo Big6 Baseball League and the Tohto University Baseball League.

Redevelopment plans call for the stadium and the adjacent Chichibunomiya Rugby Stadium to be demolished and replaced with new facilities.

== History ==
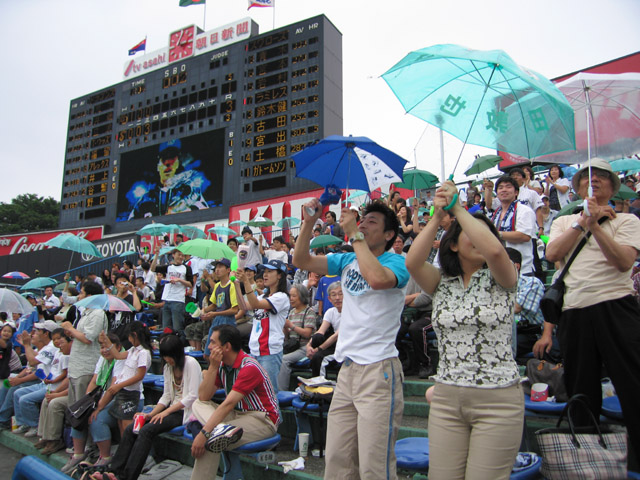
Tokyo Yakult Swallows fans in the right field bleachers performing the Swallows' iconic umbrella dance.

Game night at the stadium, 2024

As the second-oldest baseball stadium in Japan, Meiji Jingu Stadium is one of the few professional stadiums still in existence where Babe Ruth played (the only other ones are Wrigley Field in Chicago, Fenway Park in Boston, and Koshien Stadium in Hyōgo Prefecture, Japan). In 1934, Ruth joined several other famous baseball players from the U.S., such as Lou Gehrig and Jimmie Foxx, in a 22-game tour of Japan. Matsutarō Shōriki, popularly known as the father of Japanese professional baseball, organized the American tour; he survived an assassination attempt for allowing foreigners to play baseball in Jingu Stadium. He received a 16-inch-long wound from a broadsword during the assassination attempt.

In 1964, the Tokyo Yakult Swallows moved into Meiji Jingu Stadium, replacing Korakuen Stadium, mostly because the Yomiuri Giants and the then named Toei Flyers (now Hokkaido Nippon-Ham Fighters), also called Korakuen home, which made it quite overcrowded with teams. They have stayed there since.

The stadium was also used for an exhibition of baseball when Tokyo hosted the 1964 Summer Olympics. The United States team of college baseball players, including eight future major league players, defeated a Japanese amateur all-star team, 6–2.

In 2019, the Meiji Jingu Gaien, the Japan Sports Council, Mitsui Fudosan and Itochu Corp. groups agreed to redevelop both Meiji Jingu Stadium and the Chichibunomiya Rugby Stadium. Under the plans, Meiji Jingu Stadium will be demolished and rebuilt on the site of the rugby ground. The replacement rugby stadium will be built on the current site of the Meiji Jingu Stadium Number 2 field. Officials have announced that the new stadium will have a roof over the field and stands.

== In popular culture ==
Meiji Jingu Stadium makes frequent appearances in baseball-themed manga and anime, including the series Ace of Diamond and Gurazeni. The latter features the stadium's fictional home team, the "Jingu Spiders".

Meiji Jingu Stadium is mentioned in the 1937 novel How Do You Live? by Genzaburō Yoshino. The stadium is also featured in the short story The Yakult Swallows Poetry Collection by Japanese writer Haruki Murakami, from the 2020 short story collection First Person Singular.

Nogizaka46 considers Meiji Jingu Stadium their home field. Since 2014, they have visited it every year during their National Summer Tour, with the exception of 2021.

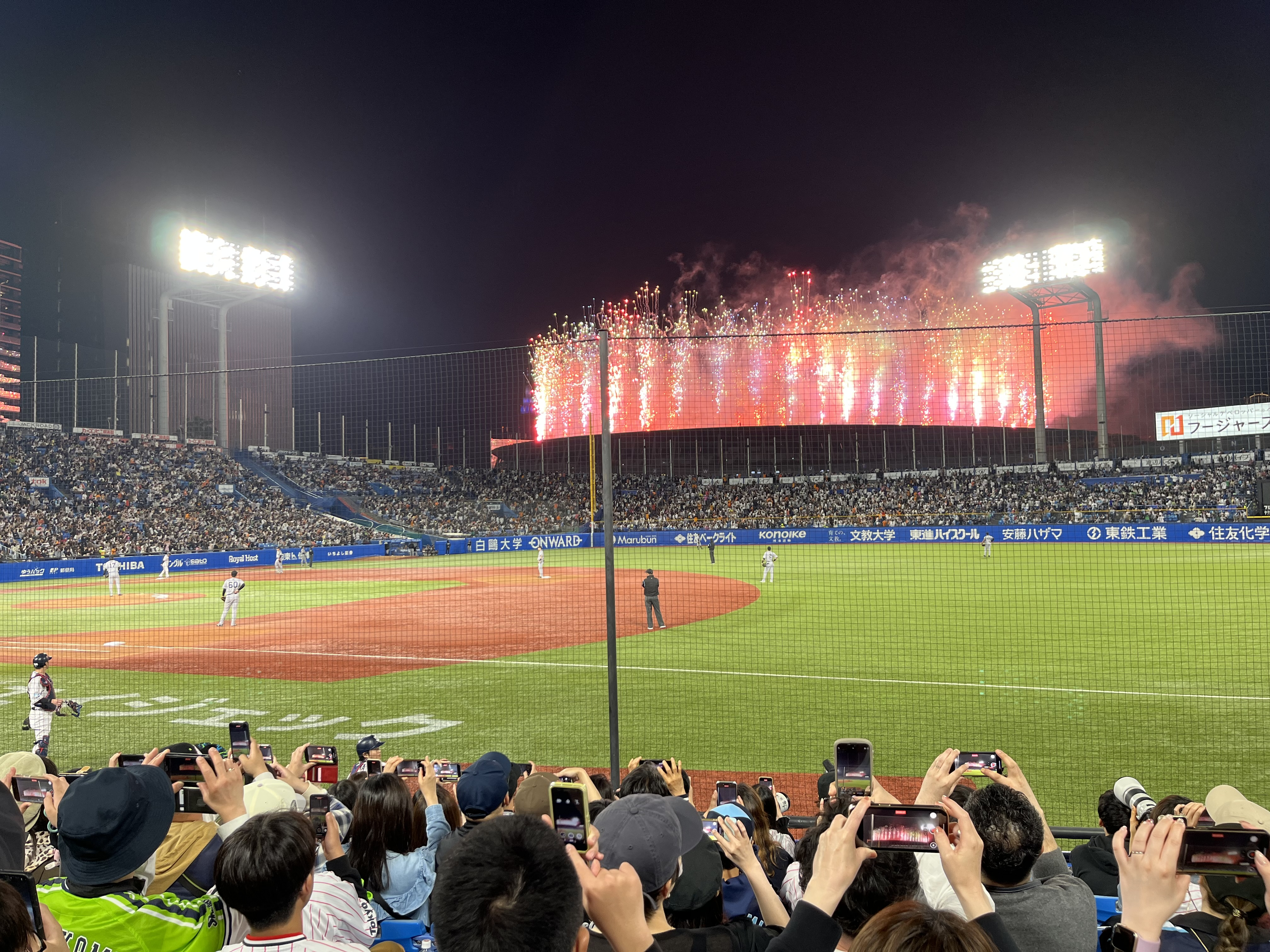
Fireworks being released from Japan National Stadium during a game between the Yomiuri Giants and Tokyo Yakult Swallows.

Meiji Jingu Stadium appears in Season 2 Episode 8 of the Love Live! Superstar!! anime. It is briefly considered for Liella!'s performance; however, their attempt to use the space is denied. Neighboring Japan National Stadium appears in Season 2 Episode 11 under the similar but fictional name "Jingu Stadium".

== Attendances ==
The home attendances of the Tokyo Yakult Swallows at the Meiji Jingu Stadium:

Season	Games	Total attendance	Average attendance
2025	72	2,011,972	27,944

Preceded by Komazawa Stadium	Home of the Toei Flyers; 1962 – 1963	Succeeded by Korakuen Stadium
Preceded by Korakuen Stadium	Home of the Tokyo Yakult Swallows; 1964 –	Succeeded by N/A
