= Gaiemmae Station =

Metro station in Tokyo, Japan

Gaiemmae Station 外苑前駅

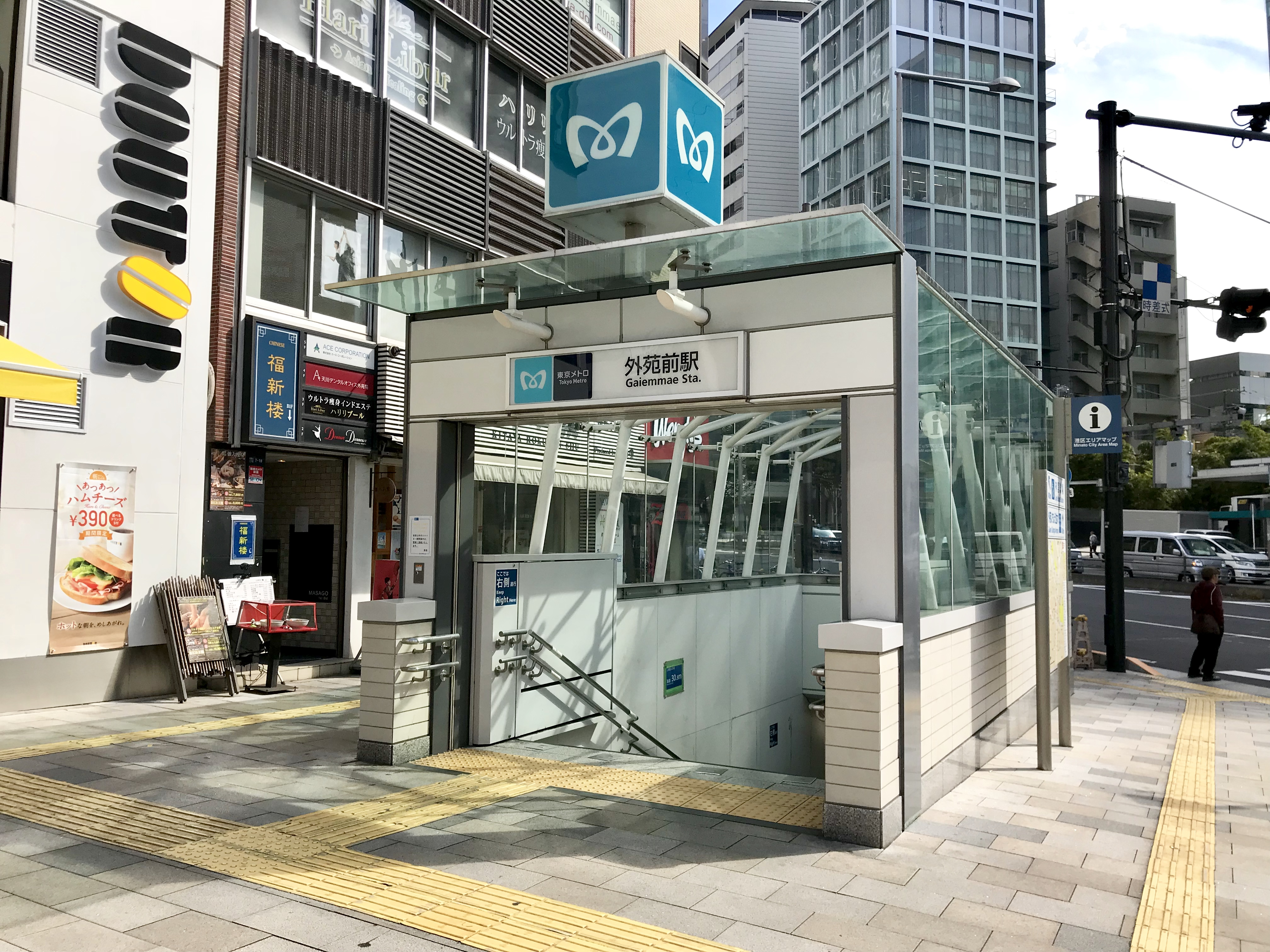
- Exit3 in October 2018

General information
- Location: 2-7-16 Kita-Aoyama, Minato, Tokyo; Japan
- Coordinates: 35.67065°N 139.718145°E
- Operator: Tokyo Metro
- Line: Ginza Line
- Platforms: 2 side platforms
- Tracks: 2

Construction
- Structure type: Underground

Other information
- Station code: G-03
- Website: www.tokyometro.jp/lang_en/station/gaiemmae/

History
- Opened: 18 November 1938; 87 years ago
- Former names: Aoyama-yonchōme (until 1939)

Passengers
- FY2016: 78,309 daily

Services
Preceding station	Tokyo Metro	Following station
Omote-sando towards Shibuya	Ginza Line	Aoyama-itchome towards Asakusa
Location
- Location within Tokyo Yamanote Loop Location within Tokyo wards area Location within Japan

Gaiemmae Station (外苑前駅, Gaienmae-eki) is a subway station on the Tokyo Metro Ginza Line in Minato, Tokyo, Japan, operated by the Tokyo subway operator Tokyo Metro.

== Lines served ==
Tokyo Metro:

- Ginza Line

== Station layout ==
The station has two side platforms serving two tracks.

=== Platforms ===
1	Ginza Line	for Shibuya
2	Ginza Line	for Akasaka-mitsuke, Ginza, Ueno, and Asakusa

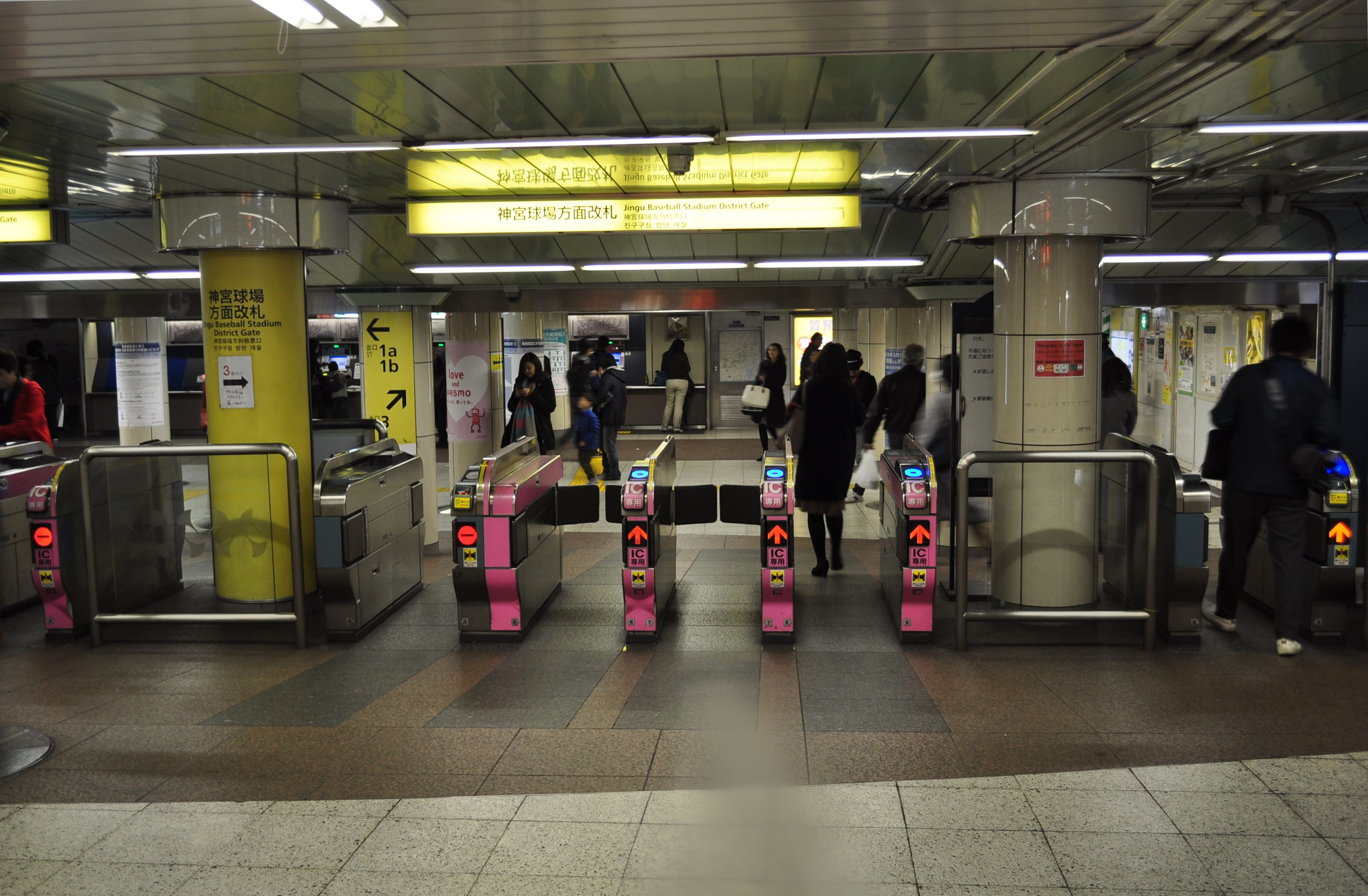
Concourse

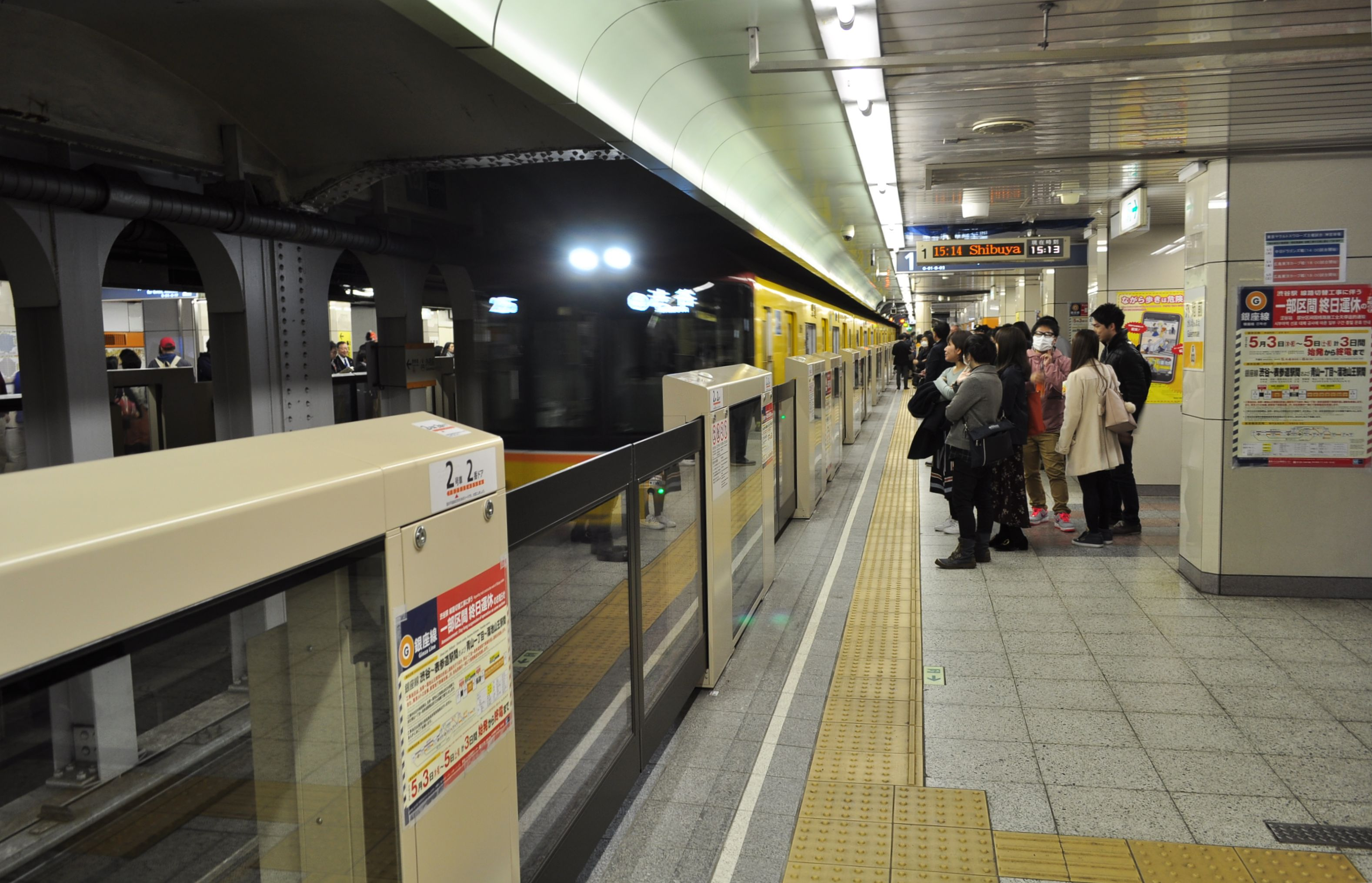
Platforms

== History ==
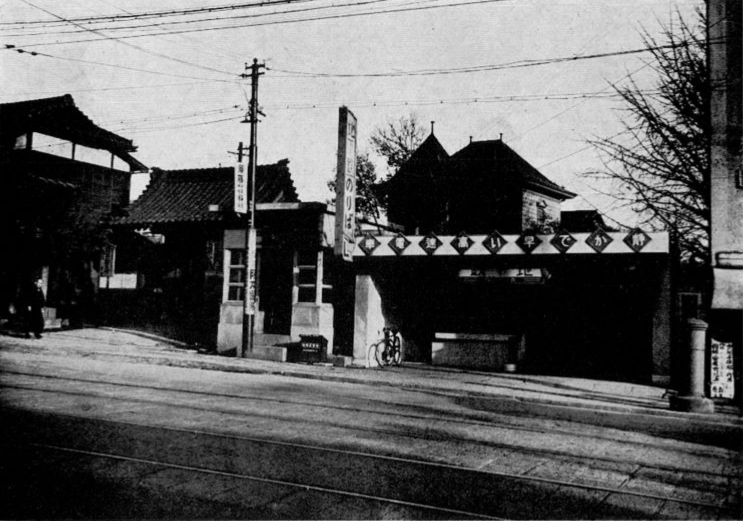
Exit of Aoyama-yonchōme Station circa 1938.

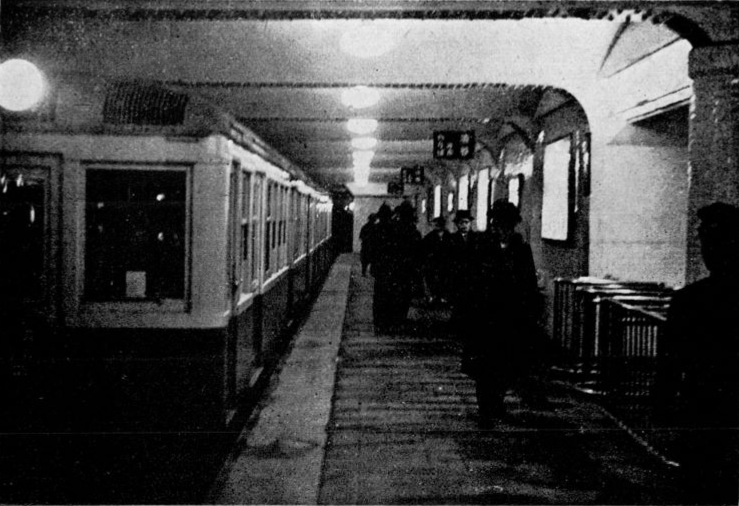
The platform

The station opened as Tokyo Rapid Railway Aoyama-yonchōme Station on November 18, 1938, and was renamed Gaiemmae in 1939.

The station facilities were inherited by Tokyo Metro after the privatization of the Teito Rapid Transit Authority (TRTA) in 2004.

== Surrounding area ==
- Watari Museum of Contemporary Art
- Itochu
- Avex
- Oracle Corporation Japan
- Aoyama Cemetery
- Paul Stuart flagship store
- Meiji Shrine Outer Gardens (明治神宮外苑 (Meiji Jingu Gaien))
  - Meiji Jingu Stadium (baseball stadium)
  - Chichibunomiya Rugby Stadium
  - National Olympic Stadium
