= Watari Museum of Contemporary Art =

Coordinates: 35.670695°N 139.713365°E

Watari Museum of Contemporary Arts
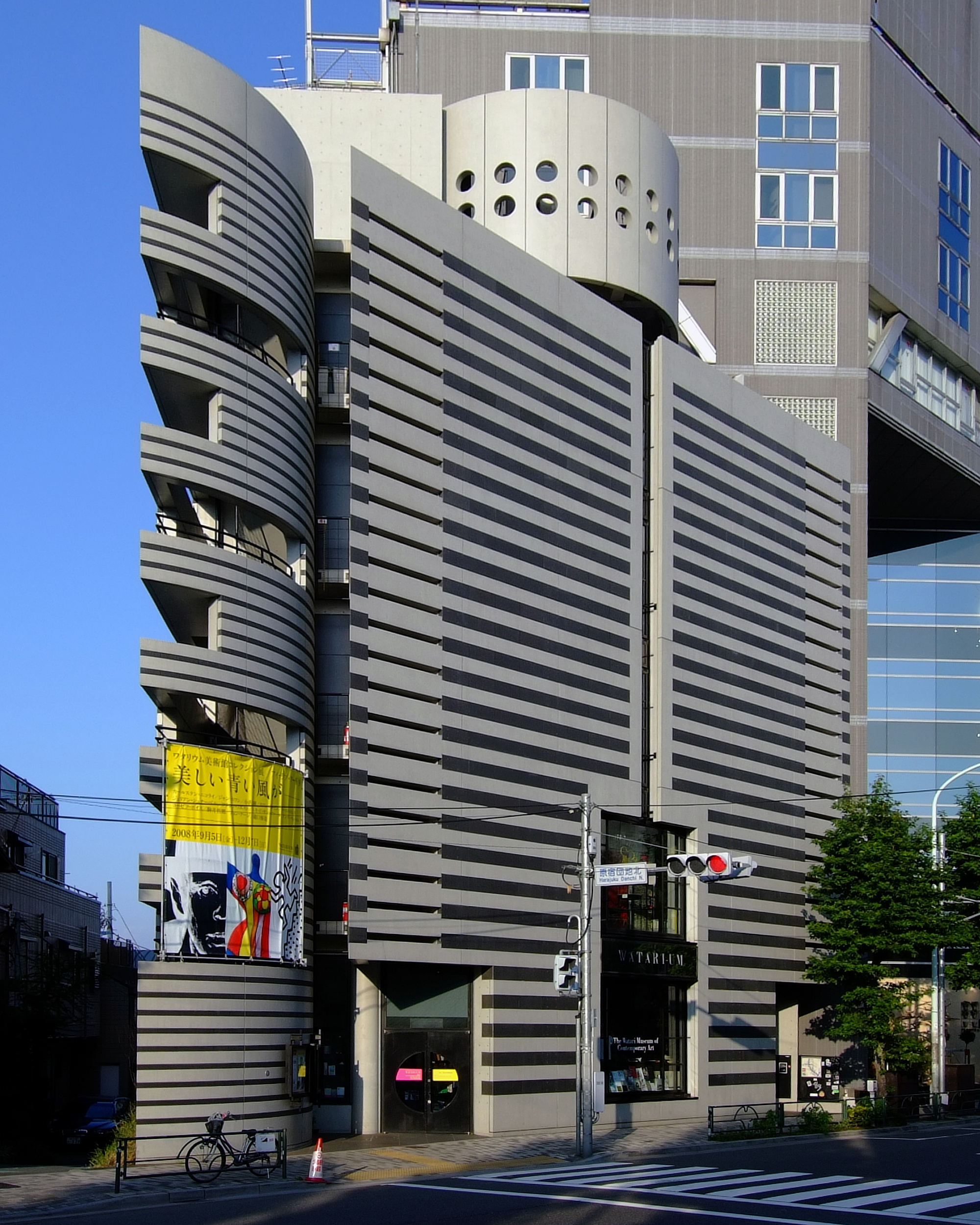
- Established: 1990
- Location: Shibuya, Tokyo, Japan
- Type: Art museum
- Website: http://www.watarium.co.jp/

The Watari Museum of Contemporary Art (ワタリウム美術館), commonly referred to as Watari-um, is a museum of contemporary art located in Shibuya, Tokyo. Founded by Shizuko Watari and opened in 1990, the museum is near Gaienmae Station on the Tokyo Metro Ginza Line.

The institution promotes conceptual art and other non-commercial artists in Japan. It began as a commercial venue known as the Galerie Watari, which showcased a range of artists such as Sol LeWitt and Nam June Paik, as well as famous pop artists Andy Warhol and Keith Haring.

The Watari-um became noted for its exhibitions of international and Japanese artists, while also reflecting on the position of Japanese art in the international context. The museum also organizes lectures, learning workshops for children, and small project room exhibitions.

== History ==
From 1972 to 1989, Shizuko Watari was the director of the Galerie Watari in Tokyo, which organized exhibitions for Japanese and international artists including Nam June Paik, Keith Haring, Marcel Broodthaers, On Kawara and Shinro Ohtake.

The gallery was expanded and became the Watari Museum of Contemporary Art. Is also known as the Watari-um, which derives from the combination of Watari and museum. The 6-story museum was designed by Swiss architect Mario Botta and opened in September 1990. The first floor is devoted entirely to the museum shop. The fourth floor offers a bird’s eye view of works displayed below, and the glass-walled mezzanine of the third floor makes for visual correspondence between artworks displayed in the exhibition rooms of the art gallery. The top floors accommodate the offices and the owner's residence.

Beginning with an exhibition of Joseph Beuys in 1991, the Watari-um became noted for its exhibitions of significant international artists. The institution also helped to establish connections between Japanese and Asian artists, through projects such as Chinese Contemporary Art 1997, which included a large-scale performance by Zhang Huan.

Large retrospective exhibitions of the artists Larry Clark, Henry Darger, Jan Fabre, Federico Herrero, Mike Kelley, John Lurie, Barry McGee, Gerda Steiner & Jörg Lenzlinger, have been held at the museum over the last few decades.
