= Akasaka-mitsuke Station =

Metro station in Tokyo, Japan

Akasaka-mitsuke Station 赤坂見附駅

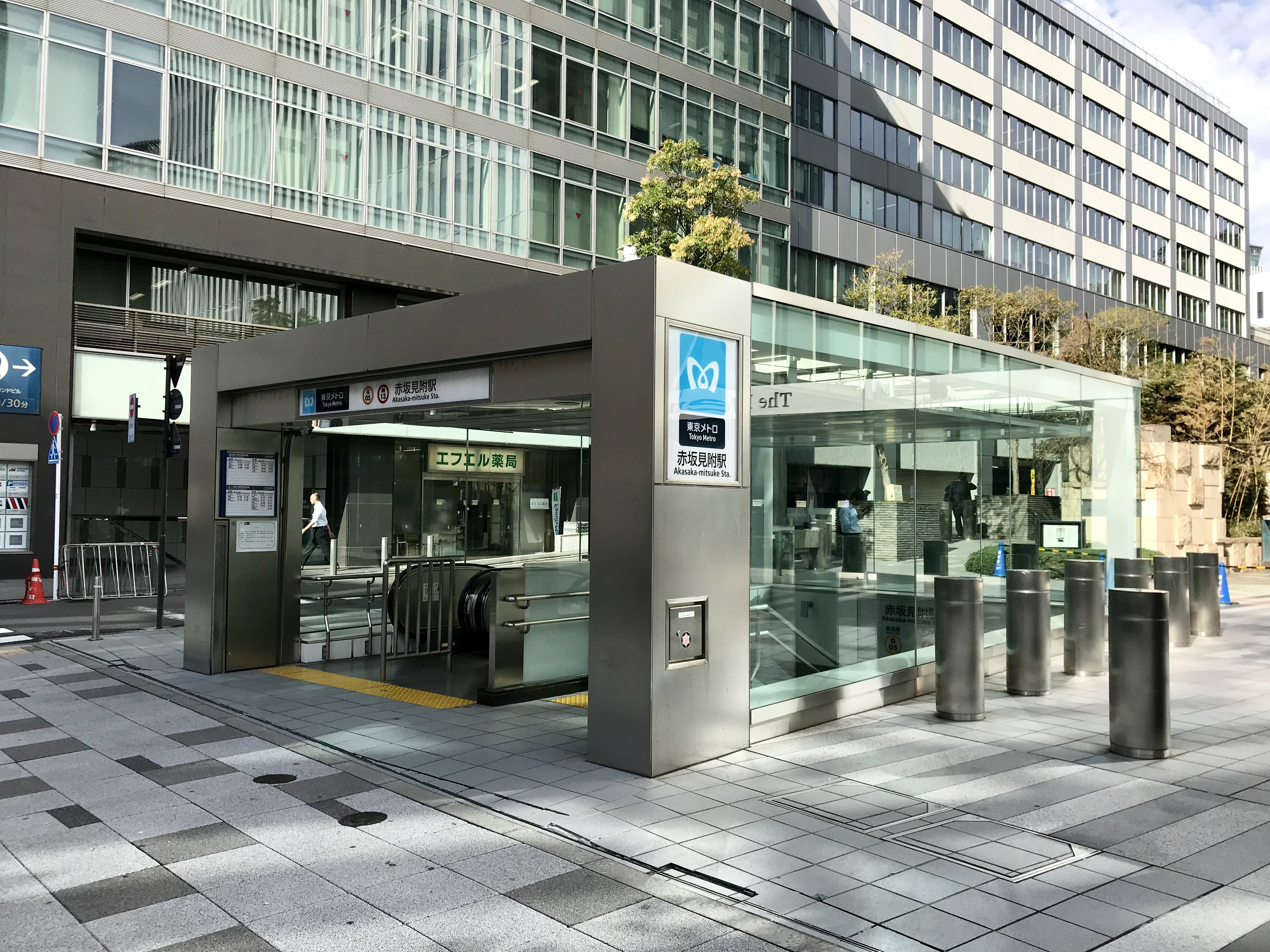
- Exit 11, October 2018

General information
- Location: 3-1-6 Akasaka, Minato-ku, Tokyo; Japan
- Coordinates: 35.676821°N 139.737119°E
- System: Tokyo subway
- Owner: Tokyo Metro Co., Ltd.
- Operator: Tokyo Metro
- Lines: Ginza Line; Marunouchi Line
- Platforms: 2 island platforms (1 on each level) cross-platform interchange
- Tracks: 4 (2 on each level)

Construction
- Structure type: Underground

Other information
- Station code: G-05, M-13
- Website: Official website

History
- Opened: 18 November 1938; 87 years ago

Services
| Preceding station | Tokyo Metro | Following station |
|---|---|---|
| Aoyama-itchōme towards Shibuya | Ginza Line | Tameike-sannō towards Asakusa |
| Yotsuya towards Ogikubo or Hōnanchō | Marunouchi Line | Kokkai-gijidō-mae towards Ikebukuro |
Location
- Location within Tokyo Yamanote Loop Location within Tokyo wards area Location within Japan

Akasaka-mitsuke Station (赤坂見附駅, Akasaka-mitsuke-eki) is a subway station in Minato, Tokyo, Japan, operated by Tokyo Metro.

== History ==
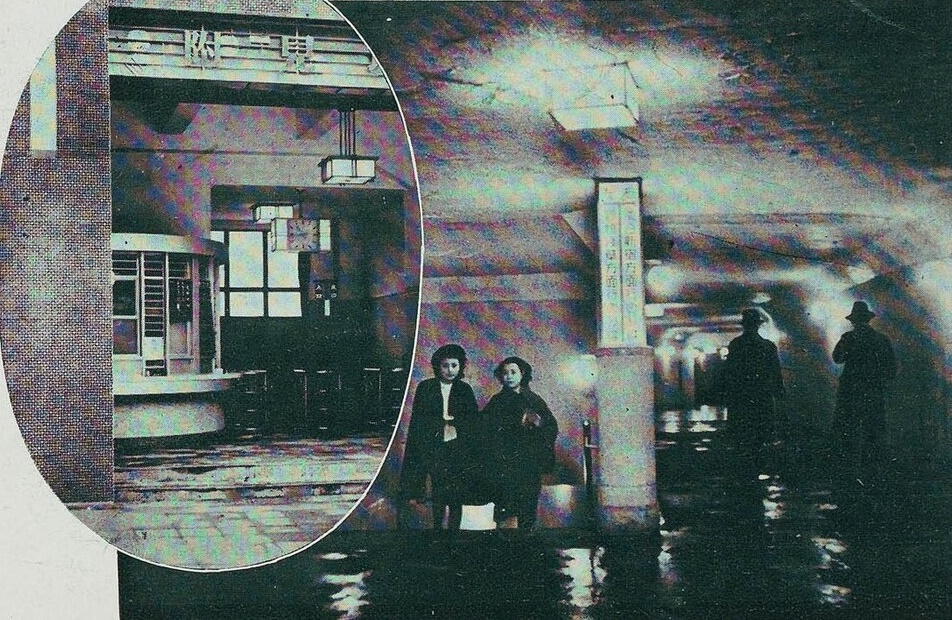
Ticket gates and station passage of Akasaka-mitsuke Station in the late 1930s.

The Tokyo Rapid Railway (later the Ginza Line) station opened on 18 November 1938. The Marunouchi Line station opened on 15 March 1959.

The station facilities were inherited by Tokyo Metro after the privatization of the Teito Rapid Transit Authority (TRTA) in 2004.

In the 2015 data available from Japan’s Ministry of Land, Infrastructure, Transport and Tourism, Akasaka Mitsuke → Tameike-Sannō was one of the train segments among Tokyo's most crowded train lines during rush hour.

== Lines ==
Akasaka-mitsuke Station is served by the Tokyo Metro Ginza Line and Tokyo Metro Marunouchi Line, providing same-platform transfers between the two lines in the same direction (for example eastbound to eastbound). Reversing directions between the lines is also fairly easy as the eastbound lines are stacked above the westbound lines. It is also connected by underground passageways to Nagatacho, which is served by the Tokyo Metro Yurakucho Line, Tokyo Metro Hanzomon Line and Tokyo Metro Namboku Line, and it is possible to transfer between the two stations without passing through the ticket gates.

== Station layout ==
The station has two island platforms serving four tracks. The Ginza Line and Marunouchi Line share platforms at this station.

| 1 | Ginza Line | for Omotesandō and Shibuya |
| 2 | Marunouchi Line | for Yotsuya, Shinjuku, and Ogikubo |
| 3 | Ginza Line | for Toranomon, Ginza, Nihombashi, Ueno, and Asakusa |
| 4 | Marunouchi Line | for Kasumigaseki, Ginza, Ōtemachi, and Ikebukuro |

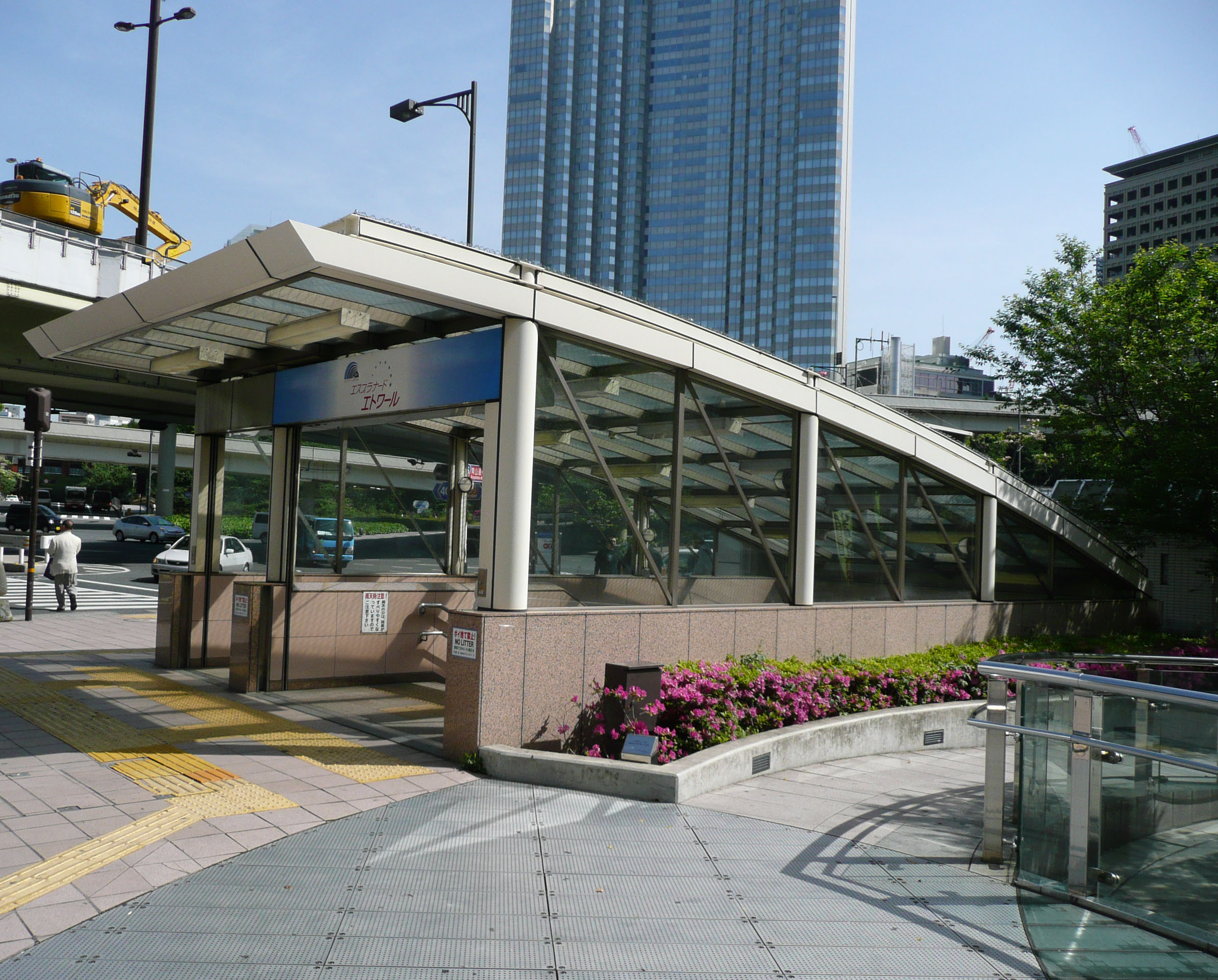
A station entrance in 2010

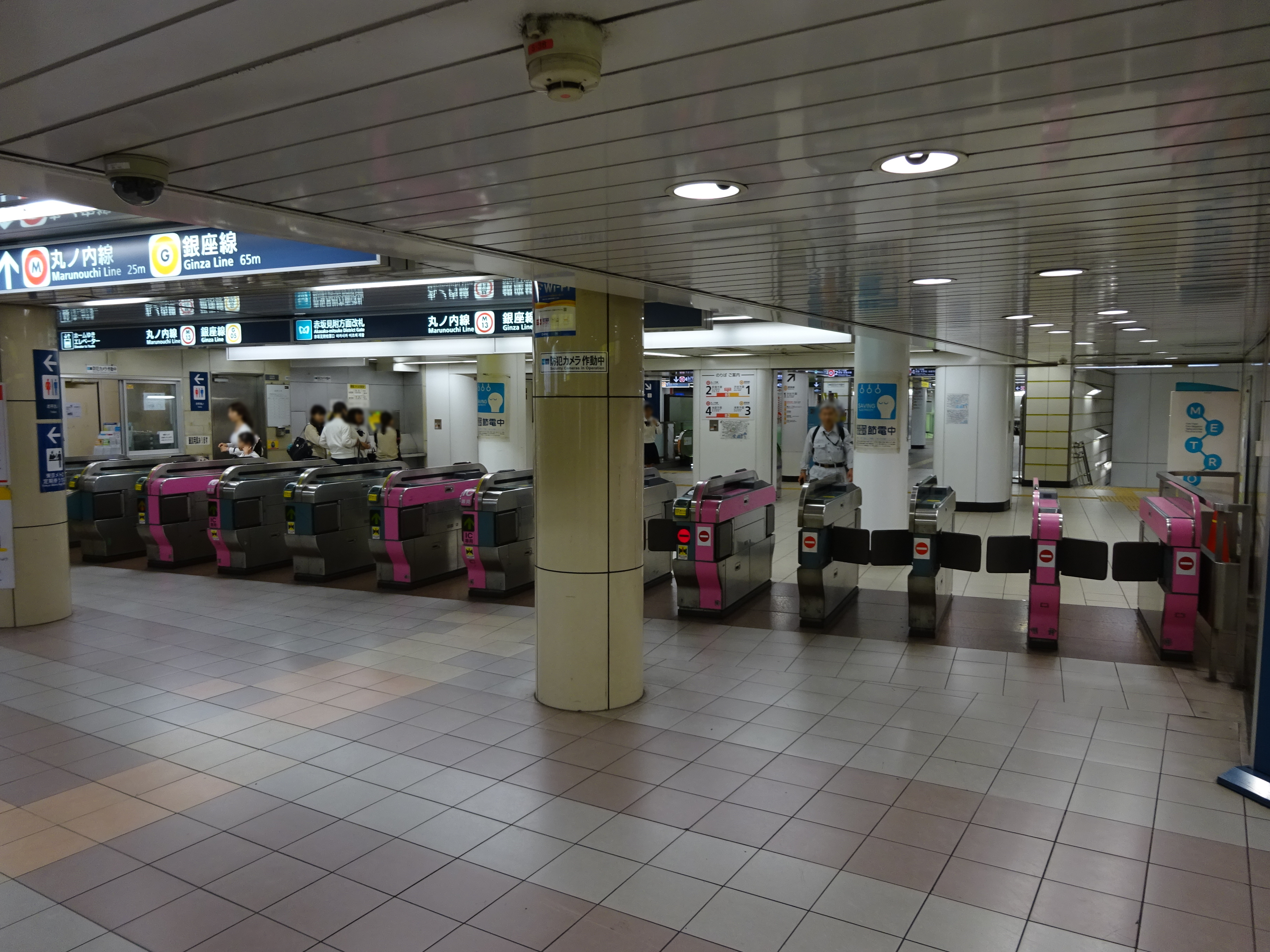
Ticket barriers in 2016

Track diagram of the station

== Surrounding area ==
- Akasaka and Nagatacho area
- Akasaka Palace
- Tōgū Palace
- Akasaka Prince Hotel
  - Tokyo Garden Terrace
- Hotel New Otani
- Akasaka Excel Hotel Tokyu
- Sanno Park Tower
- Prudential Tower in Tokyo
- Hibiya High School
- Hie Shrine
- Suntory
- Kajima
- Toraya Confectionery
- Park Court Akasaka The Tower

== See also ==
- List of railway stations in Japan
