= Park Court Akasaka The Tower =

Highrise building in Japan

- パークコート赤坂 ザ タワー
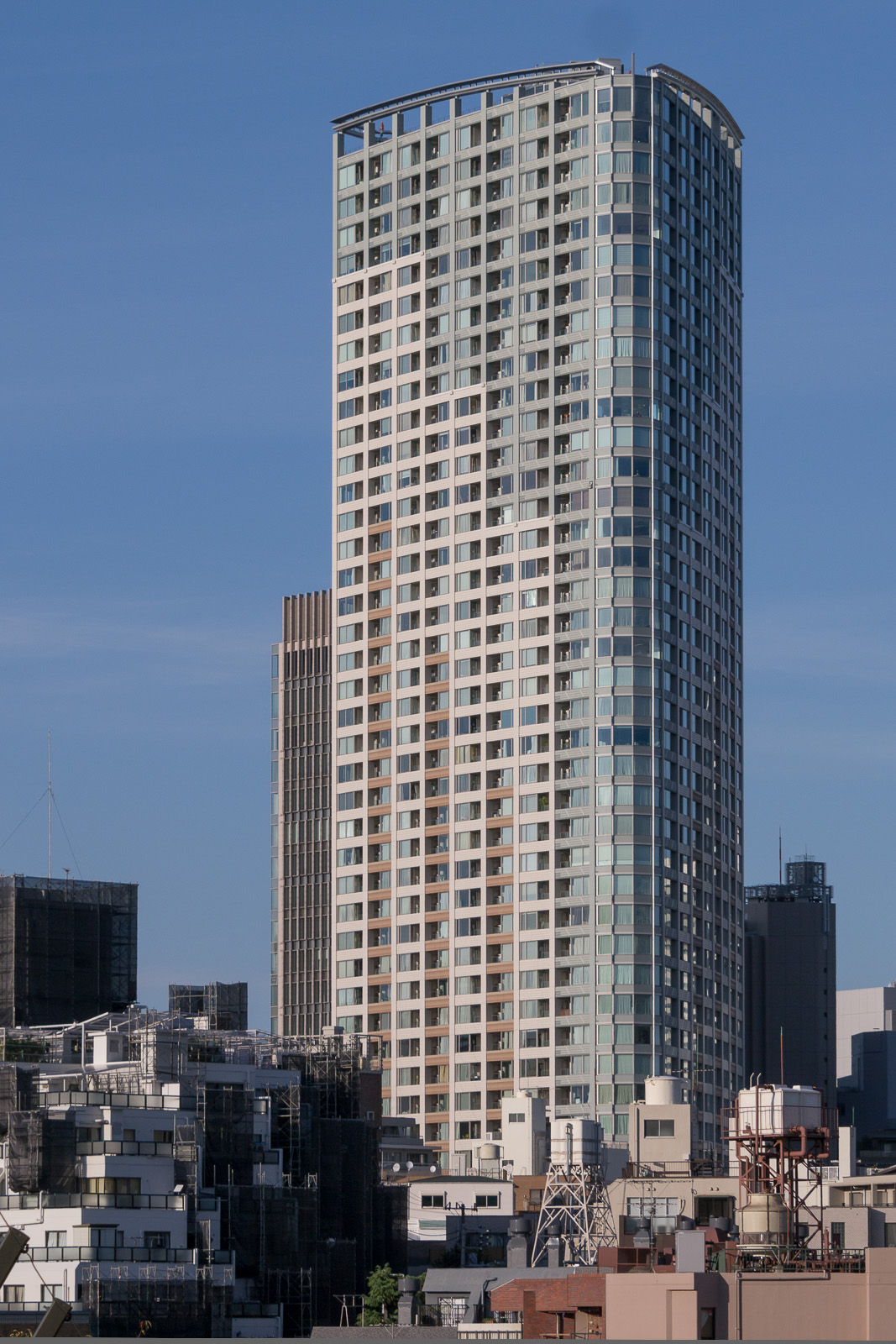
- Interactive map of the Park Court Akasaka The Tower area

General information
- Status: Completed
- Type: Residential
- Location: 4-14-14 Akasaka; Minato, Tokyo, Japan
- Coordinates: 35°40′24″N 139°43′54″E
- Construction started: 2006
- Completed: 2009
- Opening: 18 June 2009
- Owner: Mitsui Fudosan Co., Ltd

Height
- Roof: 157.25 meters (515.9 ft)

Technical details
- Floor count: 43 above ground 2 below ground
- Floor area: 71,339 m^{2} (767,890 sq ft)

Design and construction
- Developer: Mitsui Fudosan Co., Ltd
- Main contractor: Taisei Corporation

Other information
- Facilities: Sky Lounge; Rooftop terrace Underground parking

Park Court Akasaka The Tower (パークコート赤坂 ザ タワー, Park Court Akasaka The Tower) is a 157-meter high-rise building located in Akasaka, Tokyo.

The 43 floor 71,339-square-meter residential condominium tower was completed in 2009 and houses 521 units. It features a sky lounge on the 36–37th floors, a rooftop terrace, and underground parking.

The building is located in central Tokyo next to Aoyama-dori and the Akasaka Imperial Grounds with Akasaka Palace and Togu Palace, and within 10 minutes walk of Tokyo Metro stations Aoyama-itchōme, Akasaka, Akasaka-mitsuke, Nagatachō, Kokkai-gijidō-mae and Tameike-Sannō, with access to Ginza Line, Hanzōmon Line, Marunouchi Line, Yūrakuchō Line, Chiyoda Line, Namboku Line and the Toei Ōedo Line.

== See also ==
- List of tallest structures in Tokyo
