= Kokuritsu-Kyōgijō Station =

Tokyo subway station in Sendagaya, Shibuya

Kokuritsu-kyōgijō Station 国立競技場駅

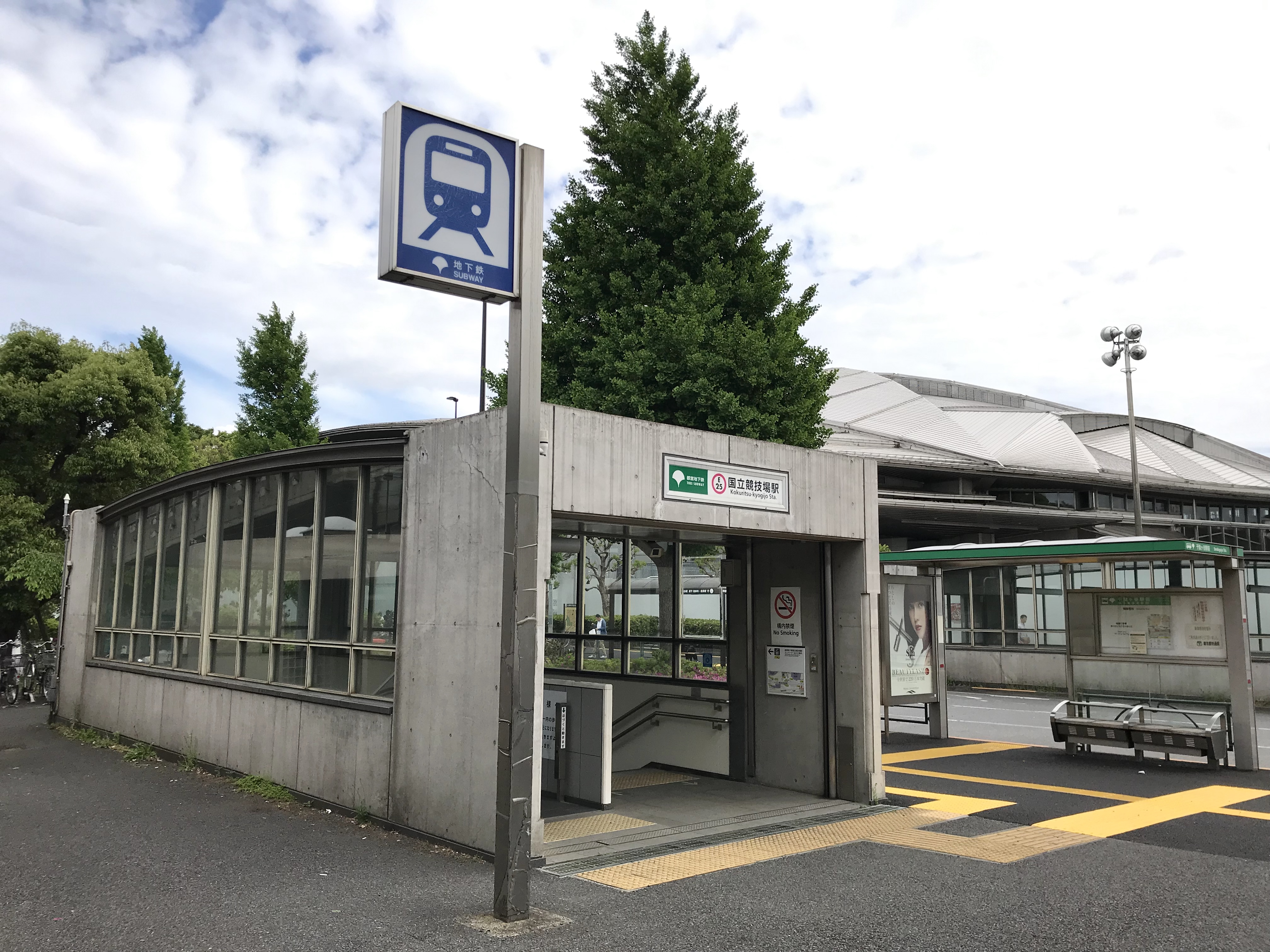
- Exit A5 of Kokuritsu-kyōgijō Station, May 2019. Note the Tokyo Metropolitan Gymnasium in the background.

Japanese name
- Shinjitai: 国立競技場駅
- Kyūjitai: 國立競技場驛
- Hiragana: こくりつきょうぎじょうえき

General information
- Location: 10-3 Kasumigaoka-cho, Shibuya City, Tokyo; Japan
- Coordinates: 35.68005°N 139.7141°E
- Operator: Toei Subway
- Line: Ōedo Line
- Platforms: 1 island platform
- Tracks: 2

Construction
- Structure type: Underground
- Accessible: Yes

Other information
- Station code: E-25

History
- Opened: 12 December 2000; 25 years ago

Services
Preceding station	Toei Subway	Following station
Yoyogi towards Hikarigaoka	Ōedo Line	Aoyama-itchōme towards Tochōmae
Location
- Location within Tokyo Yamanote Loop Location within Tokyo wards area Location within Japan

Kokuritsu-kyōgijō Station (国立競技場駅, Kokuritsu-kyōgijō-eki; lit. National Stadium Station), also known as Tōkyō Taiikukan-mae, is a Tokyo subway station located in Sendagaya, Shibuya and Shinanomachi, Shinjuku. Situated on the Toei Ōedo Line, the station is operated by the Tokyo Metropolitan Bureau of Transportation.

== Lines served ==
Toei Subway:

- Toei Ōedo Line

== Station layout ==
The station consists of an island platform serving two tracks.

=== Platforms ===
1	Ōedo Line	for Roppongi and Daimon
2	Ōedo Line	for Shinjuku, Tochomae and Hikarigaoka

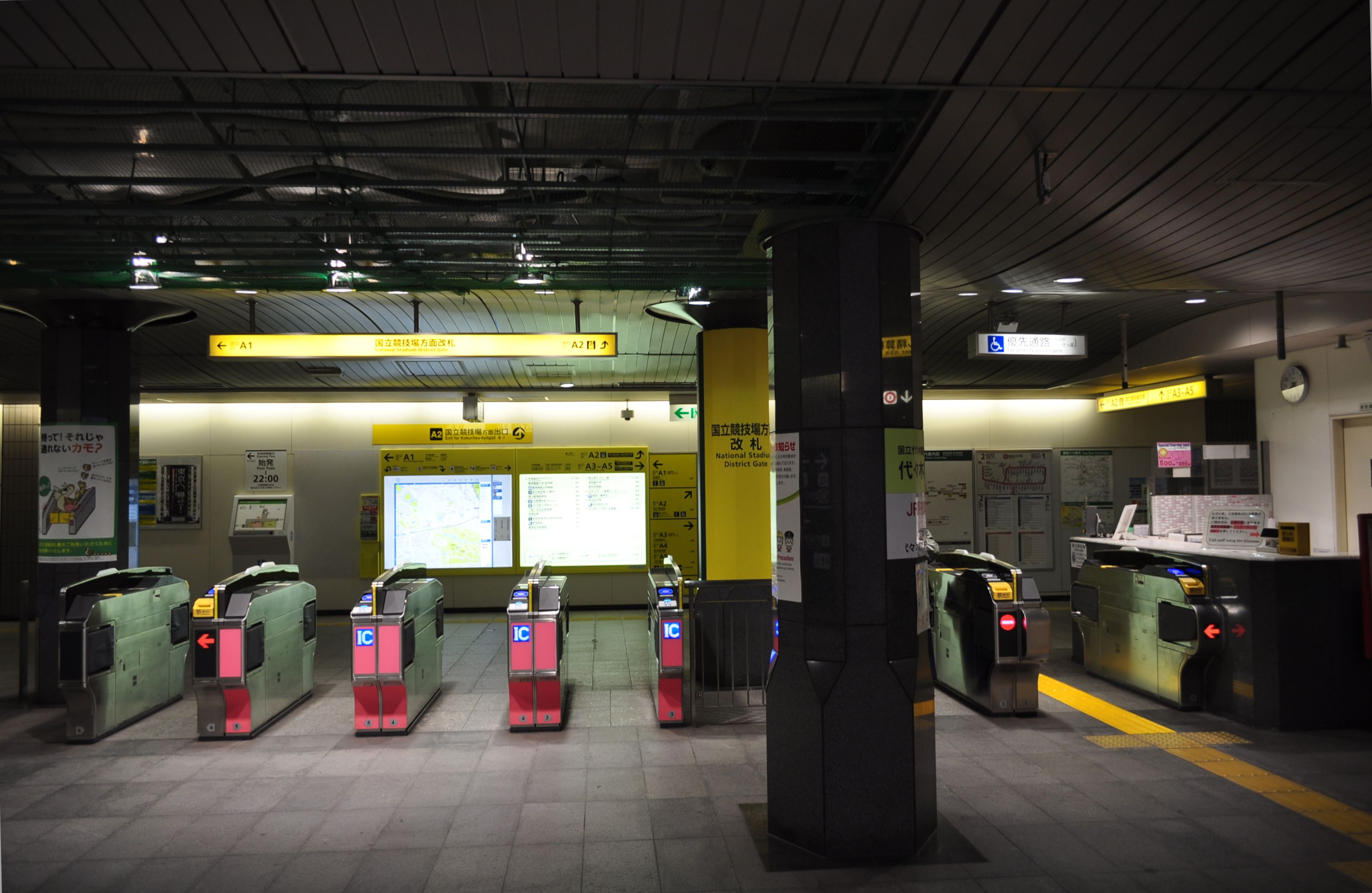
Ticket gates

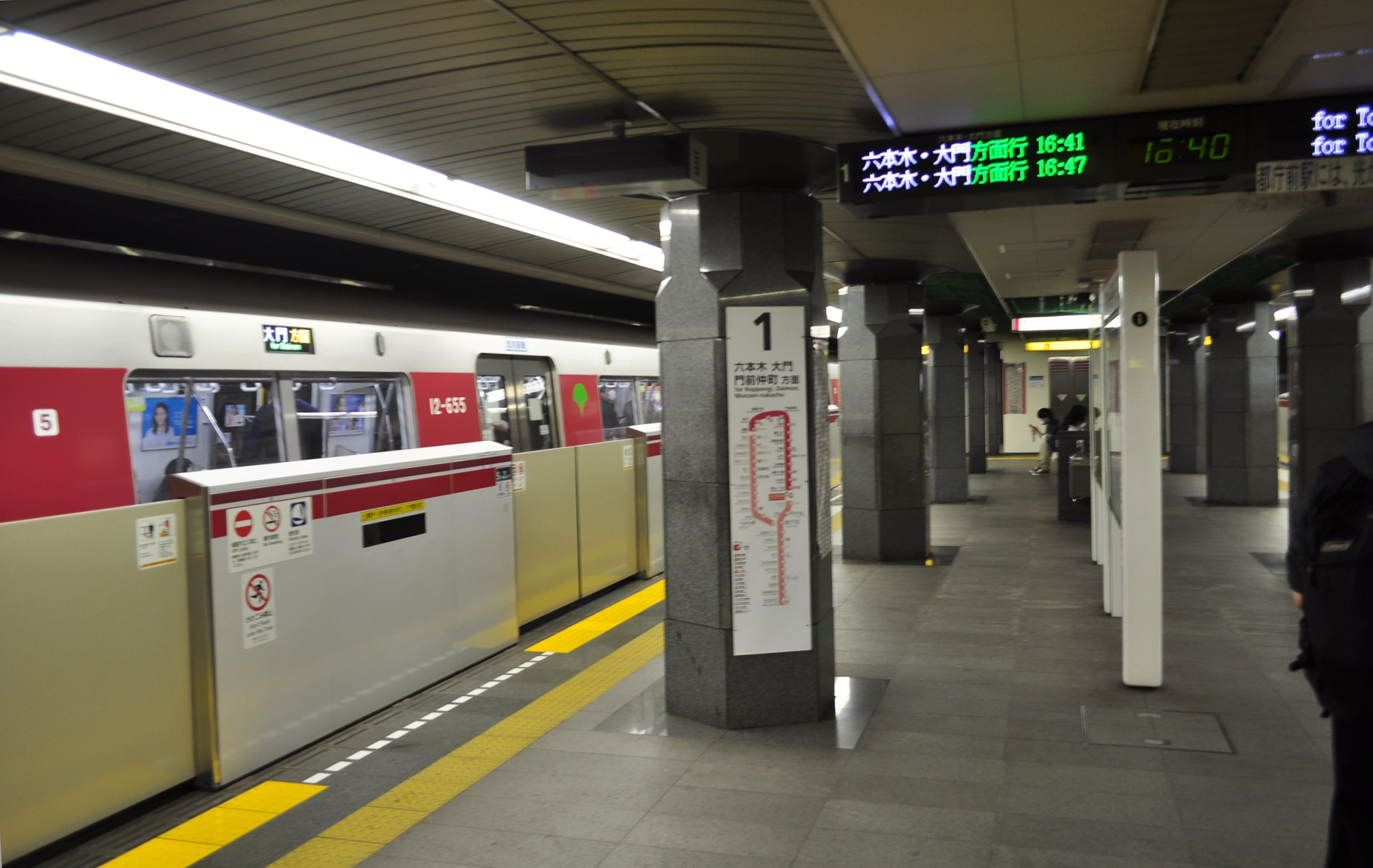
Platform 1, April 2018

== History ==
The subway line began full operations on December 12, 2000.

== Surrounding area ==
- Sendagaya Station (1-minute walk)
- Shinanomachi Station (7-minute walk)
- Shinjuku Gyo-en
- Japan National Stadium
- National Noh Theatre (国立能楽堂)
- Hato-no-Mori Hachiman Shrine (鳩森八幡神社)
- Meiji Jingu Skate, Curling Rink and Futsal Courts
- Meiji-Jingu Stadium used by the Japanese baseball team Yakult Swallows
- Chichibunomiya Rugby Stadium
- Tokyo Metropolitan Gymnasium, known as Tokyo Taiikukan in Japanese
- Keio University Medical School Hospital
