= Sendagaya Station =

Railway station in Tokyo, Japan

JB12 Sendagaya Station 千駄ケ谷駅
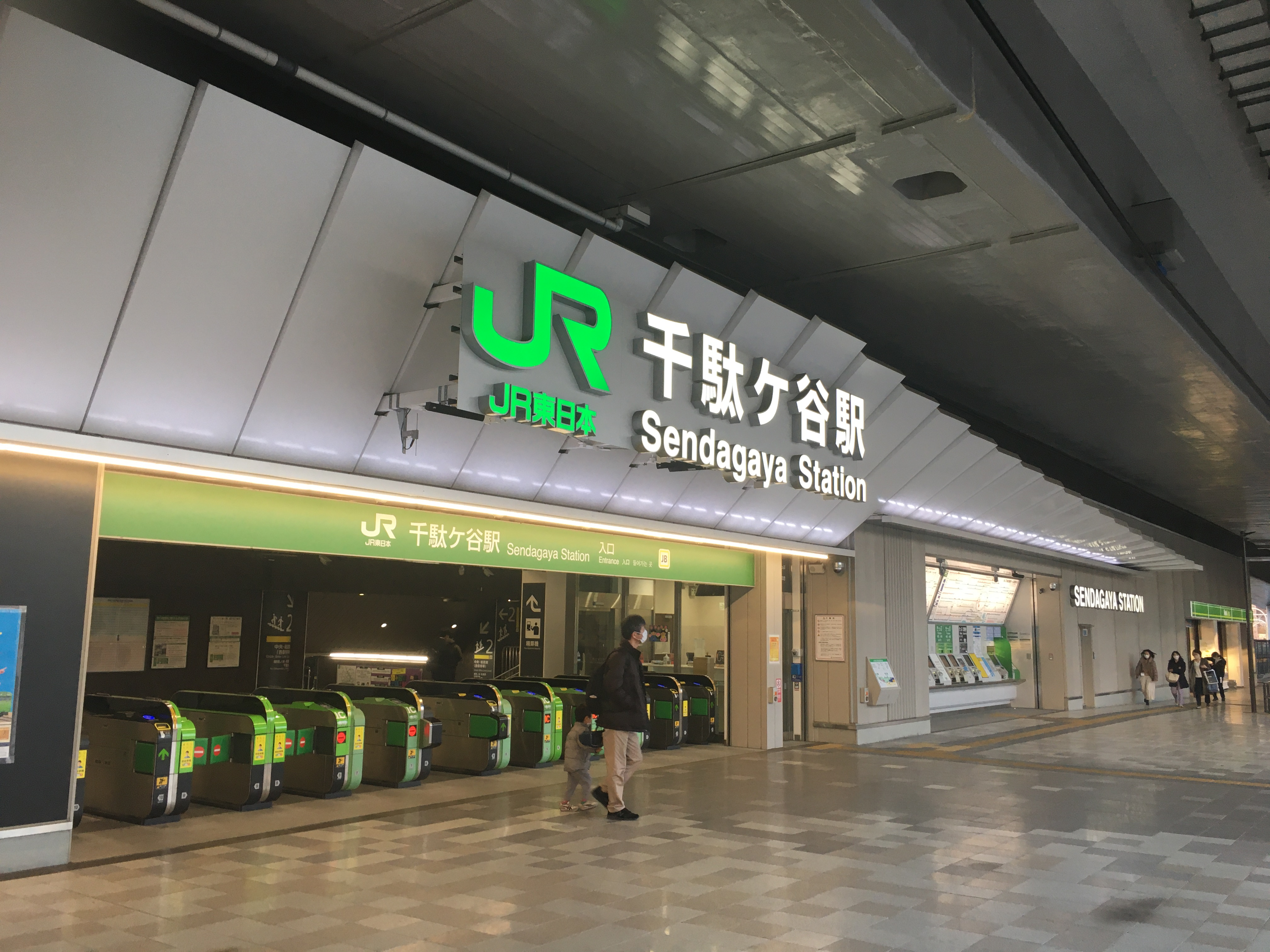
- Sendagaya Station entrance in March 2022

General information
- Location: 1 Sendagaya, Shibuya, Tokyo （東京都渋谷区千駄ヶ谷1丁目） Japan
- Coordinates: 35°40′52″N 139°42′41″E
- Operator: JR East
- Line: Chūō-Sōbu Line

History
- Opened: 1904

Passengers
- FY2011: 20,008 daily

Services
Preceding station	JR East	Following station
Yoyogi JB11 towards Mitaka	Chūō–Sōbu Line	Shinanomachi JB13 towards Chiba
Location
- Location within Tokyo Yamanote Loop Location within Tokyo wards area Location within Japan

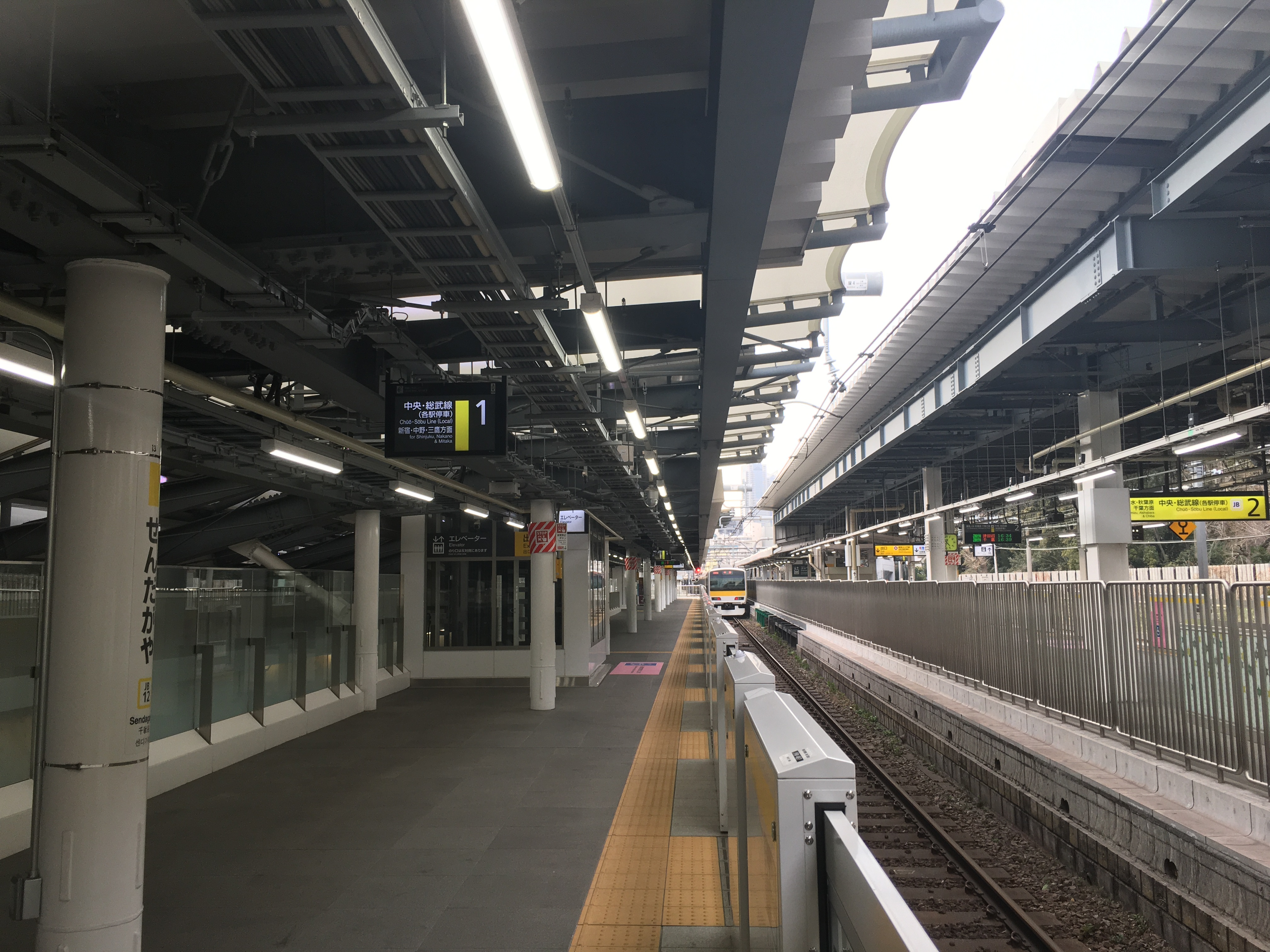
Platforms, 2022

Sendagaya Station (千駄ケ谷駅, Sendagaya-eki) is a railway station on the Chūō-Sōbu Line in Shibuya, Tokyo, Japan, operated by East Japan Railway Company (JR East).

== Lines ==
Sendagaya Station is served by Chūō-Sobu Line local services.

== Station layout ==
The station consists of an island platform serving eastbound trains and a side platform serving westbound trains.

=== Platforms ===
1	Chūō-Sōbu Line	Westbound for Shinjuku, Nakano, and Mitaka
2	Chūō-Sōbu Line	Eastbound for Ochanomizu, Akihabara, and Chiba

== History ==
The station opened on 21 August 1904.

In September 1964, a third temporary platform was constructed across from the existing island platform to separate passengers on westbound trains and eastbound trains to reduce overcrowding during the 1964 Summer Olympics. The third temporary platform has remained closed after the 1964 Games, but the plan was announced in 2016 to renovate the station and to convert the temporary platform to a permanent westbound platform in time for the 2020 Summer Olympics.

In March 2020, the renovation of the station and the conversion of the temporary platform was completed with the addition of new escalators, elevator and platform edge doors.

== Passenger statistics ==
In fiscal 2011, the station was used by an average of 20,008 passengers daily (boarding passengers only).

The passenger figures for previous years are as shown below.

Fiscal year	Daily average
2000	23,123
2005	22,213
2010	20,268
2011	20,008

== Surrounding area ==
Located in front of the station is Kokuritsu Kyogijo Station on the Toei Ōedo Line. Sendagaya is an important center for culture and sporting venues.

- Shinjuku Gyoen
- Olympic Stadium, Tokyo
- Tokyo Metropolitan Gymnasium
- National Noh Theatre
- Hato-no-Mori Hachiman Shrine
