= Toraya Confectionery =

Japanese confectionery company

Toraya Confectionery Co. Ltd.
- Native name: 株式会社虎屋
- Company type: Private
- Industry: Food
- Founded: early 16th century (late Muromachi Period); 1947 (Toraya Confectionery Co. Ltd.)
- Founder: Enchu Kurokawa
- Headquarters: Akasaka, Minato-ku, Tokyo 107-8401, Japan
- Area served: Worldwide
- Key people: Mitsuharu Kurokawa (President)
- Products: Traditional Japanese confections
- Website: Official website

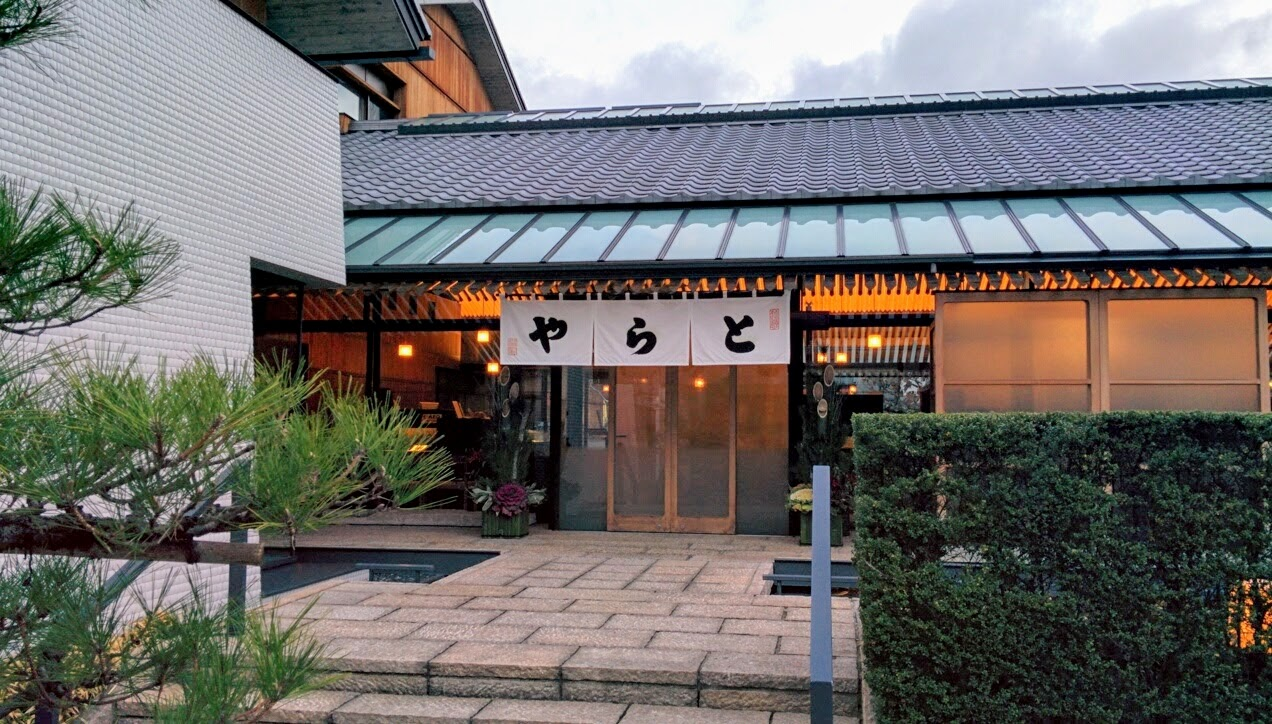
Kyoto store

Toraya Confectionery Co. Ltd. (株式会社虎屋, Kabushiki-gaisha Toraya) is a Japanese confectionery company. Its headquarters are in Akasaka, Minato, Tokyo.

What would become Toraya was founded in the 16th century in Kyoto by Kurokawa Enchū (黒川円仲). The company joined as a purveyor to the Imperial Court in Kyoto during the reign of Emperor Go-Yōzei.

Due to its longevity and being a family business since its founding, it is a member of the Henokiens association.

== See also ==
- List of oldest companies
