= Shinanomachi Station =

Railway station in Tokyo, Japan

JB13 Shinanomachi Station 信濃町駅
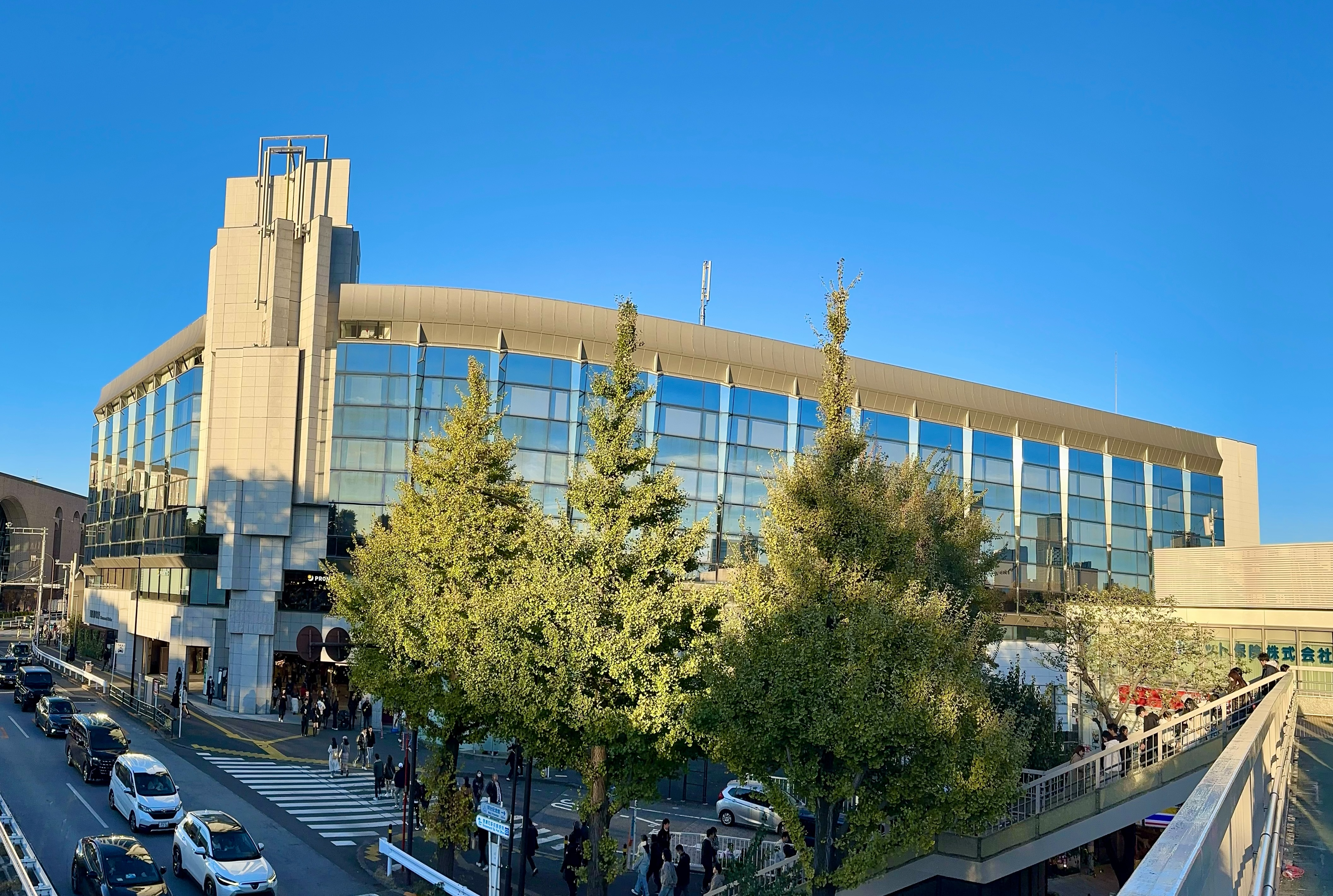
- Shinanomachi Station building in November 2024

General information
- Location: Shinanomachi, Shinjuku-ku, Tokyo; Japan
- Coordinates: 35°40′48″N 139°43′13″E
- Operator: JR East
- Line: Chūō-Sōbu Line
- Platforms: 1 island platform
- Tracks: 4

Other information
- Station code: JB13
- Website: Official website

History
- Opened: 9 October 1894

Passengers
- FY2015: 25,596 daily

Services
Preceding station	JR East	Following station
Sendagaya JB12 towards Mitaka	Chūō–Sōbu Line	Yotsuya JB14 towards Chiba
Location
- Location within Tokyo Yamanote Loop Location within Tokyo wards area Location within Japan

Shinanomachi Station (信濃町駅, Shinanomachi-eki) is a railway station on the Chūō-Sōbu Line in Shinjuku, Tokyo, Japan, operated by the East Japan Railway Company (JR East).

The Number of Passengers on Shinanomachi as recorded by the East Japan Railway Company Trains in 2017-2022 was 6,050 (（単位 千人）).

== Lines ==
The station is served by the Chūō-Sōbu Line.

== Station layout ==
The station consists of a single island platform serving two tracks.

=== Platforms ===
1	Chūō-Sobu Line	for Shinjuku, Nakano, and Mitaka
2	Chūō-Sobu Line	for Ochanomizu, Akihabara, and Chiba

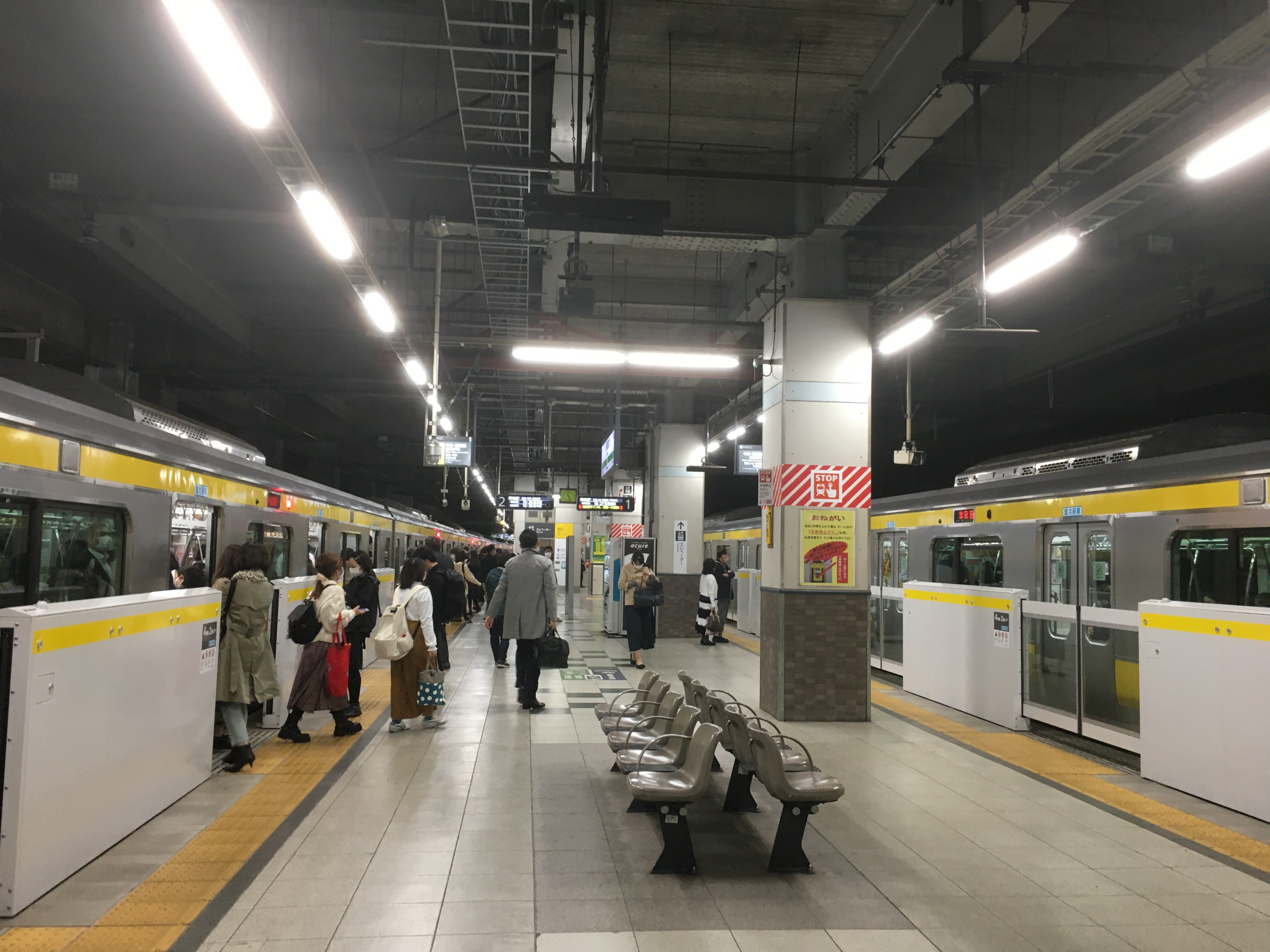
The platform in October 2021

== History ==
The station opened on 9 October 1894. With the privatization of Japanese National Railways (JNR) on 1 April 1987, the station came under the control of JR East.

== Surrounding area ==
- Keio University Medical School Hospital
- Meiji-Jingu Stadium
- Soka Gakkai Headquarters
  - Hall of the Great Vow for Kosen-rufu (Kosen-rufu Daiseido)
- Soka Culture Center
- Soka Gakkai Josei Toda International Centre (Soka Gakkai International Headquarters)
- Soka Young Women's Centre
- Komeito Headquarters
- Seikyo Shimbun Headquarters
- Min-On Music Museum

== See also ==
- List of railway stations in Japan
