= Kasumigaoka, Shinjuku =

Kasumigaoka 霞ヶ丘町
- District
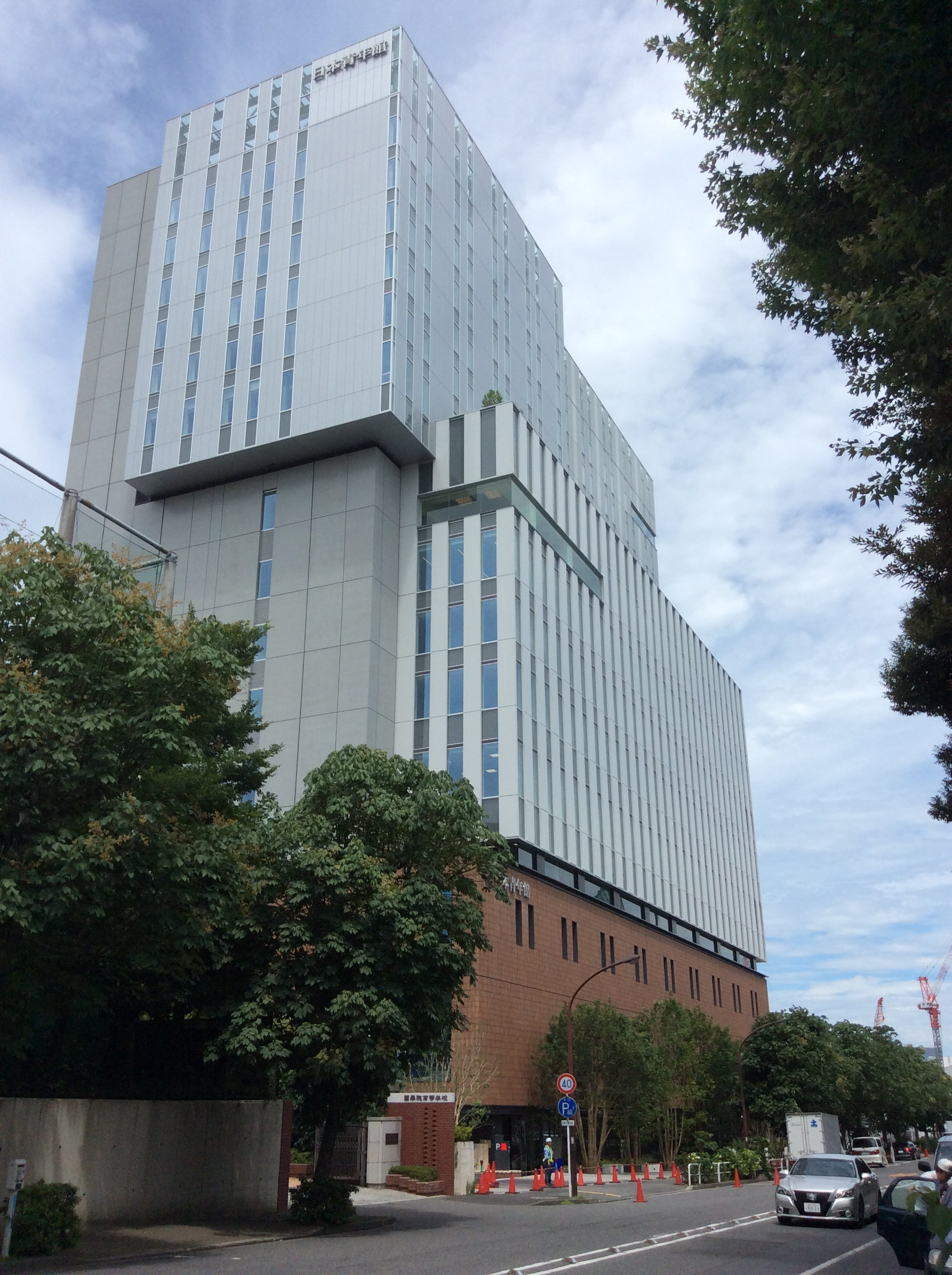
- Nippon Seinenkan

- Location of Kasumigaoka within Tokyo
- Coordinates: 35°40′48.6″N 139°42′52.66″E
- Country: Japan
- Region: Kantō
- Prefecture: Tokyo
- Ward: Shinjuku

Population (December 1, 2019)
  - Total: 2
- Time zone: UTC+9 (JST)
- Zip code: 160-0013
- Area code: 03

Kasumigaoka district (霞ヶ丘町, Kasumigaoka-machi) is a district of Shinjuku, Tokyo, Japan. The district is an undivided block, so addresses do not use chō (丁目).

== Geography ==
Located in the southernmost part of Shinjuku, Meiji Shrine Outer Garden (Meiji Jingu Gaien) occupies most of the town area. The northern part of the town borders Daikyōchō and Shinanomachi in Shinjuku across the JR Chūō Line, and the northeastern part borders Minamimotomachi in Shinjuku. To the east and south of the town area, there is a ward boundary with Minato in Jingu Gaien, which borders Kita-Aoyama in Minato. The western part of the town area borders Jingūmae and Sendagaya in Shibuya.

Meiji Jingu Gaien and Metropolitan Meiji Park occupy the main part of the town area, and the Japan National Stadium, Meiji Jingu Stadium, Meiji Memorial Picture Gallery, etc. in Meiji Jingu Gaien belong to this town area. However, of the Meiji Jingu Gaien, the southern Chichibunomiya Rugby Stadium and the vicinity of Ginkgo trees belong to Kita-Aoyama, Minato-ku.

In the southwestern part of the town area, there used to be a Toei Kasumigaoka apartment (Kasumigaoka housing complex), and the resident population of this town used to be almost all residents of the apartment. It was built in 1946 as a 100-unit metropolitan housing in the form of a Nagaya, and was rebuilt in the 1960s at the time of the 1964 Summer Olympics (10 buildings, 300 units). Most of them were residents of Kasumigaoka before the Olympics, and they were evacuated to move into this apartment when the event was held.

The Toei Kasumigaoka Apartment was demolished due to the expansion of the site for the construction of the National Stadium due to the 2020 Tokyo Olympics, and the Kasumigaoka Town Council was dissolved on January 31, 2016. Originally the land where the barracks were located, the stables were also damaged by the war and only Hayagriva remains.

In addition, a part of the site has been dismantled from the Gaien House in Kasumigaoka and rebuilt into the luxury condominium "THE COURT Jingu Gaien".

== Education ==
The Shinjuku City Board of Education operates public elementary and junior high schools. Kasumigaoka is zoned to Yotsuya No. 6 (Dairoku) Elementary School (四谷第六小学校) and Yotsuya Junior High School (四谷中学校).
