= Yotsuya =

Area in Shinjuku, Tokyo, Japan

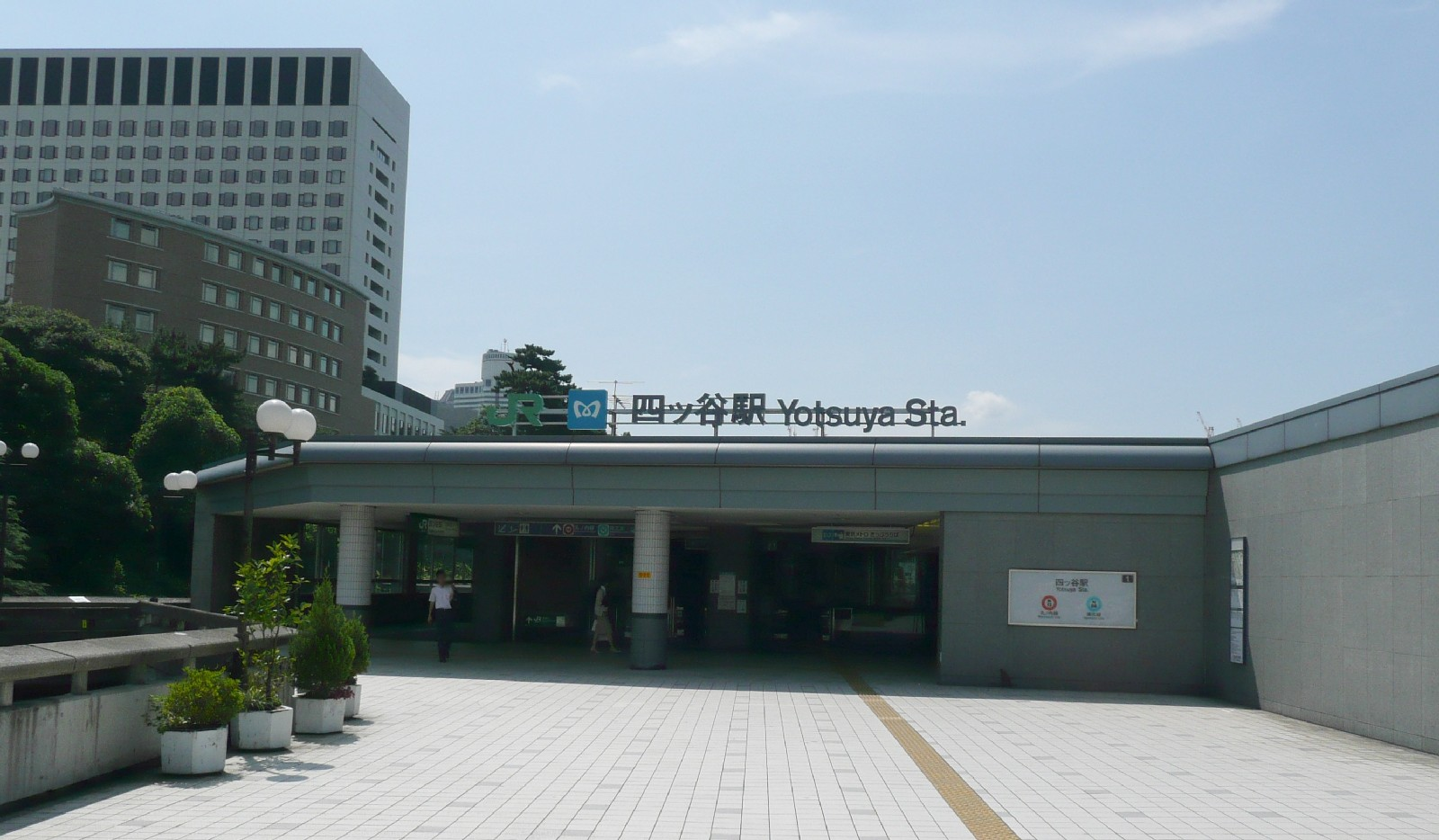
Yotsuya Station

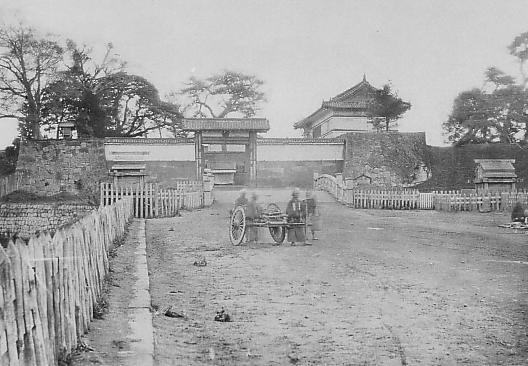
The former Yotsuya Gate (四谷門)

Yotsuya (四谷, 四ツ谷) is an area in Shinjuku, Tokyo, that previously was a ward (四谷区 Yotsuya-ku) in the now-defunct Tokyo City. In 1947, when the 35 wards of Tokyo were reorganized into 23, it was merged with Ushigome ward of Tokyo City and Yodobashi suburban ward of Tokyo-fu to form the modern Shinjuku ward.

== Geography ==
Yotsuya is located in the southeastern part of Shinjuku. Prior to 1943, when Tokyo was still a city, Yotsuya was one of its wards and had definite boundaries, but it is less clearly defined today. Yotsuya is generally defined as coinciding with the jurisdiction of the Shinjuku City Yotsuya Branch Office and the Yotsuya Police Station, which includes most of Shinjuku east of Meiji-dōri and south of Yasukuni-dōri. To the east lies the neighborhoods of Banchō in Chiyoda.

For addressing purposes, the name Yotsuya is used for a part of Shinjuku located immediately west of Yotsuya Station; it is divided into four chōme.

== History ==
Before the growth of Edo, Yotsuya was a farming village outside the city. In 1634, with the digging of the outer moat around Edo Castle, many temples and shrines moved to Yotsuya. The moat had stone walls, and a mitsuke, or watch tower, was also built. Yotsuya Mitsuke stood near the present-day Yotsuya Station.

The relocation of the temples and construction of the mitsuke brought settlements of workers, and following the devastating Meireki fire, many more people moved to Yotsuya, which had been spared. Gradually the area became part of the city of Edo.

In 1695, the shōgun Tokugawa Tsunayoshi ordered the establishment of a vast kennel. The purpose was to board stray dogs as part of his policy of showing mercy to animals. The facility outside the Yotsuya Gate occupied 20,000 tsubo (66,000 m^{2}; 710,000 ft^{2}).

Yotsuya developed rapidly due to its central location. In 1894, the Kōbu Railway, predecessor of the present-day Chūō Line, extended its existing railway line between Shinjuku and Tachikawa to Ushigome and opened Yotsuya and Shinanomachi stations. The railway enabled the easy transport of raw materials into the area; soon, pencil, tobacco and other industries moved in and began Yotsuya's rapid industrial development.

== Culture ==
Many historic temples and graves are located in Yotsuya. Among them are Sainen-ji, where the grave of the ninja Hattori Hanzō and his lance are interred.

The Korea Center is located in Yotsuya, and the Korea Education Institution (Korean: 동경한국교육원, Japanese: 東京韓国教育院), affiliated with the Embassy of South Korea, is inside.

== Education ==
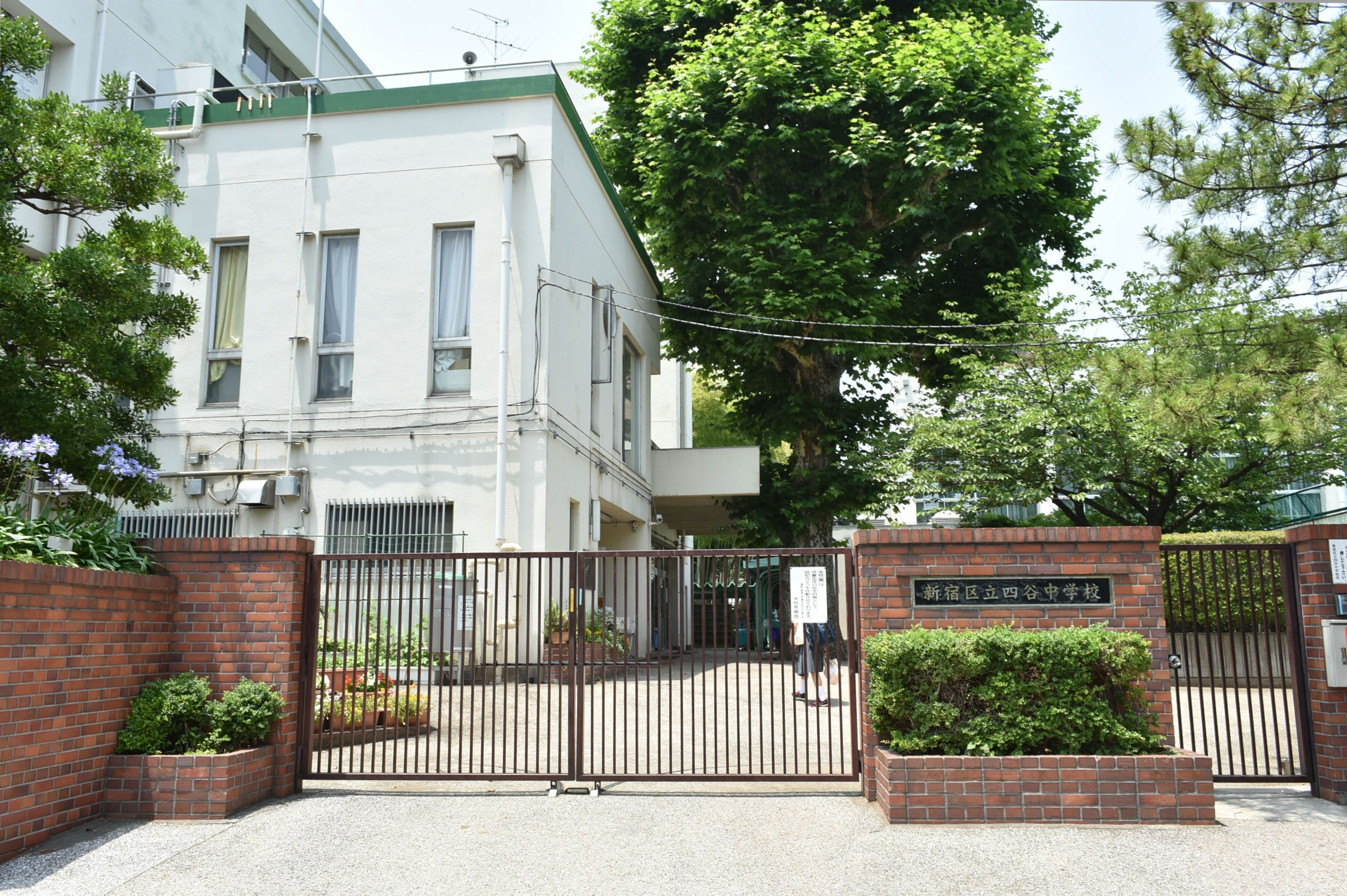
Yotsuya Junior High School (四谷中学校)

The Shinjuku City (the Shinjuku Ward) Board of Education (新宿区教育委員会) operates public elementary and junior high schools.

Most portions of Yotsuya are zoned to Yotsuya Elementary School (四谷小学校), which is in Yotsuya 2-chōme. Sections zoned to Yotsuya ES include all of 1 and 2-chōme and portions of 3 and 4-chōme. The remainder of Yotsuya 3 and 4-chōme are zoned to Yotsuya 6th (Dairoku) Elementary School (四谷第六小学校) in Daikyōchō. All sections of Yotsuya, 1 to 4-chōme included, are zoned to Yotsuya Junior High School (四谷中学校) in Yotsuya 1-chōme.

Most area public high schools are operated by the Tokyo Metropolitan Government Board of Education.

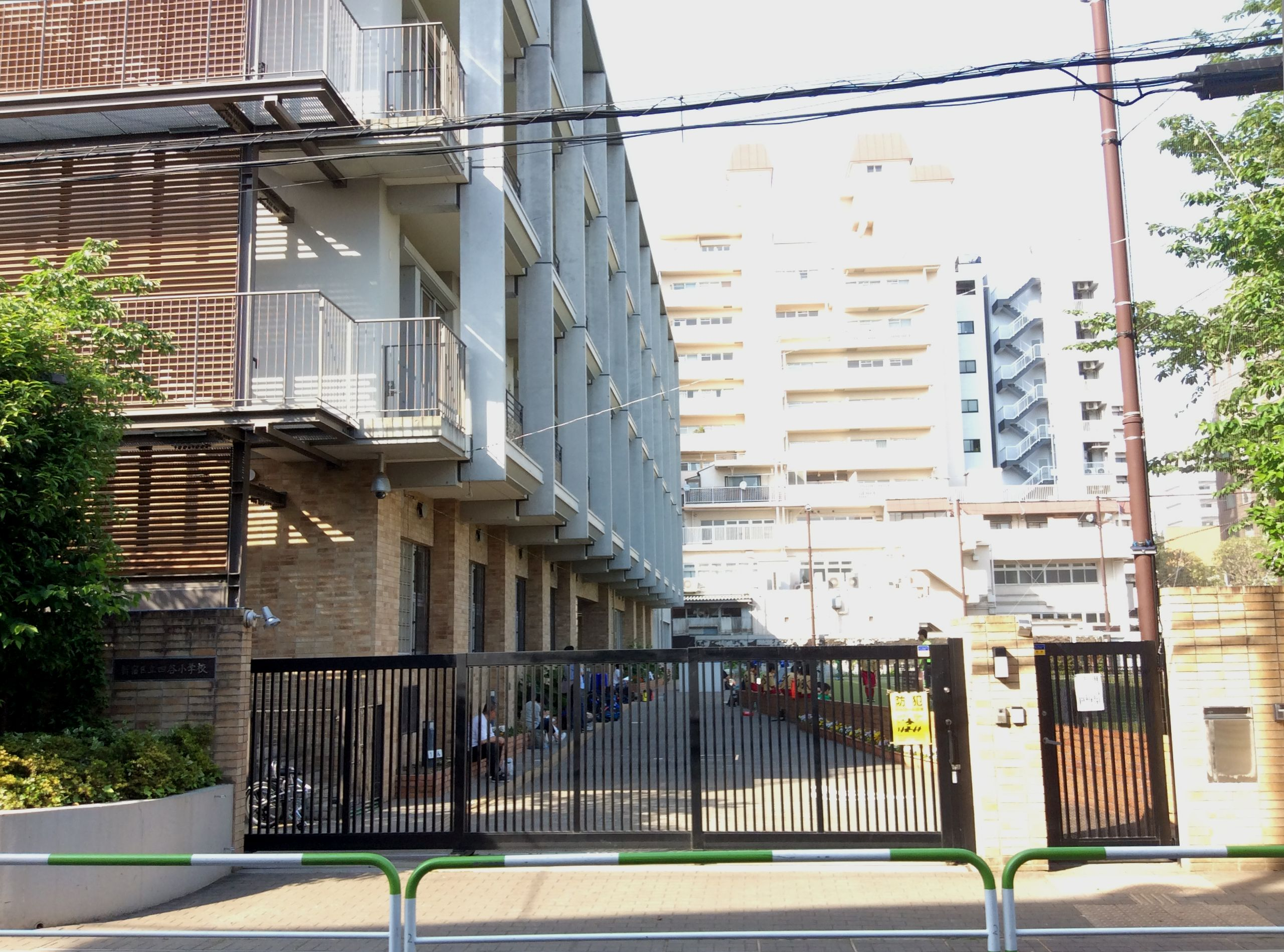
Yotsuya Elementary School (四谷小学校)

== Notable people ==
Prime Minister Saito Makoto lived in Yotsuya. He was assassinated at his home on February 26, 1936. This was one of the events of the February 26 Incident.

Other notable residents include:

- Futabatei Shimei, author
- San'yūtei Enchō, writer and rakugoka

== In fiction ==
Yotsuya has figured prominently in various works of fiction. The kabuki play Yotsuya Kaidan took place there, as did the novel Teisō Mondō by Kan Kikuchi. Yotsuya was the setting for the Shōtarō Ikenami historical novel Kenkaku Shōbai and the jidaigeki television series based on it. It was also featured in the novel Norwegian Wood by Haruki Murakami.
