= Meiji Shrine Outer Garden =

Garden in Tokyo, Japan

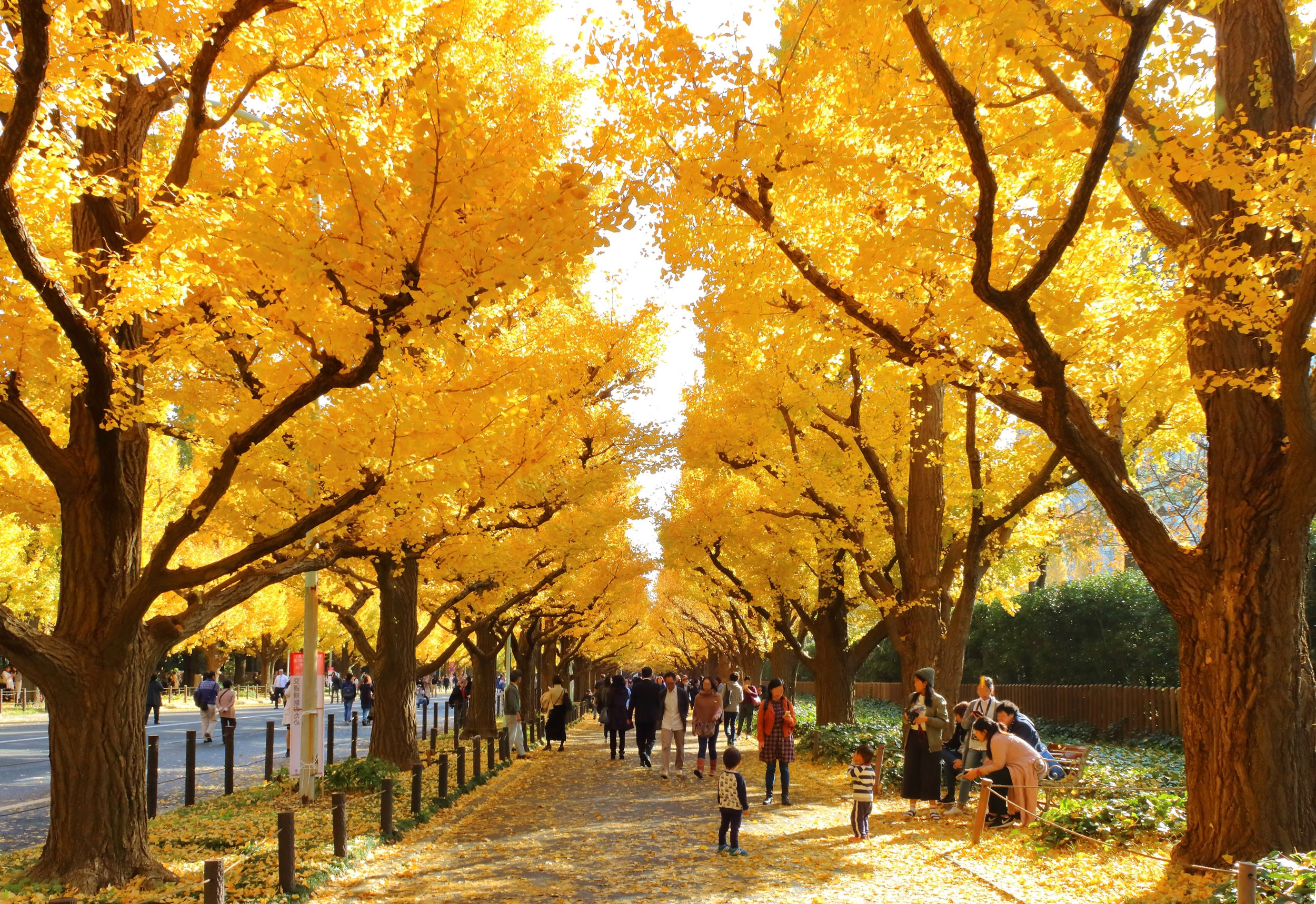
- Ginkgo trees in the park in autumn
- Interactive map of Meiji Shrine Outer Garden
- Location: Shinjuku and Minato, Tokyo, Japan
- Coordinates: 35°40′39″N 139°43′6″E
- Area: 580,000 square metres (140 acres)
- Created: 1926
- Public transit: Gaiemmae Station

Meiji Shrine Outer Garden (明治神宮外苑, Meiji-jingū Gaien) is a Western-style garden in the Kasumigaokamachi neighborhood of Shinjuku Ward and the Aoyama neighborhood of Minato Ward in Tokyo.

== History ==
It was created by private volunteers to convey the virtues of Emperor Meiji (3 November 1852 – 30 July 1912), and his wife Empress Shōken. It was consecrated in 1926 as the outer garden of Meiji Shrine.

== Overview ==
The inner garden is Japanese in style, while the outer garden is Western. Meiji Memorial Picture Gallery and Meiji Jingu Stadium are located in the vast site.

== Facilities ==
- Meiji Memorial Picture Gallery
- Meiji Memorial Hall
- Meiji Jingu Stadium
- Meiji Jingu Gaien Japanese-style baseball Ground
- Meiji Jingu Gaien Nikoniko Park — Children's amusement park
- Meiji Jingu Gaien Ice Skating Rink — Indoor ice skating rink available all year round
- Jingu Gaien Futsal Club — Futsal area
- Meiji Jingu Gaien Tennis Club
- Meiji Jingu Gaien Golf Range
- Meiji Jingu Batting Dome
- Ginkgo trees – A row of ginkgo trees lining Japan National Route 246

== Access ==
- By train: 5 minutes’ walk from Gaiemmae Station on the Tokyo Metro Ginza Line.

== Gallery ==
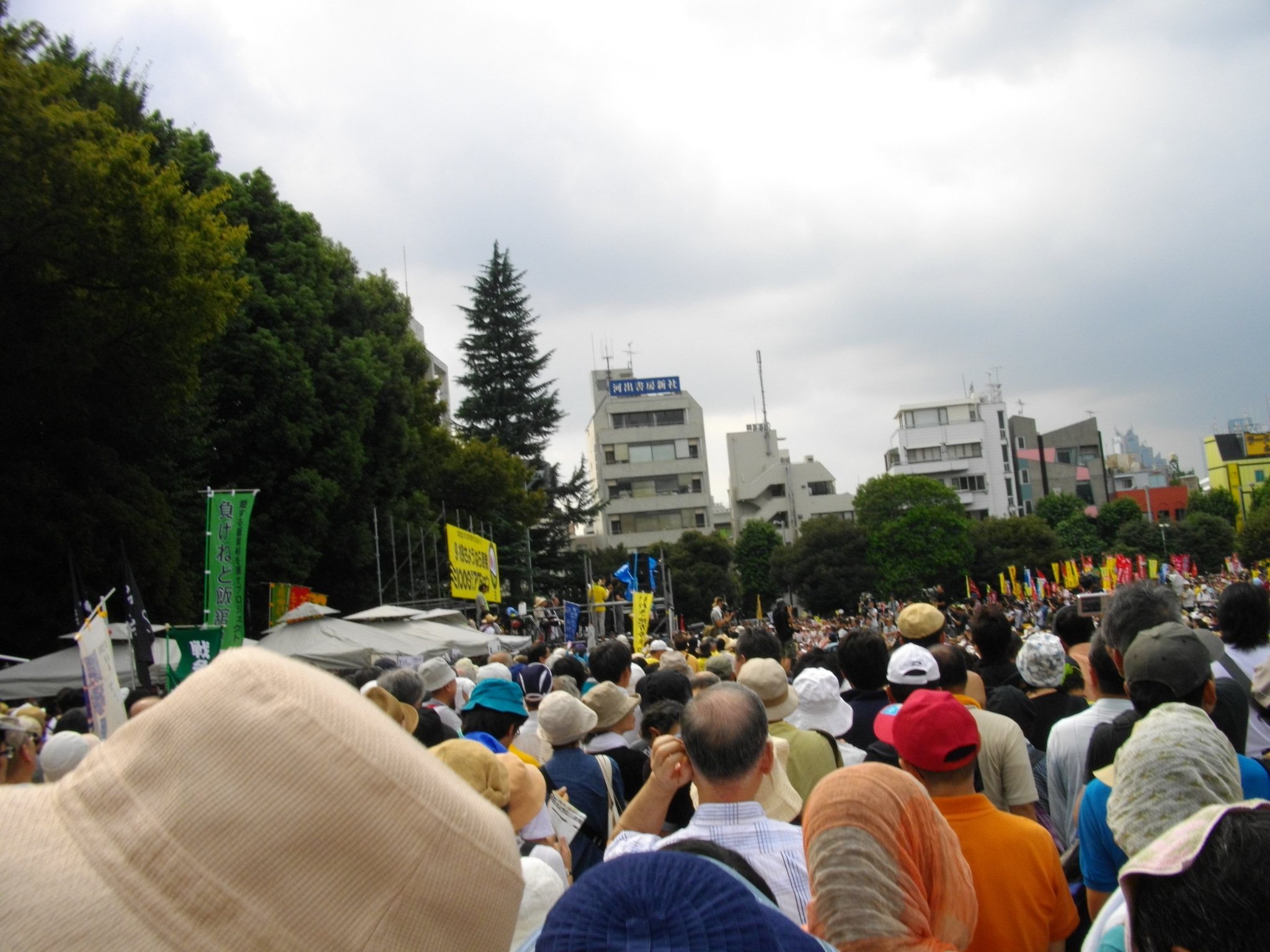
Rally in the outer garden in 2011

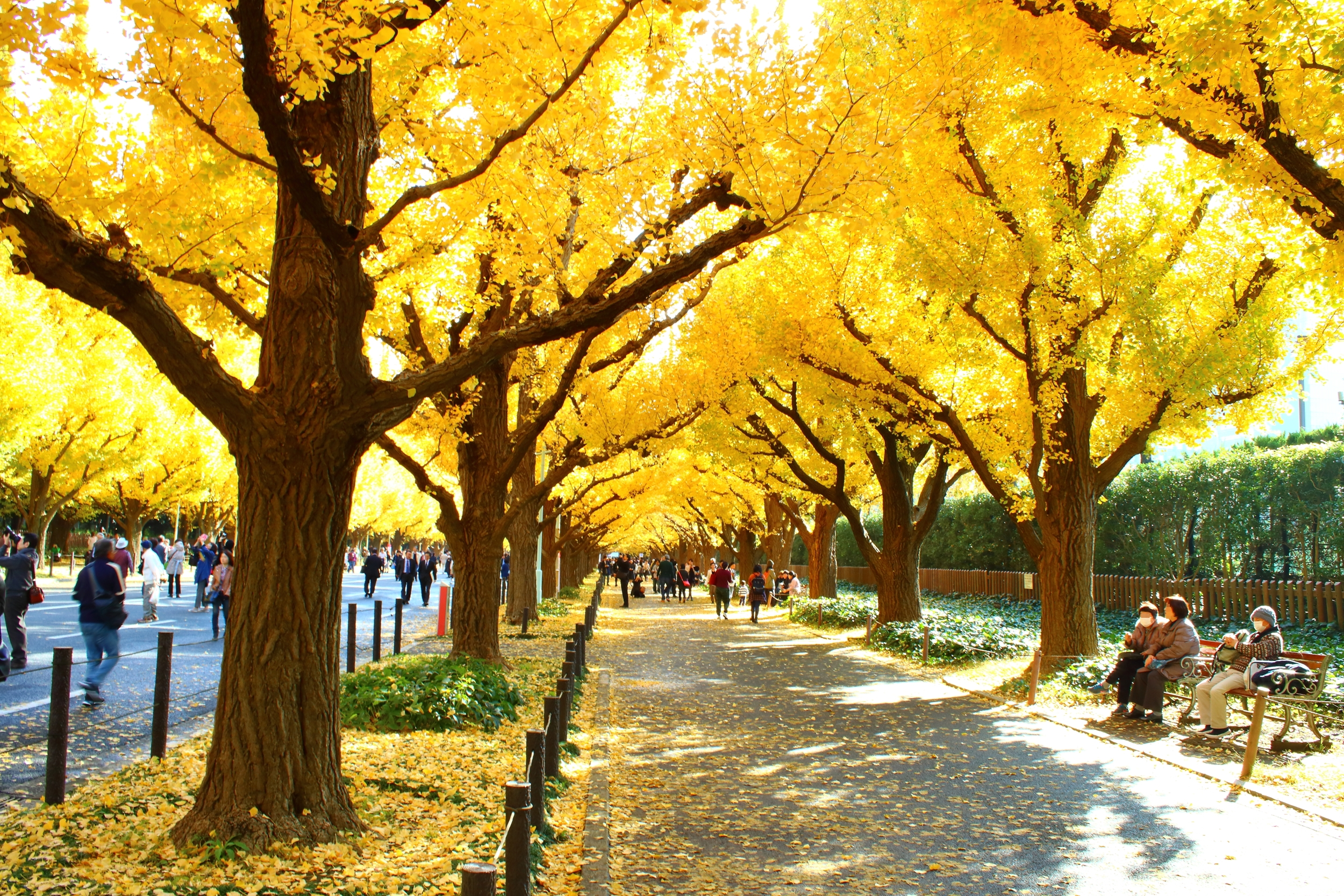
Autumn trees

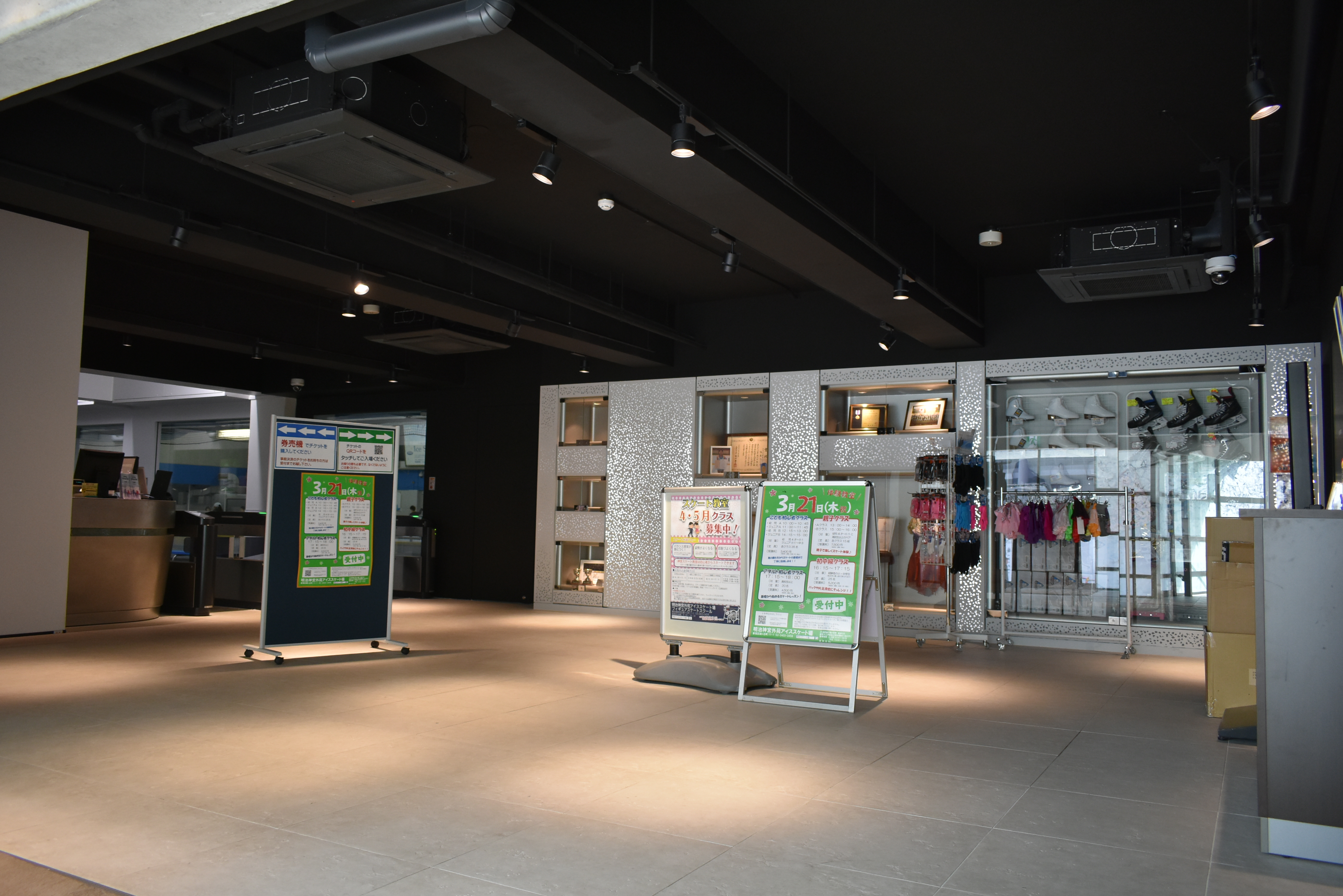
Mitsui Garden Hotel Jingu-Gaien Tokyo Premier

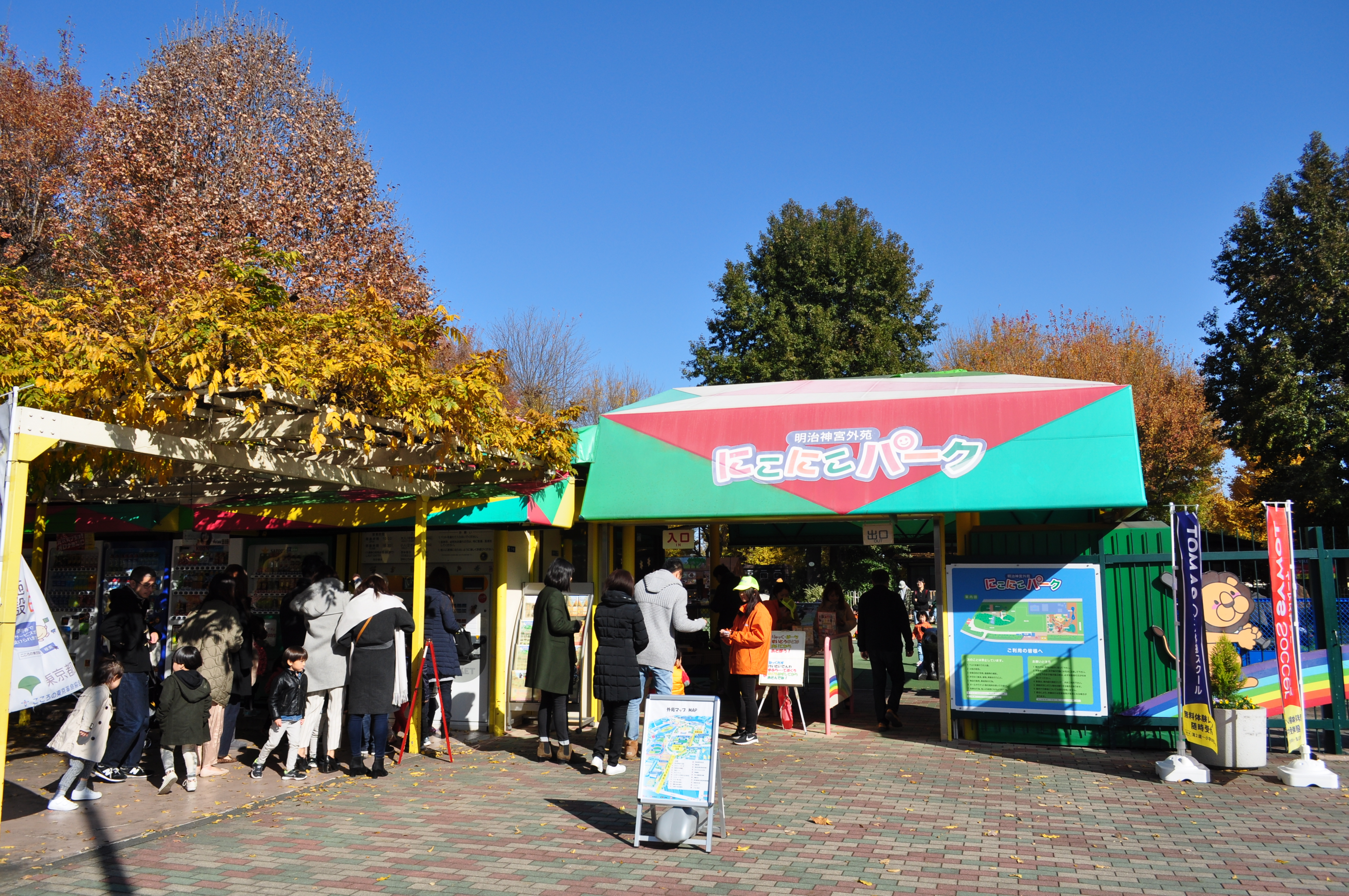
Nikoniko Park

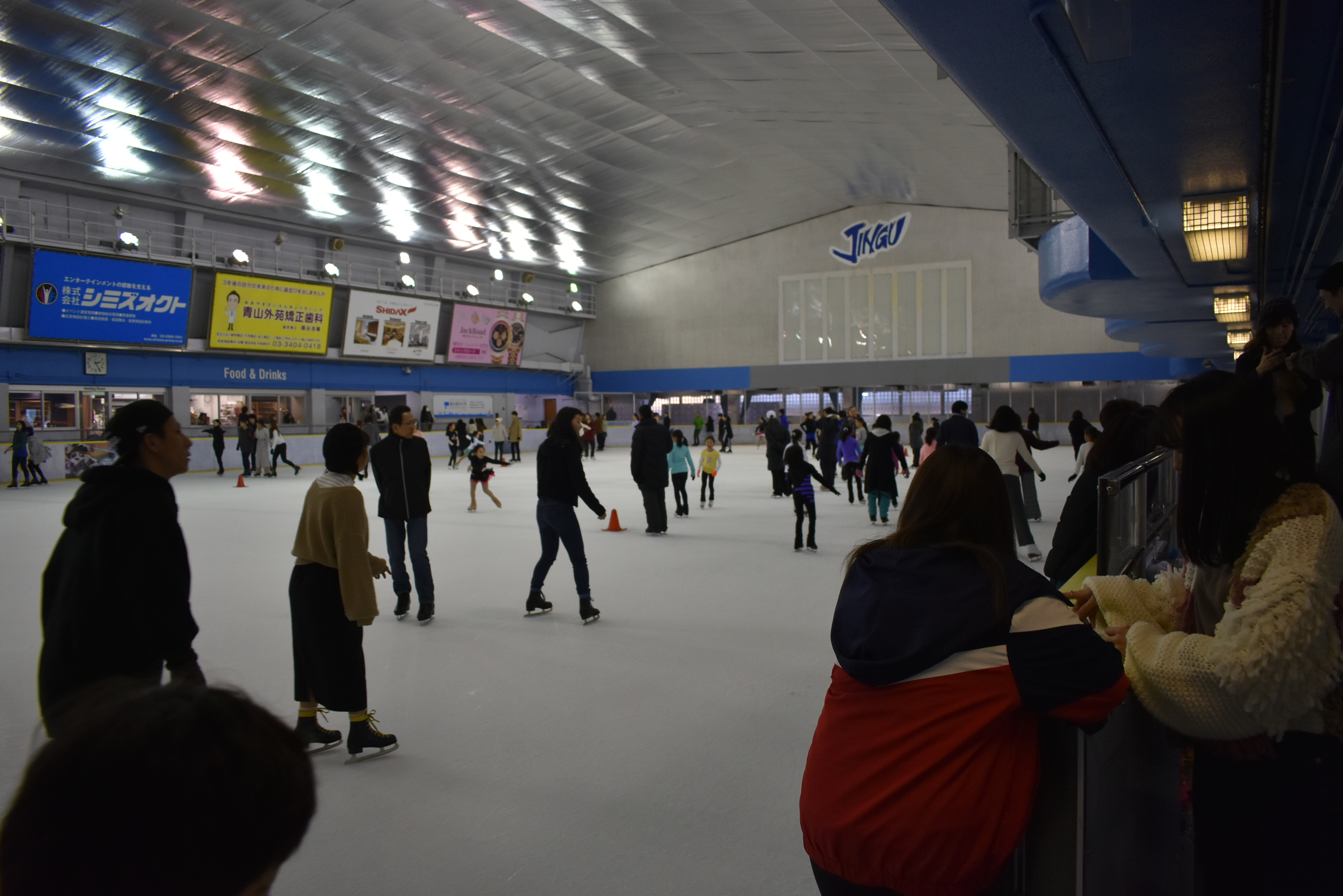
Ice rink

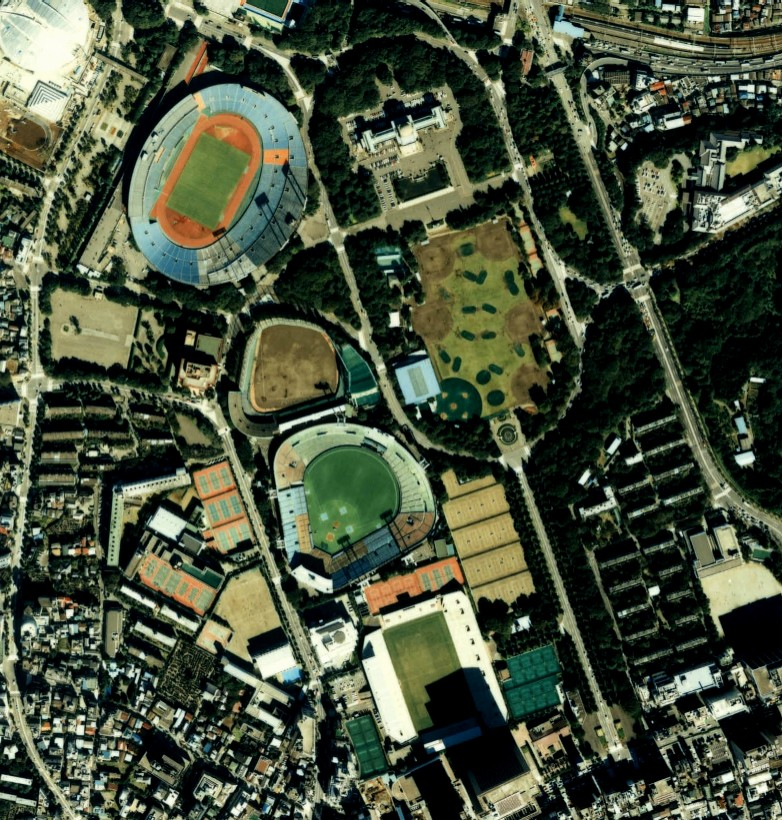
Aerial photograph of Meiji Jingu Gaien in 1989

== See also ==
- Parks and gardens in Tokyo
- National Parks of Japan
