= Yotsuya Station =

Railway and metro station in Tokyo, Japan

Coordinates: 35°41′10″N 139°43′50″E

JC04 JB14 Yotsuya Station 四ツ谷駅

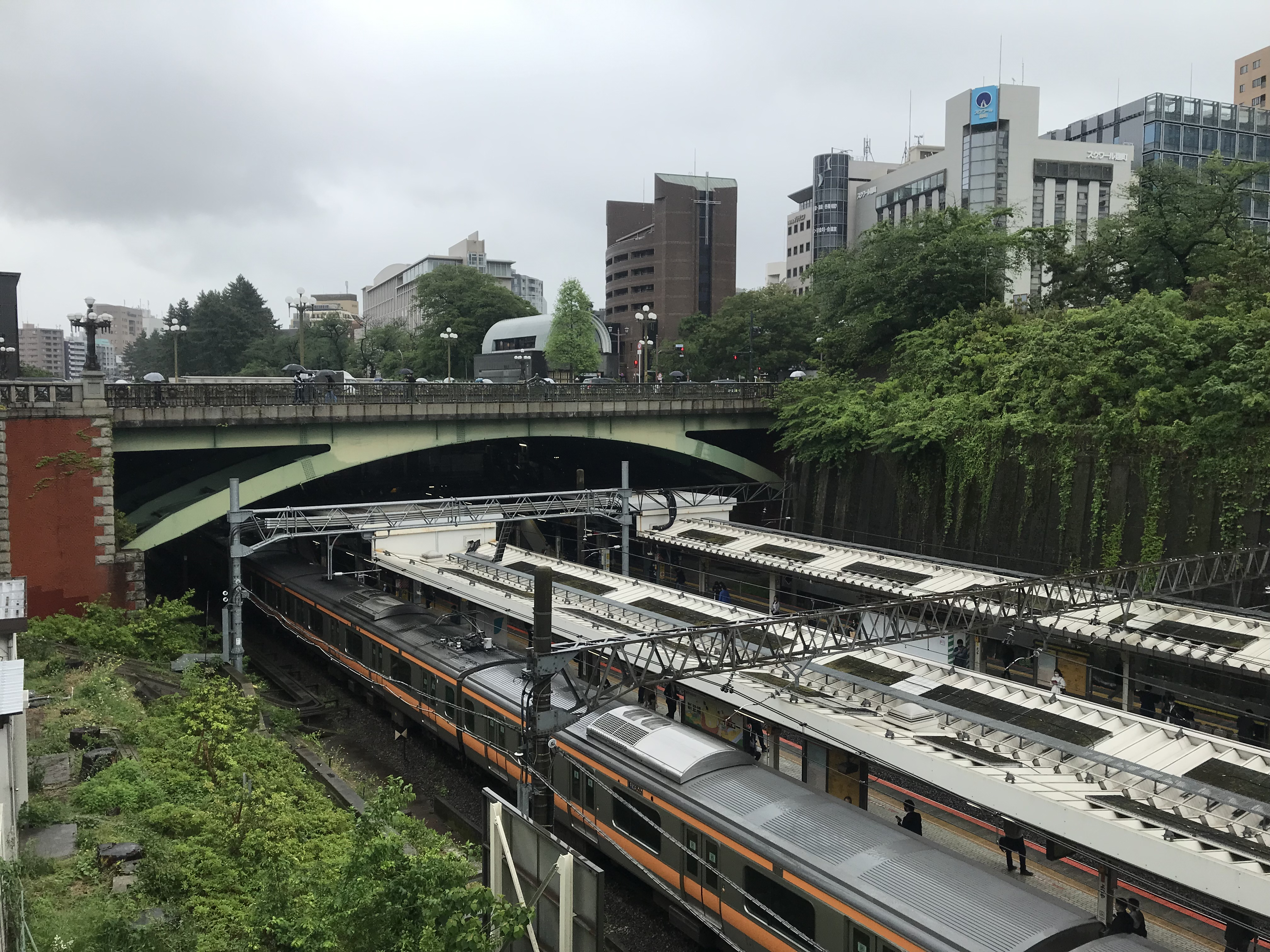
- JR platforms from above, with the Kojimachi entrance above the bridge and behind a tree, April 2023

General information
- Location: 1 Yotsuya, Shinjuku, Tokyo; Japan
- Operator: JR East; Tokyo Metro
- Lines: Chūō Line (Rapid); Chūō-Sōbu Line; Marunouchi Line; Namboku Line

Other information
- Station code: JC04 (Chūō Line (Rapid)); JB14 (Chūō-Sōbu Line); M-12 (Marunouchi Line); N-08 (Namboku Line)

History
- Opened: 9 September 1894; 132 years ago

Passengers
- FY2024: 177,874 daily; 117,584 daily

Services
| Preceding station | JR East | Following station |
|---|---|---|
| Shinjuku One-way operation | Chūō Line Commuter Special Rapid | Ochanomizu JC03 towards Tokyo |
| Shinjuku towards Ōtsuki | Chūō Line Chūō Special Rapid | Ochanomizu JC03 towards Tokyo |
| Shinjuku towards Tachikawa | Chūō Line Ōme Special Rapid | Ochanomizu JC03 towards Tokyo |
| Shinjuku towards Ōtsuki | Chūō Line Commuter Rapid | Ochanomizu One-way operation |
| Shinjuku towards Ōtsuki | Chūō Line Rapid | Ochanomizu JC03 towards Tokyo |
| Shinanomachi JB13 towards Mitaka | Chūō–Sōbu Line | Ichigaya JB15 towards Chiba |
| Preceding station | Tokyo Metro | Following station |
| Yotsuya-sanchome towards Ogikubo or Hōnanchō | Marunouchi Line | Akasaka-mitsuke towards Ikebukuro |
| Nagatacho towards Meguro | Namboku Line | Ichigaya towards Akabane-iwabuchi |
Location
- Location within Tokyo Yamanote Loop Location within Tokyo wards area Location within Japan

Yotsuya Station (四ツ谷駅, Yotsuya-eki) is a railway station in the Yotsuya district of Shinjuku, Tokyo, Japan, operated jointly by East Japan Railway Company (JR East) and Tokyo Metro. Several parts of the station are also located in the Rokubancho and Kojimachi neighborhoods of Chiyoda ward.

== Lines ==
Yotsuya Station is served by the JR East Chūō Main Line with both Chūō Line (Rapid) and Chūō-Sōbu Line local services stopping here.

It is also served by the Tokyo Metro Marunouchi Line (station number M-12) and Tokyo Metro Namboku Line (station number N-08) subway lines. The station is 13.7 km (8.5 mi) from the Marunouchi Line terminus at Ikebukuro, and 7.8 km (4.8 mi) from the Namboku Line terminus at Meguro.

All four lines at Yotsuya run north to south; however, the Chūō/Chūō-Sōbu Line and Marunouchi Line are mainly east–west lines, and somewhat counter-intuitively, while northbound Chūō Line trains are bound for Tokyo and southbound trains are bound for Shinjuku, northbound Marunouchi Line trains are bound for Shinjuku and southbound trains are bound for Tokyo.

== Station layout ==
=== JR East ===
The JR East part of the station consists of two island platforms serving four tracks. The station has a "Midori no Madoguchi" staffed ticket counter and "View Plaza" travel agency.

| 1 | Chūō Line (Rapid) | for Ochanomizu and Tokyo |
| 2 | Chūō Line (Rapid) | for Shinjuku, Tachikawa, Takao, and Ōtsuki |
| 3 | Chūō-Sōbu Line | for Ochanomizu, Kinshichō, Tsudanuma, Chiba |
| 4 | Chūō-Sōbu Line | for Shinjuku, Nakano, and Mitaka |

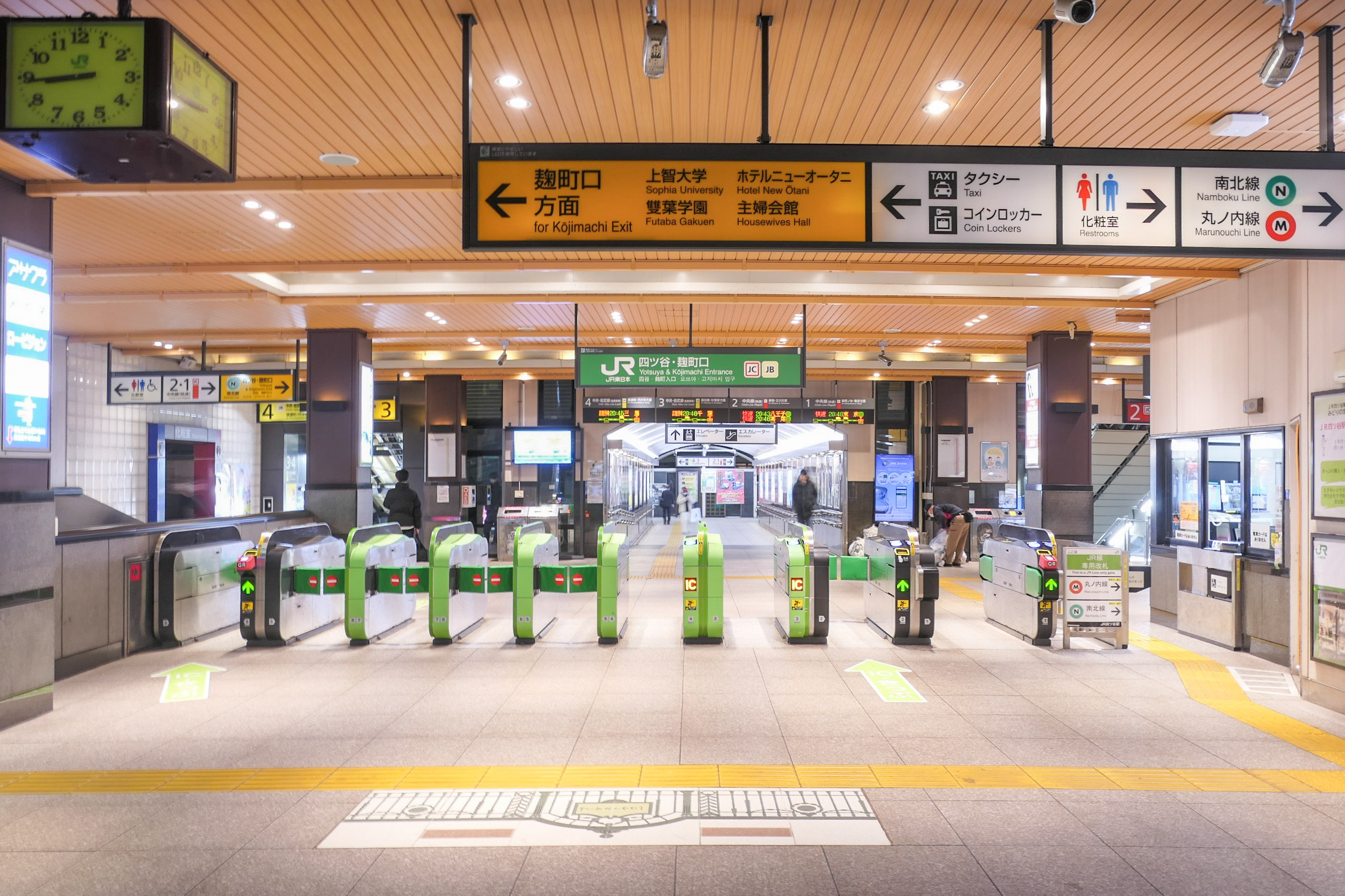
Ticket gates at Kojimachi exit

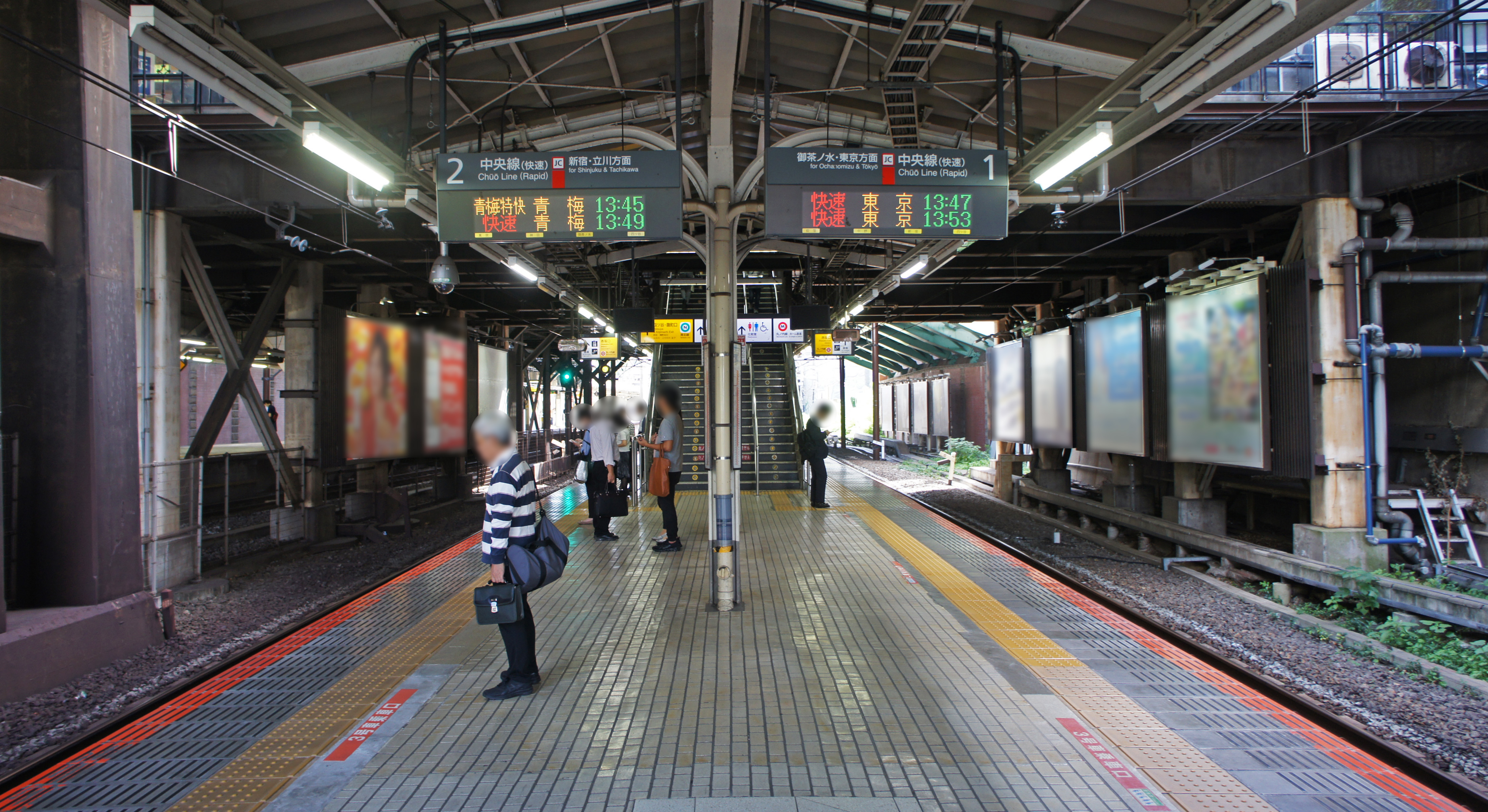
Platforms 1 and 2

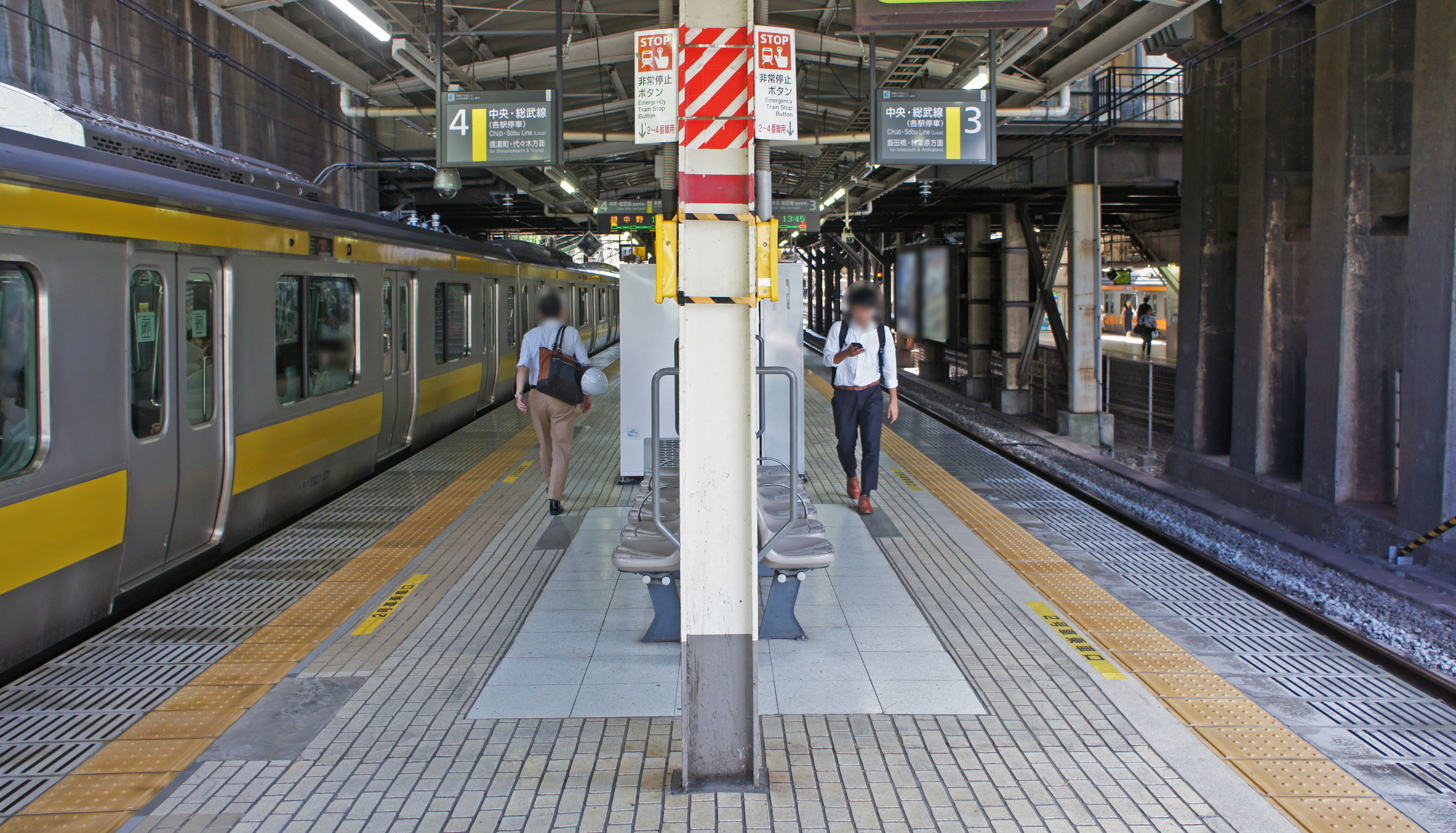
Platforms 3 and 4

=== Tokyo Metro ===
The Marunouchi Line station is elevated with two side platforms serving two tracks. The Namboku Line station is underground with one island platform serving two tracks.

1
Marunouchi Line
for Shinjuku, Nakano-Sakaue, and Ogikubo
2
Marunouchi Line
for Ginza, Otemachi, and Ikebukuro
3
Namboku Line
for Komagome, Akabane-Iwabuchi
Saitama Rapid Railway Line to Urawa-Misono
4
- for Shirokane-takanawa and Meguro
- Meguro Line for Hiyoshi
- Tokyu Shin-Yokohama Line for Shin-Yokohama Station
- Sotetsu Main Line for Ebina via the Tokyu/Sotetsu Shin-Yokohama Line

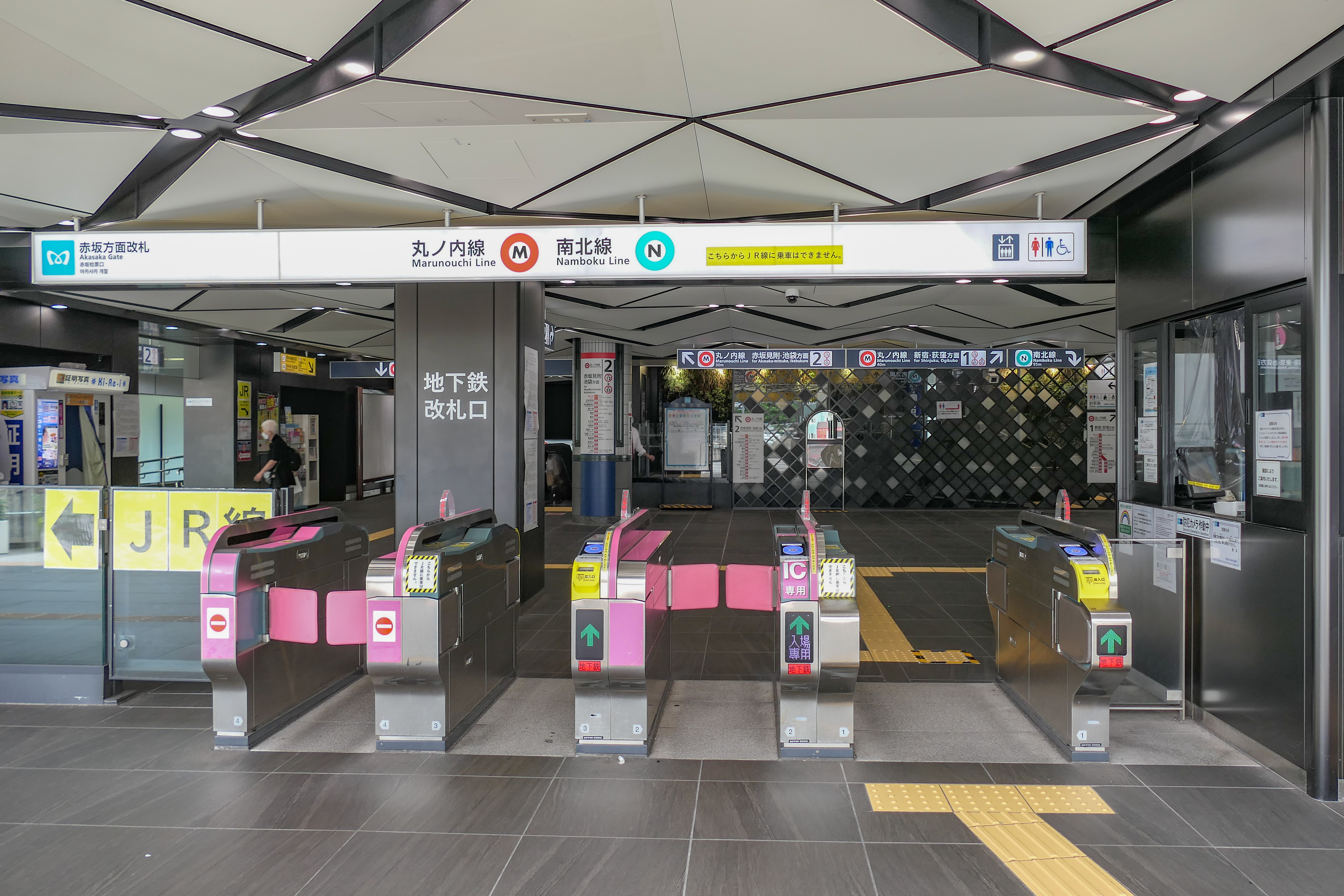
Akasaka ticket gates

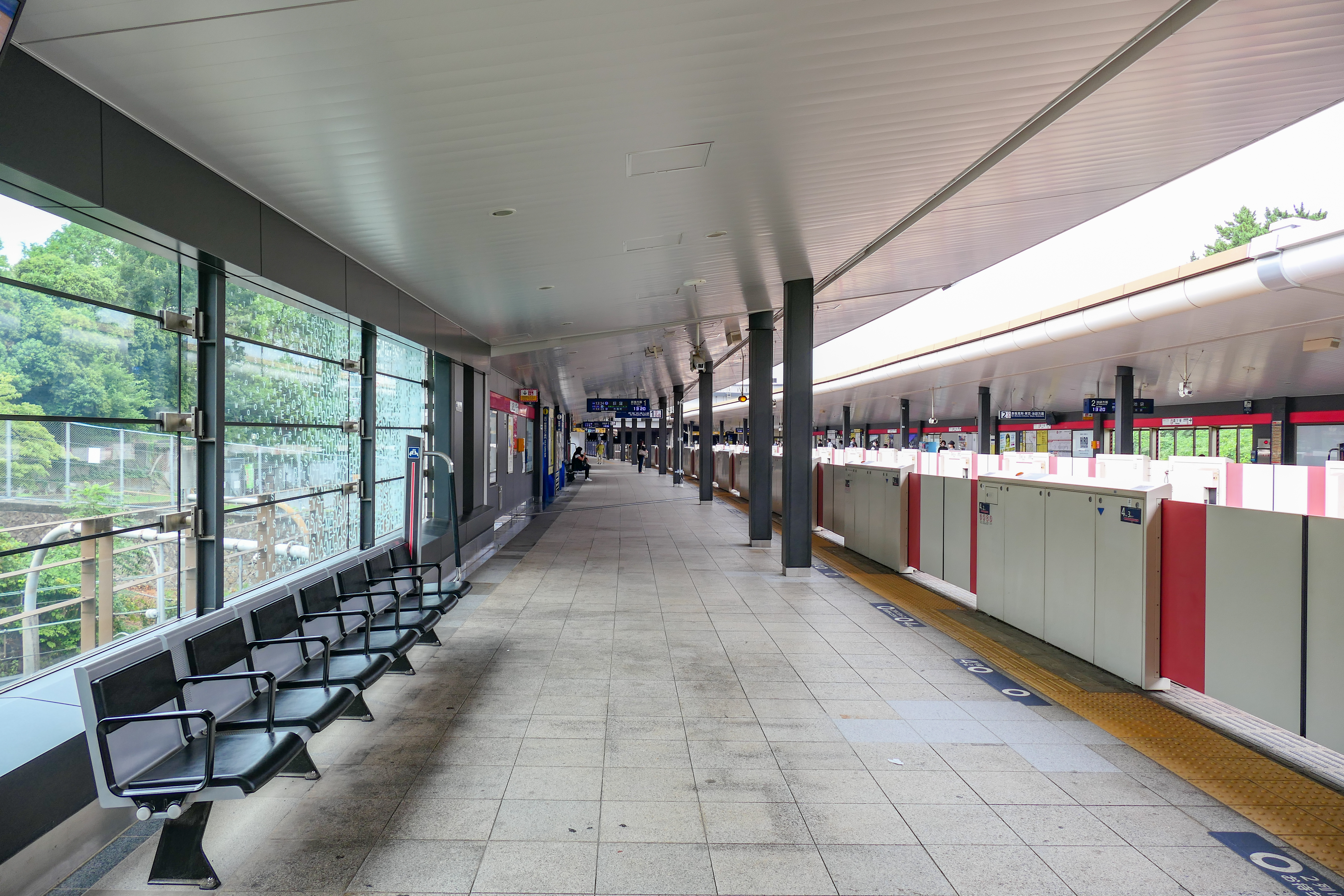
Platform 1

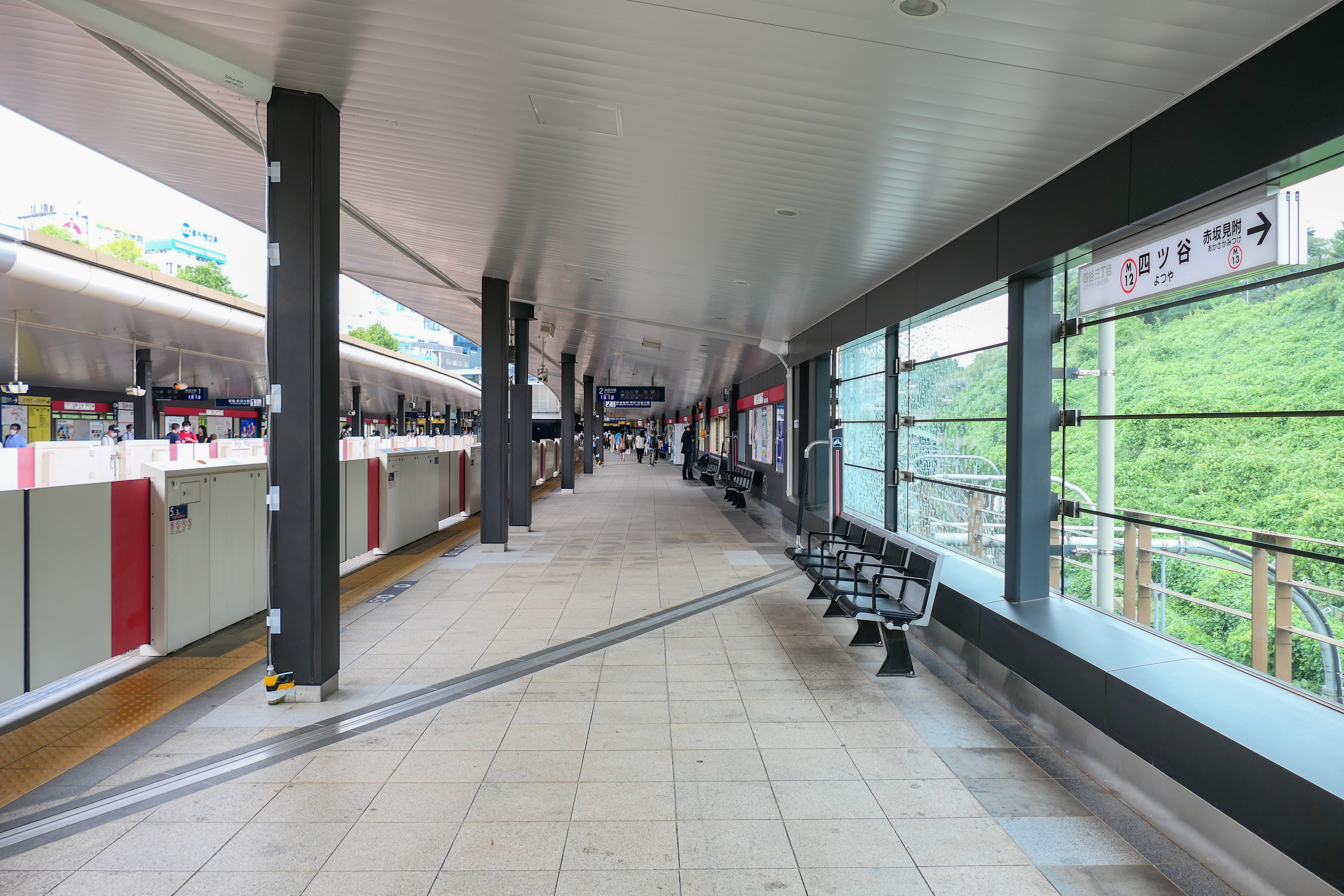
Platform 2

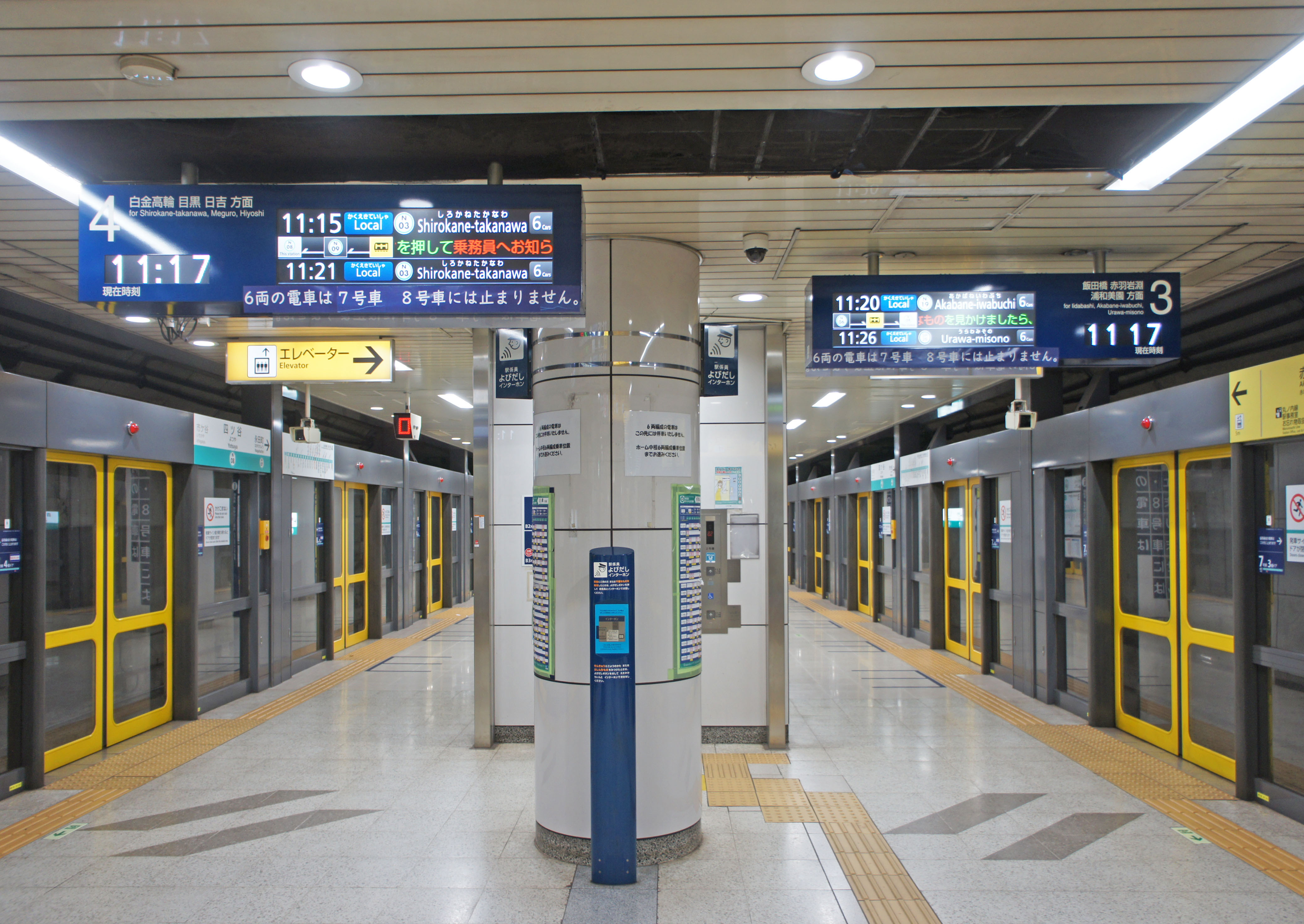
Platforms 3 and 4

== History ==
Yotsuya Station opened on 9 September 1894 as a station on the Kobu Railway, the forerunner of the Chūō Line which was nationalized in 1906. Although the line was originally single-track, the section passing through Yotsuya was double-tracked in 1895 and quadruple-tracked in 1929.

The Marunouchi Line station opened on 15 March 1959, and the Namboku Line station opened on 26 March 1996. Yotsuya was the southern terminus of the Namboku Line until the opening of Tameike-Sannō Station in 1997.

The station facilities of the Marunouchi and Namboku Lines were inherited by Tokyo Metro after the privatization of the Teito Rapid Transit Authority (TRTA) in 2004.

== Passenger statistics ==
In fiscal 2013, the JR East station was used by an average of 92,431 passengers daily (boarding passengers only), making it the 45th-busiest station operated by JR East. In fiscal 2013, the Tokyo Metro station was used by an average of 110,217 passengers per day (exiting and entering passengers), making it the 27th-busiest station operated by Tokyo Metro. The average daily passenger figures for each operator in previous years are as shown below.

| Fiscal year | JR East | Tokyo Metro |
|---|---|---|
| 2000 | 86,886 | |
| 2005 | 88,976 | |
| 2010 | 89,295 | |
| 2011 | 88,104 | 99,957 |
| 2012 | 90,122 | 104,101 |
| 2013 | 92,431 | 110,217 |

- Note that JR East figures are for boarding passengers only.

The Number of Passengers on Yotsuya as recorded by the East Japan Railway Company Trains in 2017-2022 was 25,896 (（単位 千人）).

== Surrounding area ==
The station is situated in the Yotsuya neighborhood on the boundary between Shinjuku and Chiyoda wards.

- Akasaka Palace
- Kioi Hall
- St. Ignatius Church

=== Universities and schools ===
- Sophia University
- Tokyo Chinese School
- Yotsuya Elementary School
- Nichibei Kaiwa Gakuin
- Nichibei Kaiwa Gakuin - Japanese Language Institute

=== Hotels ===
- Hotel New Otani
- Mitsui Garden Hotel Yotsuya
