= Japanese-style baseball =

Baseball game using a hard rubber ball

Japanese-style baseball or rubber-ball baseball (Japanese: 軟式野球, romanized: Nanshiki yakyū, lit. 'soft baseball') is a game that was created in Japan and is derived from baseball. It uses a hard rubber ball instead of a regular baseball made of leather. It has been rendered in English in a variety of ways, including nankyu baseball (nankyu means 'soft ball' in Japanese), nanshiki baseball and rubber baseball.

In a narrow sense, Japanese-style baseball is a game that uses a hollow rubber ball, and in a broad sense, it includes a semi-hard baseball where a hard ball's outer coating is replaced with rubber. In contrast, the ball used in softball is most often leather but is larger than a regular baseball.

Other than the use of a different ball, the rules of Japanese-style baseball and regular baseball are the same. However, the difference in the ball has a distinctive effect on the playing style and equipment, and also changes the way the players use their body.

It is played by both children and adults, men and women.

== History ==
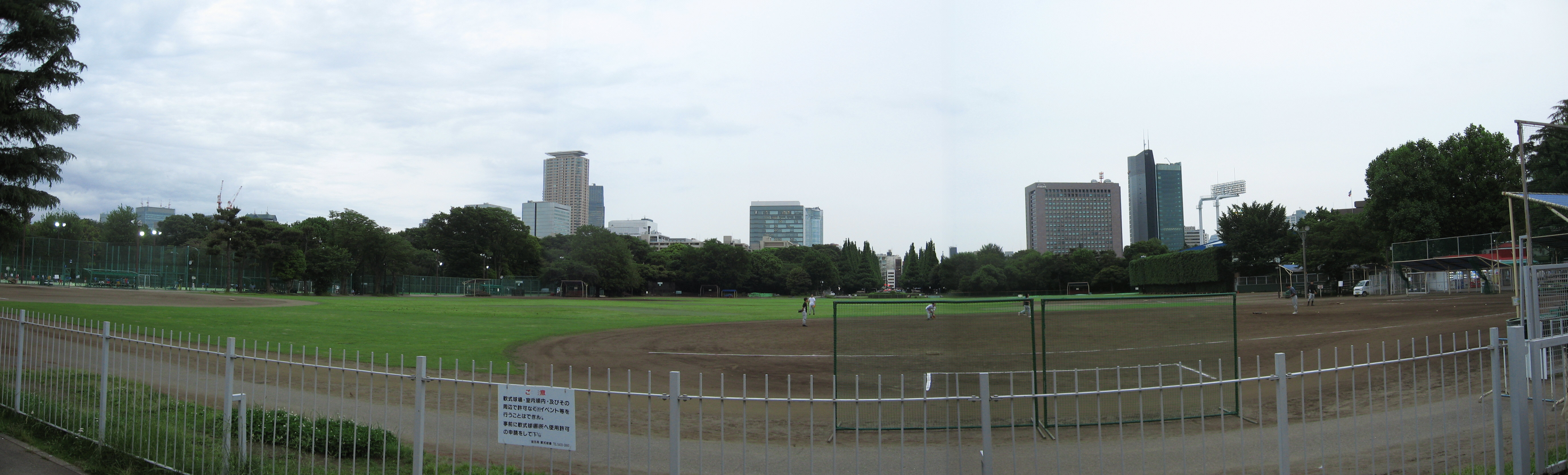
Ground in Meiji Shrine Outer Garden, Tokyo, where Japanese-style baseball is played

During the Meiji era (1868–1912), baseball introduced from the United States became established in Japan in national competitions for secondary schools, high schools, and colleges, and children enjoyed playing baseball using hard tennis balls. However, tennis balls had the drawback of being difficult to use due to problems with their durability and speed, and the number of people playing the sport gradually declined.

In 1919, Toshin Rubber, a company based in Kobe, sold the world's first rubber baseball.

In July 1919, at Kyoto Municipal Seitoku Elementary School (currently called Kyoto Culture Association (京都文化協会, Kyōto bunka kyōkai)) in Shimogyo-ku in the city of Kyoto, a Japanese-style baseball tournament was held for the first time in the world. There is a bronze statue in Takaragaike Park Youth Sports Park (宝が池公園 少年スポーツ広場, Takaragaike kōen shōnen supōtsu hiroba) in Kyoto, marking it as the birthplace of nanshiki baseball.

This triggered an increase in the population of young people playing baseball again, and the following year, in 1920, the Japan Association of Youth Baseball (大日本少年野球協会, Dai-nippon shōnen yakyū-kyōkai) was established in Kobe, and a full-fledged national tournament of youth baseball was held.

The ball for general use in Japanese-style baseball was first sold in 1922. At that time, a man named Sakae Suzuka (鈴鹿 栄, Suzuka Sakae), the inventor of the ball used in Japanese-style baseball, named it the "softball" (nanshiki bōru), and the baseball played with this ball "softball baseball" (nanshiki yakyū).

Later in 1925, a man called Haruno Yokoi (横井 春野, Yokoi Haruno) formed a youth baseball association in Tokyo.

== Ball types ==
The ball has undergone a number of revisions, but the current dimensions were set out in December 2016 by the Japan Rubber Baseball Association (公益財団法人全日本軟式野球連盟) and the Baseball Ball Manufacturers Association (野球ボール工業会).

Two types are specified: type M (major) and type J (junior). Type M has a diameter of 71.5–72.5 millimetres (2.81–2.85 in). Meanwhile, type J has a diameter of 68.5–69.5 millimetres (2.70–2.74 in).

In comparison, a regulation leather baseball is 73–75 millimetres (2.9–3.0 in) in diameter. An 11-inch ball used in softball has a diameter of about 89 millimetres (3.5 in).

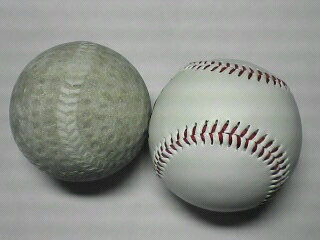
Ball used in Japanese-style baseball (2006 version, left) and a typical leather (horsehide or cowhide) baseball (right)

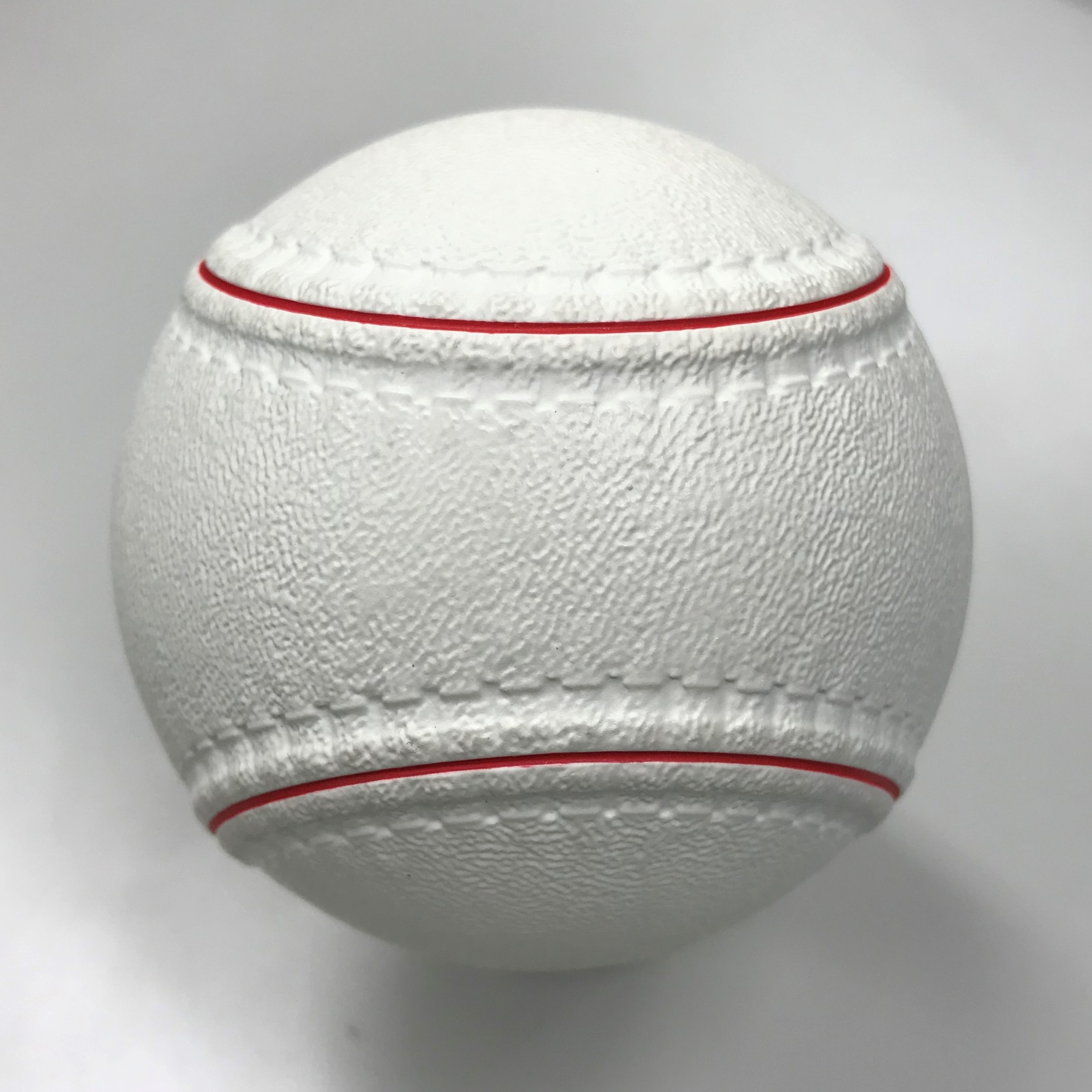
A K-Ball, developed in 2000 with the aim of facilitating a smooth transition from Japanese-style baseball to regular baseball at high school. Its size and weight are the same as a hardball but its structure is the same as a Japanese-style baseball ball (rubber and hollow).

== Bat types ==
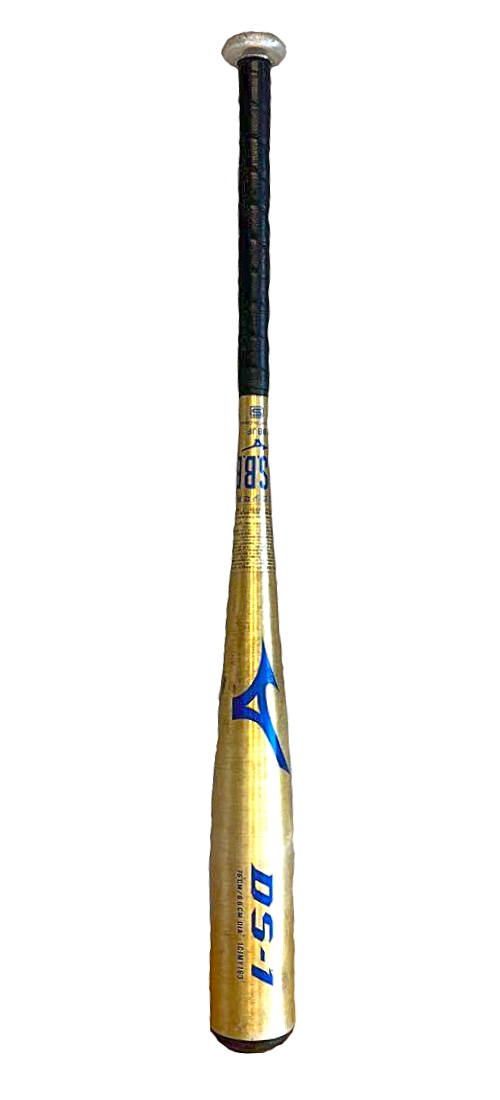
Nanshiki baseball bat made of super duralumin

Metal and wooden bats are used in regular (hard) baseball; however, the bats used in Japanese-style baseball are metal or carbon ones that can handle rubber balls.

== Major competitions in Japan ==
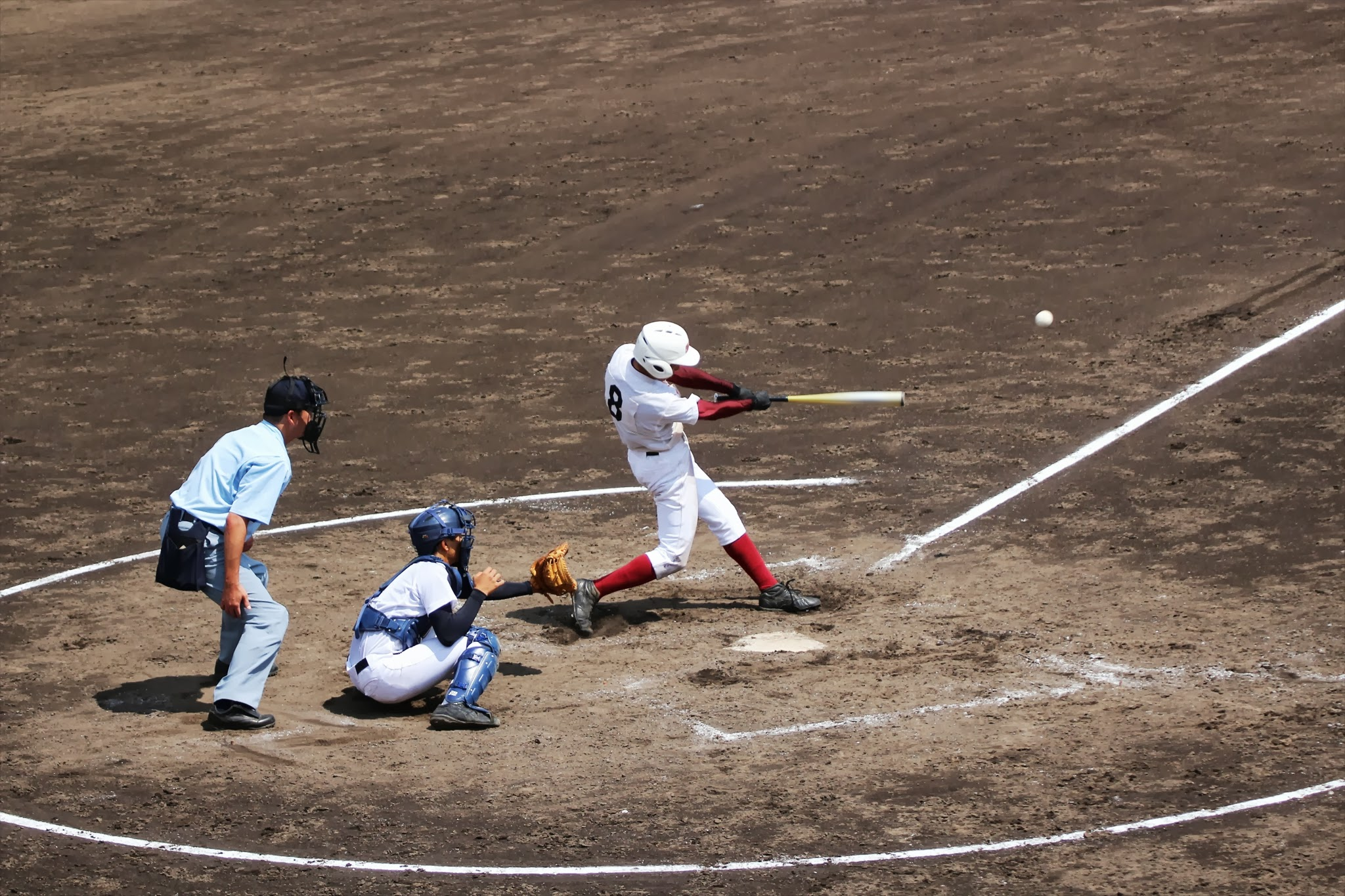
58th National High School Nanshiki Baseball Championship (2013)

A large number of competitions are played in Japan, including:

General public

- All Japan Baseball Tournament (Men's Tournament)
- Emperor's Cup All-Japan Baseball Tournament
- Takamatsu Miyagi Cup All-Japan Baseball Tournament (Division 1, Division 2)
- All-Japan Women's Nanshiki Championship (organized by the All-Japan Women's Nanshiki Federation, general women's baseball)
- National Sports Festival (Men's Competition)

College students

- All Japan University Baseball Championship (Spring)
- All Japan University Women's Nanshiki Baseball Championship

Vocational school students

- All Japan Vocational School Nanshiki Championship

High school students

- All Japan High School Baseball Championship (organized by the Japan High School Baseball Federation)

== Global popularity ==
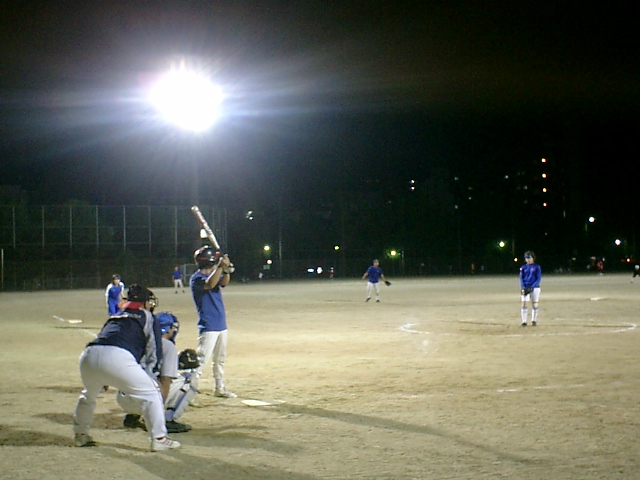
Night game in progress in Osaka

Cuba has a game that is somewhat akin to Japanese-style baseball called cuatro esquinas, and baseball similar to nanshiki baseball is also played in Taiwan.

Japanese-style baseball is often played by university teams, and there is a World University Japanese-style Baseball Tournament (Japanese: 世界大学軟式野球大会, romanized: Sekai daigaku nanshiki yakyū taikai) that sometimes is held in Japan and sometimes in places such as the United States, Guam and Taiwan. It was held in Guam in 2019 and most recently, in Taiwan in 2024.

In addition, the International Boys Nankyu Baseball World Championship (Japanese: 少年軟式野球世界大会, romanized: Shōnen nanshiki yakyū sekai taikai), an international tourney for players under the age of 12, takes place annually. Organized by the International Boys Nankyu Baseball Association Japan, it is held in Tokyo, Japan, usually in July. Recent tournaments have been held in Edogawa Baseball Stadium. In 2023, a total of 12 teams participated; four from Japan, two from the Philippines, and one each from Australia, Brazil, China, Paraguay, Singapore, and Taiwan.

International Boys Nankyu Baseball World Championship
Month/Year	Series	Venue	Winner
Aug 1983	1st	Tachikawa, Tokyo	Chinese Taipei (1)
Aug 1984	2nd		Philippines
Aug 1985	3rd		Chinese Taipei (2)
Aug 1986	4th	Shinjuku, Tokyo	China (1)
Aug 1987	5th		Chinese Taipei (3)
Aug 1988	6th		Chinese Taipei (4)
Aug 1989	7th	Bunkyo, Tokyo	China (2)
Jul 1990	8th	Edogawa, Tokyo	Brazil
Jul 1991	9th		China (3)
Jul 1992	10th		Chinese Taipei (5)
Jul 1993	11th		China (4)
Jul 1994	12th		Japan (1)
Jul 1995	13th		Japan (2)
Jul 1996	14th		China (5)
Jul 1997	15th		China (6)
Jul 1998	16th		Mexico (1)
Jul 1999	17th		China (7)
Jul 2000	18th		Chinese Taipei (6)
Jul 2001	19th	Edogawa	Chinese Taipei (7)
Jul 2002	20th	Edogawa	Mexico (2)
Jul 2003	21st	Edogawa	Mexico (3)
Jul 2004	22nd	Edogawa	Mexico (4)
Jul 2005	23rd	Edogawa	Mexico (5)
Jul 2006	24th	Edogawa	Chinese Taipei (8)
Jul 2007	25th	Edogawa	Mexico (6)
Jul 2008	26th	Edogawa	Chinese Taipei (9)
Jul 2009	27th	Edogawa	Japan (3)
Jul 2010	28th	Edogawa	China (8)
Jul 2011	29th	Event Cancelled (Great East Japan Earthquake)	
Jul 2012	30th	Edogawa	Chinese Taipei (10)
Jul 2013	31st	Edogawa	Japan (4)
Jul 2014	32nd	Edogawa	Japan (5)
Jul 2015	33rd	Edogawa	Japan (6)
Jul 2016	34th	Edogawa	Chinese Taipei (11)
Jul 2017	35th	Edogawa	Japan (7)
Jul 2018	36th	Edogawa	Japan (8)
Jul 2019	37th	Misato, Saitama	Chinese Taipei (12)
Jul 2020	38th	Event Cancelled (COVID-19 pandemic)	
Jul 2021	39th	Event Cancelled (COVID-19 pandemic)	
Jul 2022	40th	Event Cancelled (COVID-19 pandemic)	
Jul 2023	41st	Edogawa	Japan (9)
Jul 2024	42nd	Edogawa	Chinese Taipei (13)
Jul 2025	43rd	Edogawa	Japan (10)

Roll of Honour
Champion	Wins
Chinese Taipei	13
Japan	10
China	8
Mexico	6
Brazil	1
Philippines	1

Shown in alphabetical order in the event of a tie.
