= Daikyōchō =

Daikyōchō 大京町
- District
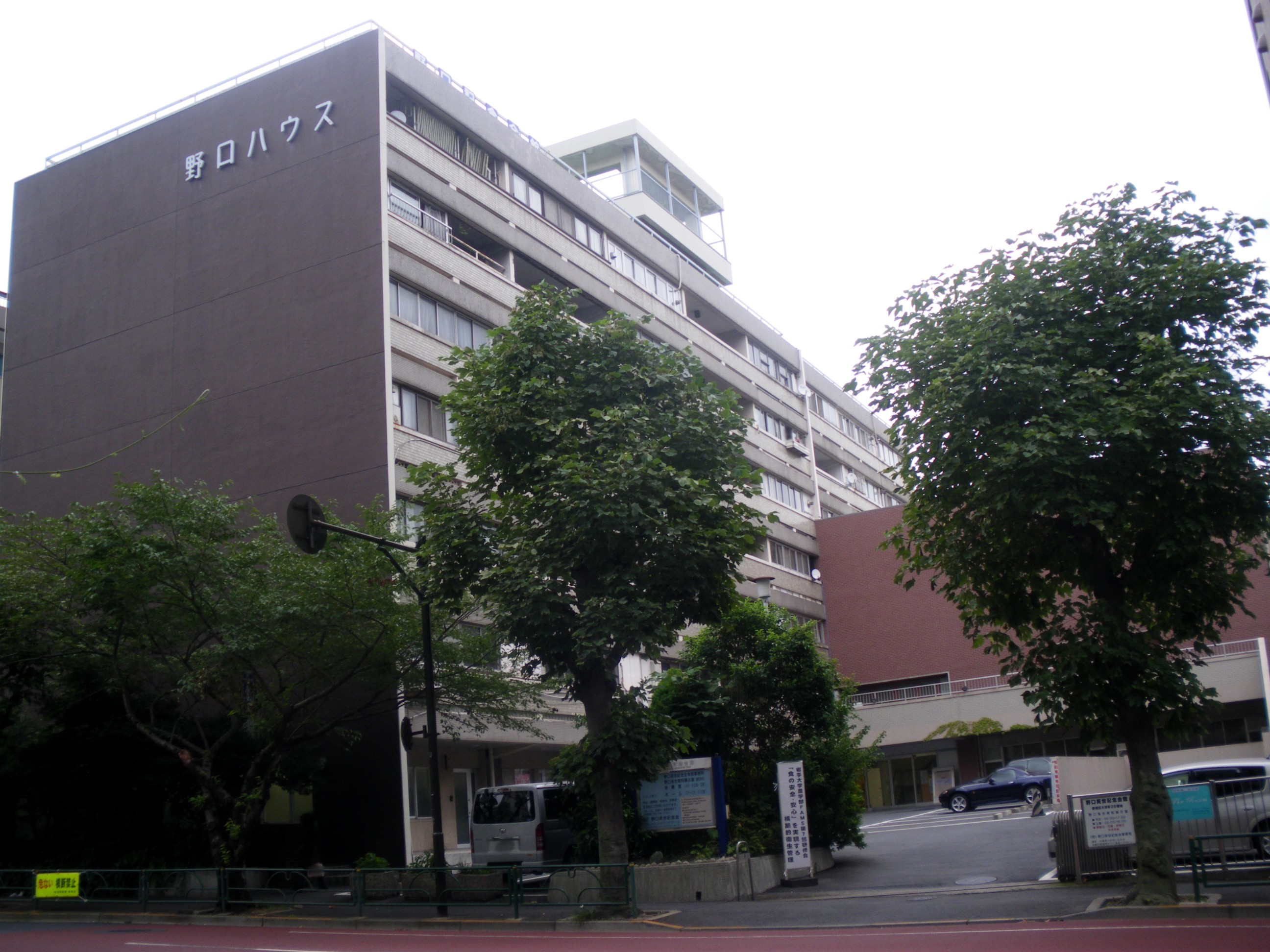
- Hideyo Noguchi Memorial Hall

- Location of Daikyōchō within Tokyo
- Coordinates: 35°41′6.64″N 139°43′4.82″E
- Country: Japan
- Region: Kantō
- Prefecture: Tokyo
- Ward: Shinjuku

Population (December 1, 2019)
  - Total: 3,717
- Time zone: UTC+9 (JST)
- Zip code: 160-0015
- Area code: 03

Daikyōchō (大京町, Daikyōmachi) is a district of Shinjuku, Tokyo, Japan. It is a single town name that does not have any districts or sub-sections (i.e., "-chome"). Thus, no residential addressing system has been implemented and the postal code is 160-0015.

== Demographics ==
The number of households and population of each chōme as of December 1, 2019 are as follows:

| Chome | Number of households | population |
|---|---|---|
| Daikyōchō | 2,234 households | 3,717 people |

== Education ==
The Shinjuku City Board of Education operates public elementary and junior high schools. Daikyōchō is zoned to Yotsuya No. 6 (Dairoku) Elementary School (四谷第六小学校) and Yotsuya Junior High School (四谷中学校).
