= Tokyo Metro =

Subway system in Greater Tokyo, Japan

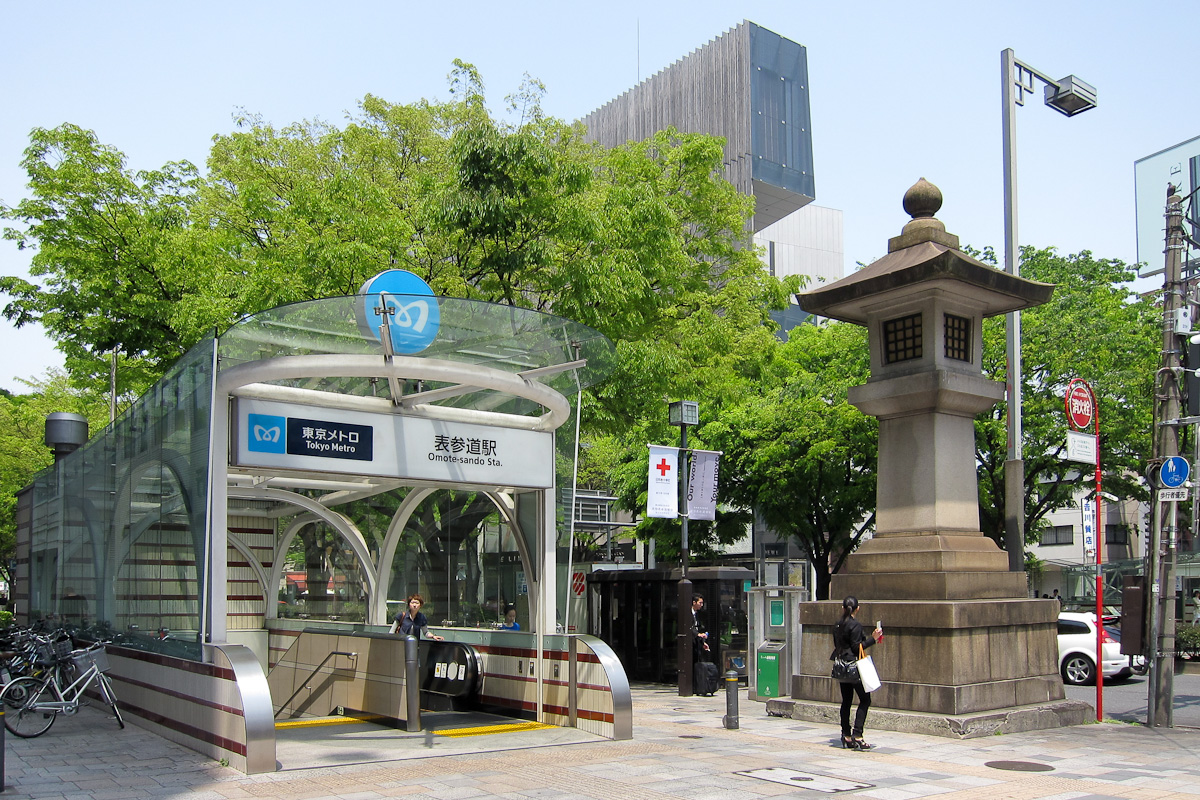
- Omote-sando Station entrance

Overview
- Native name: 東京メトロ
- Owner: Tokyo Metro Co., Ltd. (Note: public kabushiki gaisha controlled by the Government of Japan (26.71%) and the Tokyo Metropolitan Government (23.29%); traded as TYO: 9023))
- Locale: Greater Tokyo Area, Japan
- Transit type: Rapid transit
- Number of lines: 9
- Number of stations: 180; 5 (under construction)
- Daily ridership: 7.04 million (FY 2025)
- Website: Tokyo Metro

Operation
- Began operation: 30 December 1927; 98 years ago (Note: Operated as the Tokyo Underground Railway at launch; partially operated as the Tokyo Rapid Railway from 5 September 1934 (92 years ago); merged into the Teito Rapid Transit Authority on 4 July 1941 (85 years ago); and established under its current name on 1 April 2004 (22 years ago).)
- Operators: Tokyo Metro Co., Ltd.
- Number of vehicles: 2,773 cars (2012)

Technical
- System length: 195.1 km (121.2 mi)
- Track gauge: 1,067 mm (3 ft 6 in); 1,435 mm (4 ft 8 1/2 in) standard gauge (Note: Ginza & Marunouchi lines)
- Electrification: 1,500 V DC overhead catenary 600 V DC third rail (Note: Ginza & Marunouchi lines)
- Top speed: 100 km/h (62 mph) (Note: Tōzai Line)
System map
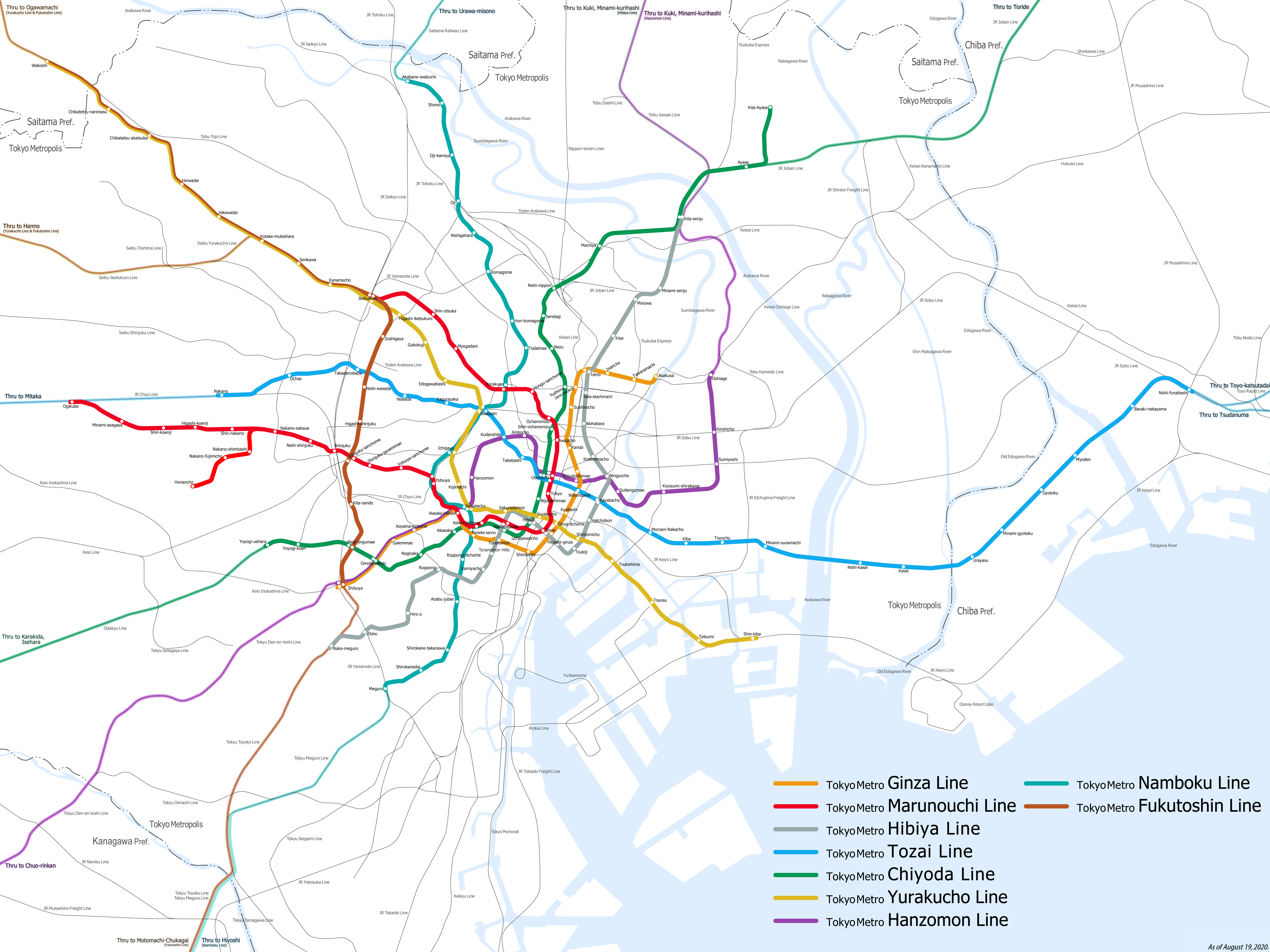
Tokyo Metro lines (Other railway lines are shown as thin lines.)

The Tokyo Metro (Japanese: 東京メトロ) is a major rapid transit system in Tokyo, Japan, operated by the Tokyo Metro Co., Ltd. (Note: Wakōshi Station on the Yurakucho Line and Fukutoshin Line is located in Saitama Prefecture, while the section east of Urayasu Station on the Tōzai Line lies in Chiba Prefecture. Article 1 of the Tokyo Metro Co., Ltd. Act (Act No. 188 of 2002) defines the company as “a corporation whose purpose is to operate railway services and related businesses, primarily underground, in and around the special wards of Tokyo.”) The system opened in 1927 as the Tokyo Underground Railway, becoming the first subway system in Asia. (Note: Earlier underground passenger railway sections had existed in Japan, most notably a short tunnel opened in 1925 by the Miyagi Electric Railway (宮城電気鉄道) near Sendai Station on what is now part of the Senseki Line, but these were not part of a dedicated urban subway network.) It is the larger of Tokyo's two subway operators, with an average daily ridership of 6.52 million; the other operator, the Toei Subway, carries approximately 2.85 million passengers per day as of 2023.

Tokyo Metro Co., Ltd. is a special company established on April 1, 2004, through the privatization of the Teito Rapid Transit Authority (TRTA). Tokyo Metro operates a network comprising 9 distinct subway lines and 11 routes with 180 stations totaling 195.0 km (121.2 mi). Eight of these lines were inherited directly from the TRTA, including the historic Ginza Line which was once operated by Tokyo Underground Railway and the Tokyo Rapid Railway. The ninth line, the Fukutoshin Line, opened in 2008 after the launch of the new private company.

The company has been a member of the Japan Private Railway Association and it is formally recognized as Japan's 16th major private railway company.

Operating exclusively within Tokyo and Tokyo metropolitan area with massive commuter and student populations, Tokyo Metro owns and manages nine essential subway lines, leading all other major private railways in total number of train carriages, railway operating revenue, and annual passenger numbers.

Tokyo Metro Co., Ltd. was initially wholly owned by the Japanese government specifically the Minister of Finance and the Tokyo Metropolitan Government. Following a public offering where half of the shares were sold to private investors, the company was listed on the Tokyo Stock Exchange's Prime Market on October 23, 2024. The company was scheduled to be listed on the stock exchange following the opening of the Fukutoshin Line on June 14, 2008. However, after several postponements it was finally listed on October 23, 2024, becoming a public company. Although the company initially aimed for full privatization, even after the 2024 listing, the national government (nominally the Minister of Finance) and the Tokyo Metropolitan Government continue to hold a combined 50% of the shares, meaning the company remains a special company subject to the Tokyo Metro Co., Ltd. Act.

The proceeds from the sale of the government-owned shares will be allocated to the reconstruction budget for the Great East Japan Earthquake, while the proceeds from the sale of the Tokyo Metropolitan Government-owned shares will be used to fund railway network strengthening projects such as subway extensions for the Namboku and Yurakucho Lines and urban resilience projects like disaster prevention measures.

Among the 23 special wards of Tokyo, only Ōta, Setagaya, and Katsushika lack Tokyo Metro lines or stations. (Note: Of these wards, Ōta Ward is served by the Toei Subway, with Magome Station and Nishi-Magome Station on the Asakusa Line. Ayase Station was originally planned and constructed while located in Katsushika Ward. However, prior to its opening, a ward boundary revision transferred the station to Adachi, leaving Katsushika Ward without any railway stations. Setagaya Ward is served by the Tokyu Den-en-toshi Line, a non–Tokyo Metro and non–Toei railway line, with the underground section between Ikejiri-Ōhashi Station and Futako-Tamagawa Station located within the ward.) Despite this, Tokyo Metro provides service to all three wards through through-running arrangements with other operators.

== History ==
=== Early years ===
The first plan to build a subway in Tokyo dates to 1906, when the Tokyo Underground Electric Railway (東京地下電気鉄道), founded by Momosuke Fukuzawa, applied for licenses to construct lines between Takanawa and Asakusa and between Ginza and Shinjuku. However, the proposal was rejected by the Tokyo City government due to budgetary constraints. In 1915, an underground railway exclusively for mail transport was opened beneath Tokyo Station by the Ministry of Communications.

In 1917, the Imperial Railway Association and the Japan Society of Civil Engineers, acting on commission from the Ministry of Home Affairs, established the Tokyo City and Area Transportation Research Committee (東京市内外交通調査委員会). The committee proposed five subway lines connecting major private railway terminals along the Yamanote Line.

=== Tokyo Underground Railway era ===
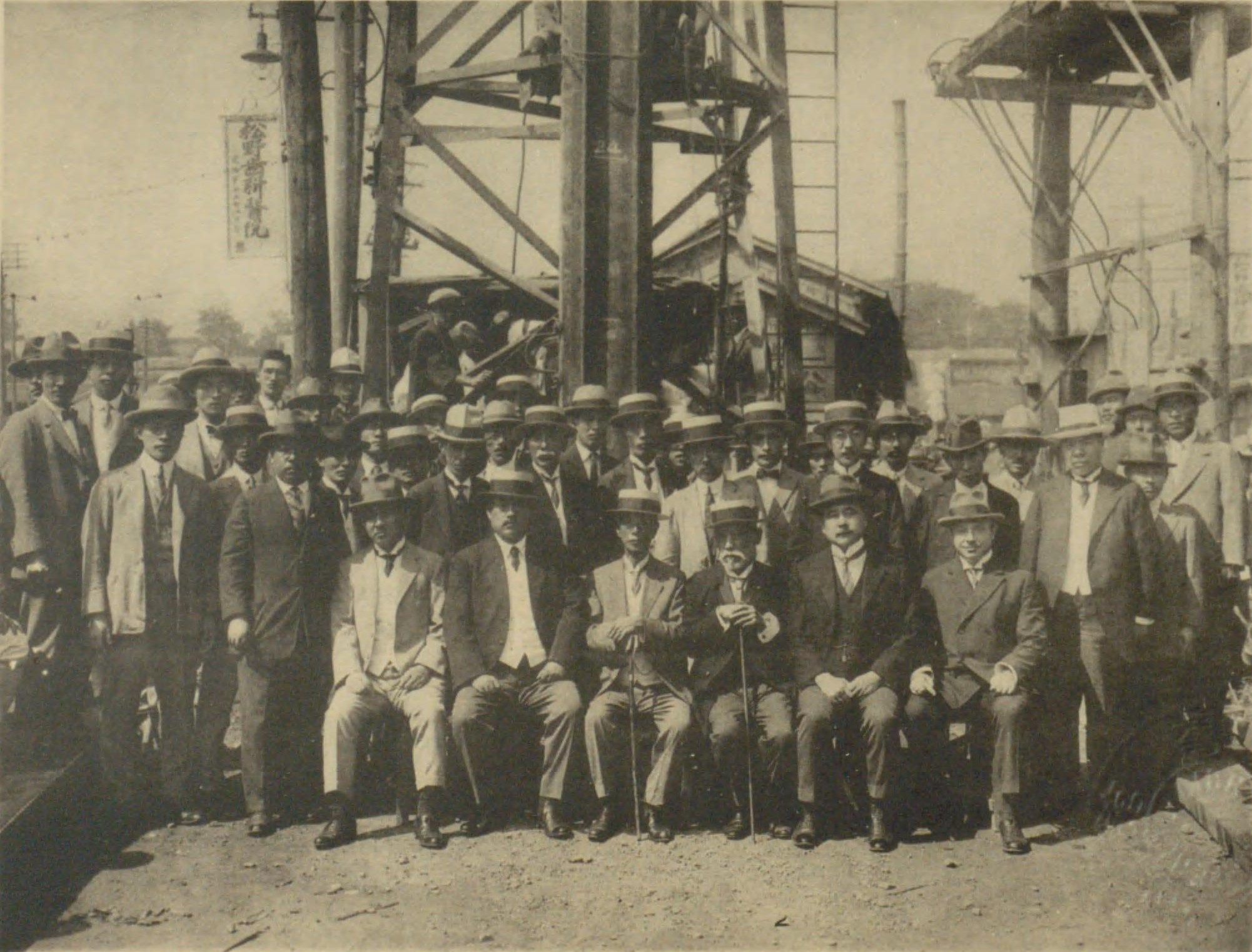
The groundbreaking of the Tokyo Underground Railway on September 27, 1925

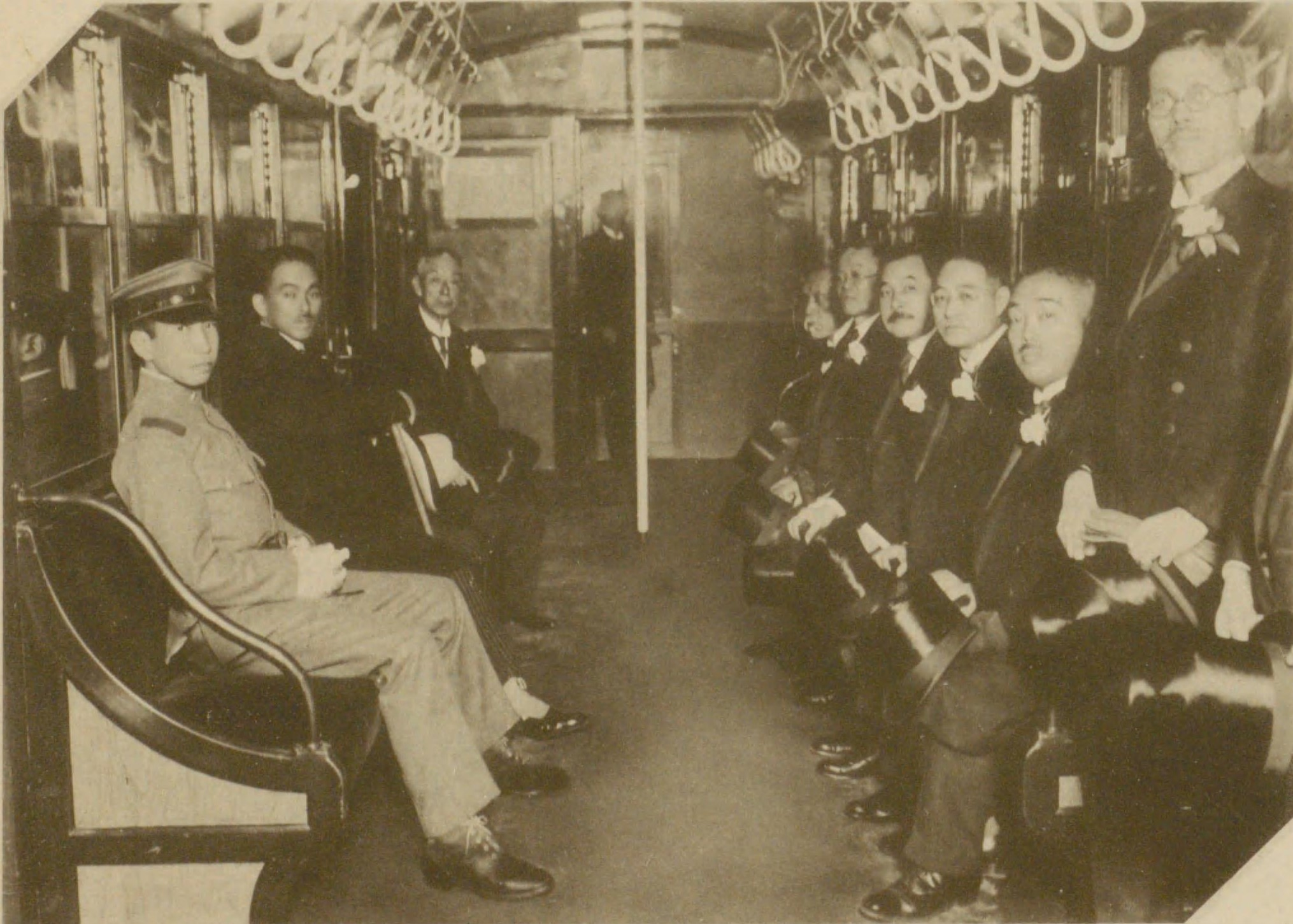
Prince Asaka and Prince Takeda riding a train before the opening of the Ginza Line on December 29, 1927

The origin of Tokyo Metro traces back to the Tokyo Underground Light Rail (東京軽便地下鉄道) which was officially established in 1917. On November 17, 1919, the Tokyo Underground Light Rail was granted licenses with other private railway companies for its proposed sections, Takanawa-Minamimachi and Asakusa Kōen Hirokōji, as well as between Kurumazaka and Minamisenju. In August 1920, the Tokyo Underground Railway (東京地下鉄道) was established by Noritsugu Hayakawa, inheriting the original licenses.

The Great Kantō Earthquake of 1923 profoundly altered subway planning. Several private operators abandoned their plans, and their licenses expired by 1924. The Tokyo Underground Railway submitted new applications to build an expanded network, but most were withdrawn or rejected, and some existing licenses expired due to missed deadlines. In 1925, Tokyo City asserted control over subway development and secured licenses for most planned routes, leaving the Tokyo Underground Railway with only Ueno–Asakusa section.

Following a period of preparation, construction on the city's first subway tunnel commenced on September 27, 1925. This section, connecting Asakusa and Ueno stations opened on December 30, 1927. Marketed as "the only underground railway in the Orient," it became the foundation of what is known today as the Ginza Line. Later that year, the line was extended to Kanda in 1931 and to Kyobashi in 1932. Subsequently, the line was extended to Shimbashi Station on June 21, 1934.

==== Tokyo Rapid Railway ====
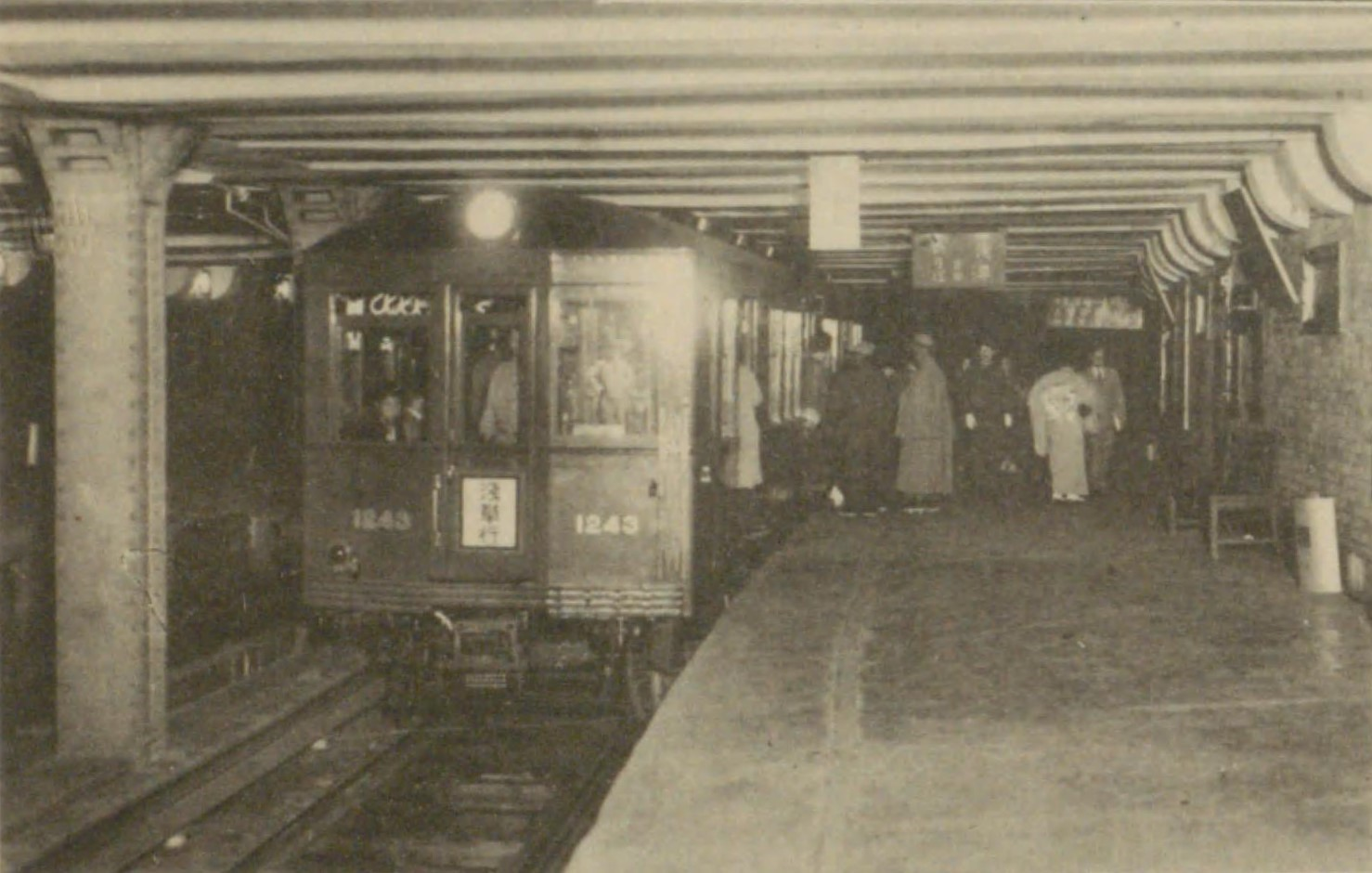
Ueno Station, 1934.

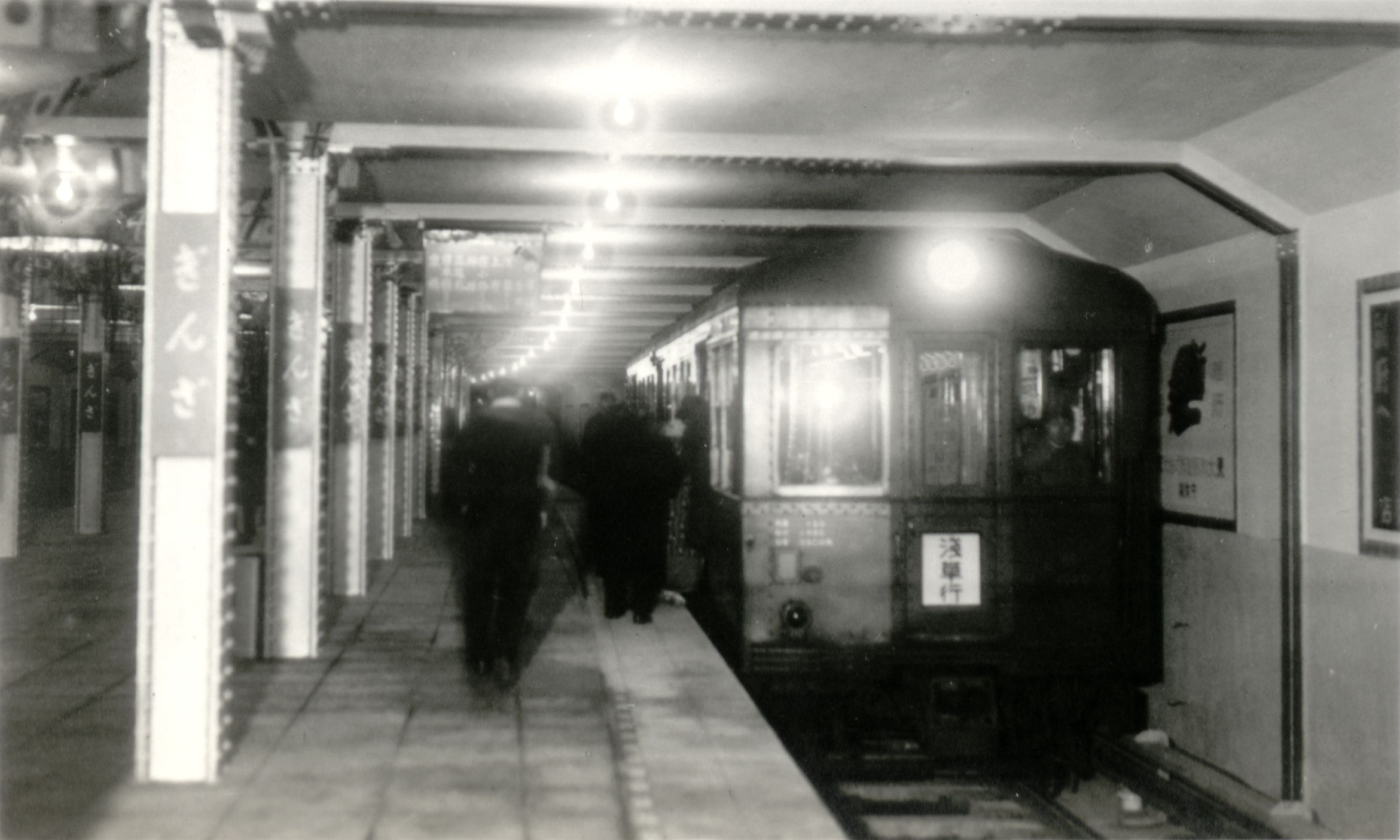
Ginza Station in the 1930s

Encouraged by the commercial success of the Tokyo Underground Railway, a group of private entrepreneurs concluded that subway operations in Tokyo could be profitable and petitioned for the transfer of subway construction licenses held by Tokyo City. The city approved the request, and on September 5, 1934, Tokyo Rapid Railway (東京高速鉄道) was established to construct and operate the lines. Although the license conditions required the company’s establishment by the previous year, its founding was delayed due to funding difficulties. Keita Gotō, president of the Tokyo–Yokohama Electric Railway, later joined as a promoter and assumed a central role in the company’s management.

The transferred licenses covered the Shibuya–Tokyo (Marunouchi) and the Shinjuku–Tokyo (Tsukiji). Construction began from Shibuya, where the Tokyo–Yokohama Electric Railway terminated. On November 18, 1938, the section between Aoyama-Rokuchōme and Toranomon opened, followed by the Shibuya–Aoyama-Rokuchōme section on December 20. Due to financial constraints, stations were built to accommodate only three-car trains, leading to operational issues when train lengths increased after World War II. Plans for through service with the Tokyo Underground Railway initially met resistance, but government mediation resulted in an agreement in the mid-1930s. On January 15, 1939, the extension to Shimbashi was completed.

On September 16, 1939, through services between the Tokyo Underground Railway and the Tokyo Rapid Railway commenced via Shimbashi Station, effectively forming what is now the Tokyo Metro Ginza Line.

=== Teito Rapid Transit Authority era ===
Under the State General Mobilization Law of 1938, enacted to consolidate transport during the Second Sino-Japanese War, bus and tram services were transferred to the Tokyo Metropolitan Government. Its establishment was originally conceived as a form of “transportation adjustment,” a system intended to integrate and stabilize transportation operators struggling with competition during the Great Depression. On September 1, 1941, the city's two private subway companies, Tokyo Underground Railway and Tokyo Rapid Railway were absorbed by the newly established Teito Rapid Transit Authority (TRTA).

While most other government organizations were dissolved by the Supreme Commander for the Allied Powers (SCAP/GHQ) after Japan's defeat in the World War II, the TRTA was permitted to continue. This exemption was granted because its purpose was recognized as the long-term development of urban transit rather than purely for military objectives. In the postwar era, the TRTA functioned as a unique public corporation, utilizing fiscal investment and loans to fund the expansion of new subway lines. Uniquely for a state-affiliated body, it also joined the Japan Private Railway Association (Mintetsukyo), reflecting its hybrid nature of public mission and private-style management.

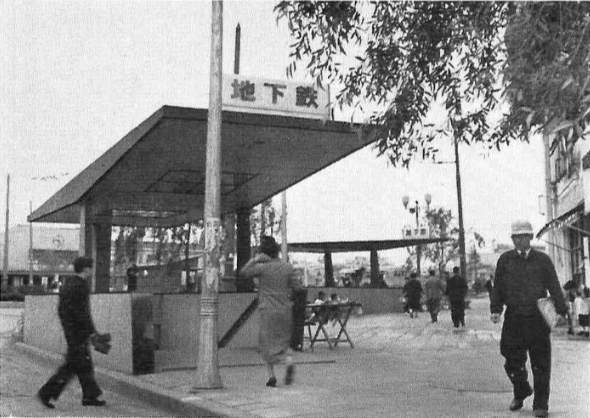
Exit at Ikebukuro Station on the Teito Rapid Transit Marunouchi Line, 1954.

In the post-war period, the TRTA operated as a special corporation jointly funded by the Japanese government (initially via the Japanese National Railways, later directly) and the Tokyo Metropolitan Government, leading to rapid expansion in the post-World War II era, including the construction of key lines in the 50s and 60s like the Marunouchi (1954), Hibiya (1961), Tozai (1964) and Chiyoda (1969) . By 1969, TRTA's network exceeded 100 kilometers, and further growth in the 1970s.

The process for the privatization of the TRTA was initiated by a report from the Temporary Council for Administrative Reform Promotion on June 10, 1986. Following subsequent cabinet decisions in February 1995 and December 2001, the necessary legislation was prepared.

=== Tokyo Metro Co., Ltd. era ===
The Tokyo Metro Co., Ltd. Act was promulgated on December 18, 2002. This act facilitated the transition of the TRTA into a private entity, which officially became Tokyo Metro Co., Ltd. on April 1, 2004.

Tokyo Metro Co., Ltd., a joint-stock company majority-owned by national and Tokyo metropolitan governments to enhance operational flexibility and service quality. Significant milestones followed, including the opening of the Fukutoshin Line on June 14, 2008, extending connectivity in central Tokyo, and the start of through-service operations with Sotetsu and Tokyu lines on March 18, 2023, improving regional connectivity. In a major financial step, Tokyo Metro conducted an initial public offering on October 23, 2024, raising ¥348.6 billion (approximately $2.3 billion) through 2.32 billion shares priced at ¥1,200 each, marking Japan's largest IPO since 2018 and signaling confidence in its role serving an average of 6.84 million daily passengers.

The logo was designed by the British brand consultancy agency Wolff Olins.

=== Chronology ===
- August 29, 1920 – Tokyo Underground Railway Co., Ltd. is founded.
- September 27, 1925 – Construction begins on the Tokyo Subway between Asakusa and Ueno.
- December 30, 1927 – Tokyo Underground Railway begins the first subway service between Asakusa and Ueno.

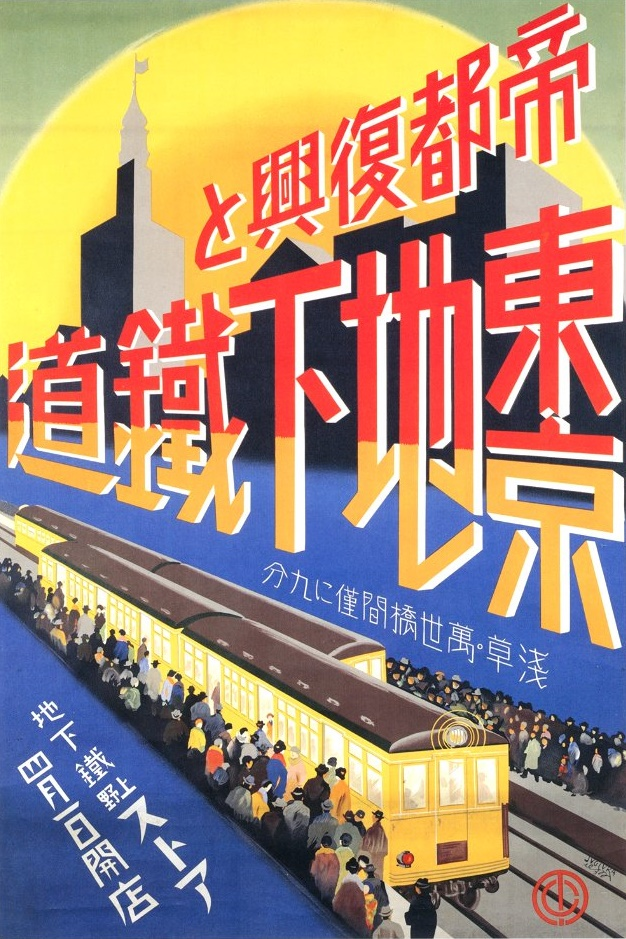
Art Deco poster for the extension and opening of Manseibashi Station (circa 1929), titled "The Reconstruction of the Imperial Capital and the Tokyo Underground Railway."

- September 5, 1934 – Tokyo Rapid Railway Co., Ltd. is founded.
- November 18, 1938 – Tokyo Rapid Railway begins the first subway service between Aoyama-rokuchome and Toranomon.
- September 16, 1939 – Tokyo Underground Railway and Tokyo Rapid Railway begin direct through service between Asakusa and Shibuya.
- July 4, 1941 – The Teito Rapid Transit Authority is established.
- April 20, 1951 – Civil engineering work begins on the Marunouchi Line between Ikebukuro and Shinjuku.
- January 20, 1954 – The Marunouchi Line opens between Ikebukuro and Ochanomizu.
- March 15, 1959 – The Marunouchi Line opens between Kasumigaseki and Shinjuku, completing the full line between Ikebukuro and Shinjuku.
- March 28, 1961 – The Hibiya Line opens between Minamisenju and Naka-Okachimachi.
- March 23, 1962 – The Ogikubo Line branch opens between Nakano-Fujimicho and Honancho.
- May 31, 1962 – The Hibiya Line opens between Kita-Senju and Minami-Senju, and between Naka-Okachimachi and Ningyocho; through service begins with the Tobu Isesaki Line to Kita-Koshigaya.
- August 29, 1964 – The Hibiya Line opens between Higashi-Ginza and Kasumigaseki, completing the full line between Kita-Senju and Naka-Meguro; through service begins with the Tokyu Toyoko Line, and Nishi-Ginza Station on the Marunouchi Line is renamed Ginza Station.
- December 23, 1964 – The Tozai Line opens between Takadanobaba and Kudanshita.
- October 1, 1966 – Mutual through service begins between the Tozai Line and the Chuo Line at Ogikubo.
- March 29, 1969 – The Tozai Line opens between Toyocho and Nishi-Funabashi, completing the section between Nakano and Nishi-Funabashi.
- April 8, 1969 – Through service begins between Mitaka on the Chūō Line, the Tōzai Line, and Tsudanuma on the Sōbu Line.
- December 20, 1969 – The Chiyoda Line opens between Kita-Senju and Otemachi, with the operating distance exceeding 100km.
- April 20, 1971 – The Chiyoda Line opens between Ayase and Kita-Senju; through service begins with the Jōban Line to Abiko.
- October 30, 1974 – The Yurakucho Line opens between Ikebukuro and Ginza-itchome.
- February 28, 1978 – A Tōzai Line train is derailed and overturned on the Arakawa and Nakagawa bridges due to a tornado.
- March 31, 1978 – The Chiyoda Line opens between Yoyogi-koen and Yoyogi-Uehara, completing the line between Ayase and Yoyogi-Uehara; direct service begins with the Odakyu Odawara Line to Hon-Atsugi.
- August 1, 1978 – The Hanzōmon Line opens between Shibuya and Aoyama-itchome; direct service begins with the Tokyu Shin-Tamagawa Line to Futako-Tamagawa-en.
- December 20, 1979 – The Chiyoda Line opens between Ayase and Kita-Ayase.
- August 25, 1987 – The Yurakucho Line opens between Wakoshi and Narimasu; through service begins with the Tobu Tojo Line in Kawagoe City.
- June 8, 1988 – The Yurakucho Line opens between Shintomicho and Shinkiba, completing the line between Wakoshi and Shinkiba.
- November 29, 1991 – The Namboku Line opens between Komagome and Akabane-Iwabuchi.
- April 27, 1996 – Mutual through service begins between the Tozai Line and the Toyo Rapid Line to Toyo-Katsutadai.
- March 26, 1998 – Direct service begins between the Yurakucho Line and the Seibu Ikebukuro Line to Hanno.
- September 26, 2000 – The Namboku Line opens between Meguro and Tameike-Sanno, completing the line between Meguro and Akabane-Iwabuchi; through service begins with the Tokyu Meguro Line to Musashi-Kosugi.
- March 28, 2001 – Mutual through service begins between the Namboku Line and the Saitama Rapid Railway to Urawa-Misono.
- March 19, 2003 – The Hanzōmon Line opens between Suitengumae and Oshiage, completing the line between Shibuya and Oshiage; through service begins with the Tobu Nikko Line to Minami-Kurihashi.
- March 15, 2008 – Romancecar and MSE direct services begin operating on the Chiyoda Line.
- June 14, 2008 – The Fukutoshin Line opens between Wakoshi and Shibuya.

== Lines ==
Altogether, the Tokyo Metro is made up of nine lines operating on 195.1 kilometers (121.2 mi) of route.

Tokyo Metro operates nine subway lines, each identified by a unique color code and letter symbol for easy navigation. These lines form the core of the network, spanning a total operating length of 195.0 km with 180 stations. Service on all lines runs daily from approximately 5:00 a.m. to midnight, with peak-hour headways of 2 to 5 minutes to accommodate high passenger volumes. The two oldest lines use 600 V DC third rail electrification, while the remaining seven employ 1,500 V DC overhead catenary for higher capacity and speed.

=== List of Tokyo Metro lines ===
	Tokyo Metro									
Line	Color	Icon	No. (Note: Line numbers are only used internally and are not listed on subway maps)	Route	Stations	Length km (mi)	Opened	Daily ridership (FY2024)	Gauge	Current supply
Ginza	Orange	Ginza Line	3	Shibuya to Asakusa	19	14.3 (8.9)	1927	1,974,806	1,435 mm (4 ft 8 1/2 in)	Third rail, 600 V DC
Marunouchi	Red	Marunouchi Line	4	Ogikubo to Ikebukuro	25	24.2 (15.0)	1954	2,520,940	1,435 mm (4 ft 8 1/2 in)	Third rail, 600 V DC
Marunouchi Branch	Red	Marunouchi Line	4	Nakano-Sakaue to Hōnanchō	4	3.2 (2.0)	1962	2,520,940	1,435 mm (4 ft 8 1/2 in)	Third rail, 600 V DC
Hibiya	Silver	Hibiya Line	2	Naka-Meguro to Kita-Senju	22	20.3 (12.6)	1961	2,268,322	1,067 mm (3 ft 6 in)	Overhead line, 1,500 V DC
Tōzai	Sky Blue	Tōzai Line (Tokyo Metro)	5	Nakano to Nishi-Funabashi	23	30.8 (19.1)	1964	2,609,114	1,067 mm (3 ft 6 in)	Overhead line, 1,500 V DC
Chiyoda	Green	Chiyoda Line	9	Yoyogi-Uehara to Ayase	20	24.0 (14.9)	1969	2,351,802	1,067 mm (3 ft 6 in)	Overhead line, 1,500 V DC
Chiyoda Branch	Green	Chiyoda Line	9	Ayase to Kita-Ayase	2	2.6 (1.6)	1979	2,351,802	1,067 mm (3 ft 6 in)	Overhead line, 1,500 V DC
Yūrakuchō	Gold	Yūrakuchō Line (Tokyo Metro)	8	Wakōshi to Shin-Kiba	24	28.3 (17.6)	1974	2,092,194	1,067 mm (3 ft 6 in)	Overhead line, 1,500 V DC
Toyosumi Line	Gold	TBA	8	Toyosu to Sumiyoshi (Phase I)	5	5.2 (3.2)	Mid-2030s (Under construction)	2,092,194	1,067 mm (3 ft 6 in)	Overhead line, 1,500 V DC
Hanzōmon	Purple	Hanzōmon Line	11	Shibuya to Oshiage	14	16.8 (10.4)	1978	1,945,116	1,067 mm (3 ft 6 in)	Overhead line, 1,500 V DC
Namboku	Emerald	Namboku Line (Tokyo Metro)	7	Meguro to Akabane-Iwabuchi	19	21.3 (13.2)	1991	1,036,470	1,067 mm (3 ft 6 in)	Overhead line, 1,500 V DC
Namboku Branch	Emerald	TBA	7	Shirokane-Takanawa to Shinagawa	2	2.5 (1.6)	Mid-2030s (Under construction)	1,036,470	1,067 mm (3 ft 6 in)	Overhead line, 1,500 V DC
Fukutoshin	Brown	Fukutoshin Line	13	Wakōshi to Shibuya	16	11.9 (7.4) (Note: Excluding the 8.3 kilometres (5.2 mi) stretch between Wakoshi and Kotake-mukaihara shared with Yurakucho Line.)	1994	1,111,014	1,067 mm (3 ft 6 in)	Overhead line, 1,500 V DC
Total (Subway only, not including trackage rights):					180	195.1 (121.2)				

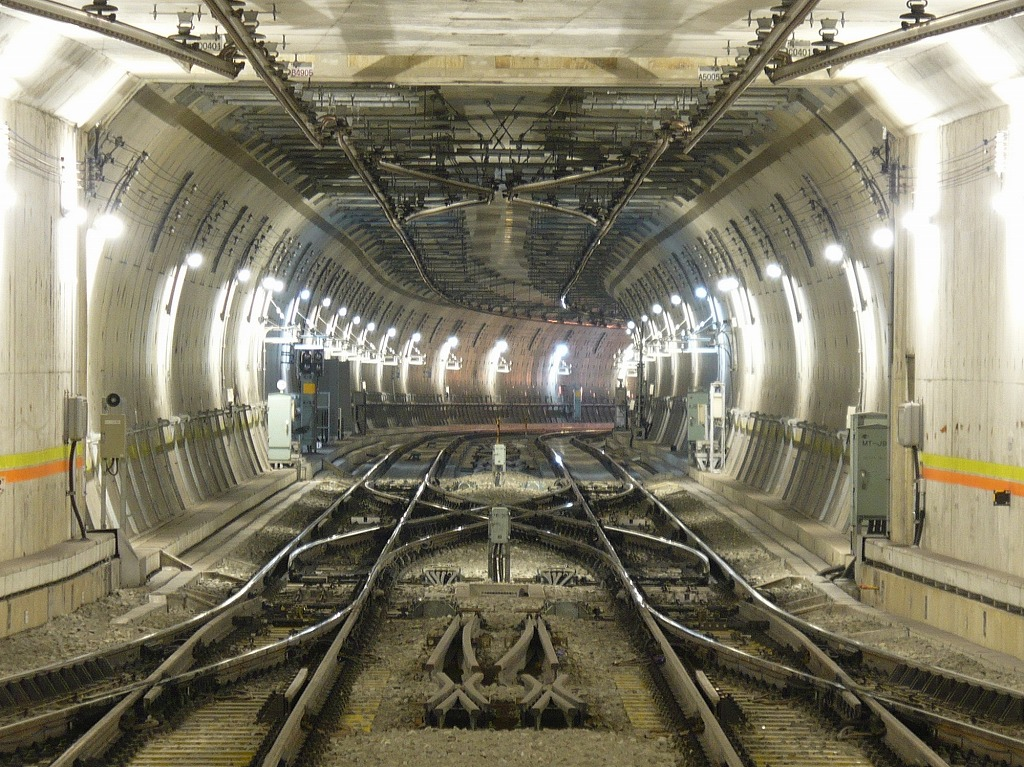
A shield tunnel heading toward Ikebukuro, viewed from the Shibuya Station platform.

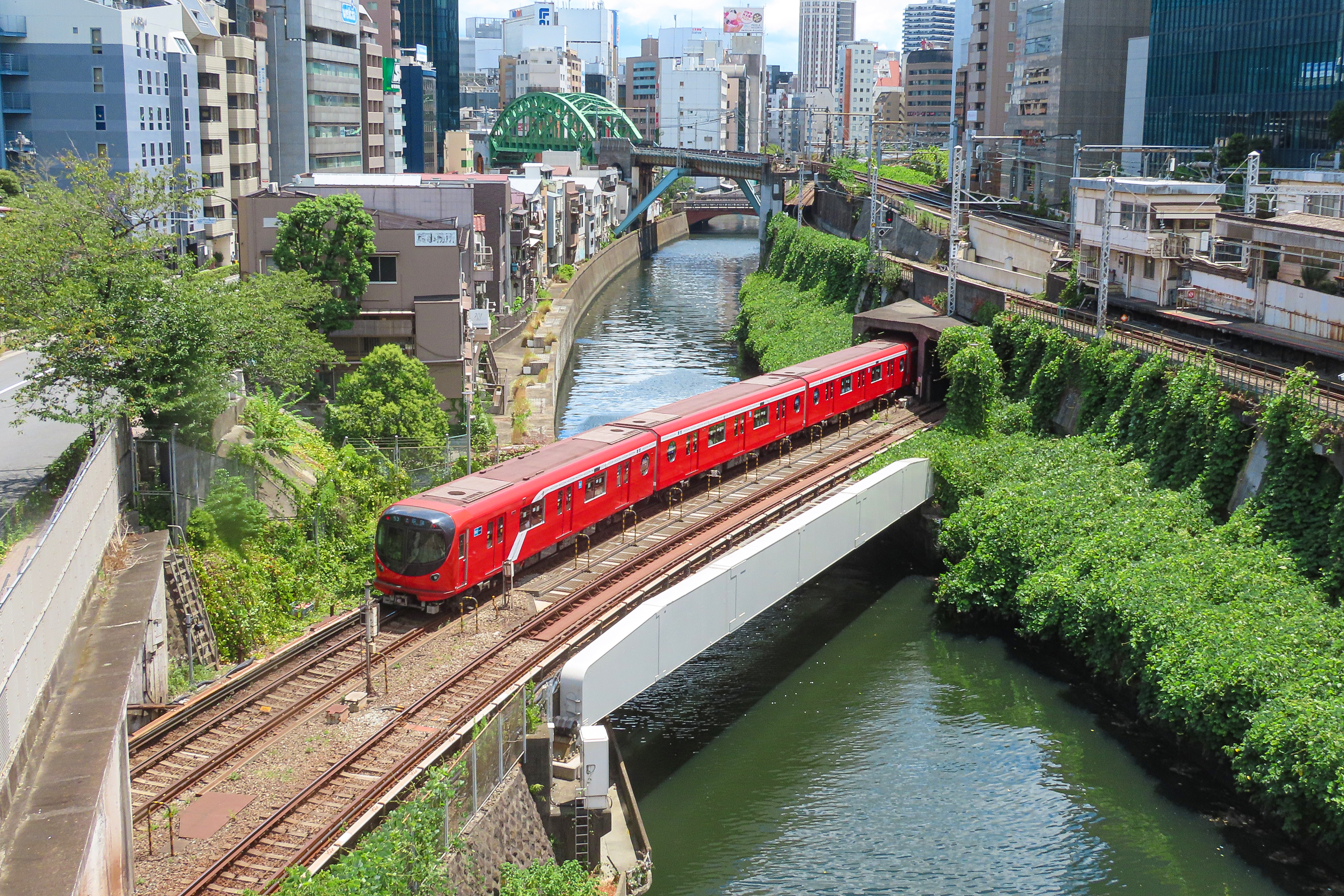
Marunouchi Line leaving Ochanomizu Station.

- The route numbers established in Urban Transportation Council Recommendation No. 10 (都市交通審議会答申第10号), submitted to the Minister of Transport on April 10, 1968, remain in use today. The recommendation did not designate specific construction or operating entities. As a result, other operators, including the Tokyo Metropolitan Bureau of Transportation and Tokyu Corporation, applied for licenses based on the recommendation, leading to the existence of route numbers not listed in the table above, including Lines 1, 6, 10, and 12. The route numbering system differed from that used in the earlier Urban Transportation Council Recommendation No. 6 (都市交通審議会答申第6号), submitted on June 8, 1962. Between Recommendations No. 6 and No. 10, several route numbers were reassigned: the Chiyoda Line was renumbered from Line 8 to Line 9, the Yurakucho Line from Line 10 to Line 8, and the Toei Shinjuku Line from Line 9 to Line 10.
- The section of the Chiyoda Line between Kita-Ayase Station and Ayase Station is treated as a branch line in some sources; however, for passenger information purposes it is regarded as part of a single line. This treatment is consistent across official materials, including the Tokyo Metro website and the Railway Directory (鉄道要覧).
- The section between Wakōshi Station and Kotake-Mukaihara Station is listed as part of the Yurakucho Line in the official website and in the Railway Directory. However, in the Tokyo Metropolitan Area Railway Network Development Plan and other planning documents, it is classified as part of Line 13 (the Fukutoshin Line). For passenger information purposes, this section is treated as a shared segment of both lines, with station numbering assigned separately for the Yurakucho Line and the Fukutoshin Line.
- When the Fukutoshin Line opened, the section between Kotake-Mukaihara Station and Ikebukuro Station was initially treated as a quadruple-track extension of the Yurakucho Line, known as the Yurakucho Line New Line. This section was subsequently incorporated into the Fukutoshin Line upon the opening of the line's southern section from Ikebukuro Station.

=== Through services to other lines ===
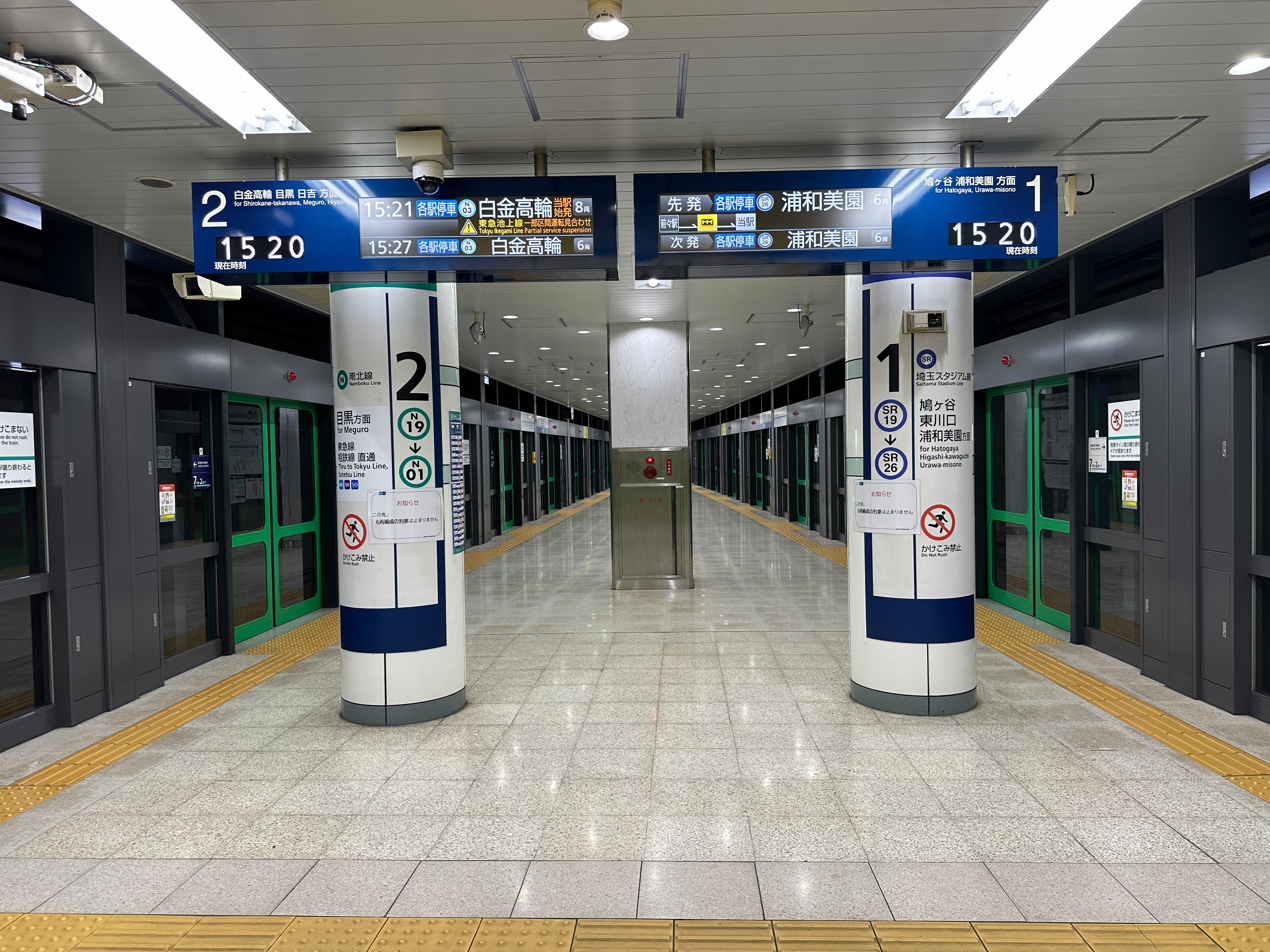
Shared platform at Akabane-Iwabuchi Station for the Saitama Rapid Railway Line and Namboku Line.

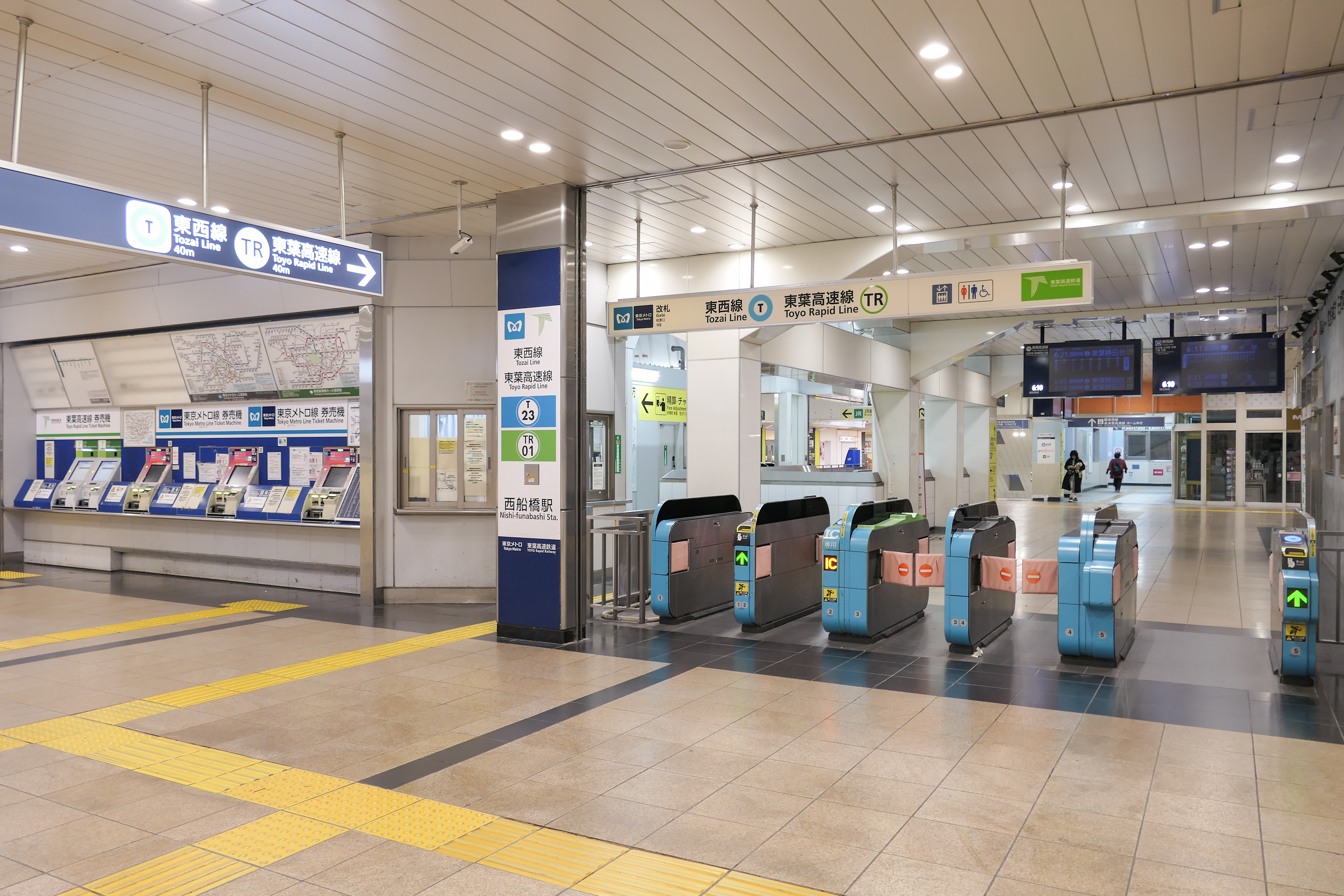
Ticket gates at Nishi-Funabashi Station for the Tokyo Metro Tōzai Line and the Tōyō Rapid Railway.

Through-running operations allow Tokyo Metro trains to continue beyond their own network and travel directly onto tracks owned by other railway companies. This arrangement enables passengers to ride seamlessly from suburban districts, through central Tokyo, and onward without the need to change trains. Such services are made possible through cooperative agreements among Tokyo Metro, East Japan Railway Company (JR East), the Tokyo Metropolitan Bureau of Transportation (Toei Subway), and several private railway operators, including Seibu Railway, Tobu Railway, and Tokyu Corporation.

One example is the Chiyoda Line, which runs northeast onto JR East’s Jōban Line as far as Ayase Station, providing a direct link between residential neighborhoods in northern Tokyo and Saitama Prefecture and the city’s major employment centers. The Tōzai Line similarly offers through services eastward onto the JR East Sōbu Line to Nishi-Funabashi in Chiba Prefecture, using 10-car train sets to handle heavy passenger volumes. On the western side, the Yūrakuchō Line extends onto the Seibu Ikebukuro Line, reaching Kotesashi Station and serving commuters from western Tokyo and Saitama.

The Hanzōmon Line also participates in through-running, continuing south onto Tokyu’s Den-en-toshi Line toward Chūō-Rinkan, which connects Shibuya with southern suburban areas and supports large residential developments such as Tama New Town. A particularly significant expansion of this practice occurred in March 2013, when the Fukutoshin Line began operating through services with the Seibu, Tobu, Tokyu Toyoko, and Yokohama Minatomirai lines, creating Japan’s first interconnection involving five separate railway companies.

These extensions enhance connectivity across Greater Tokyo's approximately 1,000 km of shared tracks involving 18 operators, reducing travel times, alleviating congestion at transfer stations, and promoting regional economic integration by enabling direct access to employment centers. Operationally, through services require compatible infrastructure, such as standardized 1,435 mm gauge tracks and voltage systems, with Tokyo Metro coordinating schedules to ensure seamless integration.

Line	Through Lines
Hibiya Line	Tobu Skytree Line; Tōbu Nikkō Line (Kita-Senju to Minami-Kurihashi and Tōbu-Dōbutsu-Kōen)
Tōzai Line	JR East Chūō-Sōbu Line (Chūō Main Line) (Nakano to Mitaka)
Tōzai Line	JR East Chūō-Sōbu Line (Sōbu Main Line) (Nishi-Funabashi to Tsudanuma); Toyo Rapid Line (Nishi-Funabashi to Tōyō-Katsutadai)
Chiyoda Line	Odakyu Odawara Line; Odakyu Tama Line (Yoyogi-Uehara to Karakida and Isehara)
Chiyoda Line	JR East Jōban Line (Ayase to Toride)
Yūrakuchō Line	Tōbu Tōjō Line (Wakōshi to Ogawamachi); Seibu Ikebukuro Line via Seibu Yūrakuchō Line (Kotake-Mukaihara Station to Hannō)
Hanzōmon Line	Tōkyū Den-en-toshi Line (Shibuya to Chūō-Rinkan)
Hanzōmon Line	Tobu Skytree Line; Tobu Nikkō Line; Tobu Isesaki Line (Oshiage to Tōbu-Dōbutsu-Kōen, Minami-Kurihashi and Kuki)
Namboku Line	Saitama Rapid Railway Line (Akabane-Iwabuchi to Urawa-Misono)
Namboku Line	Tōkyū Meguro Line (Meguro to Hiyoshi), then Tōkyū Shin-Yokohama Line (Hiyoshi to Shin-Yokohama), then Sōtetsu Shin-Yokohama Line (Shin-Yokohama to Nishiya), then Sōtetsu Main Line (Nishiya to Futamata-gawa to Ebina) or Sōtetsu Izumino Line (Futamata-gawa to Shōnandai)
Fukutoshin Line	Tōbu and Seibu line (same stations served as the Yūrakuchō Line)
Fukutoshin Line	Tōkyū Tōyoko Line (Shibuya to Hiyoshi and Yokohama); Minatomirai Line (Yokohama to Motomachi-Chūkagai) Or Tōkyū Shin-Yokohama Line (Hiyoshi to Shin-Yokohama), then Sōtetsu Shin-Yokohama Line (Shin-Yokohama to Nishiya), then Sōtetsu Main Line (Nishiya to Futamata-gawa to Ebina) or Sōtetsu Izumino Line (Futamata-gawa to Shōnandai)

- Namboku Line shares 2.3 km (1.4 mi) of track of between Meguro and Shirokane-Takanawa with Toei Mita Line.
- Some of the Tōkyū Tōyoko Line express trains, instead of continuing towards Yokohama/Motomachi-Chūkagai, change course at Hiyoshi for Tōkyū Shin-Yokohama Line and share all of the through services downstream just as Tōkyū Meguro Line.

== Stations ==
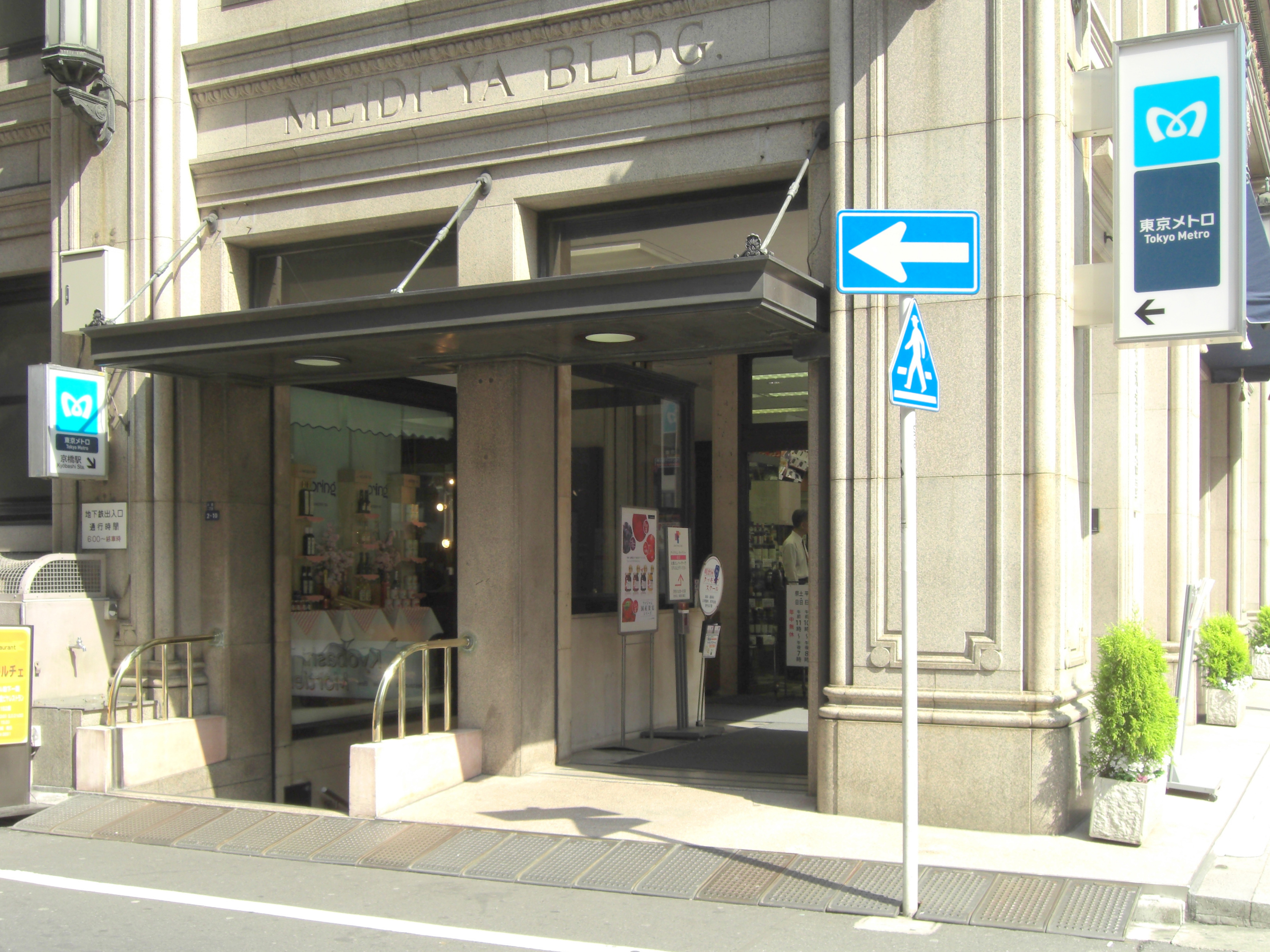
Entrance to Kyōbashi Station directly connected to the Meidi-Ya Building.

There are a total of 180 unique stations (i.e., counting stations served by multiple lines only once) on the Tokyo Metro network. Most stations are located within the 23 special wards and fall inside the Yamanote Line rail loop — some wards such as Setagaya and Ōta have no stations (or only a limited number of stations), as rail service in these areas has historically been provided by the Toei Subway or any of the various major private railways (大手私鉄).

Most stations are built at depths of approximately 20 to 30 meters below ground level; the Fukutoshin Line, in particular, averages a depth of about 27 meters in order to pass beneath existing railway and utility infrastructure. Escalators are installed at over 90% of stations, while elevators and related facilities are provided in accordance with Japan’s Barrier-Free Transportation Law, enabling step-free access between street level and platforms at most locations.

Several major interchange stations illustrate the network’s role in metropolitan connectivity. Shinjuku Station, where the Marunouchi and Fukutoshin lines connect with JR East and other railway operators, handles a combined daily passenger volume exceeding 3.6 million. Ikebukuro Station functions as another major hub, served by the Marunouchi, Yurakucho, and Fukutoshin lines, with extensive connections to JR and private railways used by millions of commuters. Shibuya Station, a key transfer point for the Ginza, Hanzomon, and Fukutoshin lines as well as Tokyu and JR services, accommodates roughly 3 million users per day across all rail operators. At Tokyo Station, the Marunouchi Line provides direct connections to JR lines, supporting heavy transfer demand within the central business district. Together, these interchange stations demonstrate the high degree of integration among Tokyo Metro’s nine lines and their role in facilitating passenger movement across the metropolitan area.

Station safety measures include the installation of platform screen doors, which had been completed at approximately 88% of stations by fiscal year 2022, with full network coverage planned by 2025 to reduce accidents and prevent suicides. In addition, multilingual guidance—provided in English, Chinese, and Korean—is displayed on platforms, ticket machines, and through onboard and station announcements to assist both international visitors and residents.

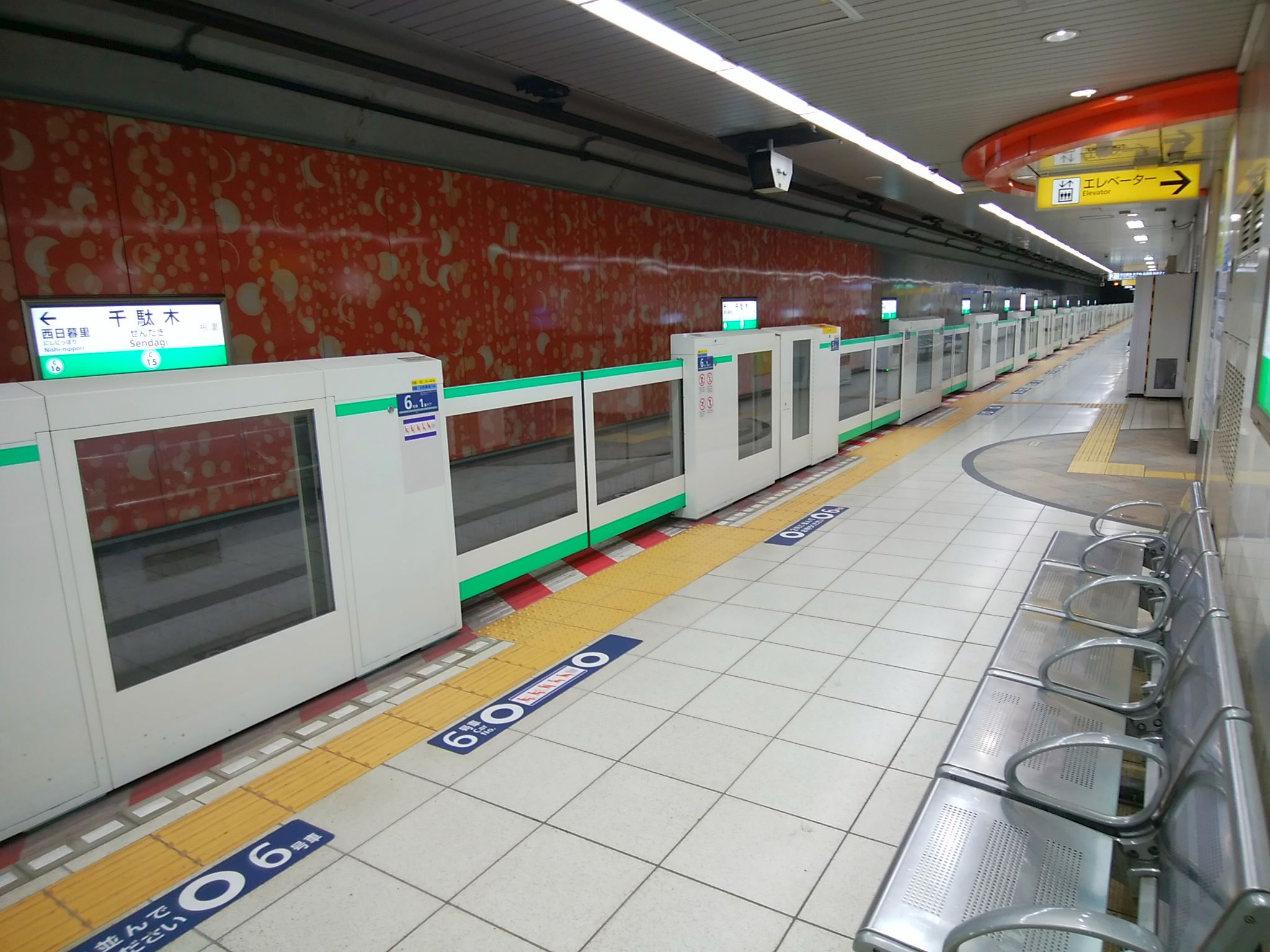
Typical Tokyo Metro station, with half-height platform doors, at the Sendagi Station.

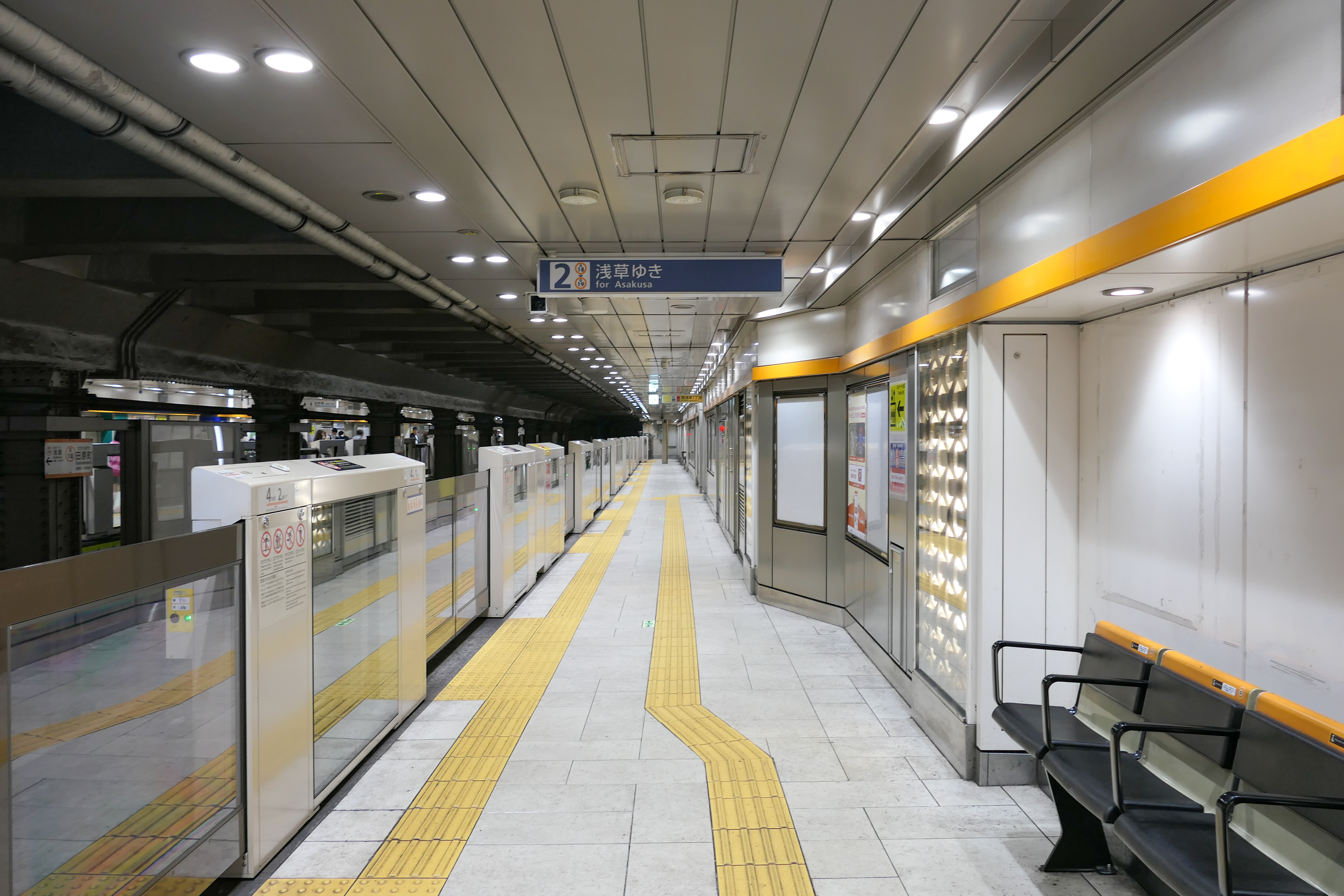
Platform at Tawaramachi Station, one of the Tokyo Metro’s oldest stations.

Tokyo Metro’s accessibility efforts are aligned with national barrier-free policies, with most stations equipped with elevators, ramps, and step-free routes connecting entrances and platforms. The operator aims to achieve full wheelchair accessibility throughout the network by 2025 as part of its mid-term management strategy. Priority seating is available in every train car, and women-only cars are operated on all lines during weekday peak periods (7:30–9:30 a.m. and 5:30–7:00 p.m.), clearly identified by pink signage to improve comfort and safety for female passengers.

Among notable features of the system, Kokkai-gijidōmae Station on the Chiyoda Line is the deepest station on the Tokyo Metro network, situated at a depth of approximately 37.9 meters, highlighting the technical challenges of subway construction in central Tokyo. Meanwhile, older stations such as Ueno, served by the Ginza and Hibiya Lines, retain architectural elements from the 1920s and 1930s, including original entrances associated with the opening of Japan’s first subway line in 1927.

Major interchange stations, connecting three or more Tokyo Metro lines, include the following:

- Ginza
- Iidabashi
- Ikebukuro
- Kasumigaseki
- Kokkai-gijidō-mae / Tameike-sannō
- Nagatachō / Akasaka-mitsuke
- Omotesandō
- Ōtemachi
- Shibuya

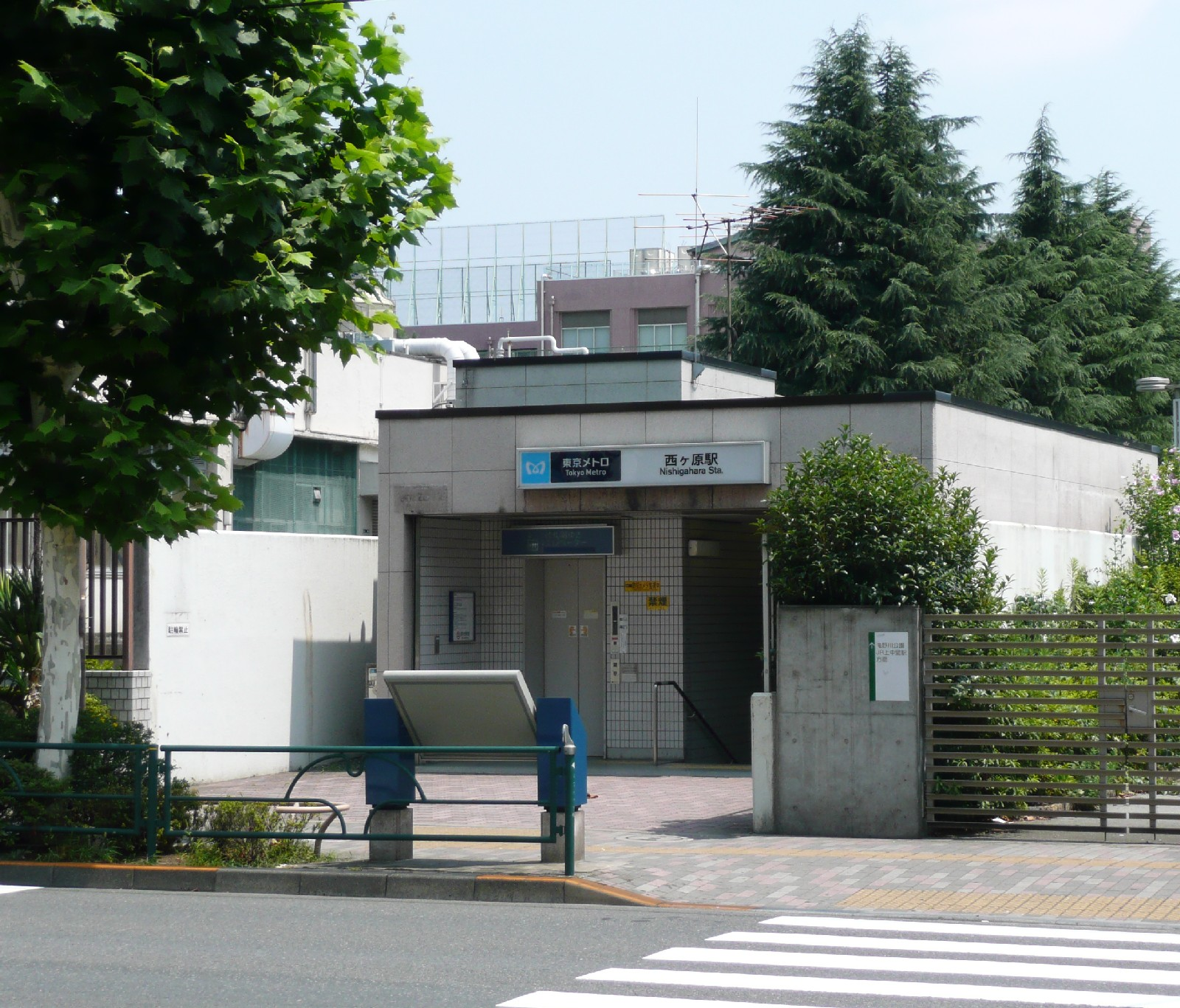
Nishigahara Station, among the Tokyo Metro stations with the lowest daily ridership.

Other major stations provide additional connections to other railway operators such as the Toei Subway, JR East, and the various private railways, including (but not limited to) the following:

- Hibiya
- Kita-Senju
- Kudanshita
- Shimbashi
- Shinjuku
- Shinjuku-sanchōme
- Ueno
- Yotsuya

== Operation ==
=== Fares ===
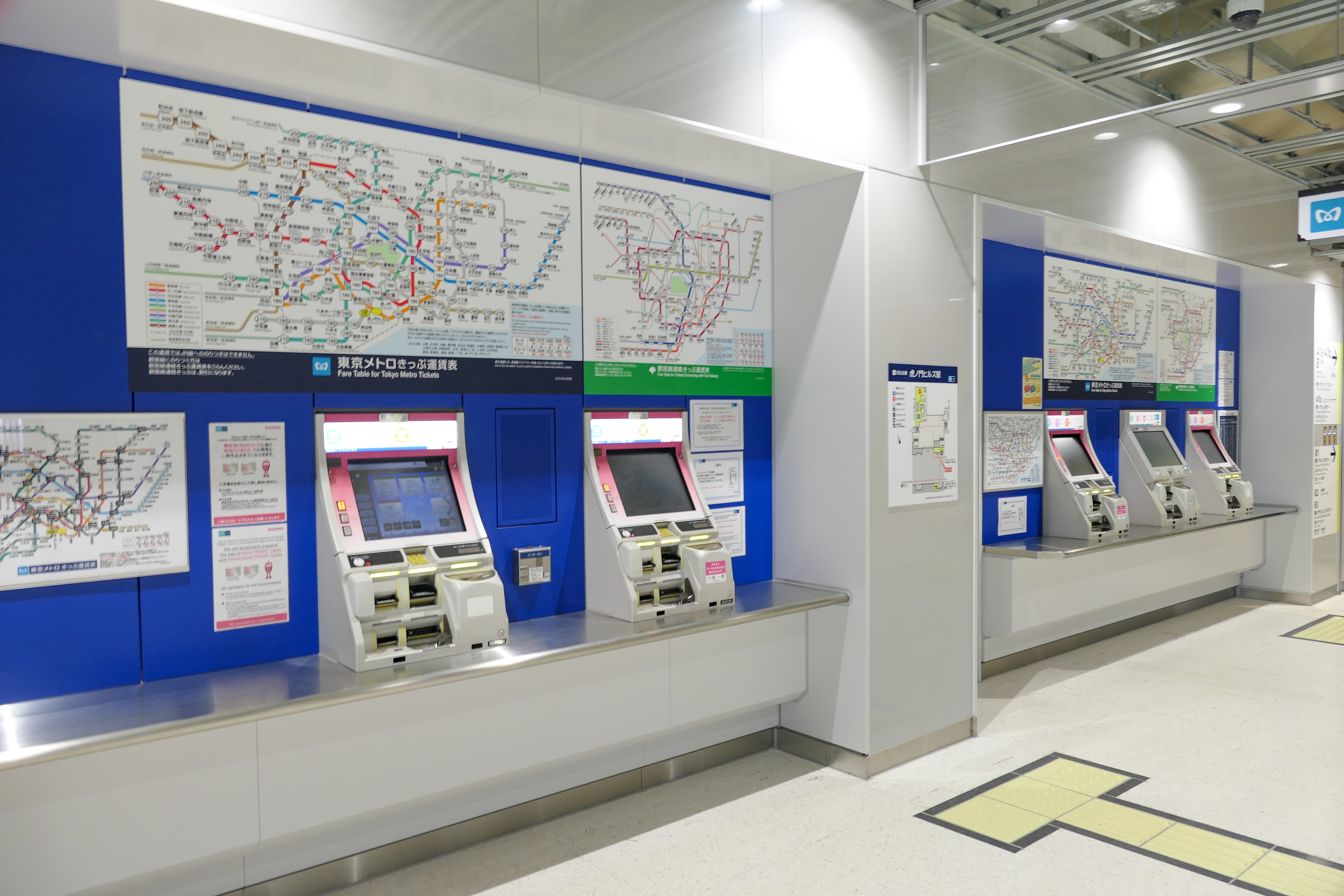
Ticket vending machine at Toranomon Hills Station.

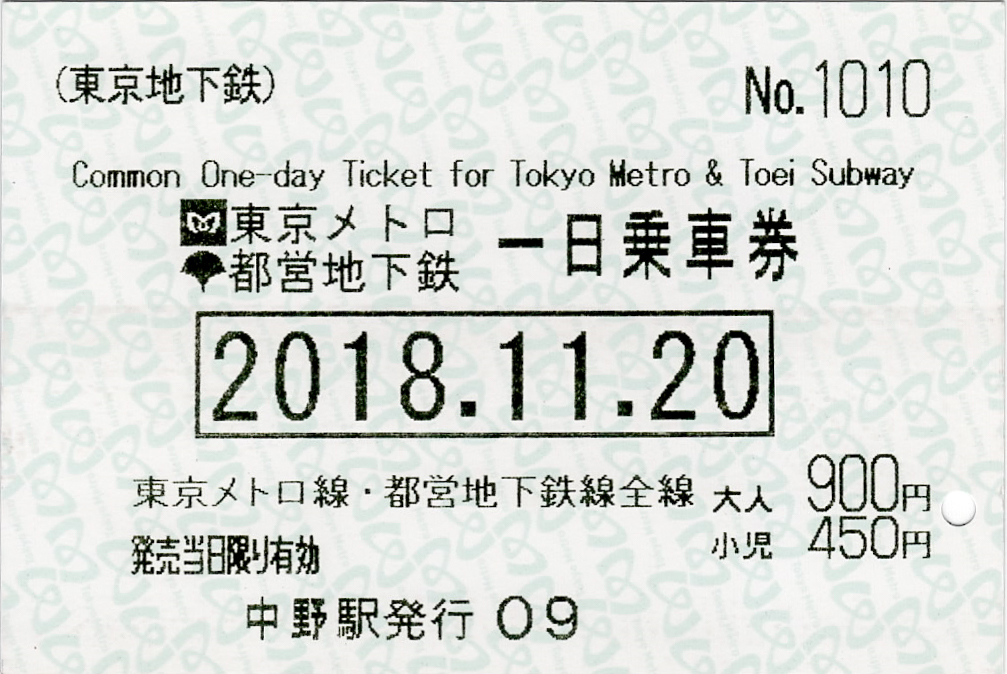
One day (24 hours) ticket for Tokyo Metro and Toei Subway

Tokyo Metro uses a distance-based fare system. When paying with IC cards such as PASMO or Suica, adult fares range from ¥178 to ¥324, while fares for paper tickets are slightly higher, ranging from ¥180 to ¥330. Fare levels are determined by distance traveled, calculated in set kilometer brackets. Discounted fares apply to children aged 6 to 11, who are charged approximately half the adult fare, rounded down to the nearest whole yen. IC card payments are deducted in 1-yen increments, whereas paper tickets are sold in fixed denominations and include a ¥10 barrier-free surcharge. PASMO and Suica cards are accepted throughout the Tokyo Metro network, enabling contactless entry and exit at all ticket gates.

In addition, passengers transferring between Tokyo Metro and Toei Subway services at designated interchange stations within a 120-minute window receive a ¥70 transfer discount, which lowers the combined fare. For example, a journey costing ¥252 on Tokyo Metro and ¥220 on the Toei Subway is reduced to a total of ¥402 rather than ¥472. The same proportional transfer discount applies to child fares.

For visitors, the Tokyo Subway Ticket provides unlimited travel on all Tokyo Metro and Toei Subway lines for fixed periods of 24 hours (¥800 for adults; ¥400 for children), 48 hours (¥1,200 / ¥600), or 72 hours (¥1,500 / ¥750). Validity begins at the time of first use, and tickets may be purchased in advance. As of 2025, standard Tokyo Metro fares have remained unchanged; however, JR East announced an average fare increase of 7.1% on its lines, including the Yamanote Line, effective from March 2026, with short-distance fares rising by ¥10 (for example, from ¥150 to ¥160). Tickets and passes are available through multilingual ticket vending machines at all stations, as well as via mobile applications such as Mobile PASMO and Mobile Suica, which support IC card issuance and balance recharging. Certain products can also be purchased at Metro Pass Offices. Discounted fares are offered for organized groups consisting of eight or more passengers (or nine or more in the case of student groups), providing reductions of approximately 17–30% when arrangements are made in advance at a station office. Larger groups may also receive complimentary tickets, typically at a rate of one free ticket for every 25 to 50 paying passengers.

=== Overcrowding ===
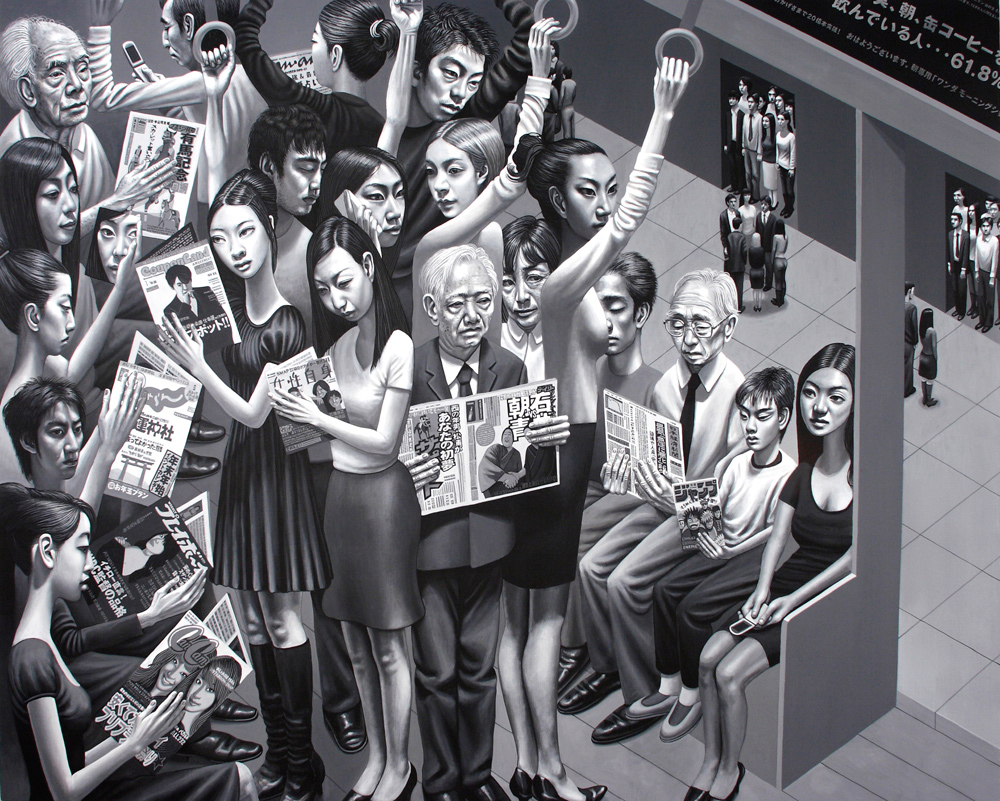
Figurative art by British artist Carl Randall depicting a crowded train in Tokyo.

Overcrowding is a persistent issue on the Tokyo Metro, particularly during weekday peak commuting hours, due to the high population density of the Tokyo metropolitan area and the concentration of employment and educational institutions in central Tokyo. Tokyo Metro, which serves millions of passengers daily, routinely experiences passenger loads well above its designed capacity on several lines.

Congestion rates in Japan are measured as the ratio of passenger load to designed capacity, with 100% representing full occupancy where all passengers can sit or stand while holding onto a strap or handrail. Higher percentages indicate increasingly crowded conditions. Sustained congestion rates above 150% are typical during rush hours on many Tokyo Metro lines, with some segments historically reaching extreme levels. The Tokyo Metro Tōzai Line has long been notorious for overcrowding, with pre-pandemic surveys recording peak congestion rates approaching 199%, indicating conditions where passengers are pressed tightly together with limited mobility. Other busy lines such as the Hibiya Line also frequently exceed 150% capacity during morning peak periods.

According to government data, sections of the Tokyo Metro network remain among the most crowded in the Tokyo area. For example, the section of the Hibiya Line between Minowa and Iriya stations was measured at approximately 163% congestion during morning rush hours in a 2024 survey. In the broader Tokyo metropolitan rail network—of which Tokyo Metro is a major part—average congestion rates across key commuter sections hovered around 136% in 2023, nearing levels typical before the COVID-19 pandemic as ridership recovered.

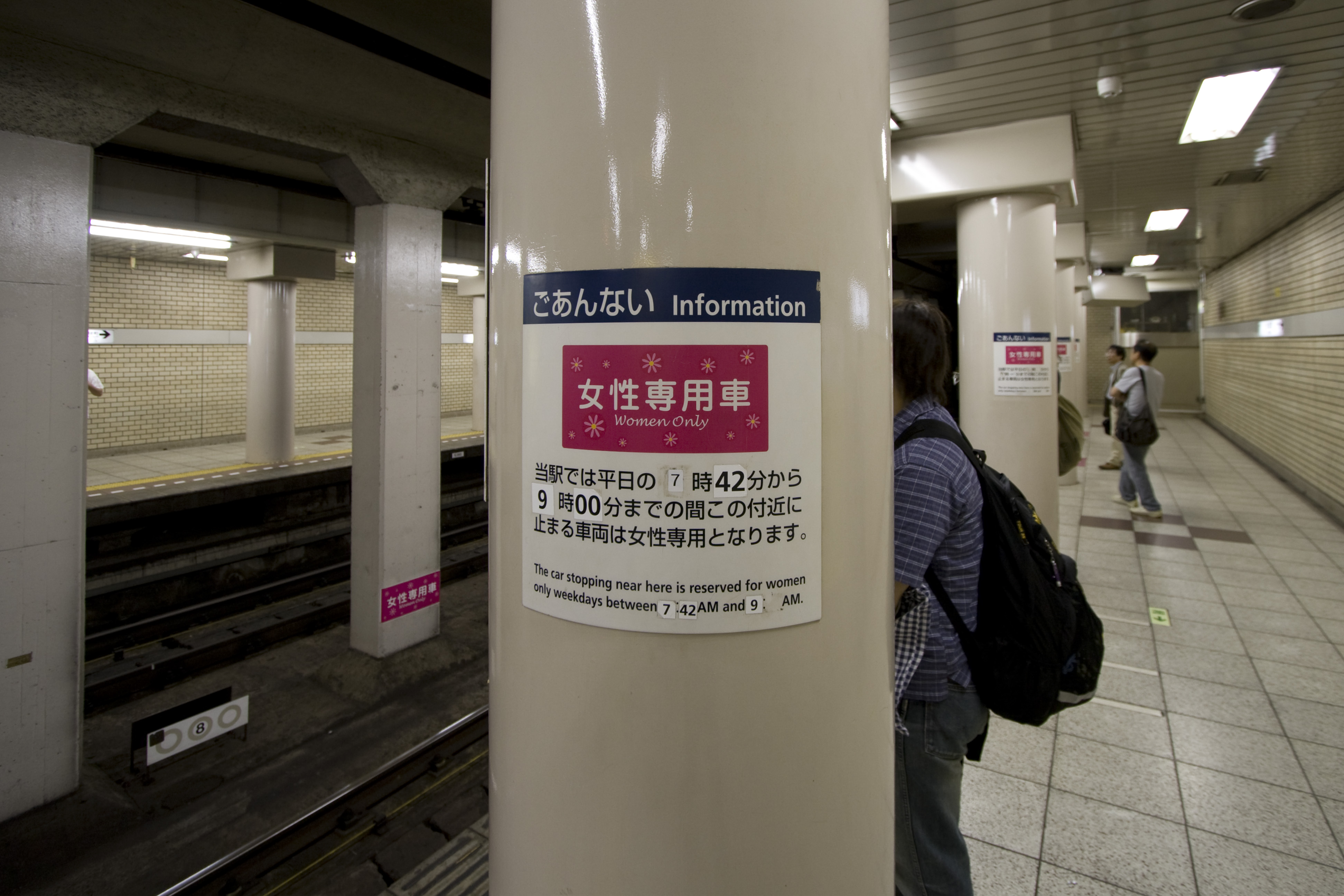
A sign on the Hibiya Line denoting that cars stopping in this area are for women only during morning peak hours

To mitigate overcrowding, Tokyo Metro has implemented measures such as increasing service frequency during peak hours, introducing women-only cars, installing platform screen doors, deploying station staff to manage passenger flow, and promoting off-peak travel through demand-management initiatives.

=== Traffic ===
According to the company, an average of 6.33 million people used the company's nine subway routes each day in 2009. The company made a profit of ¥63.5 billion in 2009.

In fiscal year 2024 (April 2023–March 2024), Tokyo Metro averaged approximately 6.84 million passenger trips per day, representing a year-on-year increase of about 5% from the 6.52 million daily average recorded in FY2023. This rise in usage resulted in a total annual ridership of roughly 2.5 billion journeys across the network.

Passenger numbers continued to recover following the COVID-19 pandemic, reaching around 95% of pre-pandemic (FY2019) levels by early 2025. This rebound has been attributed largely to the return of regular office commuting as well as increased leisure travel. Peak usage occurs during the morning rush period between 7:00 and 9:00 a.m., which accounts for approximately 40% of total daily ridership, underscoring the system’s importance to Tokyo’s commuter population. By line, the Tōzai Line carries the largest volume of passengers, with about 1.2 million daily users, whereas the Ginza Line records the lowest usage at roughly 0.6 million per day.

Operational reliability remains high, with on-time performance reported at 99.8% and mean delays averaging under one minute per train. Ridership by overseas visitors has increased, partly due to external factors such as the surge in tourism in 2025, when inbound arrivals to Japan surpassed 31 million during the first nine months of the year; this contributed to an estimated 10% rise in foreign passenger usage. Despite this growth, congestion levels on heavily used sections during peak hours averaged around 139%, indicating continued capacity constraints.

According to official forecasts published in the FY2025 Fact Book, average daily ridership is expected to reach approximately 7 million passengers by 2027, driven by planned network expansions and a continuing economic recovery.

== Ridership ==
Source: Tokyo Metropolitan Government

Daily ridership (Excluding transfers)
Year	Ridership	Ref.
1956	457,013	(Note: 1956)
1957	524,511	(Note: 1957)
1958	600,341	(Note: 1958)
1959	827,718	(Note: 1959)
1960	979,846	(Note: 1960)
1961	1,245,982	(Note: 1961)
1962	1,547,446	(Note: 1962)
1963	1,461,214	(Note: 1963)
1964	1,701,558	(Note: 1964)
1965	1,906,132	(Note: 1965)
1966	1,979,934	(Note: 1966)
1967	2,219,529	(Note: 1967)
1968	3,058,091	(Note: 1968)
1969	3,561,385	(Note: 1969)
1970	3,806,912	(Note: 1970)
1971	4,278,830	(Note: 1971)
1972	4,436,170	(Note: 1972)
1973	4,425,871	(Note: 1973)
1974	3,641,064	(Note: 1974)
1975	3,734,068	(Note: 1975)
1976	3,932,035	(Note: 1976)
1977	4,054,896	(Note: 1977)
1978	3,998,574	(Note: 1978)
1979	4,062,899	(Note: 1979)
1980	4,224,853	(Note: 1980)
1981	4,380,416	(Note: 1981)
1982	4,452,483	(Note: 1982)
1983	4,633,323	(Note: 1983)
1984	4,804,827	(Note: 1984)
1985	4,885,751	(Note: 1985)
1986	5,040,125	(Note: 1986)
1987	5,144,757	(Note: 1987)
1988	5,319,506	(Note: 1988)
1989	5,493,034	(Note: 1989)
1990	5,592,876	(Note: 1990)
1991	5,635,014	(Note: 1991)
1992	5,649,974	(Note: 1992)
1993	5,593,347	(Note: 1993)
1994	5,520,836	(Note: 1994)
1995	5,460,895	(Note: 1995)
1996	5,467,479	(Note: 1996)
1997	5,432,653	(Note: 1997)
1998	5,427,824	(Note: 1998)
1999	5,313,344	(Note: 1999)
2000	5,305,620	(Note: 2000)
2001	5,334,111	(Note: 2001)
2002	5,300,999	(Note: 2002)
2003	5,392,048	(Note: 2003)
2004	5,400,271	(Note: 2004)
2005	5,471,819	(Note: 2005)
2006	5,607,442	(Note: 2006)
2007	5,918,560	(Note: 2007)
2008	6,028,076	(Note: 2008)
2009	5,990,768	(Note: 2009)
2010	5,968,146	(Note: 2010)
2011	5,905,934	(Note: 2011)
2012	6,096,285	(Note: 2012)
2013	6,375,714	(Note: 2013)
2014	6,483,208	(Note: 2014)
2015	6,723,884	(Note: 2015)
2016	6,869,420	(Note: 2016)
2017	7,046,359	(Note: 2017)
2018	7,197,272	(Note: 2018)
2019	7,195,567	(Note: 2019)
2020	4,695,867	(Note: 2020)
2021	4,925,240	(Note: 2021)
2022	5,630,439	(Note: 2022)
2023	6,191,917	(Note: 2023)
2024	6,474,233	(Note: 2024)

== Infrastructure and maintenance ==
=== Depots ===
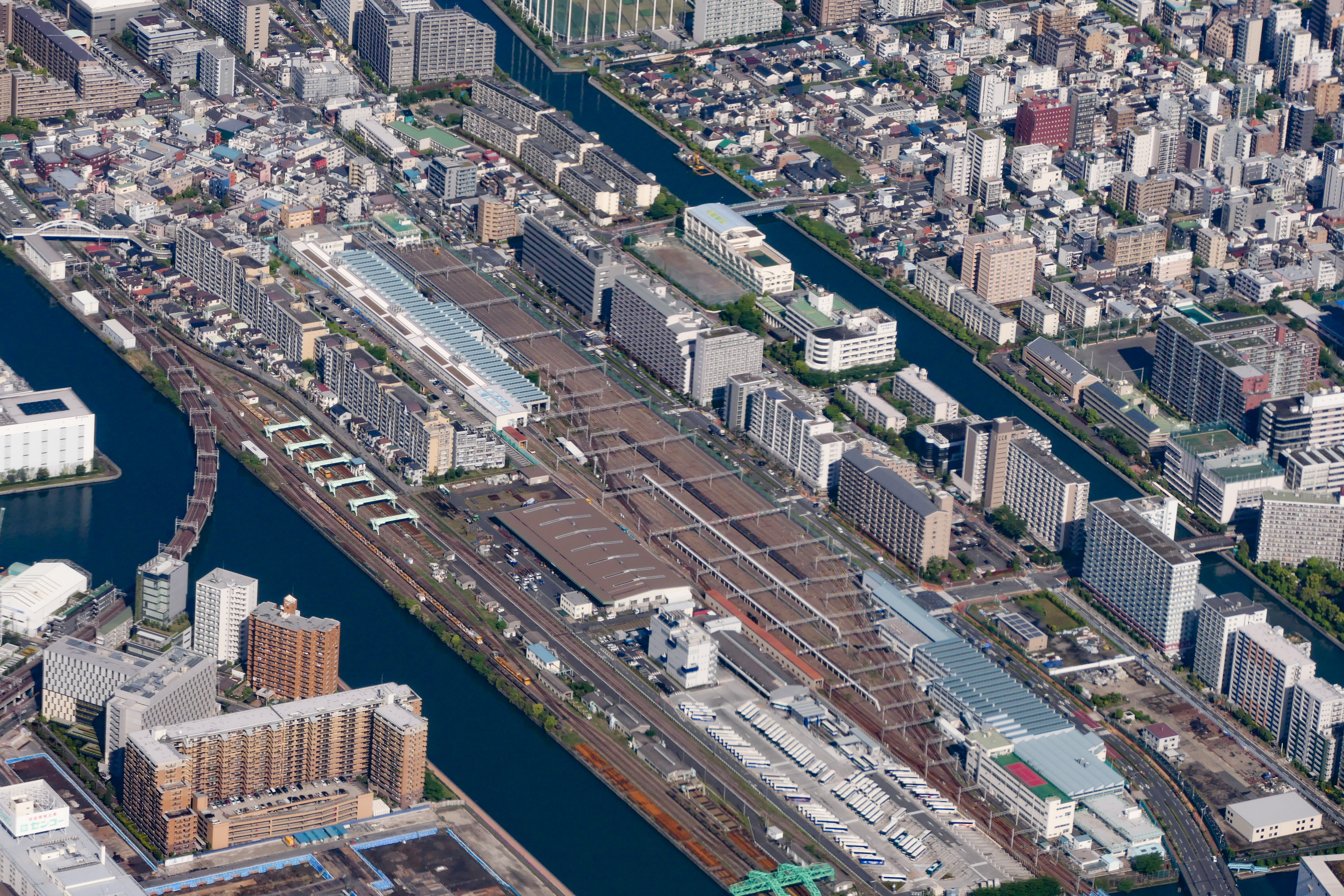
Fukagawa depot in Koto.

Tokyo Metro maintains nine principal depots and rail yards throughout its network, which are essential to sustaining efficient daily operations. Approximately 80% of the rolling stock is stabled overnight at these facilities, allowing for rapid deployment during the morning peak. Major maintenance work, including wheel reprofiling and full-scale inspections conducted at intervals of roughly 100,000 kilometers is concentrated at these sites to meet strict safety and regulatory requirements.

These depots are positioned strategically near line termini or central sections to maximize operational accessibility. Ueno Depot, located in Taitō Ward, mainly supports the Ginza and Marunouchi Lines and is responsible for routine inspections and minor repairs. Ayase Depot in Adachi Ward, the largest facility at 14.18 hectares, serves the Chiyoda Line and contains specialized inspection areas and workshops for extensive maintenance. Nakano Depot, occupying 5.9 hectares in Nakano Ward, handles stabling and scheduled maintenance for the Tōzai Line. Shibuya Depot, situated in Shibuya Ward, services the Hanzomon and Yūrakuchō Lines, with an emphasis on rapid turnaround operations. Other facilities include Koishikawa Depot for the Marunouchi Line, Otsuka Depot for the Namboku Line, Toride Depot for training-related functions, Kasai Depot supporting the Fukutoshin and Namboku Lines, and Shin-Kiba Depot, which functions as a shared inspection center for multiple lines.

Name	Location	Current assigned fleet	Former assigned fleet	Lines served
Ueno	Taitō, north of Ueno Station	1000	01, (old) 2000, 1500, 1400, 1300, 100, 1200, 1100, (old) 1000	Ginza
Shibuya	Shibuya, west of Shibuya Station	None (inspections only)		Ginza
Nakano	Nakano, south of Nakano-Fujimichō Station	2000	02, 02-80 (branch line), 300, 400, 500, 100 (branch line), (old) 2000 (branch line)	Marunouchi
Koishikawa	Bunkyō, between Myōgadani Station and Kōrakuen Station	None (inspection and renovation only)		Ginza, Marunouchi
Senju	Arakawa, north of Minami-Senju Station	13000	03, 3000	Hibiya
Takenotsuka	Adachi, south of Takenotsuka Station	13000	03, 3000	Hibiya
Fukagawa	Kōtō, south of Tōyōchō Station	05, 07, 15000	5000	Tōzai
Gyōtoku	Ichikawa, south of Myōden Station	None (inspections only)		Tōzai
Ayase	Adachi, north of Kita-Ayase Station	16000, 05 (branch line)	6000, 06, 5000 (branch line)	Chiyoda, Namboku, Yūrakuchō, Saitama Rapid
Wakō	Wakō, north of Wakōshi Station	10000, 17000	07, 7000	Fukutoshin, Yūrakuchō
Shin-Kiba	Kōtō, southeast of Shin-Kiba Station	None (inspection and renovation only)		Chiyoda, Hanzōmon, Namboku, Tōzai, Yūrakuchō, and Fukutoshin
Saginuma	Kawasaki, inside Saginuma Station	08, 8000, 18000		Hanzōmon
Ōji	Kita, north of Ōji-Kamiya Station	9000		Namboku

=== Rolling stock ===
Tokyo Metro’s rolling stock is organized according to the two different electrification systems used on its network. The Ginza and Marunouchi lines operate on a 600 V DC third-rail system and use 1,435 mm standard-gauge track, while the remaining lines, the Hibiya, Chiyoda, Tōzai, Yūrakuchō, Hanzōmon, Namboku, and Fukutoshin lines, employ a 1,500 V DC overhead catenary system on 1,067 mm Cape-gauge track.

The third-rail network accounts for roughly 740 railcars as of March 2019, all assigned to services on the Ginza and Marunouchi lines. On the Ginza Line, trains of the 1000 series operate in six-car sets, each capable of carrying approximately 720 passengers. This series entered service in 1993 and was designed to improve operating efficiency on the line, which is the oldest subway route in Asia. The Marunouchi Line is served by the 2000 series, also formed into six-car sets, which were introduced from 1996 onward with an emphasis on accessibility, incorporating universal design features intended to better accommodate elderly and disabled passengers. As of 1 April 2016, Tokyo Metro operates a fleet of 2,728 electric multiple unit (EMU) vehicles, the largest fleet for a private railway operator in Japan.

As of fiscal year 2024, Tokyo Metro’s fleet comprises 2,708 electric multiple-unit (EMU) cars, all equipped with automatic train control (ATC) and automatic train operation (ATO) systems to enhance operational safety and efficiency. In October 2025, the company transferred decommissioned rolling stock components, including bogies and traction motors formerly used on the Hanzōmon Line’s 8000 series, to the Far Eastern Air Transport and Technical Institute in the Philippines as part of its international technical cooperation activities.

==== 600 V third rail / 1,435 mm gauge lines ====
- 1000 series – Ginza Line
- 2000 series – Marunouchi Line

==== 1,500 V overhead / 1,067 mm gauge lines ====
- 05 series – Tōzai Line, Chiyoda Line
- 07 series – Tōzai Line
- 08 series – Hanzōmon Line
- 8000 series – Hanzōmon Line
- 9000 series – Namboku Line
- 10000 series – Yūrakuchō Line, Fukutoshin Line
- 13000 series – Hibiya Line
- 15000 series – Tōzai Line
- 16000 series – Chiyoda Line
- 17000 series – Yūrakuchō Line, Fukutoshin Line
- 18000 series – Hanzōmon Line

The majority of Tokyo Metro’s rolling stock operates under a 1,500 V DC overhead electrification system, with approximately 1,968 vehicles in service as of March 2019 on the Hibiya, Chiyoda, Tōzai, Yūrakuchō, Hanzōmon, Namboku, and Fukutoshin lines. The Tōzai Line is served by the 05 and 15000 series, which run in 10-car formations designed for high-capacity operations and can accommodate up to about 1,500 passengers per train. These sets were introduced from 1988 onward to support intensive through-service operations. The Chiyoda Line primarily uses the 16000 series, also formed into 10-car trains.

On the Yūrakuchō Line, 10-car sets of the 10000 series have been in operation since 2008, facilitating interline services with the Seibu and Tōbu railway networks. The Hanzōmon Line is operated by the 08 series, introduced in 1993 and configured as eight-car trains to ensure compatibility with Tokyu Corporation’s Den-en-toshi Line. The Namboku Line’s 9000 series has been undergoing refurbishment and conversion to the 9000-5000 subseries from 2025, with performance improvements such as enhanced acceleration to better suit the line’s operating characteristics.

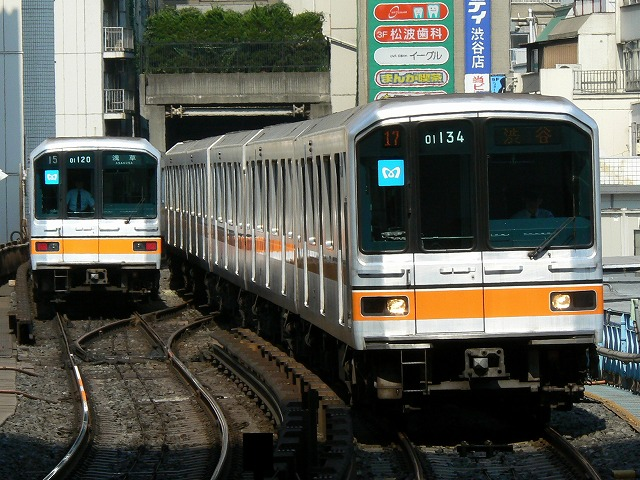
Ginza Line 01 series

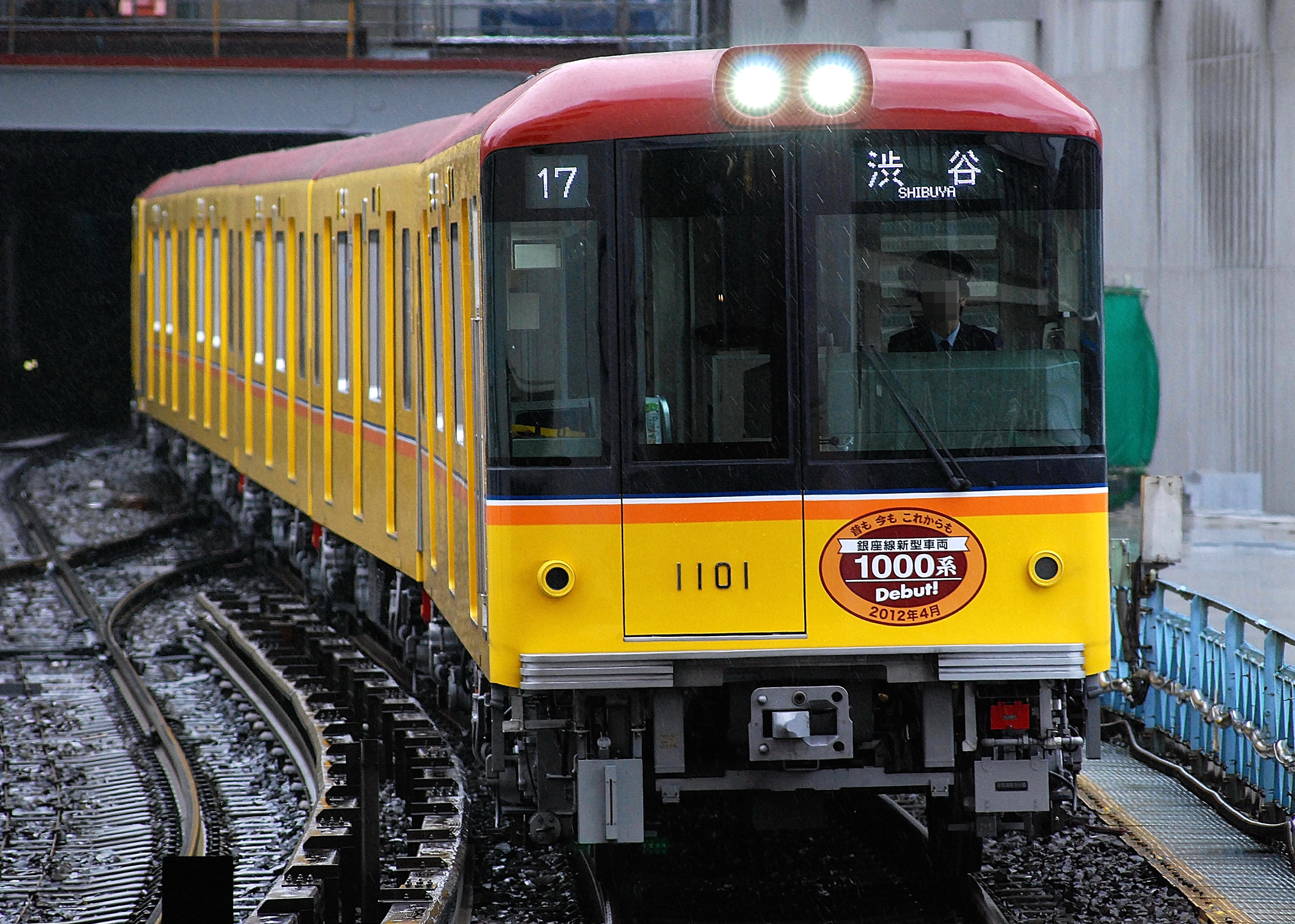
Ginza Line 1000 series

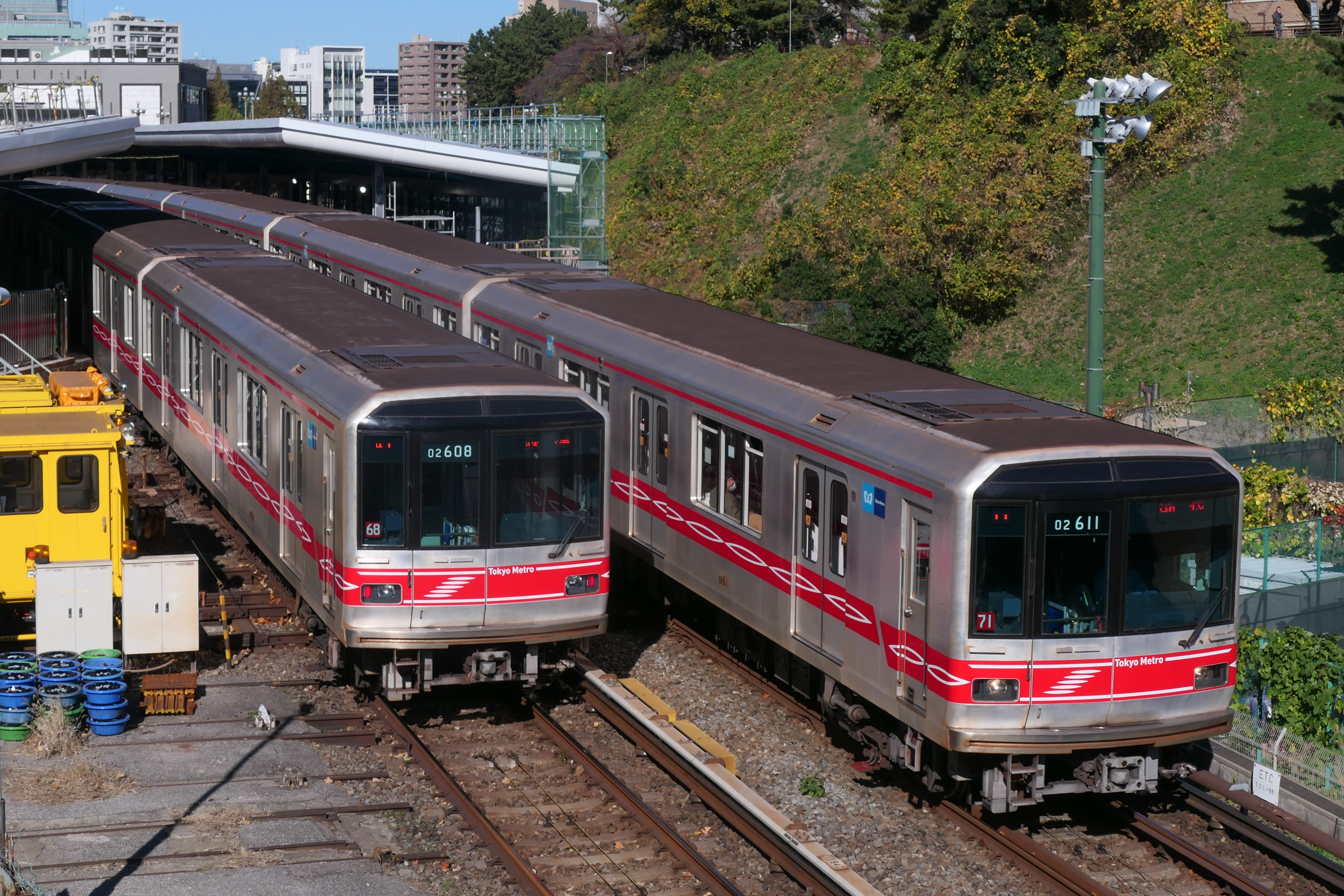
Marunouchi Line 02 series

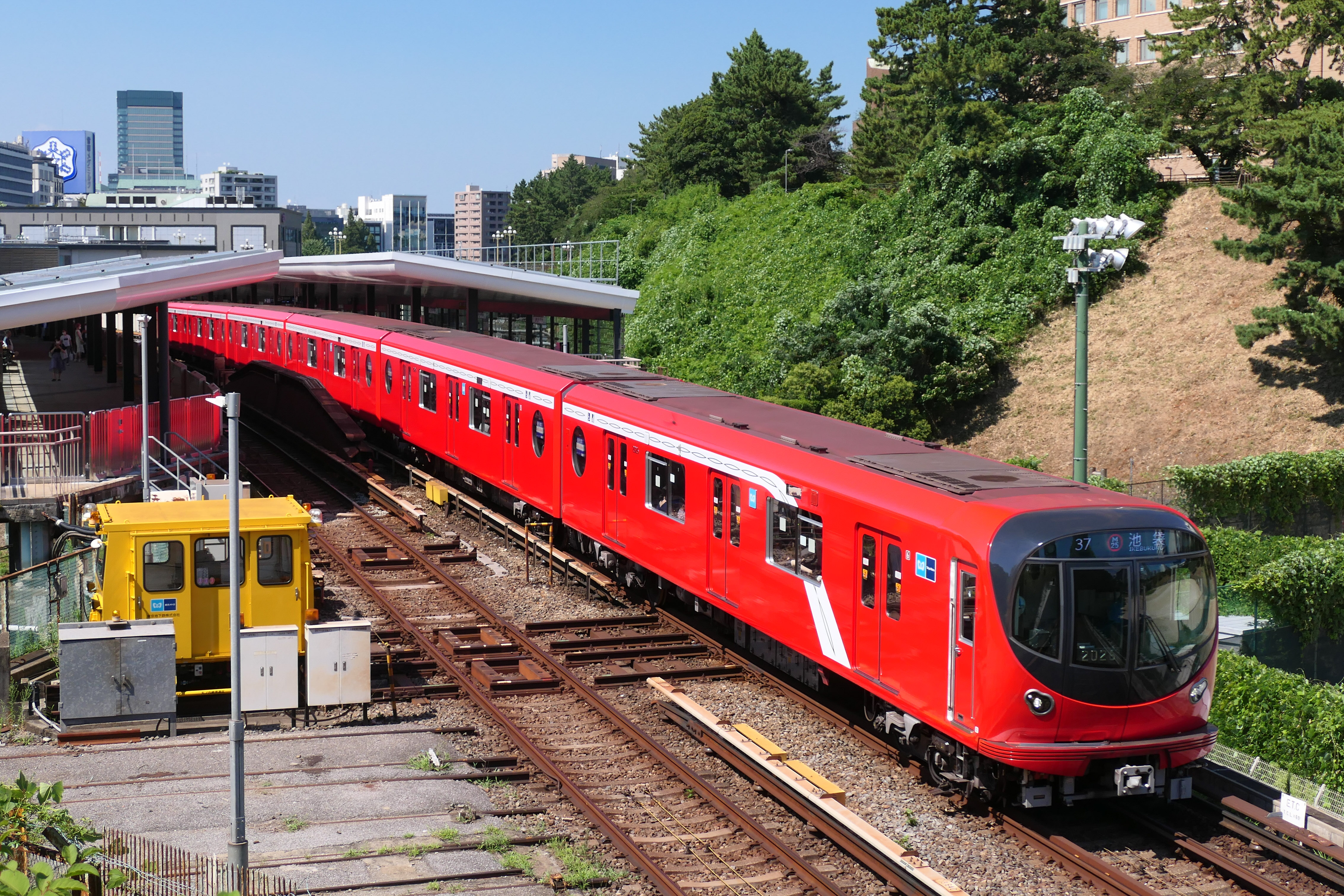
Marunouchi Line 2000 series

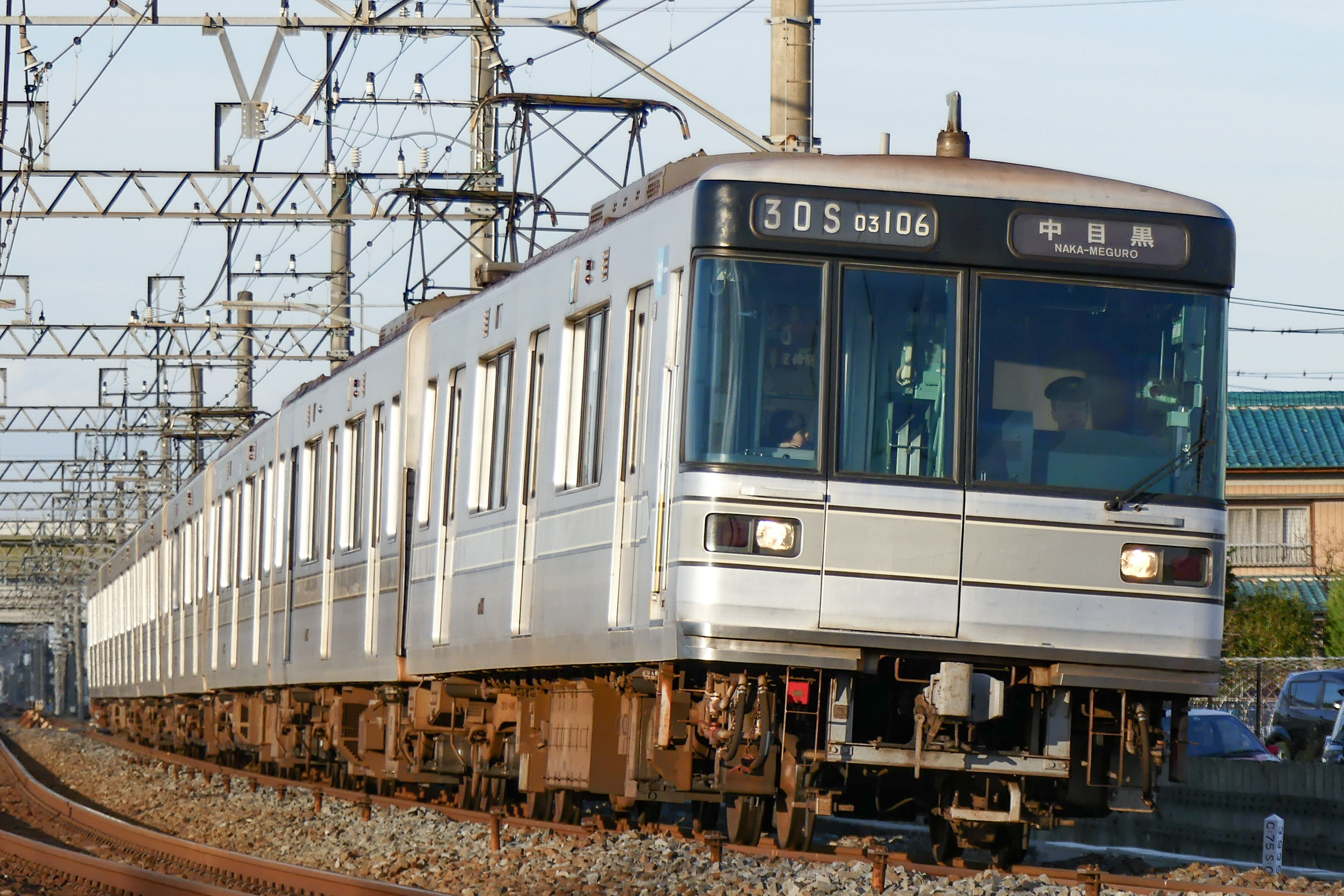
Tozai line 03 series

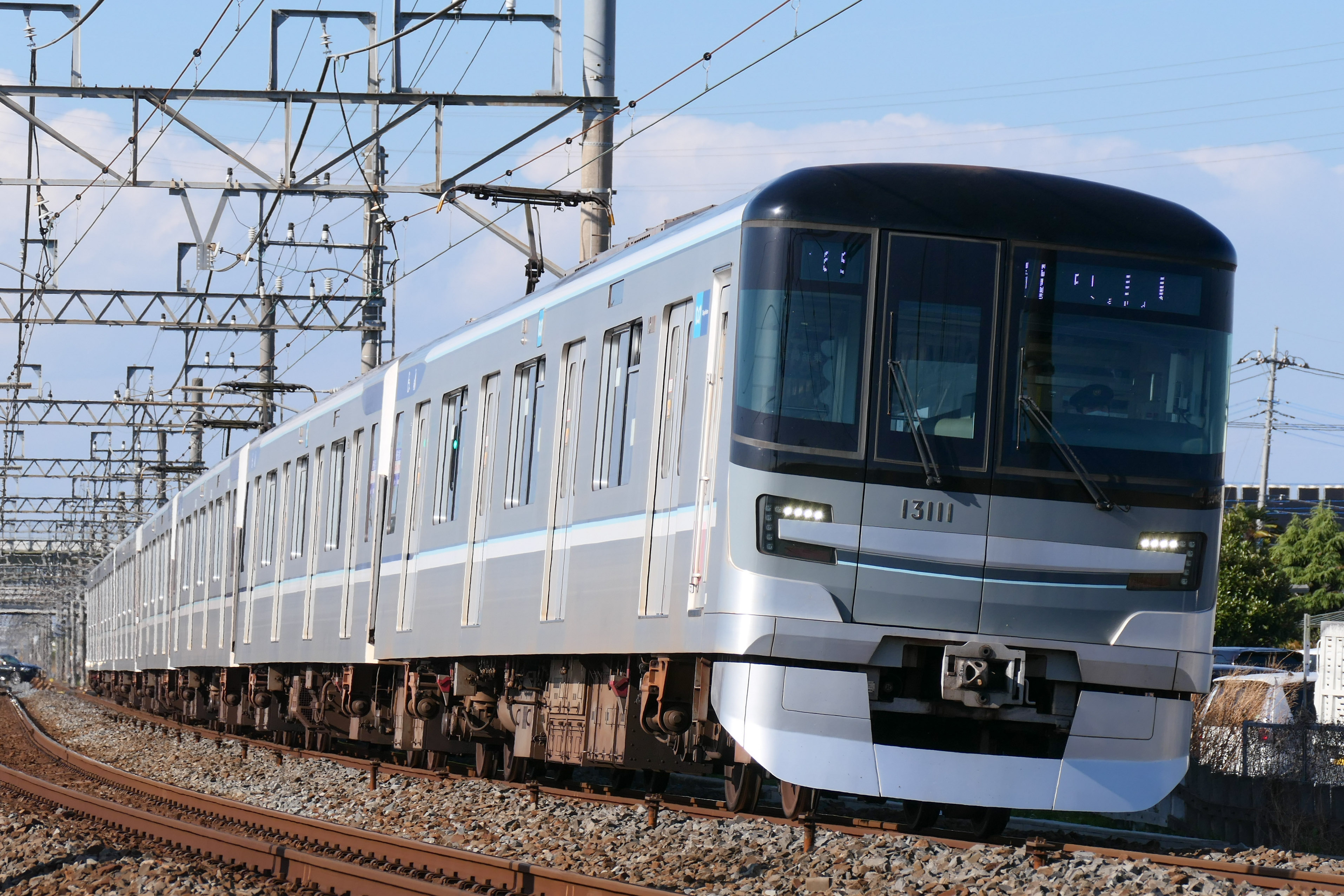
Hibiya Line 13000 series

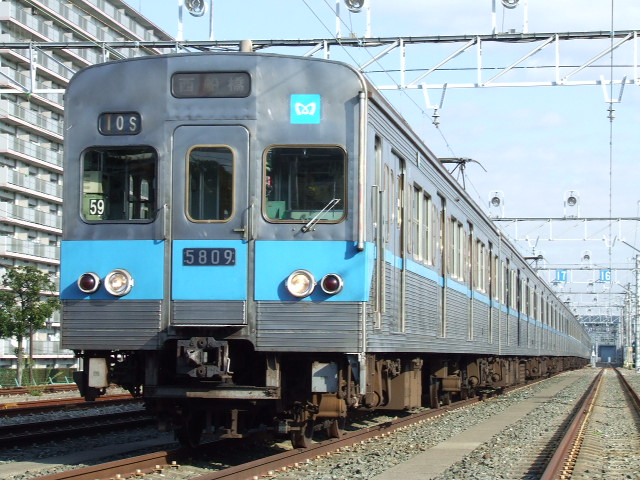
Tozai line 5000 series

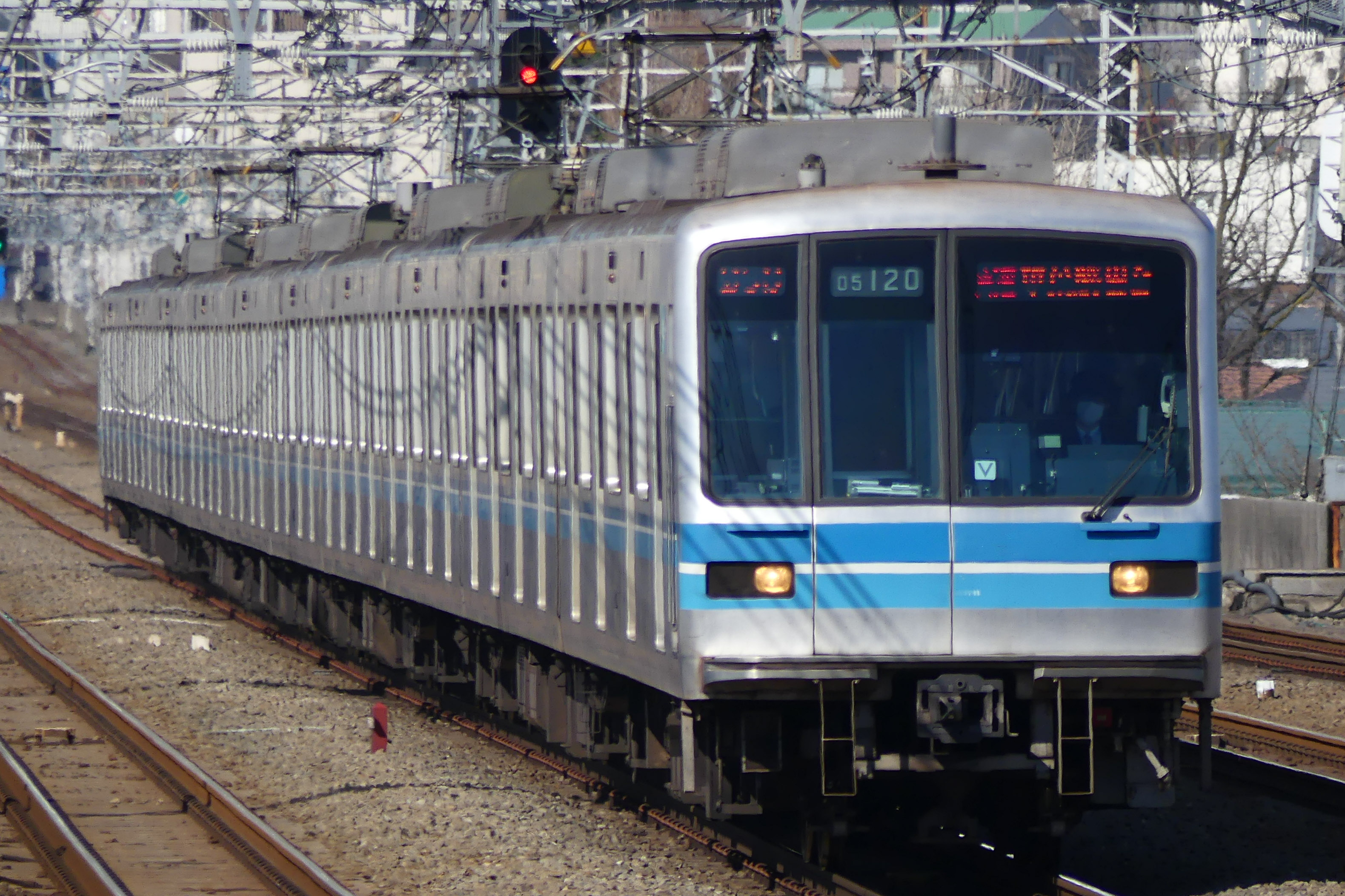
Tōzai Line 05 series

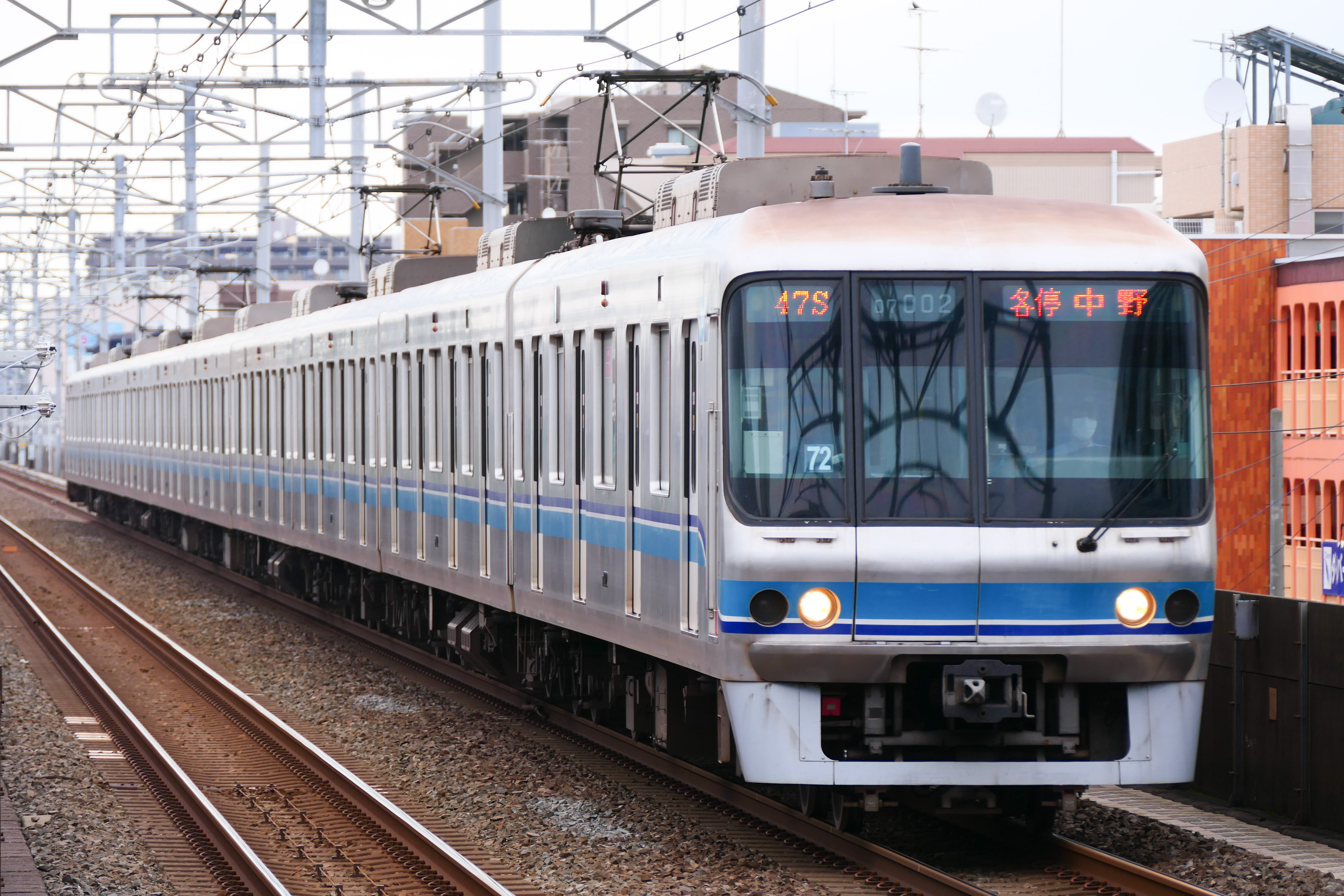
Tōzai line 07 series

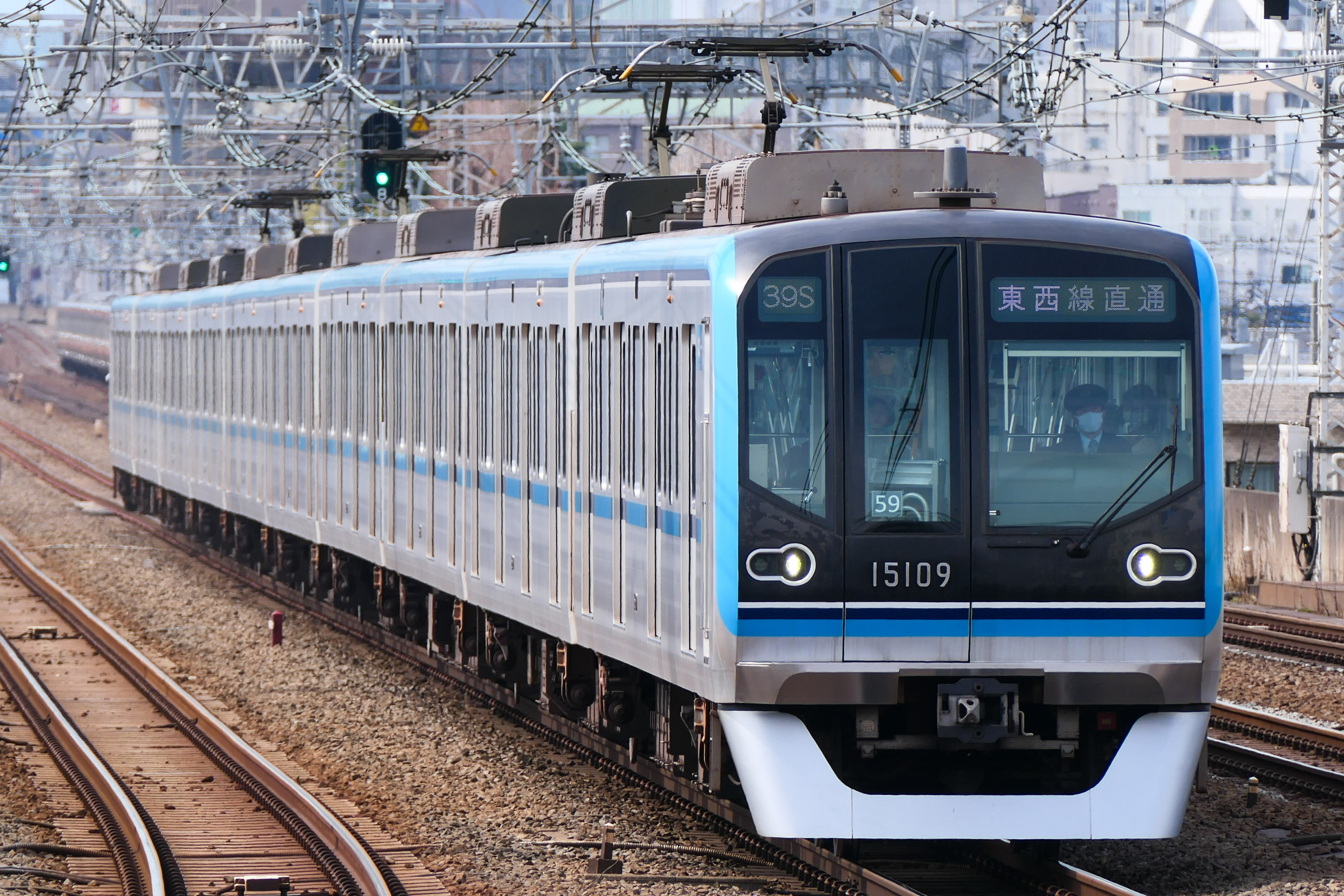
Tōzai line 15000 series

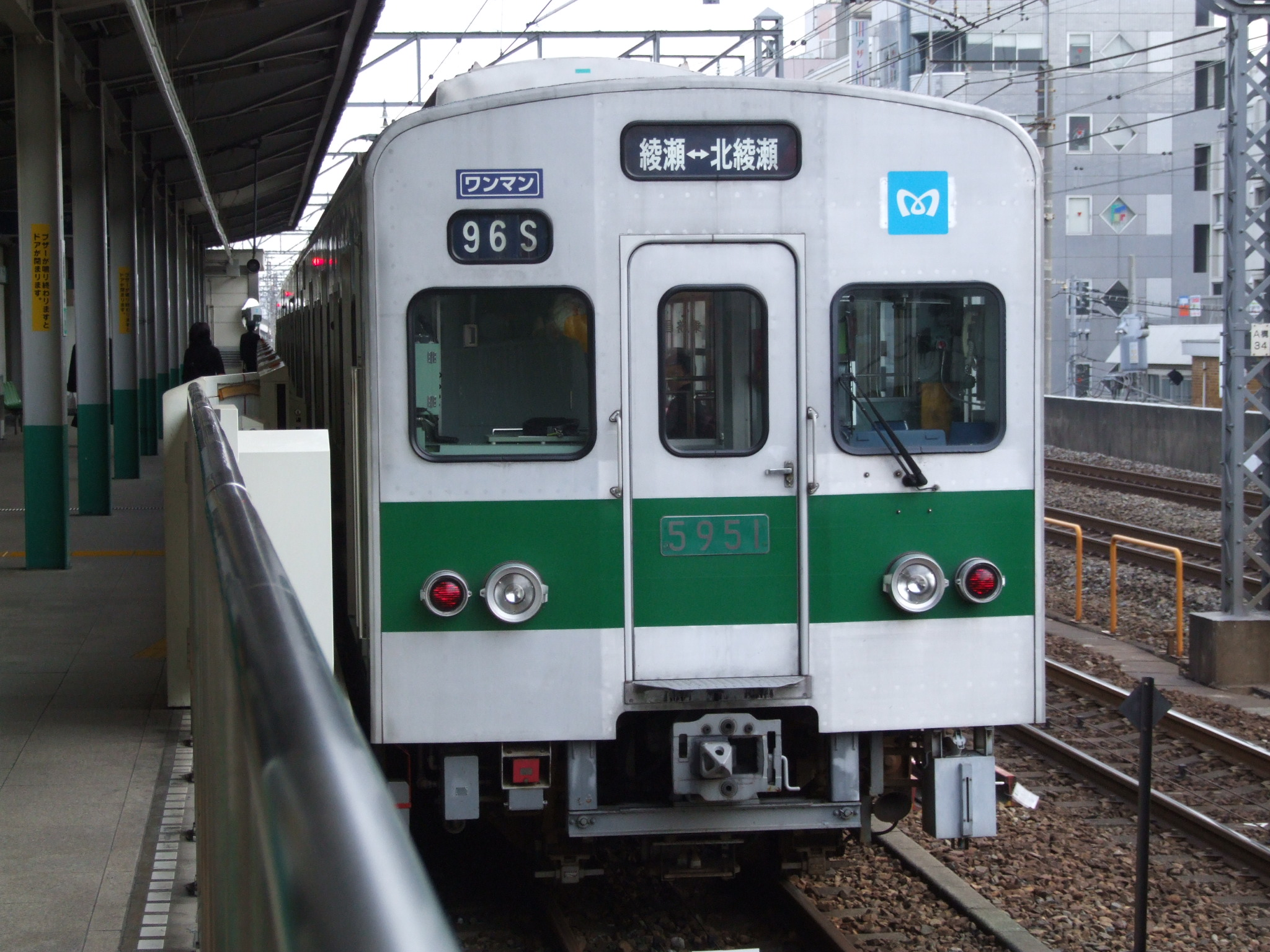
Chiyoda Line 5000 series

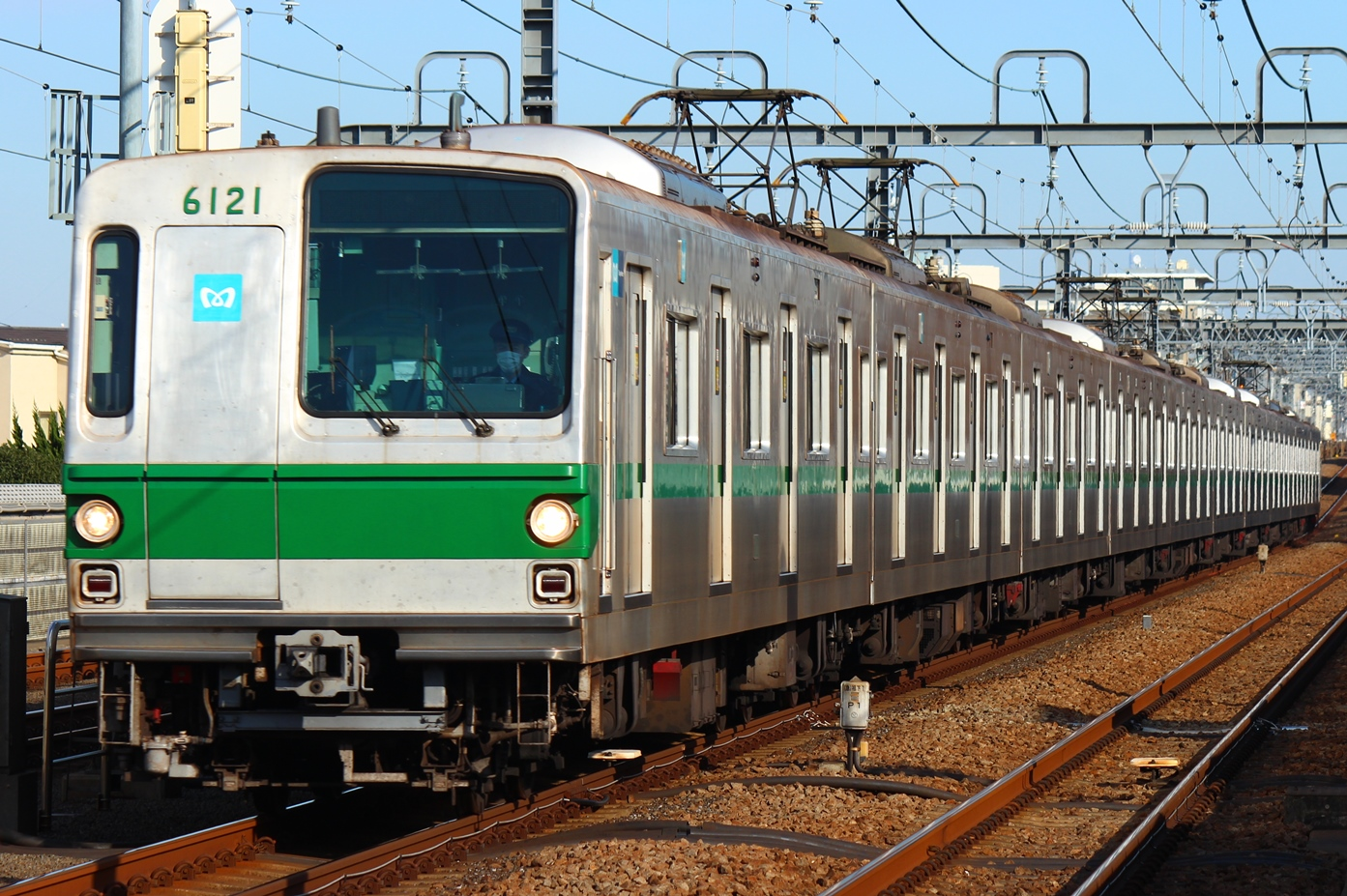
Chiyoda Line 6000 series

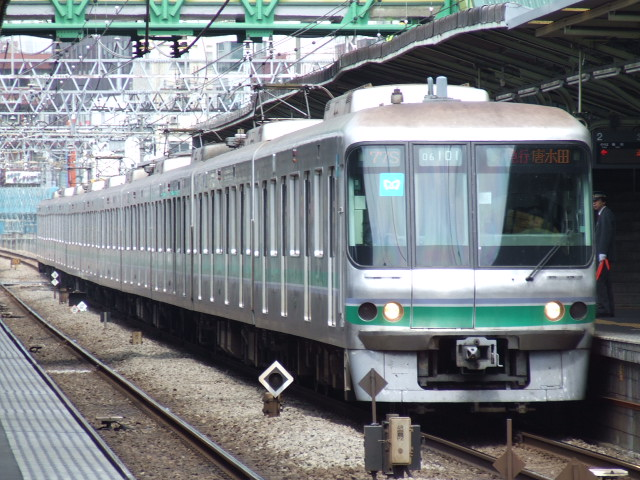
Chiyoda Line 06 series

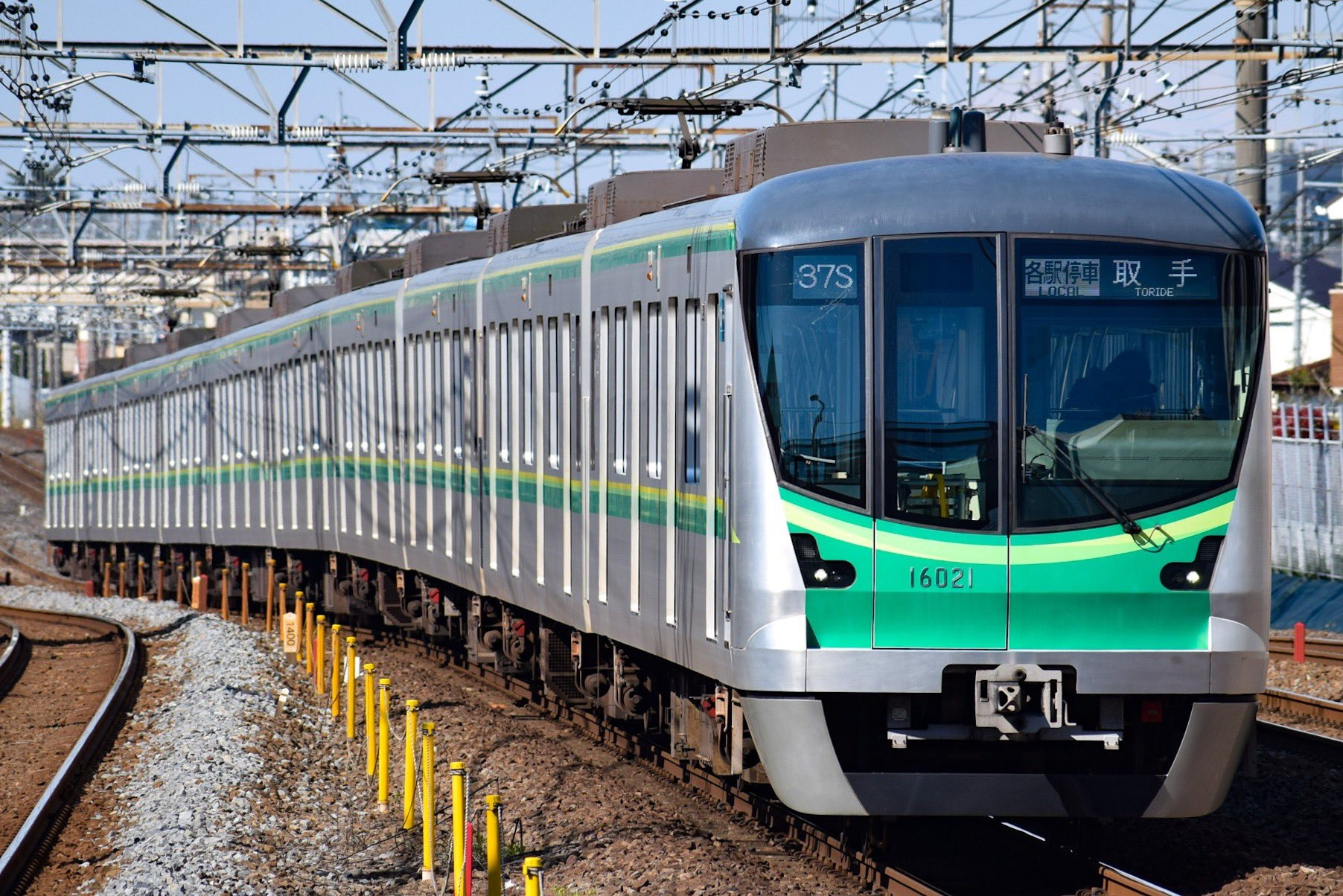
Chiyoda Line 16000 series

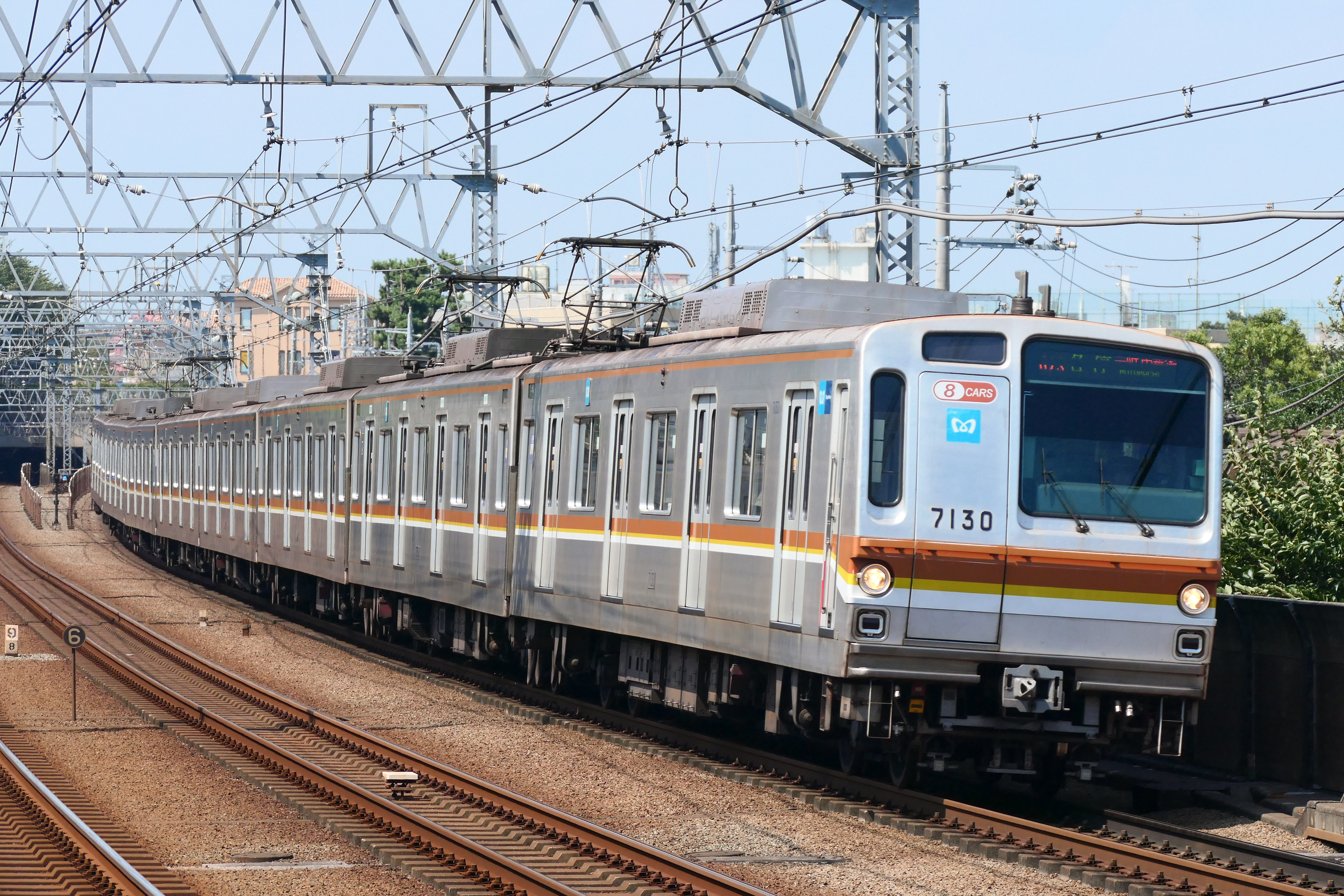
Yūrakuchō and Fukutoshin lines 7000 series

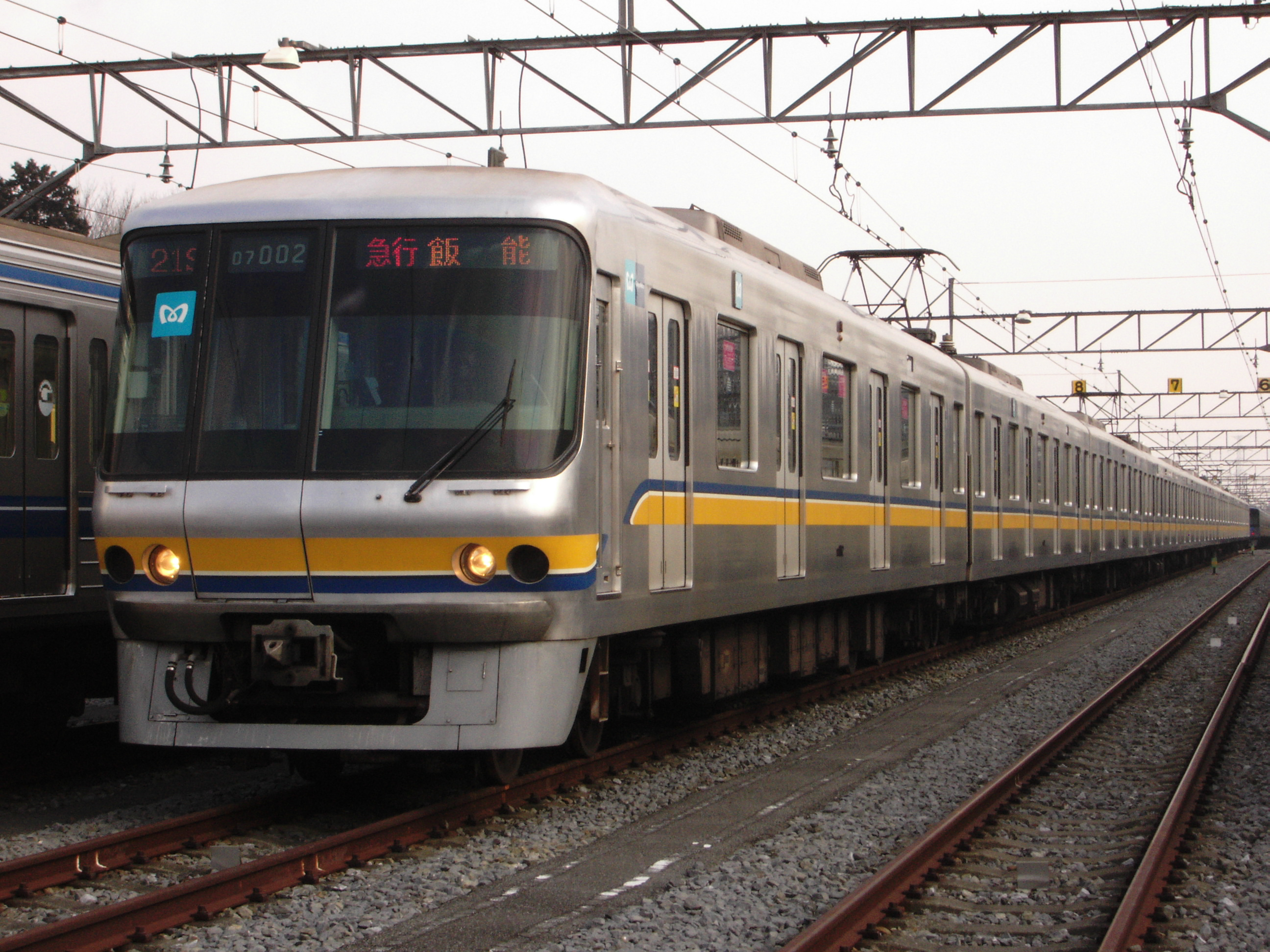
Yurakucho line 07 series

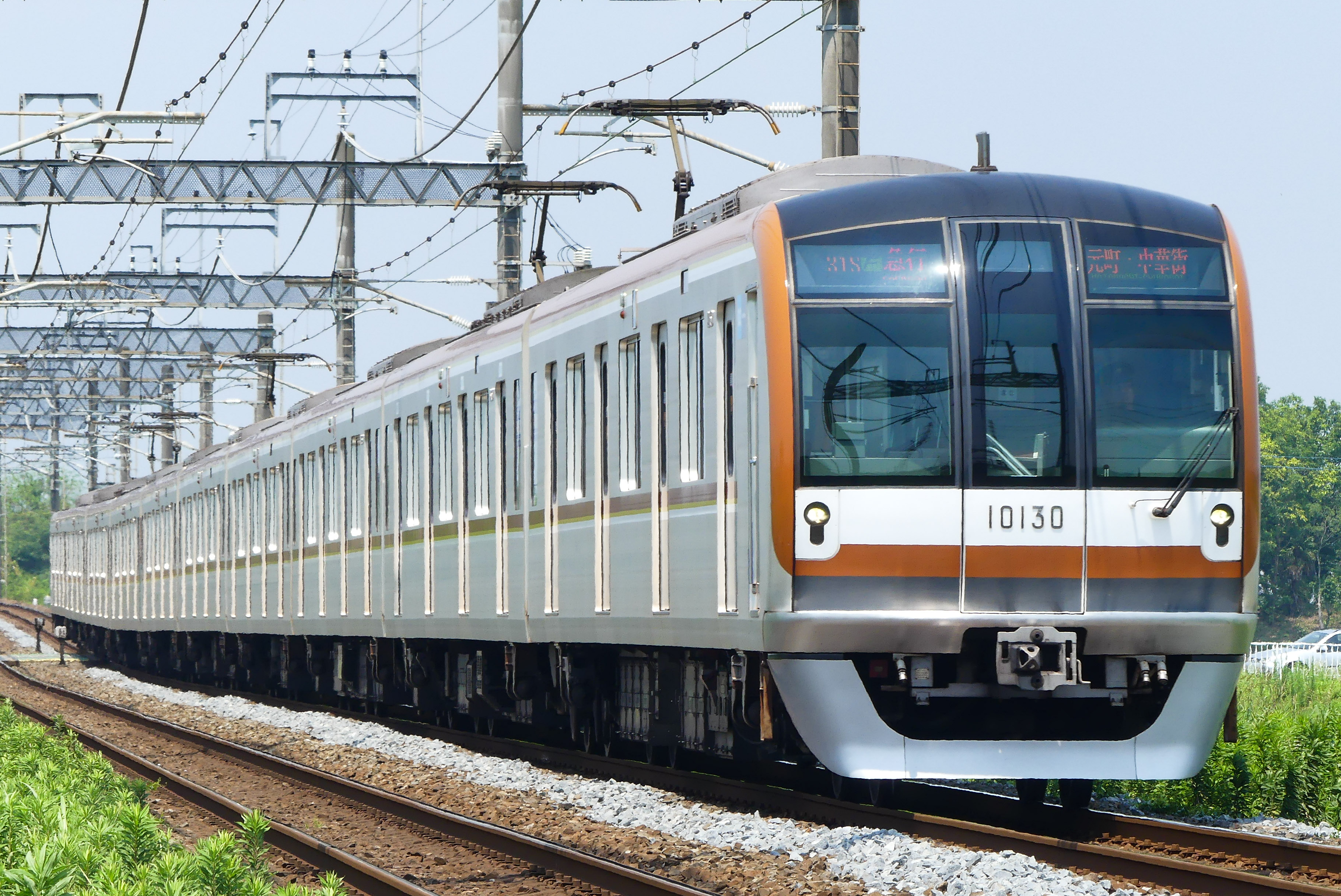
Yūrakuchō and Fukutoshin lines 10000 series

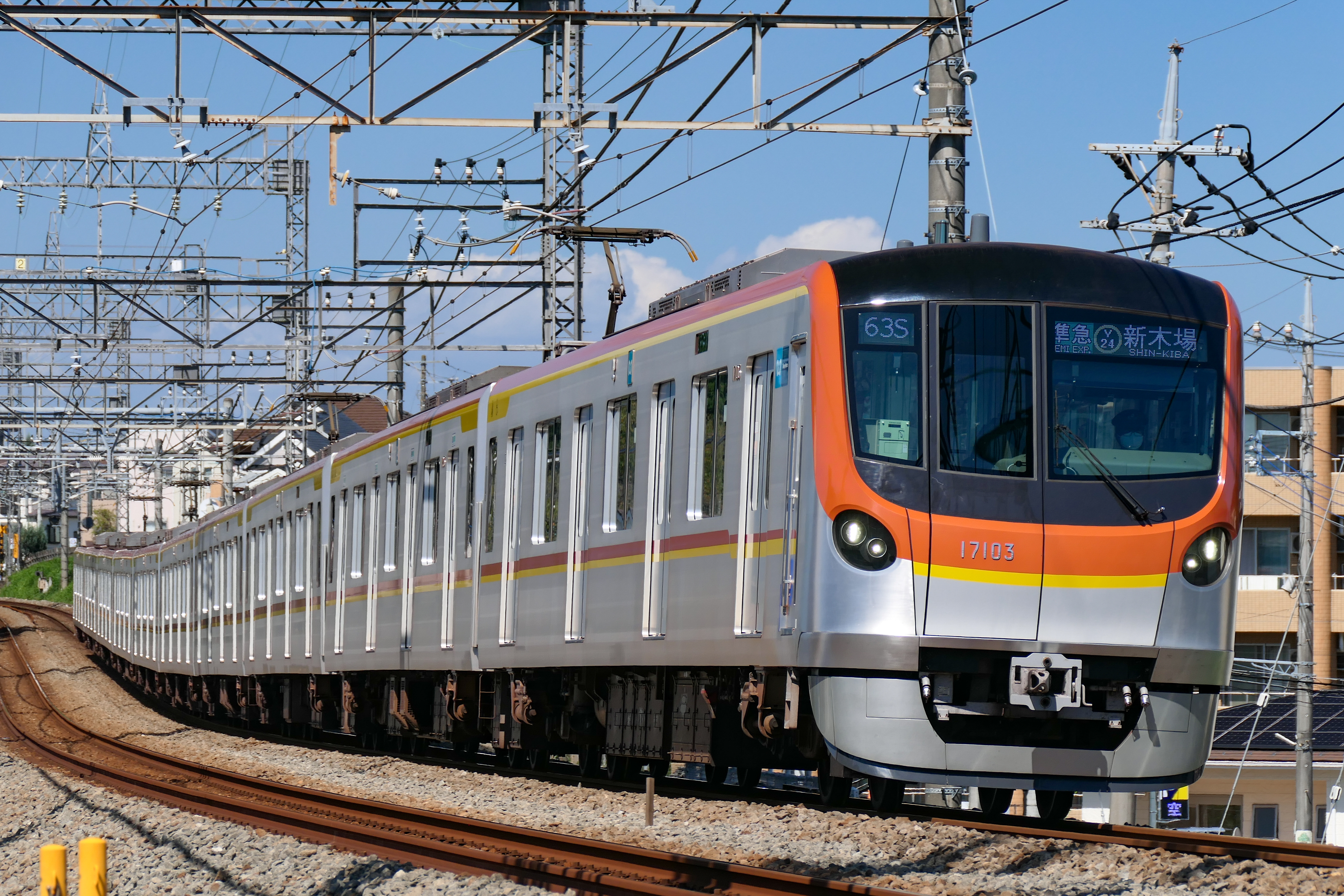
Yūrakuchō and Fukutoshin lines 17000 series

Hanzōmon Line 8000 series

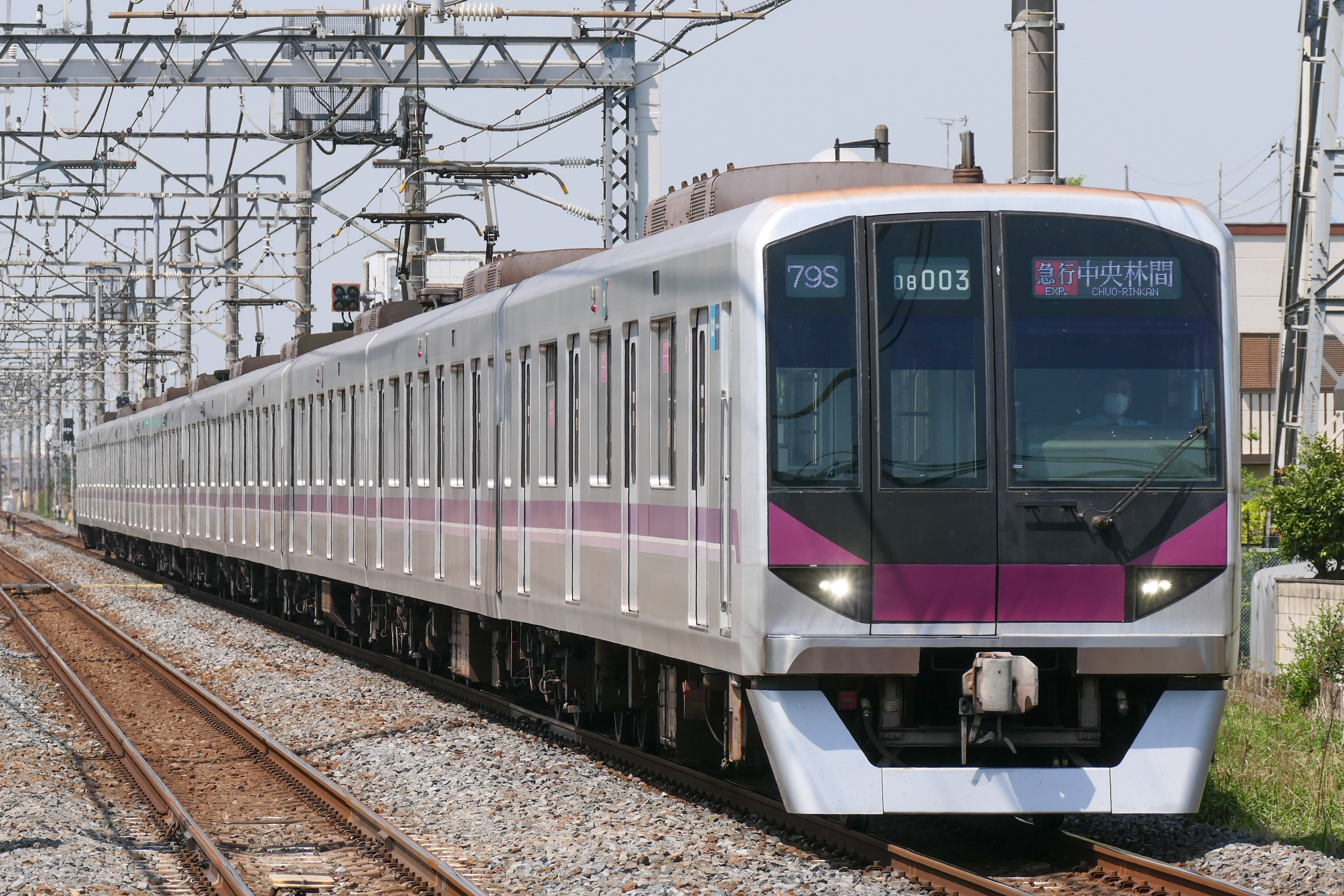
Hanzōmon Line 08 series

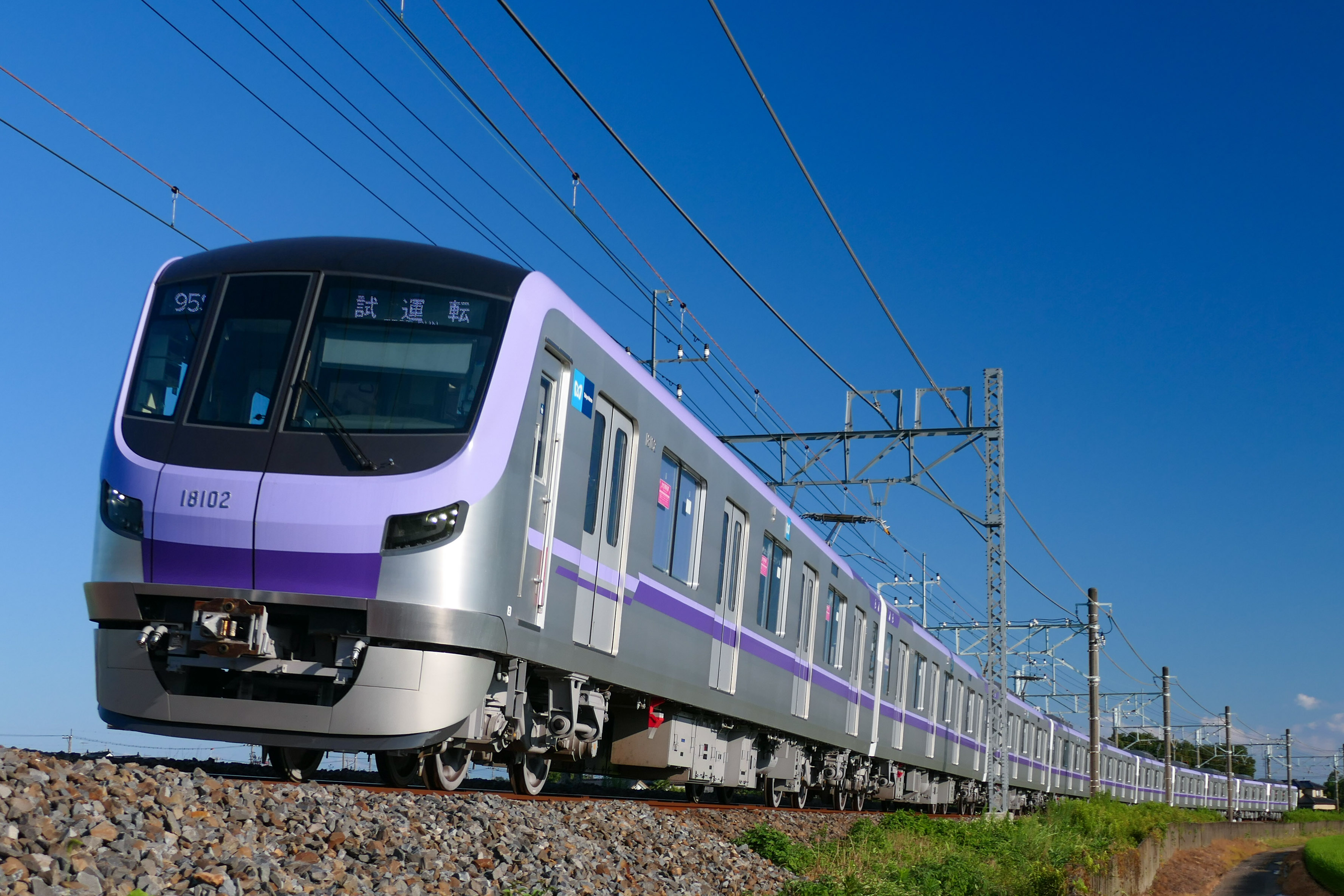
Hanzōmon Line 18000 series

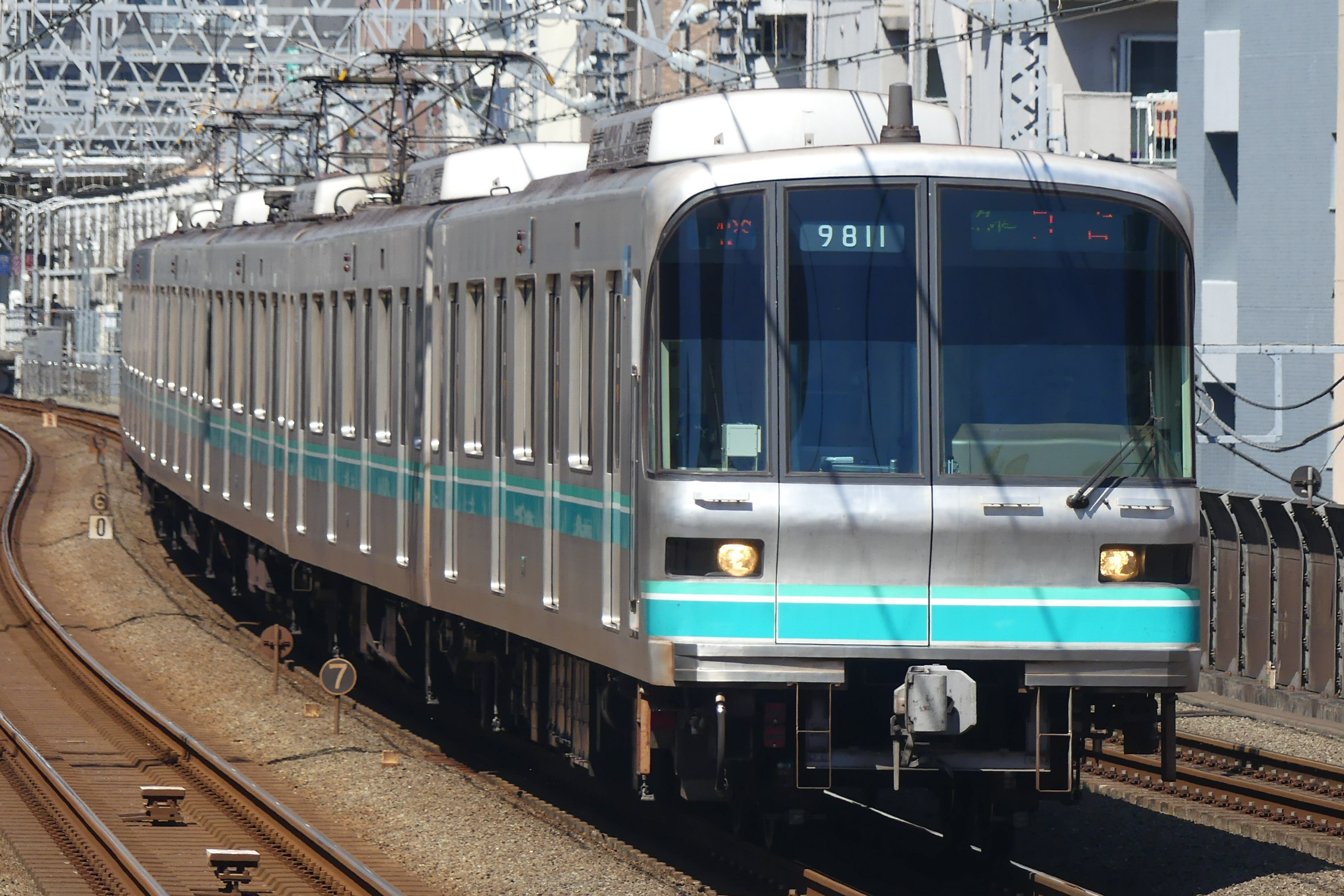
Namboku Line 9000 series

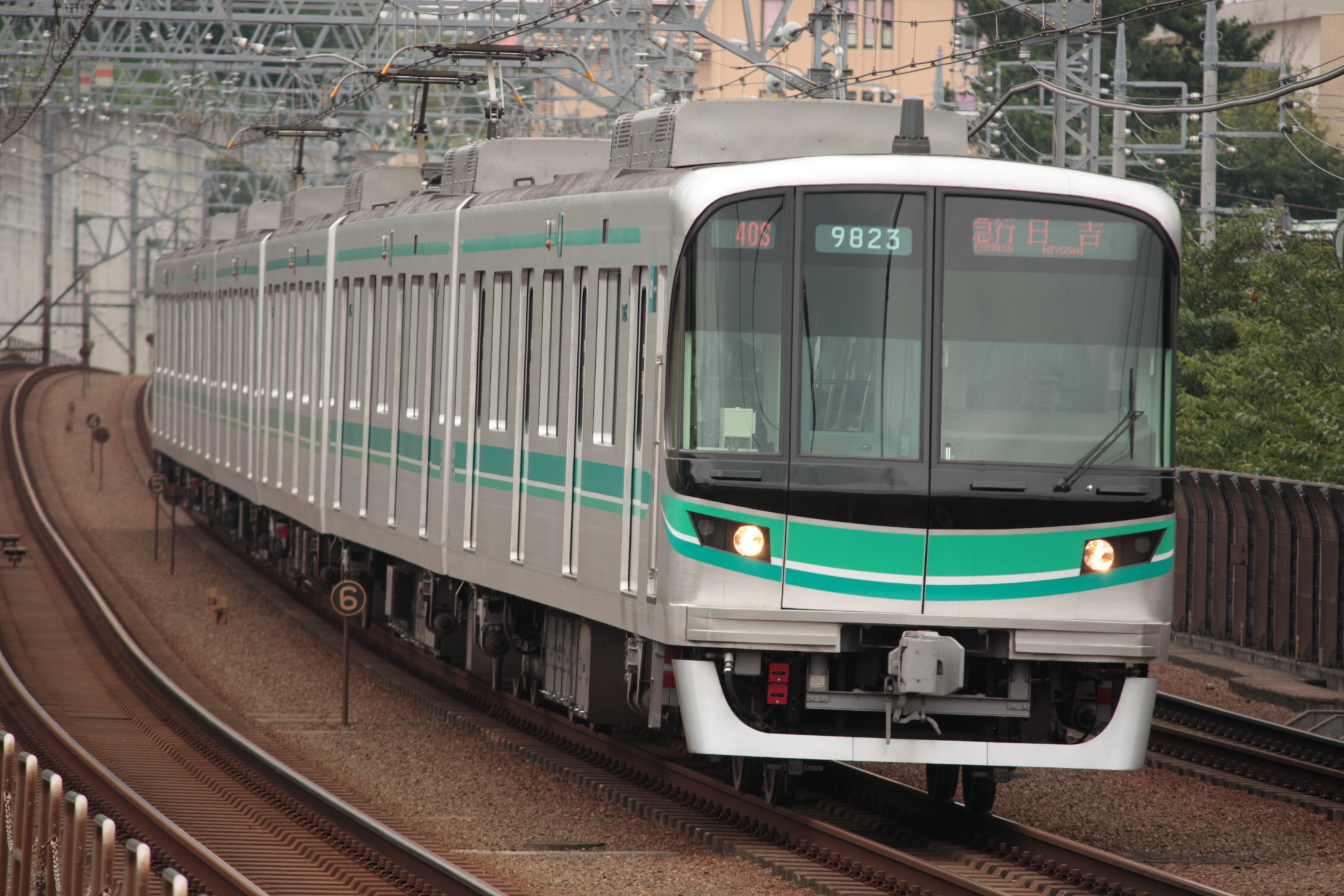
Namboku Line 9000 series

== Future expansion ==
Tokyo Metro indicated in its public share offering that it would cease line construction once the Fukutoshin Line was completed. That line was completed in March 2013 with the opening of the connection with the Tōkyū Tōyoko Line at Shibuya Station, allowing through service as far as Motomachi-Chūkagai Station in Yokohama. There are several lines such as the Hanzōmon Line that still have extensions in their official plans, and in the past, these plans have tended to happen, though often over several decades.

In March 2022, Tokyo Metro received permission to add two new extensions to the network. Under these plans, the Yūrakuchō Line would receive a new branch from Toyosu Station to Sumiyoshi Station with three new stops (including one at Toyocho Station on the Tōzai Line) to better serve the Toyosu urban development zone, and the Namboku Line would receive an extension from Shirokane-Takanawa Station to Shinagawa Station, where it would connect with the Tokaido Shinkansen and the under-construction Chūō Shinkansen in addition to serving the surrounding business district. Both extensions are expected to open in the 2030s.

== See also ==
- List of Tokyo Metro stations
- Tokyo Subway
  - Toei Subway
- Tokyo Underground Railway
- Tokyo Rapid Railway
- Teito Rapid Transit Authority
- List of urban rail systems in Japan
- List of metro systems
