= Kyōbashi =

Kyōbashi may refer to:

- Kyōbashi, Tokyo
- Kyōbashi Station (Osaka), in Osaka
- Kyōbashi Station (Tokyo), in Tokyo
