= Furuichi Kōi =

Japanese civil engineer

Junior Second Rank Baron Furuichi Kōi
- 古市 公威
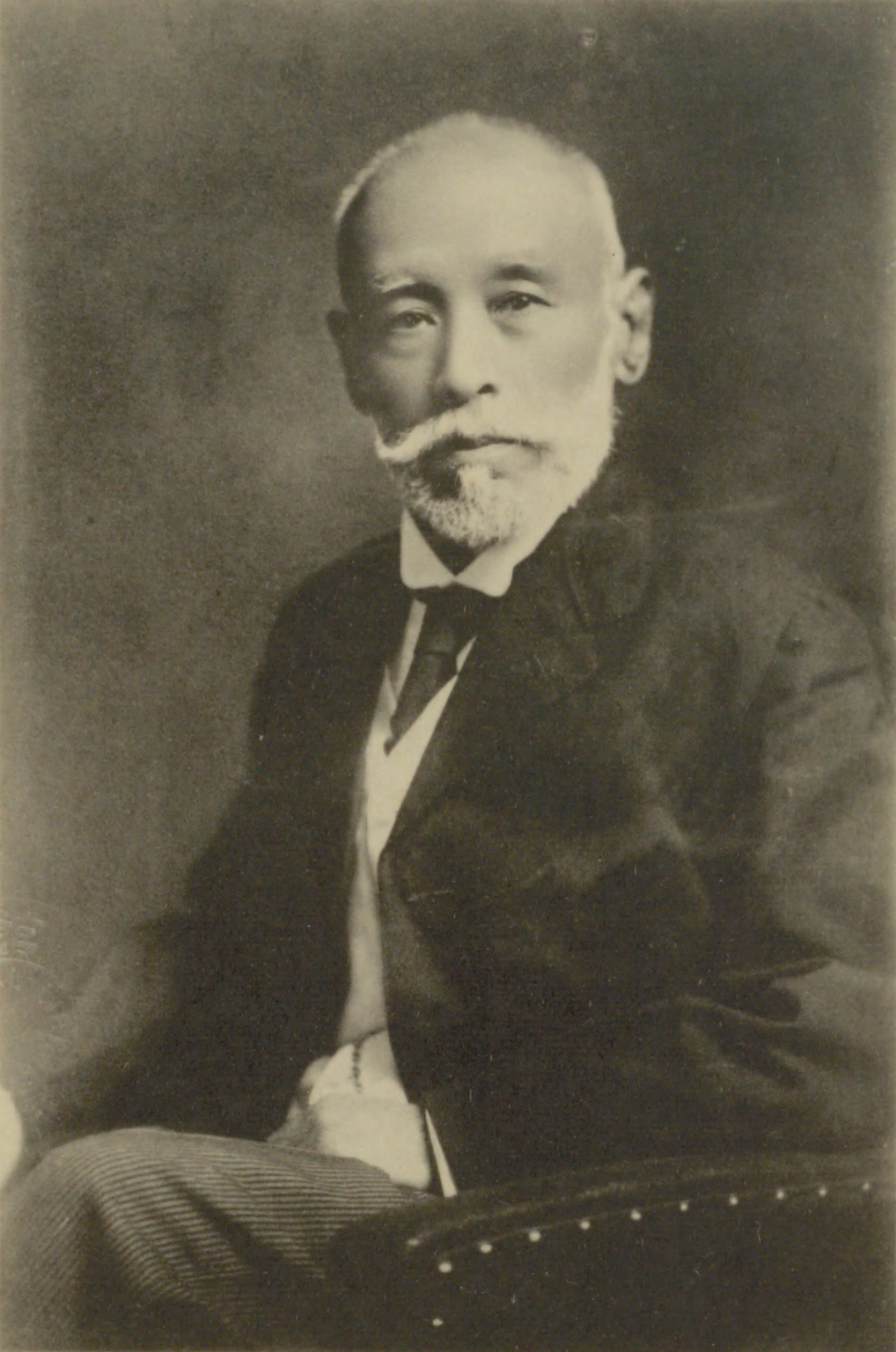
- Born: September 13, 1854; Edo, Japan
- Died: January 28, 1934 (aged 79); Tokyo, Japan
- Occupations: civil engineer, university president

Baron Furuichi Kōi (古市 公威; September 13, 1854 – January 28, 1934) was a Japanese civil engineer, who was president of Kōka Daigaku, the present college of engineering of the University of Tokyo, and founding president of the Tokyo Underground Railway, "the first underground railway in the Orient".

== Biography ==
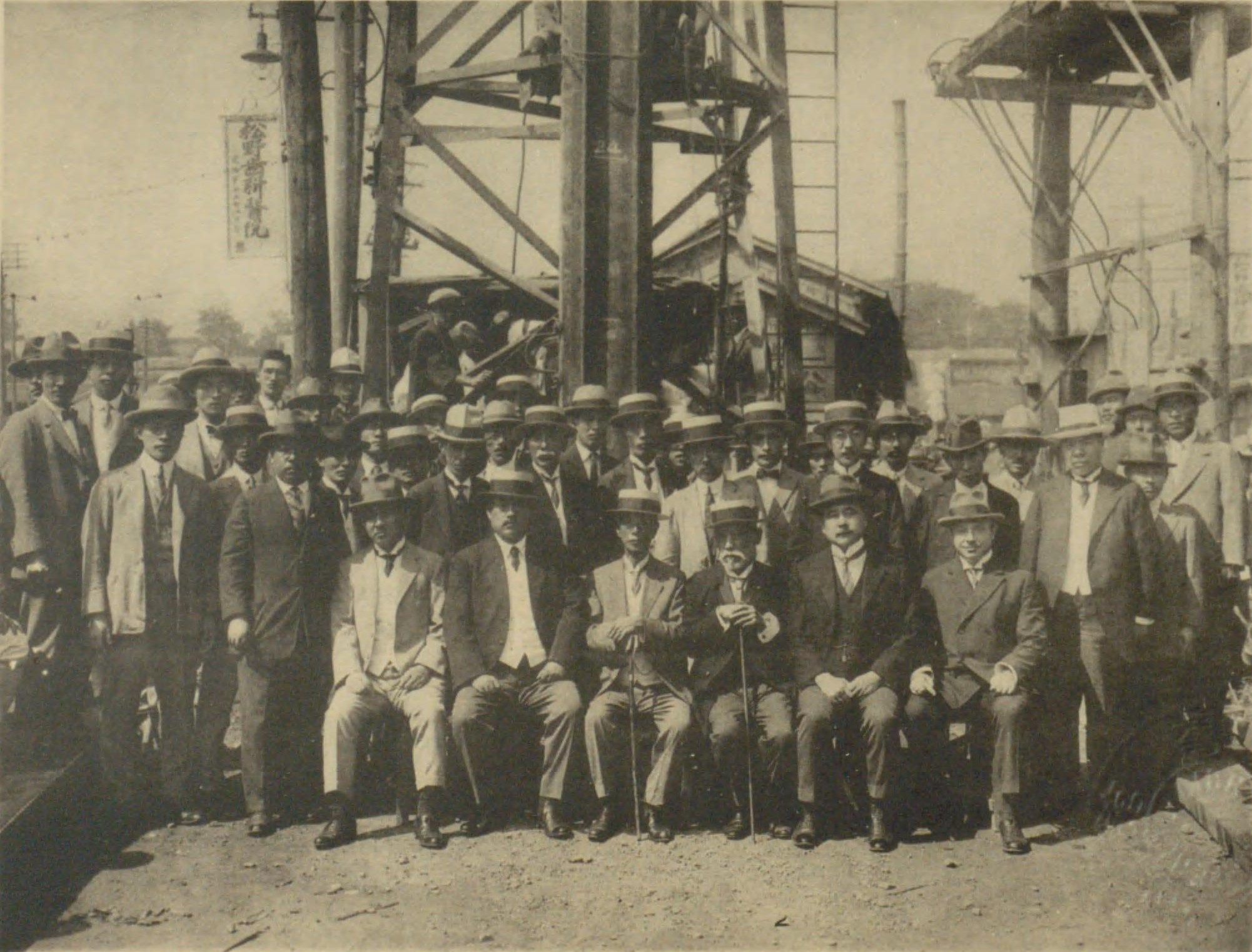
Furuichi seated 3rd from right at the groundbreaking of the Ginza Line on September 27, 1925.

In 1854 he was born as a son of Furuichi Takashi a retainer of Sakai clan in Edo. In 1869, he entered Kaisei gakkō, in 1870, he was elected student on scholarship in Himeji Domain, and entered Daigaku Nankō, then studied abroad to Ecole Centrale des Arts et Manufactures in Paris as the Ministry of Education first student studying abroad. In 1879, he graduated and got the degree of BE. In the same year he entered the Faculty of Science of University of Paris, in 1889 graduated, got Bachelor of Science, and went home and took up a post as Naimushō Doboku-kyoku Yatoi. In 1881, he became the University of Tokyo lecturer and after that, he concurrently held the posts of the university teacher with the bureaucrat technical expert.

In 1886, when he was 32 years old, he was installed in Kōka Daigaku which was the forerunner of Tokyo Daigaku Kōgakubu (the University of Tokyo engineering department) first president, in 1888 was received the degree of the first Kōgaku Hakushi (Doctor of Engineering) and in 1894 was installed in the first engineering works Doboku Gikan (Vice-Minister for Engineering Affairs) in Naimushō.

He attempted to improve an engineering works public administration and established Doboku Hōki (an engineering works law). His typical services include the construction of Yokohama-ko. He helped to improve the reputation of engineering in Japan in the world as the first chairman of Nihon Kōgakkai (Japan Federation of Engineering Societies).

He would join Noritsugu Hayakawa as president of the Tokyo Underground Railway in 1920, founding the first subway system in Asia.

== Legacy ==
The famous Japanese author Kamitake Hiraoka better known as Yukio Mishima was named after Furuichi Koi and his first name 'Kamitake' was pronounced as 'Koi' by family members. This was a gesture of honour as Koi was a benefactor of Mishima grandfather's clan - Sadataro.
