= Ginza-itchōme Station =

Metro station in Tokyo, Japan

Coordinates: 35°40′27.6456″N 139°46′1.3692″E

Ginza-itchōme Station 銀座一丁目駅

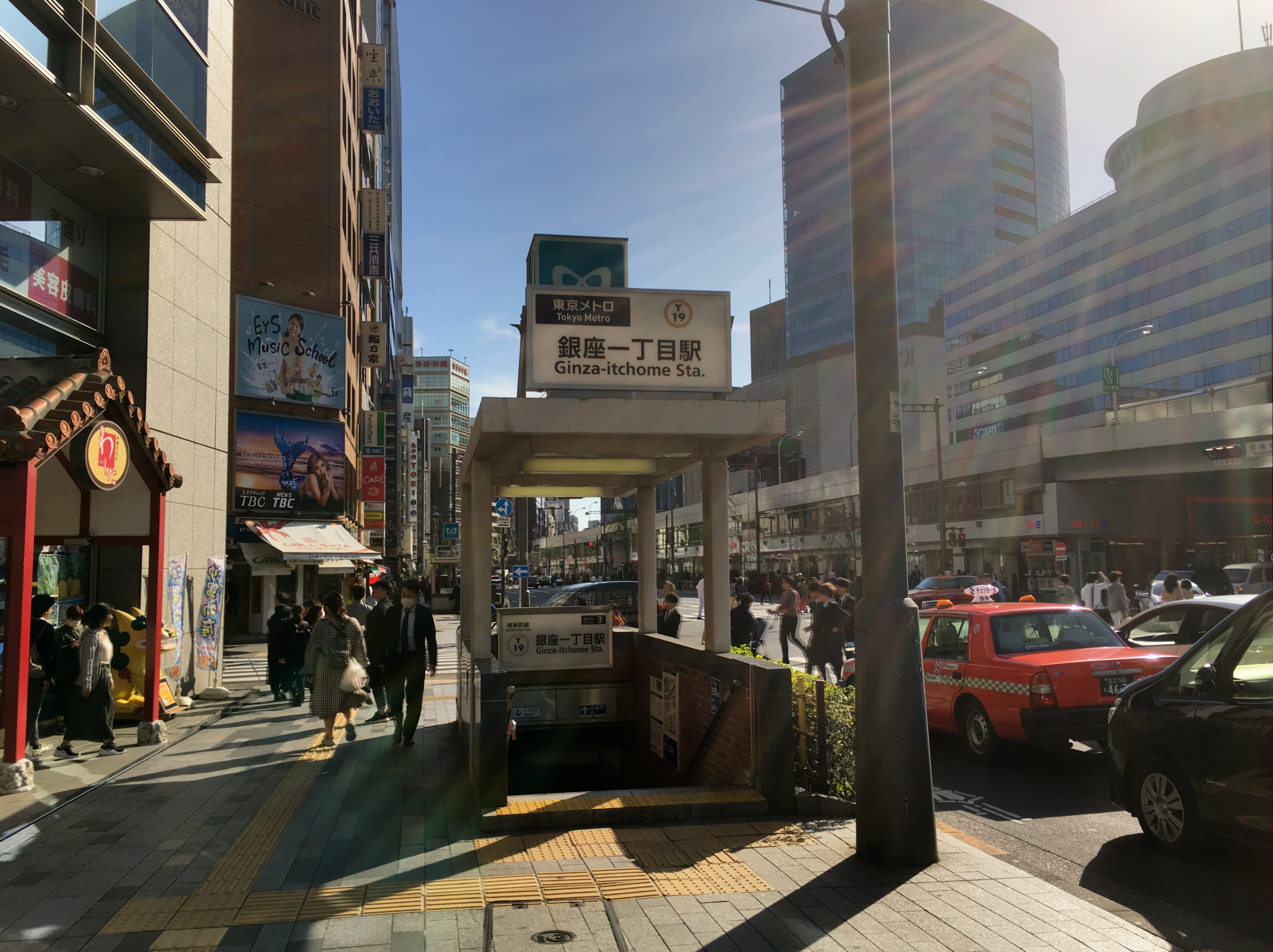
- Exit 3 in April 2019

General information
- Location: 1-7-12 Ginza, Chūō-ku, Tokyo; Japan
- Operator: Tokyo Metro
- Line: Yūrakuchō Line
- Distance: 21.7 km (13.5 mi) from Wakōshi
- Platforms: 2 split-level side platforms
- Tracks: 2
- Connections: Ginza

Construction
- Structure type: Underground
- Platform levels: 2

Other information
- Station code: Y-19
- Website: Official website

History
- Opened: 30 October 1974; 51 years ago

Passengers
- FY2012: 33,836 daily

Services
Preceding station	Tokyo Metro	Following station
Yūrakuchō towards Wakoshi	Yūrakuchō Line	Shintomichō towards Shin-kiba
Location
- Location within Tokyo Yamanote Loop Location within Tokyo wards area Location within Japan

Ginza-itchōme Station (銀座一丁目駅, Ginza-itchōme-eki) is a subway station on the Tokyo Metro Yurakucho Line in Chūō, Tokyo, Japan, operated by the Tokyo subway operator Tokyo Metro. It is numbered Y-19.

== Lines ==
Sakuradamon Station is served by the Tokyo Metro Yūrakuchō Line from Wakōshi in Saitama Prefecture to Shin-Kiba in Tokyo, and is located 21.7 km from the line's starting point at Wakōshi. Through services operate to and from the Tobu Tojo Line and Seibu Ikebukuro Line.

== Station layout ==
The station consists of two split platforms above and below each other on separate levels, serving two tracks. Platform 1 (for Shin-Kiba-bound trains) is on the third basement ("B3F") level, and platform 2 (for Wakōshi-bound trains) is on the fourth basement ("B4F") level.

=== Platforms ===
1	Yūrakuchō Line	Toyosu and Shin-Kiba
2	Yūrakuchō Line	for Ikebukuro, Kotake-mukaihara, and Wakoshi; Tobu Tojo Line for Shinrinkōen; Seibu Ikebukuro Line for Hannō

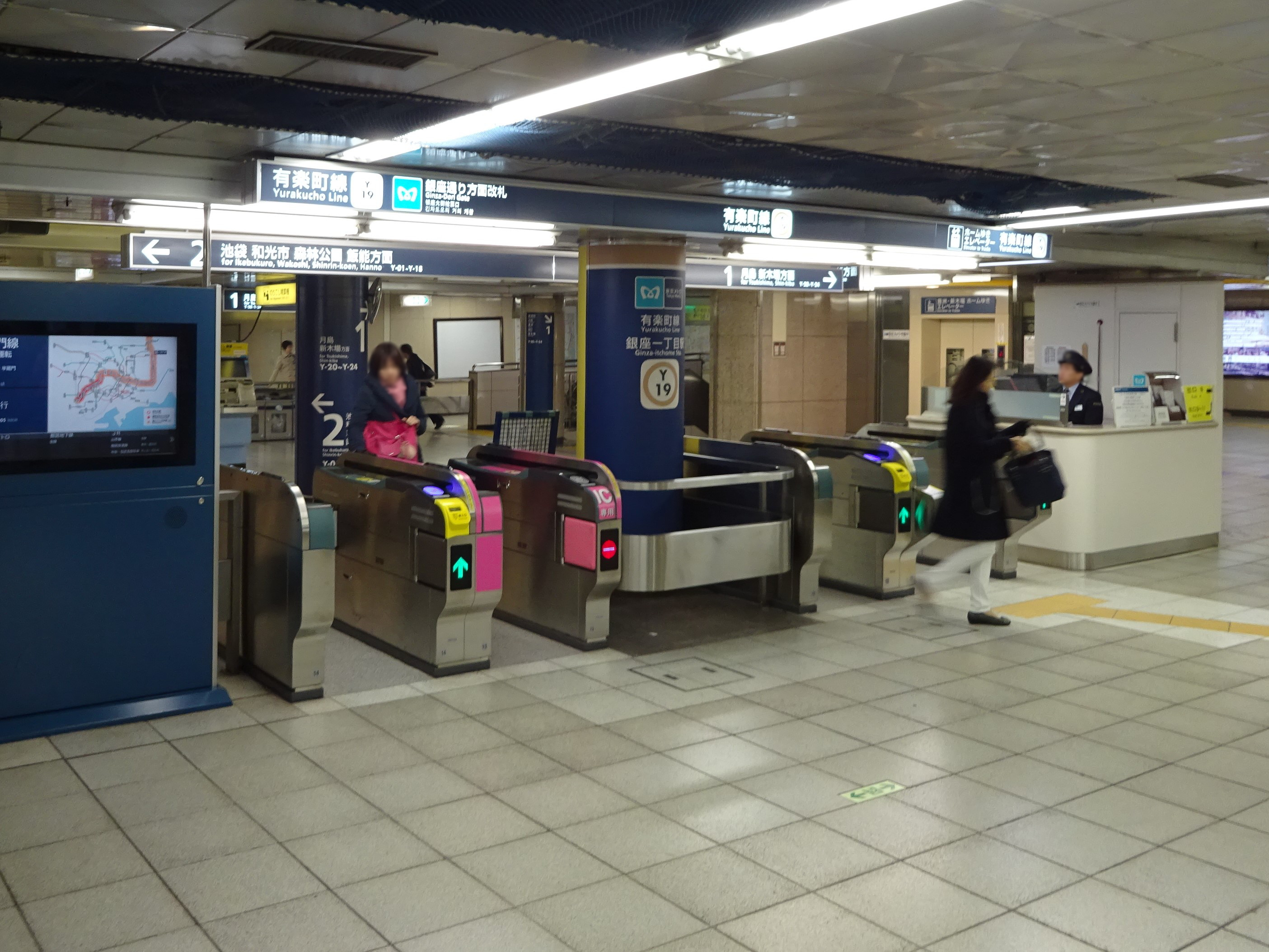
Ginza-Dori Gate

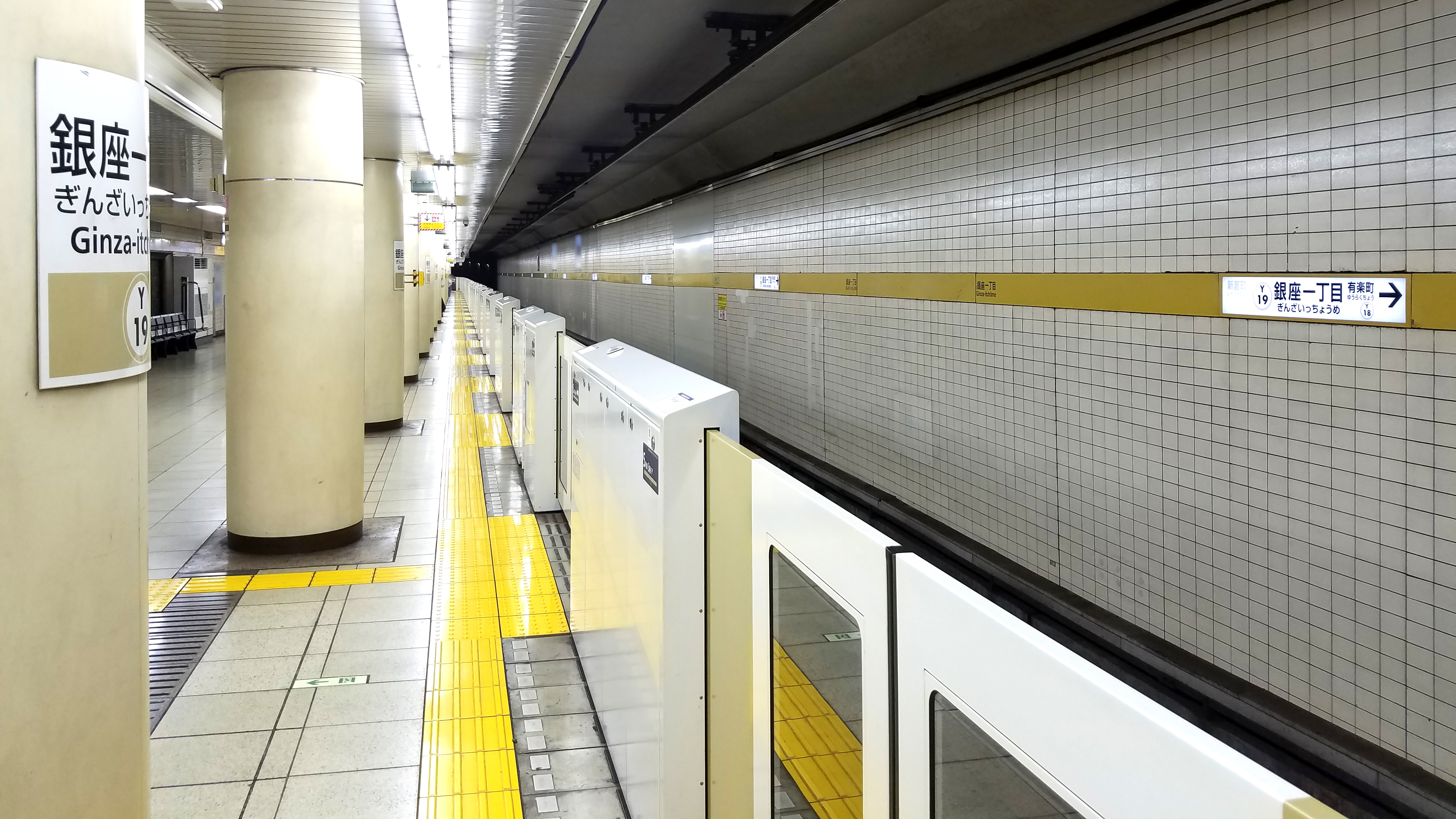
Platform 2, 2020

== History ==
The station was opened on 30 October 1974 by the Teito Rapid Transit Authority (TRTA). Chest-high platform edge doors were brought into use at the station from 14 April 2012.

== Passenger statistics ==
In fiscal 2012 the station was used by an average of 33,836 passengers daily. The passenger figures for previous years are as shown below.

Fiscal year	Daily average
2010	34,703
2011	33,658
2012	33,836

== Surrounding area ==
- Yurakucho Station ( Tokyo Metro Yurakucho Line)
- Ginza Station ( Tokyo Metro Ginza Line, Tokyo Metro Marunouchi Line, Tokyo Metro Hibiya Line)
- Kyobashi Station ( Tokyo Metro Ginza Line)
- National Route 15 ("Chuo Dori")
- Ginza Wako
- Matsuya Co.
- Tokyo Kotsu Kaikan

== See also ==
- List of railway stations in Japan
