= Noritsugu Hayakawa =

Noritsugu Hayakawa 早川徳次
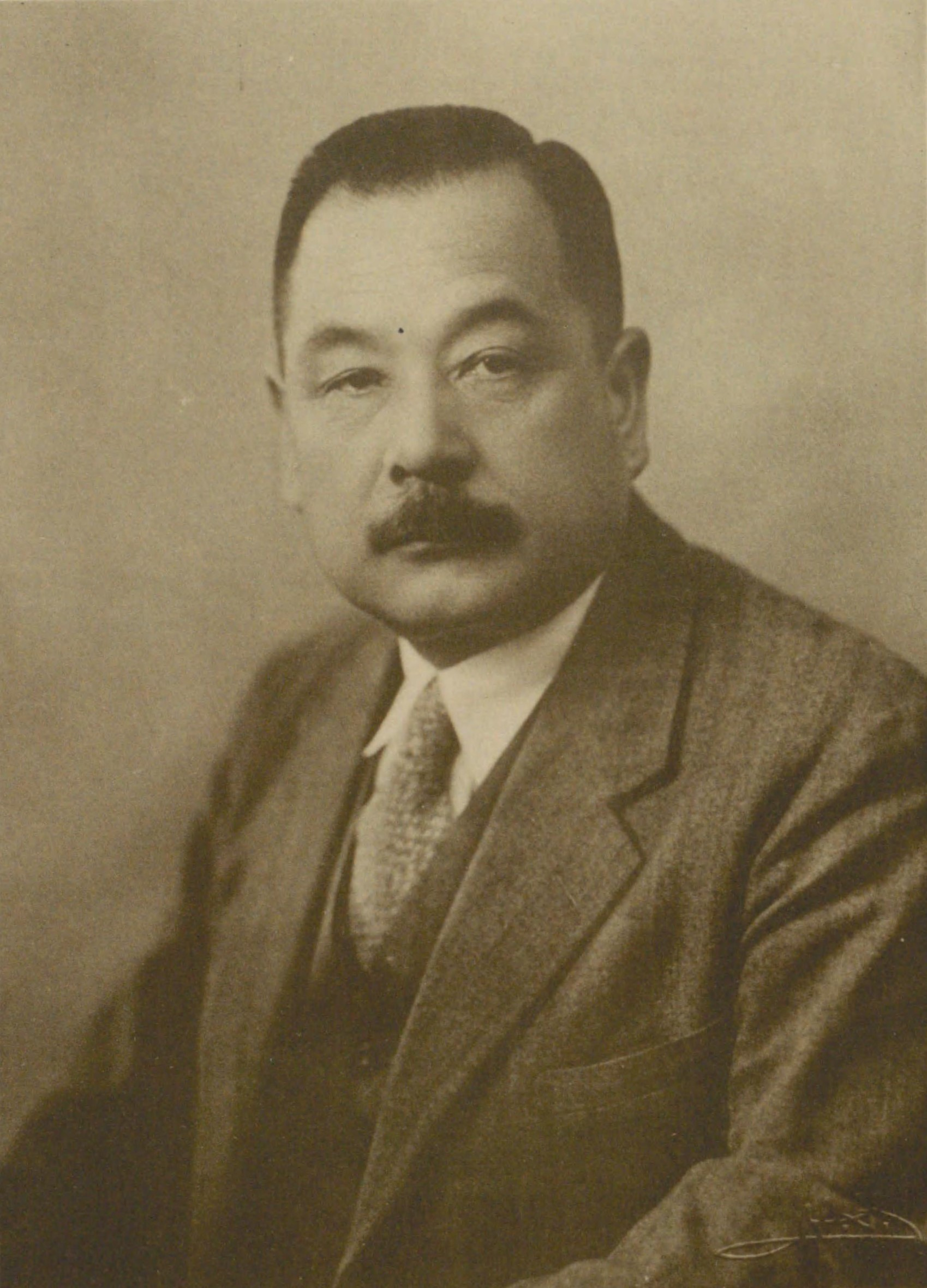
- Born: October 15, 1881; Yamanashi Prefecture, Japan
- Died: November 29, 1942 (aged 61)
- Occupation: Businessman

Noritsugu Hayakawa (早川徳次, Hayakawa Noritsugu; 1881–1942) was a Japanese businessman. He is renowned for funding the construction of Japan's first subway system, now known as the Tokyo Metro Ginza Line, which opened in 1927.

== Biography ==
=== Early life ===
Hayakawa was born into a family of politicians in Miyosaki, Yamanashi Prefecture, in 1881.

=== Early career in rail transport ===
Hayakawa studied law at Waseda University and made the bold move of sending an article he wrote about national policy to the statesman Shinpei Goto, who had been serving as head of South Manchuria Railway (Mantetsu), leading to Goto offering him a job as his secretary and starting Hayakawa's career in the railway industry. Hayakawa worked for Mantetsu before moving to Japan's Railway Bureau, following in the steps of Goto, who proved to be not only a major influence but also a source of connections to powerful people in Imperial Japan. Hayakawa subsequently worked for several railroads in Japan.

=== Conceptualisation of Tokyo Underground Railway ===
In 1914, Hayakawa embarked on a tour of Europe and North America to study rail and port infrastructure, during which he was struck by London's underground railways. He became convinced that in order to grow into a world-class city, Tokyo needed its own underground; the main mode of urban transport in Tokyo then came in the form of trams, which was suffering from congestion due to heavy traffic. “The congestion of tramways can be neutralized only by the establishment of high-speed railways — namely, elevated railways or underground railways,” Hayakawa said in an interview in August 1927 with The Japan Times & Mail (present-day The Japan Times), which described him as “the man through whose initiative and ability the problem of traffic congestion in Tokyo will be solved.” Hayakawa subsequently spent another two years studying subways in Europe and the North America.

After he returned to Japan, Hayakawa began drawing up plans for his proposed railway. The challenges were myriad, ranging from soft and groundwater-saturated water, lack of subway experience among local engineers and the astronomical cost of ¥6.2 million (approximately ¥3.7 billion as of 2017). Hayakawa and his supporters established the Tokyo Underground Railway Co. in 1920 and began lobbying the city government, business leaders, railway experts and foreign visitors for investment.

Meanwhile, Hayakawa set about determining the course of the future subway by surveying the burgeoning metropolis at the ground level. For six months, in rain and shine, he walked the streets of Asakusa, Ginza and Shimbashi and took note of the passing pedestrians, rickshaws, trams, cars and trucks. To determine the most crowded intersections, he had his wife prepare a supply of white and black beans. When he saw a pedestrian go by, he put a white bean in his left pocket. When an automobile drove by, he put a black bean in his right pocket. The left pocket soon bulged, and through this one-man survey Hayakawa was able to get a rough idea of where people were congregating in the metropolis. The most congested — and, therefore, potentially profitable — parts of Tokyo would serve as the subway's route. An initial plan to build from Ueno to Shinbashi, already a rail hub, was scrapped in favor of a line from Ueno to Asakusa, the bustling entertainment district surrounding Sensoji Temple. On Sept. 30, however, disaster struck in the form of the Great Kanto Earthquake, which left more than 105,000 dead and devastated the city. The company's investors balked, its stock slumped and it was forced to suspend business.

=== Tokyo Underground Railway materialises ===
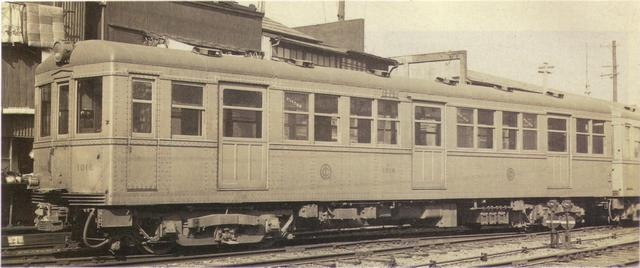
The original rolling stock of the Tokyo Underground Railway

On 27 September 1925, construction finally began on a 2.2-km tunnel running between Ueno and Asakusa, which was referred to by the name Kaminarimon, the iconic gate of Sensoji Temple. Okura Doboku, the forerunner of the present-day Taisei Corporation, was tasked with the job. Its elderly founder Kihachiro Okura insisted that it be built by Japanese workers, but at least one German engineer was recruited. Construction cost ¥4 million per mile (approximately ¥2.4 billion as of 2017). After several delays, the underground line finally opened on 30 December 1927 as the first subway in East Asia.

Hayakawa's line proved a success and Hayakawa earned praise from the residents of Tokyo for his hard work and the consequence to that. He already had a plan to extend the line to penetrate the entire city and several more lines. People around the city supported his movement. However, his success did not last long.

=== Competition ===
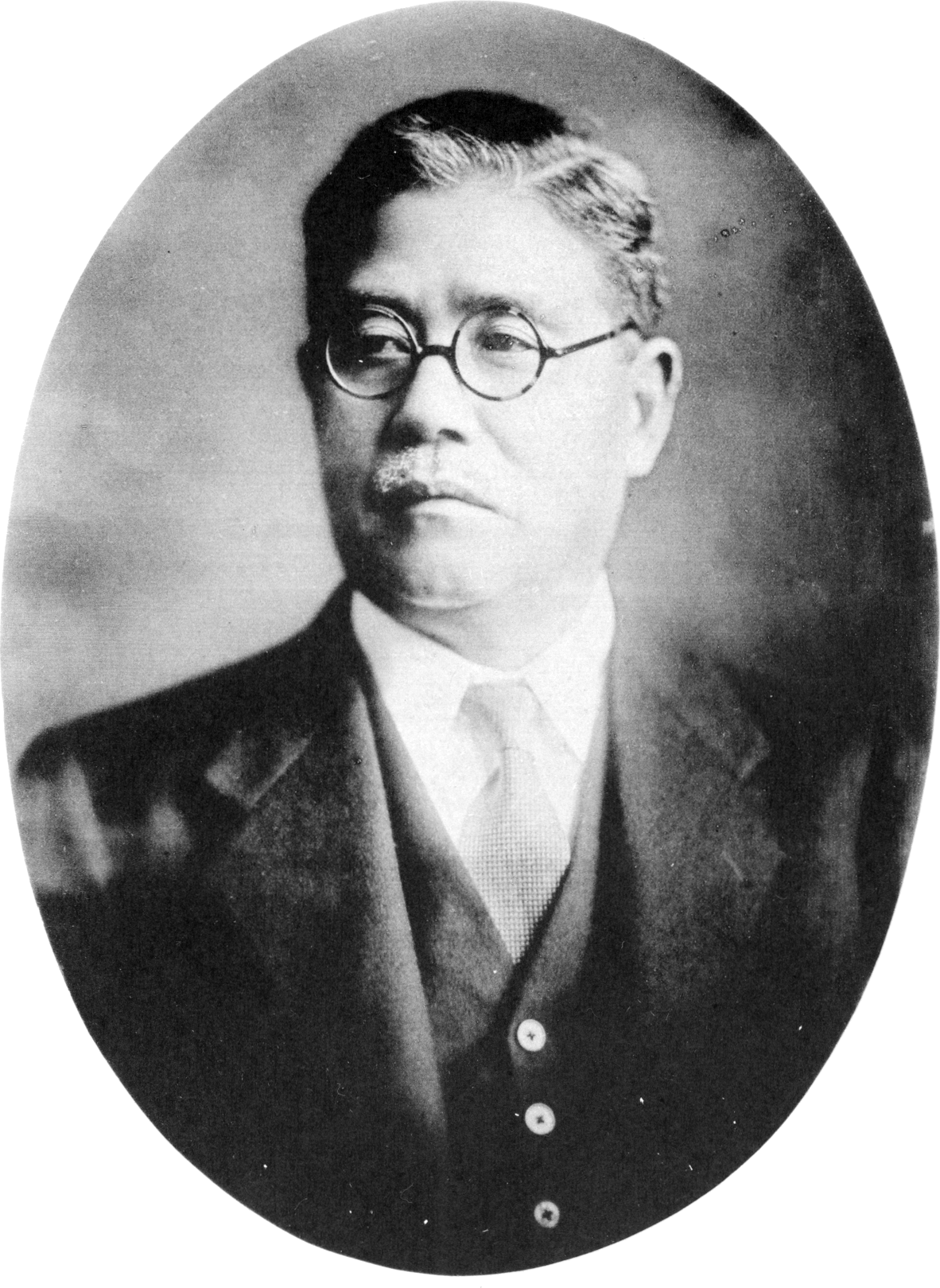
Keita Gotō (1882-1959)

A key rival to Hayakawa was Keita Goto of Tokyu Corporation, who sought for greater dominance over Tokyo's railways. Goto in particular eyed on the planned corridors for the Tokyo Underground Railway. Goto built his own line from Shimbashi to Shibuya, which is almost exactly where Hayakawa was planning to extend his line and blocked Hayakawa's project. First, Goto sought to cooperate with Hayakawa. Hayakawa wanted to build his train line through Toranomon, circle through the imperial palace and back to Tokyo Station, like the mirrored letter “C”. However, Goto, who had already built his railway business in Shibuya, opposed Hayakawa's idea and launched a corporate raid on Tokyo Underground Railway, buying 450000 shares of Hayakawa's company and causing Hayakawa to be evicted from his own company. However, the Japanese government subsequently took over both Goto's Tokyo Rapid Railway and the Tokyo Underground Railway and merged them in 1941 to form the Teito Rapid Transit Authority.

=== Later life and death ===
After the hostile takeover of the Tokyo Underground Railway, Hayakawa returned to his hometown at Yamanashi. Hayakawa had planned to build a youth dōjō there to develop talent in his hometown. Upon his return, progress on the dojo went under way. However, Hayakawa never lived to see the completion of the dojo as he died in 1942 at an age of 61.

== Legacy ==
A bronze bust of him is erected at a promenade in Ginza Station. A similar bust is also located at the Tokyo Metro Museum at Kasai Station.
