= Ginza Station =

Metro station in Tokyo, Japan

Coordinates: 35.67123°N 139.76500°E

Ginza Station 銀座駅

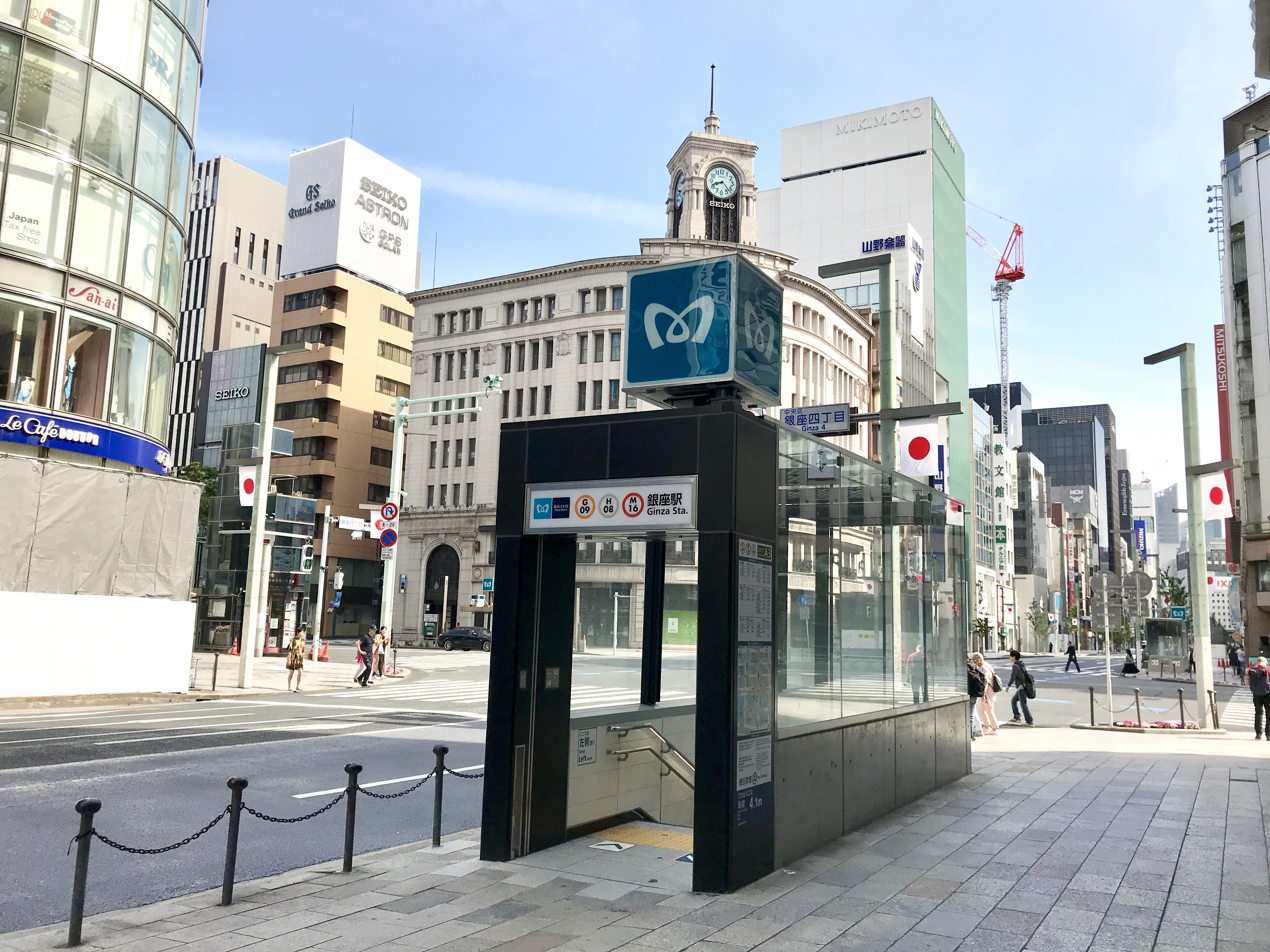
- ExitA3 and Wako

General information
- Location: 4-1-2 Ginza, Chuo City, Tokyo; Japan
- System: Tokyo subway
- Owner: Tokyo Metro Co., Ltd.
- Operator: Tokyo Metro
- Platforms: 3 island platforms (1 for each line)
- Tracks: 6 (2 for each line)
- Connections: Ginza-itchōme Station Higashi-Ginza Station

Construction
- Structure type: Underground
- Accessible: Yes

Other information
- Station code: G-09, M-16, H-09
- Website: www.tokyometro.jp/lang_en/station/ginza/index.html

History
- Opened: 3 March 1934; 92 years ago

Passengers
- FY2019: 257,440 daily

Services
Preceding station	Tokyo Metro	Following station
Shimbashi towards Shibuya	Ginza Line	Kyōbashi towards Asakusa
Kasumigaseki towards Ebisu	TH Liner	Kayabachō towards Kuki
Hibiya towards Naka-meguro	Hibiya Line	Higashi-ginza towards Kita-Senju
Kasumigaseki towards Ogikubo or Hōnanchō	Marunouchi Line	Tokyo towards Ikebukuro
Location
- Location within Tokyo Yamanote Loop Location within Tokyo wards area Location within Japan

Ginza Station (銀座駅, Ginza-eki) is a subway station in Chūō, Tokyo, Japan, operated by the Tokyo subway operator Tokyo Metro. It serves the Ginza commercial district, and is the fourth-busiest Tokyo Metro station after Ikebukuro, Ōtemachi, and Kita-senju.

== History ==
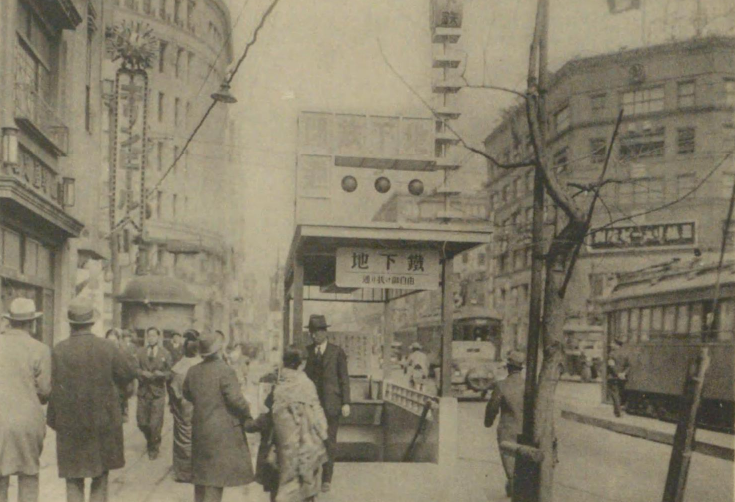
ExitA2 in the 1930s

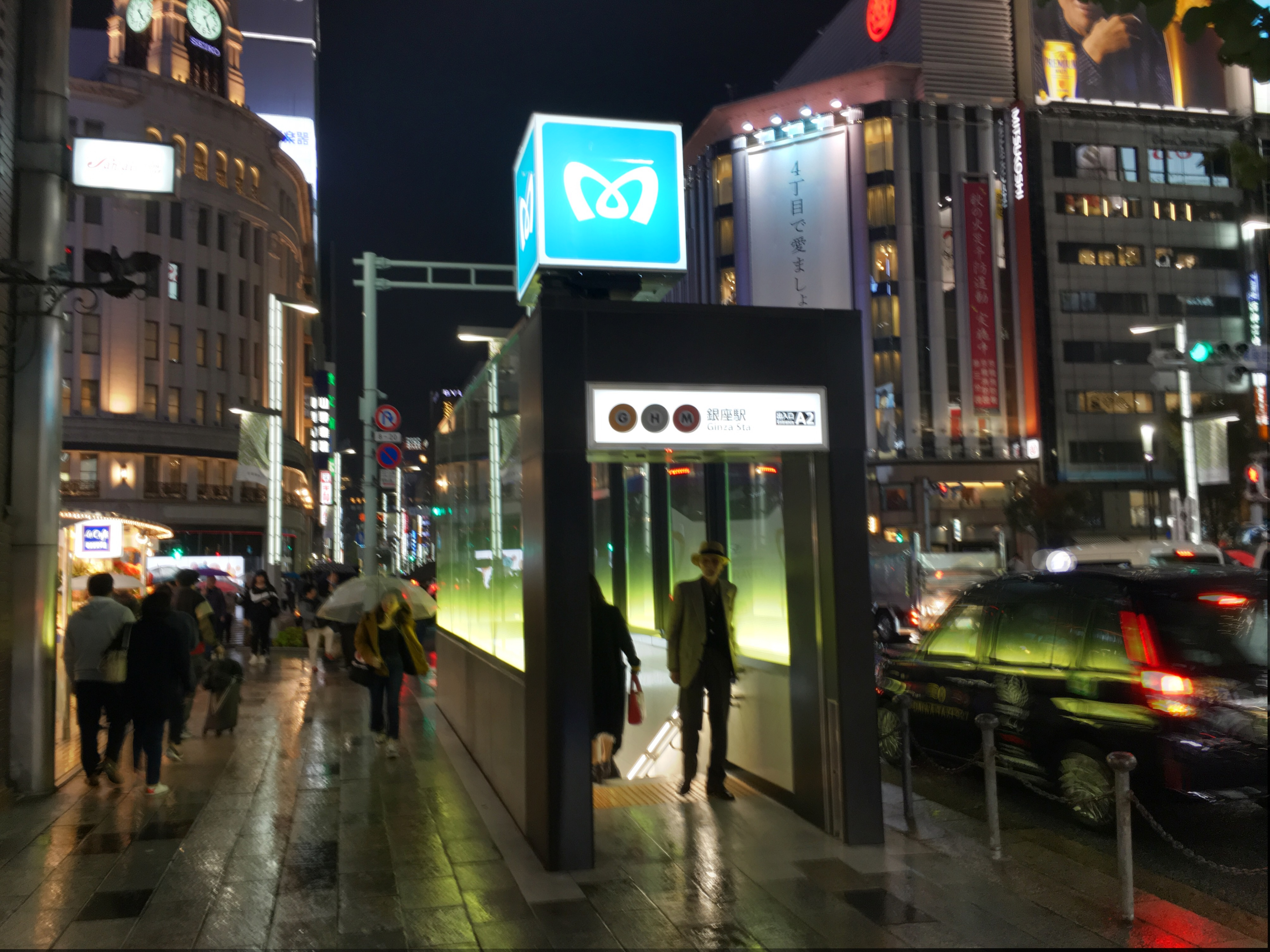
ExitA2 today

Ginza Station opened by the Tokyo Underground Railway on 3 March 1934. The Marunouchi Line began service to Ginza on 15 December 1957, and the Hibiya Line platforms were opened on 29 August 1964 by the Teito Rapid Transit Authority (TRTA).

The station facilities were inherited by Tokyo Metro after the privatization of the Teito Rapid Transit Authority (TRTA) in 2004.

TH Liner services on the Hibiya Line between Ebisu and Kuki commenced on 6 June 2020.

== Lines ==
Ginza Station is served by the following three Tokyo Metro lines.

- Tokyo Metro Ginza Line (G-09)
- Tokyo Metro Marunouchi Line (M-16)
- Tokyo Metro Hibiya Line (H-09)

== Station layout ==
Each line has an island platform serving two tracks. The Ginza and Marunouchi Line platforms are located separately on the 2nd basement (B2F) level, while the Hibiya Line platforms are located on the 3rd basement (B3F) level.

=== Platforms ===
1	Ginza Line	for Akasaka-mitsuke, Omote-sando, and Shibuya
2	Ginza Line	for Nihombashi, Ueno, and Asakusa
3	Marunouchi Line	for Yotsuya, Shinjuku, Ogikubo, and Hōnanchō
4	Marunouchi Line	for Otemachi, Korakuen, and Ikebukuro
5	Hibiya Line	for Roppongi and Naka-meguro
6	Hibiya Line	for Ueno and Kita-senju; Tobu Skytree Line for Tōbu-Dōbutsu-Kōen; Tobu Nikko Line for Minami-Kurihashi

The song "Ginza Kankan Musume" (銀座カンカン娘, Ginza Kankan Musume) by Ryōichi Hattori is used as the departure melody on the Ginza Line platforms in 2012.

The song "The Love Story of Ginza" (銀座の恋の物語, Ginza no Koi no Monogatari) by Yujiro Ishihara and Junko Makimura is used as the departure melody on the Hibiya Line platforms in 2016.

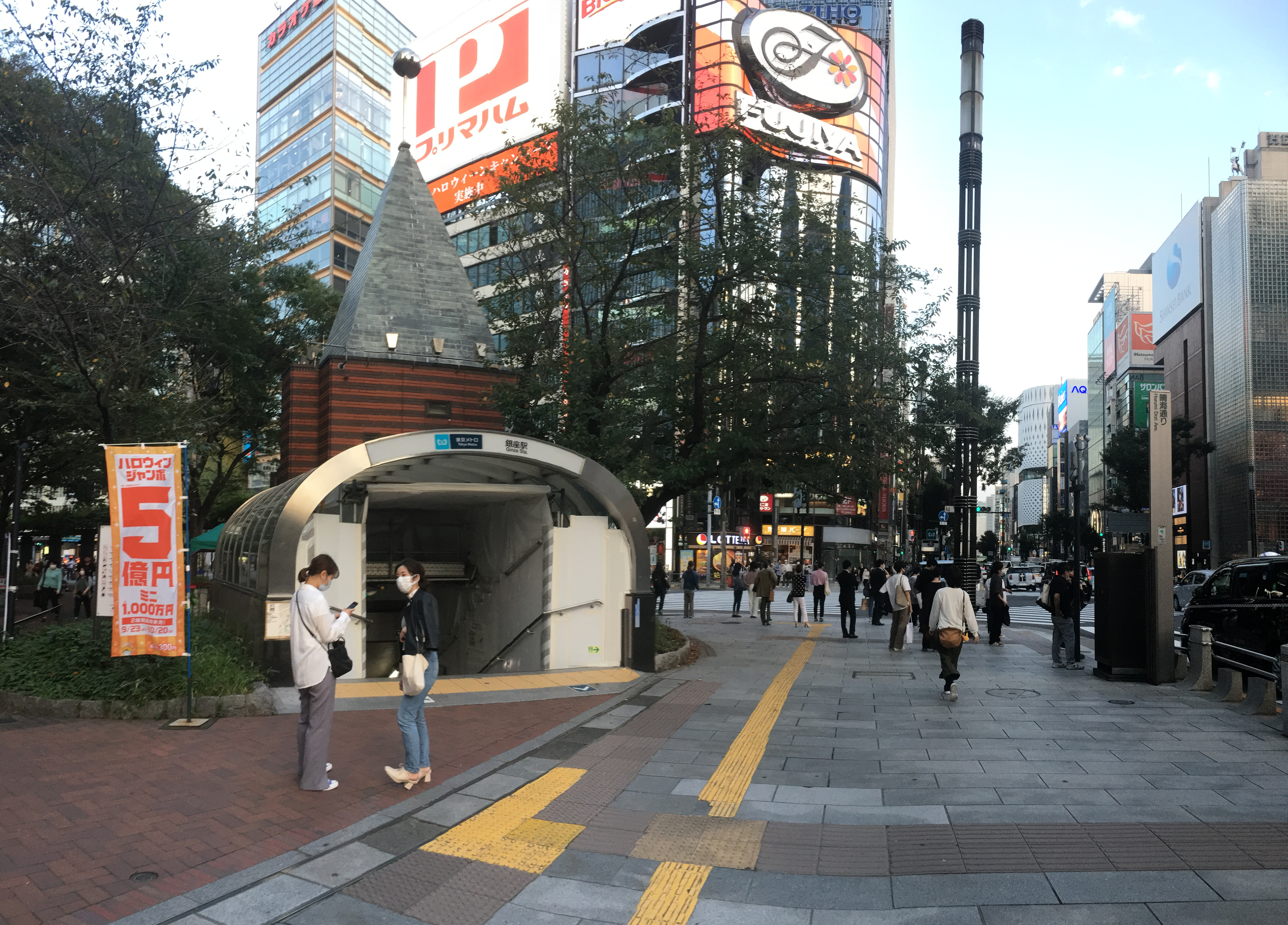
Entry to Ginza Metro station at Sukiyabashi intersection, 2020

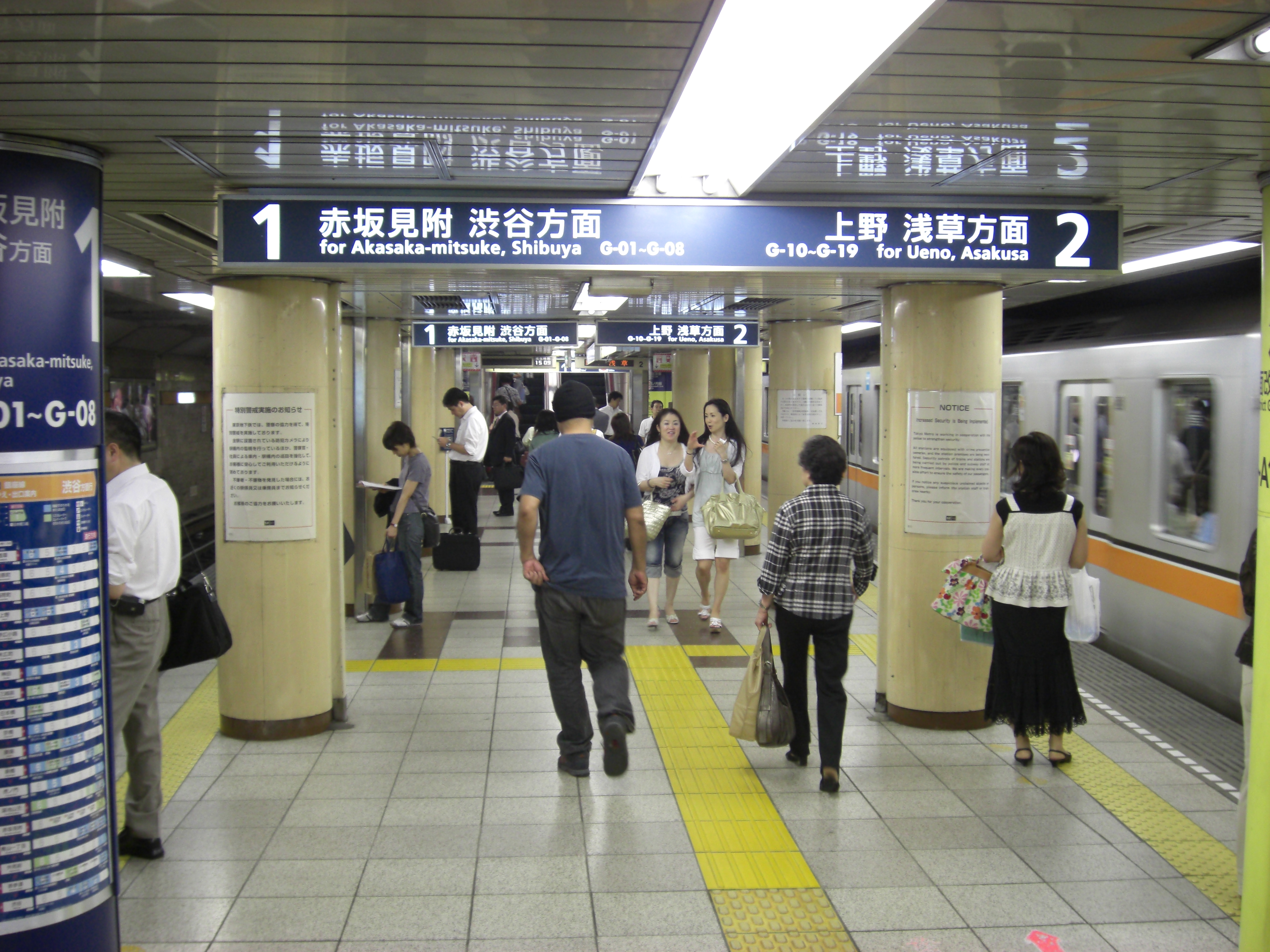
Ginza Line platforms before platform screen doors were installed, 2007

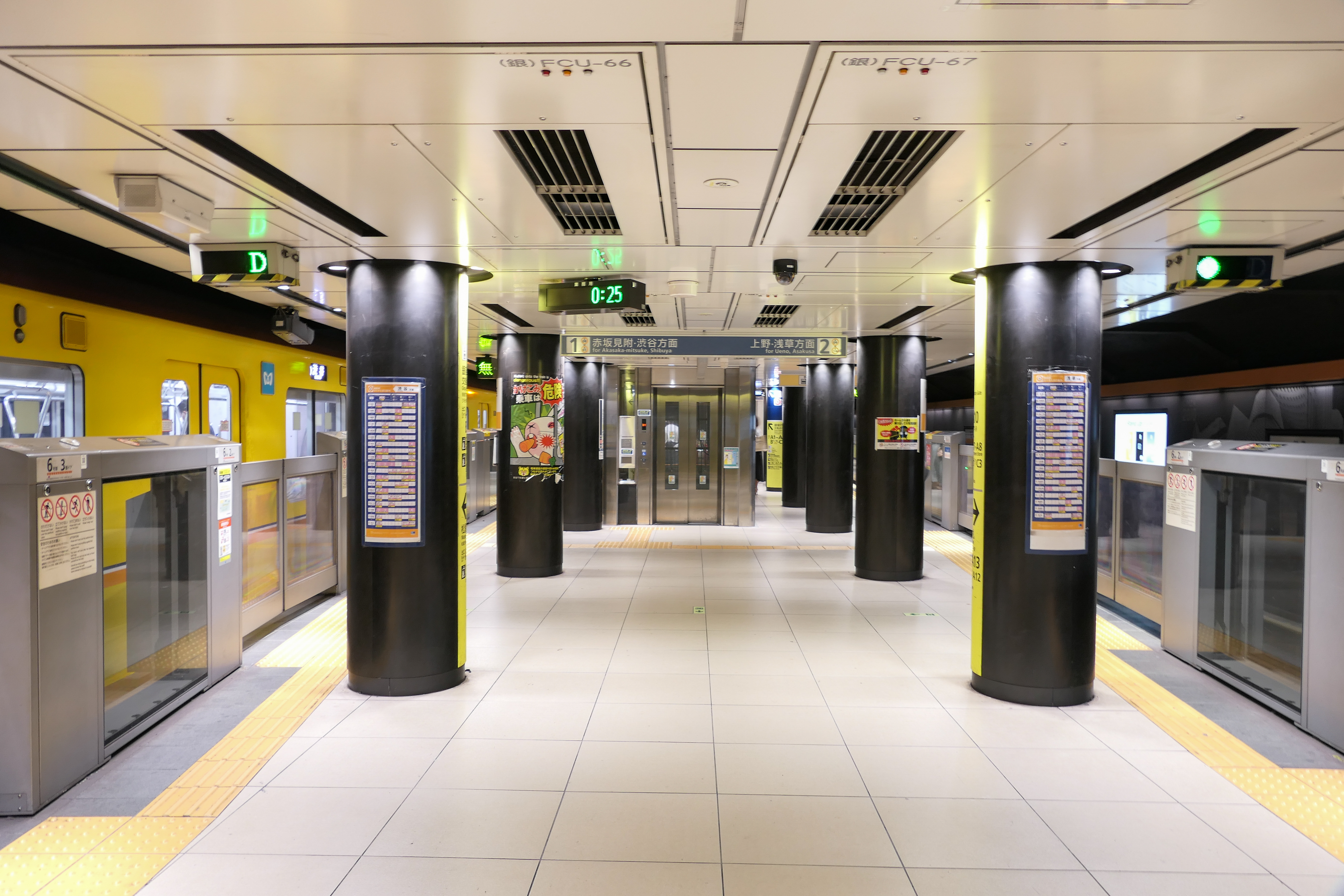
Ginza Line platform, 2023

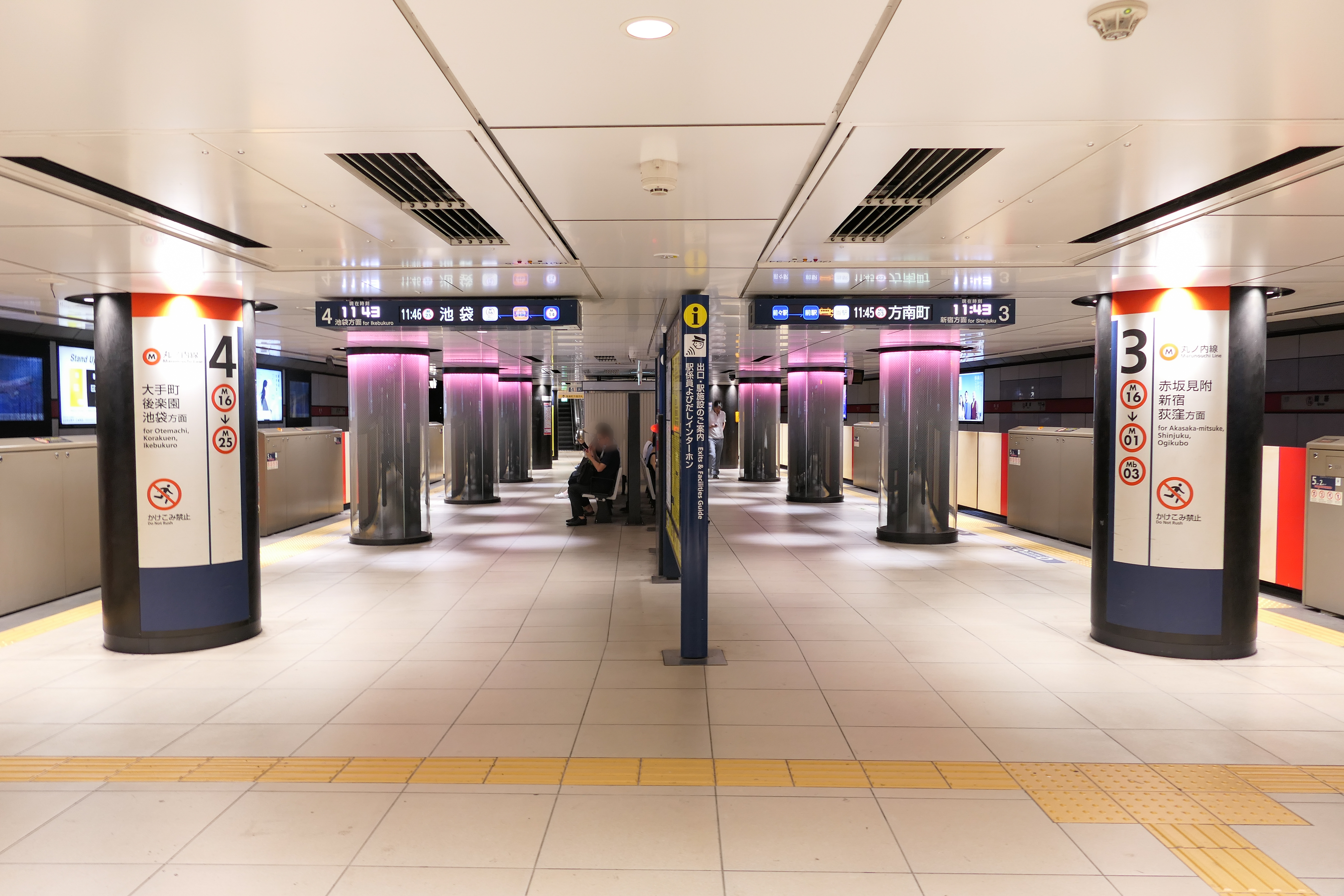
Marunouchi Line platforms, 2023

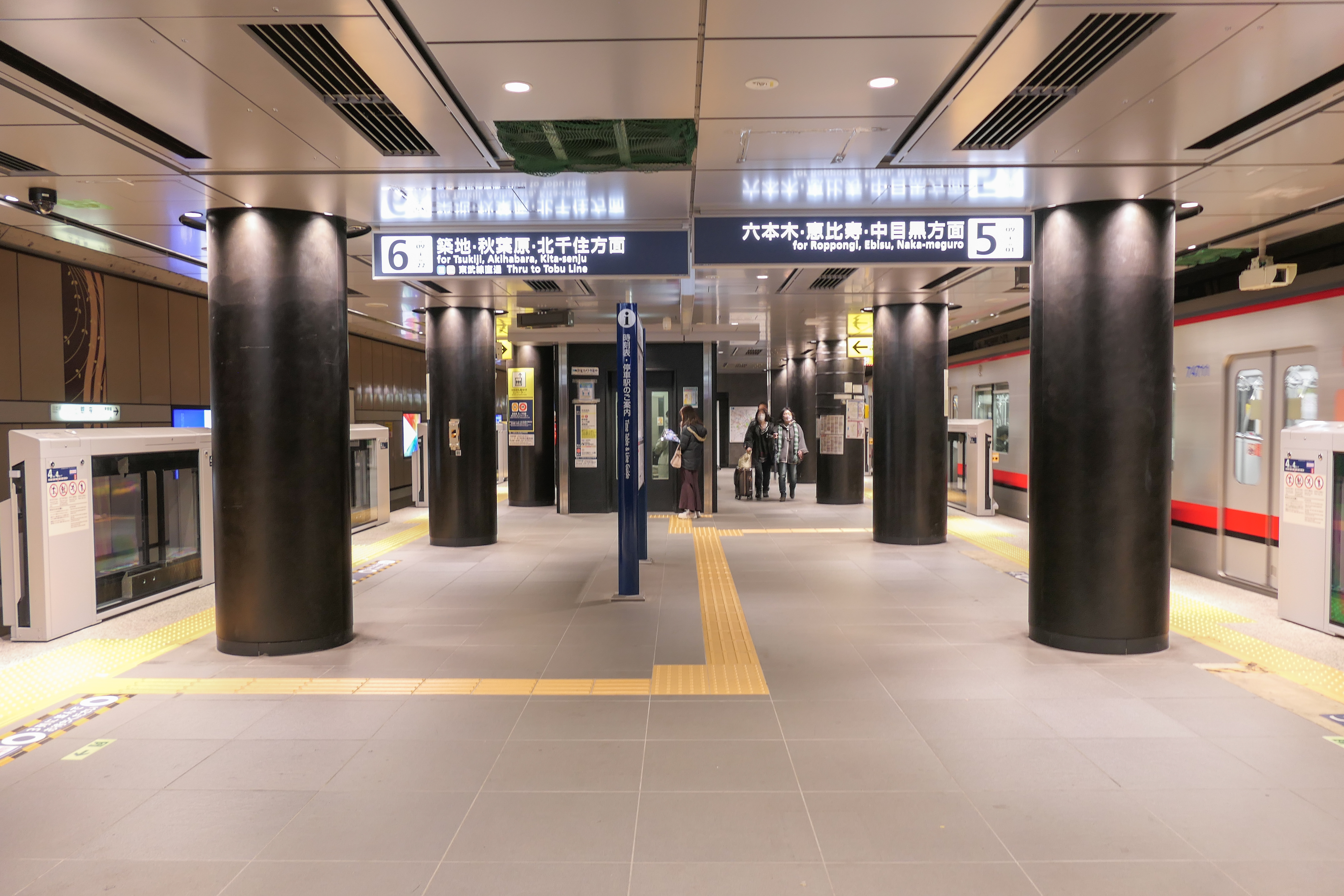
Hibiya Line platforms, 2022

== Passenger statistics ==
In fiscal 2019, the station was used by an average of 257,440 passengers daily.

== Surrounding area ==
An underground passage connects with the following stations, allowing transfer on foot. Ginza-itchōme is the official transfer station, the others are not.

- Ginza-itchōme (Tokyo Metro Yūrakuchō Line)
- Higashi-Ginza (Tokyo Metro Hibiya Line, Toei Asakusa Line)
- Hibiya (Tokyo Metro Hibiya Line, Tokyo Metro Chiyoda Line, Toei Mita Line)
- Yūrakuchō (Tokyo Metro Yūrakuchō Line, Yamanote Line, Keihin-Tōhoku Line)
