= Ginza Line =

Subway line in Tokyo, Japan

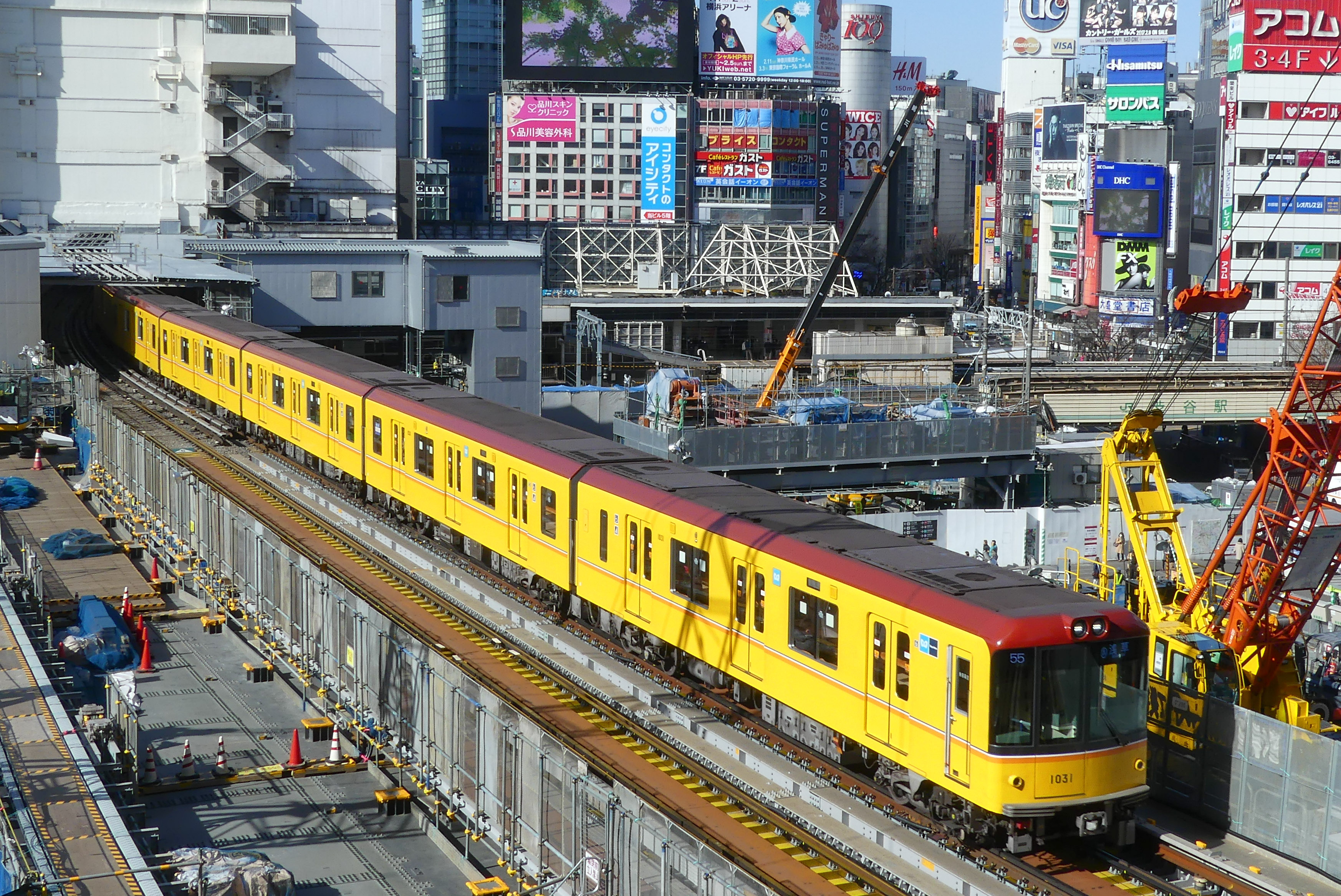
- A Ginza Line 1000 series train at Shibuya Station

Overview
- Other name: Line 3
- Native name: 銀座線
- Status: In service
- Owner: Tokyo Metro Co., Ltd.
- Line number: G
- Locale: Tokyo
- Termini: Shibuya; Asakusa
- Stations: 19
- Color on map: Orange

Service
- Type: Rapid transit
- System: Tokyo subway (Tokyo Metro)
- Operator(s): Tokyo Metro Co., Ltd.
- Depot(s): Shibuya, Ueno
- Rolling stock: Tokyo Metro 1000 series (6 cars)
- Daily ridership: 943,606 (2017)

History
- Opened: 30 December 1927; 98 years ago
- Last extension: 1939

Technical
- Line length: 14.3 km (8.9 mi)
- Num of tracks: 2
- Track gauge: 1,435 mm (4 ft 8 1/2 in) standard gauge
- Minimum radius: 94 m (309 ft)
- Electrification: Third rail, 600 V DC
- Operating speed: 65 km/h (40 mph)
- Train protection system: New CS-ATC
- Maximum incline: 3.3%
Route map
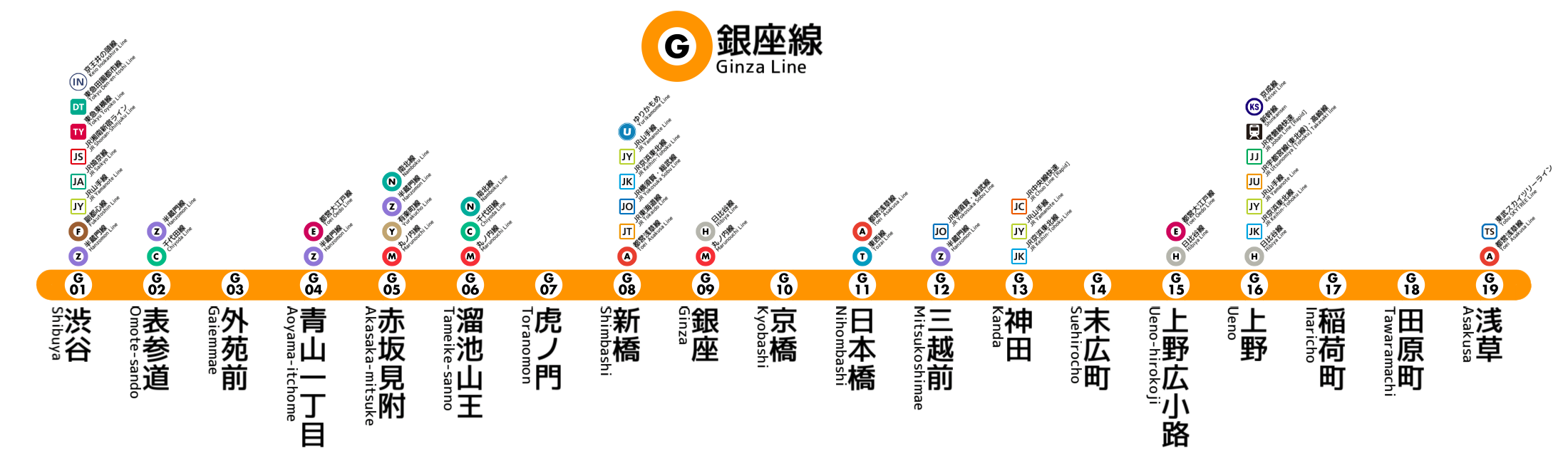

The Ginza Line (銀座線, Ginza-sen), officially designated as Line 3 Ginza Line (3号線銀座線, San-gō-sen Ginza-sen), is a subway line in Tokyo, Japan, operated by Tokyo Metro. The line spans 14.3 km (8.9 mi) and serves the wards of Shibuya, Minato, Chūō, Chiyoda, and Taitō.

It is the oldest subway line in Asia, opening in 1927 and originally operated by the Tokyo Underground Railway, later jointly operated with the Tokyo Rapid Railway.

The line is named after the Ginza commercial district in Chūō Ward, through which it passes. On maps, diagrams, and signage, the line is color-coded orange, and its stations are identified by the letter "G" followed by a specific number.

== Operations ==
Nearly all Ginza Line trains operate along the full length of the line between Asakusa and Shibuya. However, two early-morning trains originate at Toranomon, and several evening and late-night trains from Shibuya terminate at Ueno. Along with the Marunouchi Line, the Ginza Line is a self-contained system with no through service operations to other railway lines.

On weekdays, the line maintains a headway of 2 minutes and 15 seconds during morning and evening peak periods, and 5 minutes during the day. The first trains depart from Shibuya and Asakusa at 05:01; the final services reach Shibuya at 00:28 and Asakusa at 00:24.

== History ==
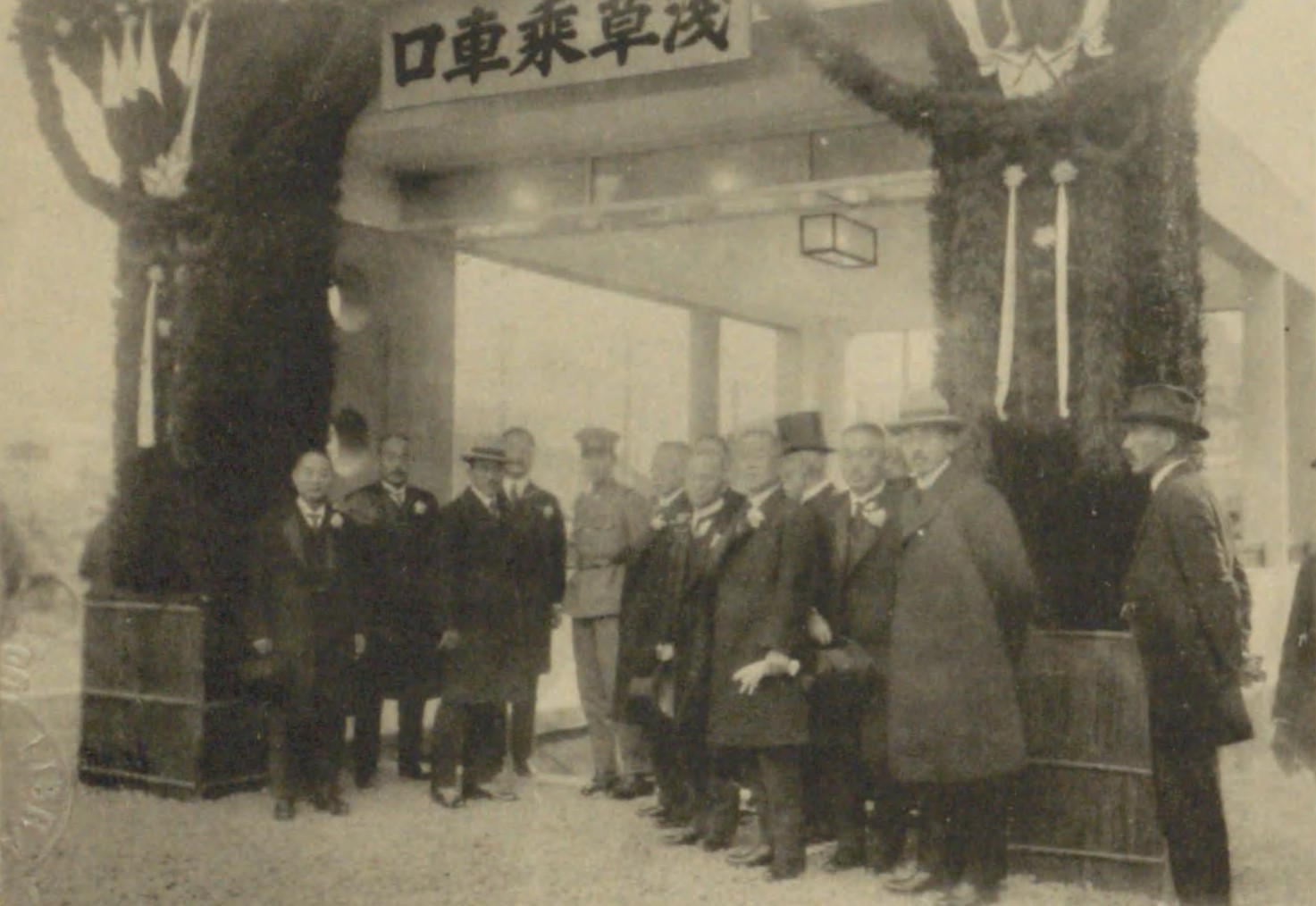
Asakusa station at the opening ceremony of Tokyo Underground Railway on December 29, 1927.

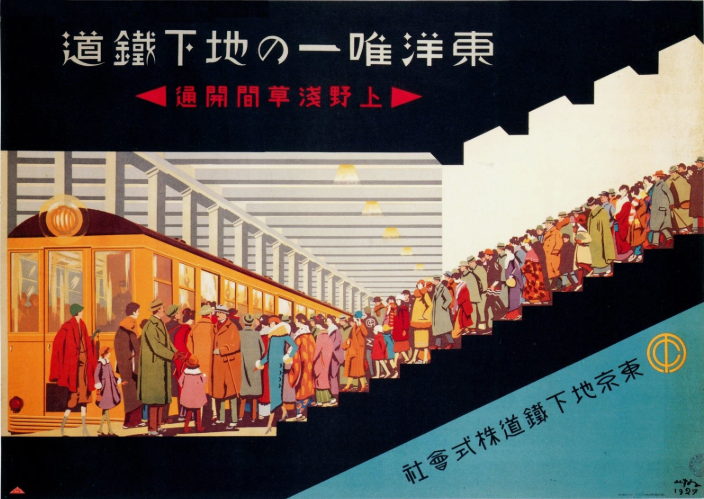
Advertising poster promoting the opening of the line in 1927.

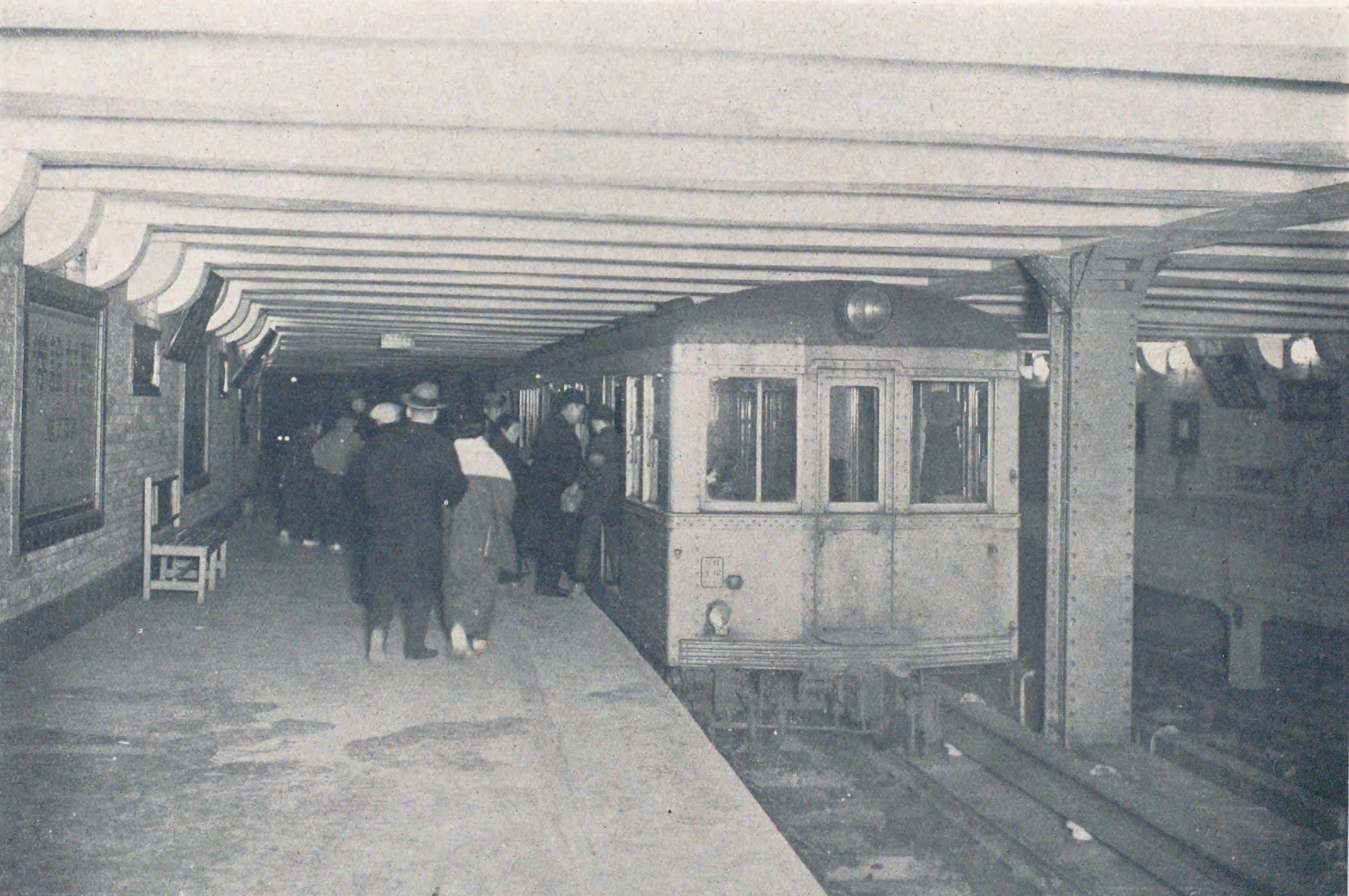
Ginza Line in the 1920s, with a Nomura Securities advert on the wall

The Ginza Line was conceived by businessman Noritsugu Hayakawa, who, after observing the London Underground during a 1914 visit, concluded that Tokyo City required its own subterranean railway. In 1920, he co-founded the Tokyo Underground Railway (東京地下鉄道) alongside Baron Furuichi Kōi. Construction began on September 27, 1925, following the procurement of ¥6.2 mil ($25k) toward the project's initial ¥35 mil ($145k) funding requirement.

Originally, the Ginza Line was proposed to open from Shimbashi to Asakusa all at once, but because of a recession following the Great Kanto Earthquake (1923), it became difficult to raise funds for the line. The portion between Ueno and Asakusa was completed on December 30, 1927. Upon its opening, the line was so popular that passengers often had to wait more than two hours to ride a train for a five-minute trip.

On January 1, 1930, the subway was extended by 1.7 km (1.1 mi) to temporary Manseibashi Station, abandoned on November 21, 1931 when the subway reached Kanda, 500 meters (1,600 ft) further south down the line. The Great Depression slowed down construction, but the line finally reached its originally planned terminus of Shimbashi on June 21, 1934.

In 1938, the Tokyo Rapid Railway (東京高速鉄道), a company tied to the predecessor of today's Tokyu Corporation, began service between Shibuya and Toranomon, later extended to Shimbashi in 1939. The two lines began through-service interoperation in 1939 and were formally merged as the Teito Rapid Transit Authority ("Eidan Subway" or "TRTA") in July 1941 in accordance with the Land Transport Business Coordination Law, related to the State General Mobilization Law.

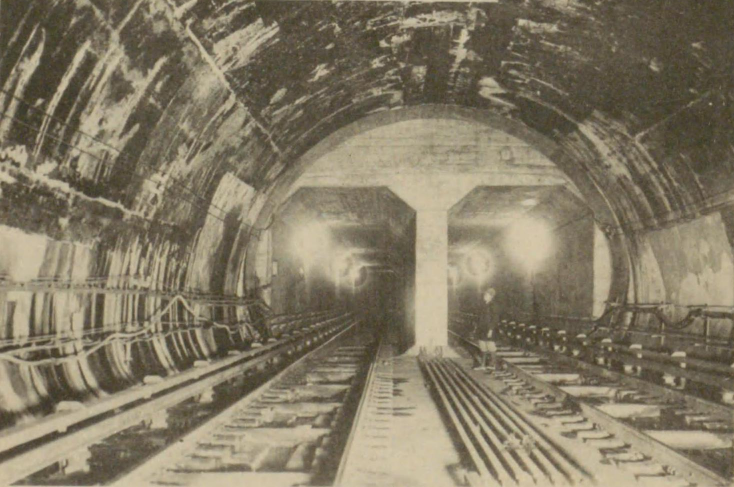
Tunnel near Manseibashi Station in the 1930s

=== Wartime operations ===
For a period after the outbreak of the World War II in December 1941, mainland Japan was largely spared significant war damage, with the exception of the Doolittle Raid on April 18, 1942. Economic activity increased, leading to a rise in demand for rail transport. To accommodate the increased capacity needs, all trains were standardized to three-car formations starting December 31, 1942.

However, intensifying warfare led to severe power shortages. Consequently, from January 19, 1943, measures such as shortening the operating routes of some trains operating only between Mitsukoshimae Station and Shibuya Station and suspending service on holidays were implemented. The continued deterioration of the power supply and a decrease in the number of operable electric cars due to vehicle part shortages resulted in a further series of speed reductions and a decrease in train frequency.

Towards the end of the WWII, Tokyo endured repeated bombings by the US military during the Great Tokyo Air Raids. The Ginza Line, having minimal soil cover, was forced to suspend service during each air raid. Due to the lack of overground coverage, it was not utilized as an air raid shelter, unlike other subway lines such as the Midosuji Line in Osaka.

During the air raid on January 27, 1945, a bomb struck Ginza Street (now Chūō Street), causing damage to both Ginza Station and Kyōbashi Station and resulting in numerous passenger fatalities. Additionally, a burst water pipe flooded the tunnel between Nihonbashi Station and Shimbashi Station. Service was consequently rerouted, operating between Asakusa Station and Mitsukoshimae Station, and between Shimbashi Station and Shibuya Station. On February 1, single-track service resumed between Shimbashi and Mitsukoshimae stations, with full line restoration achieved by March 10. On May 25, a bomb hit the Shibuya Inspection Yard, burning five carriages which were later repaired and returned to service.

=== Postwar period ===
By June 1, only 24 of the fleet's 84 cars remained operational. Due to depopulation in the areas surrounding the stations caused by the air raids, trains were treated as passing through Tawaramachi Station and Suehirochō Station during limited hours until October 14, 1946.

The "Ginza Line" name was applied in 1953 to distinguish the line from the new Marunouchi Line. In the postwar economic boom, the Ginza Line became increasingly crowded. The new Hanzōmon Line began to relieve the Ginza Line's traffic in the 1980s, but the Ginza Line is still quite crowded as it serves major residential, commercial, and business districts in central Tokyo. According to a 2018 release of Tokyo Metropolitan Bureau of Transportation, the Ginza Line is the seventh most crowded subway line in Tokyo, running at 160% capacity between Akasaka-mitsuke and Tameike-sannō stations.

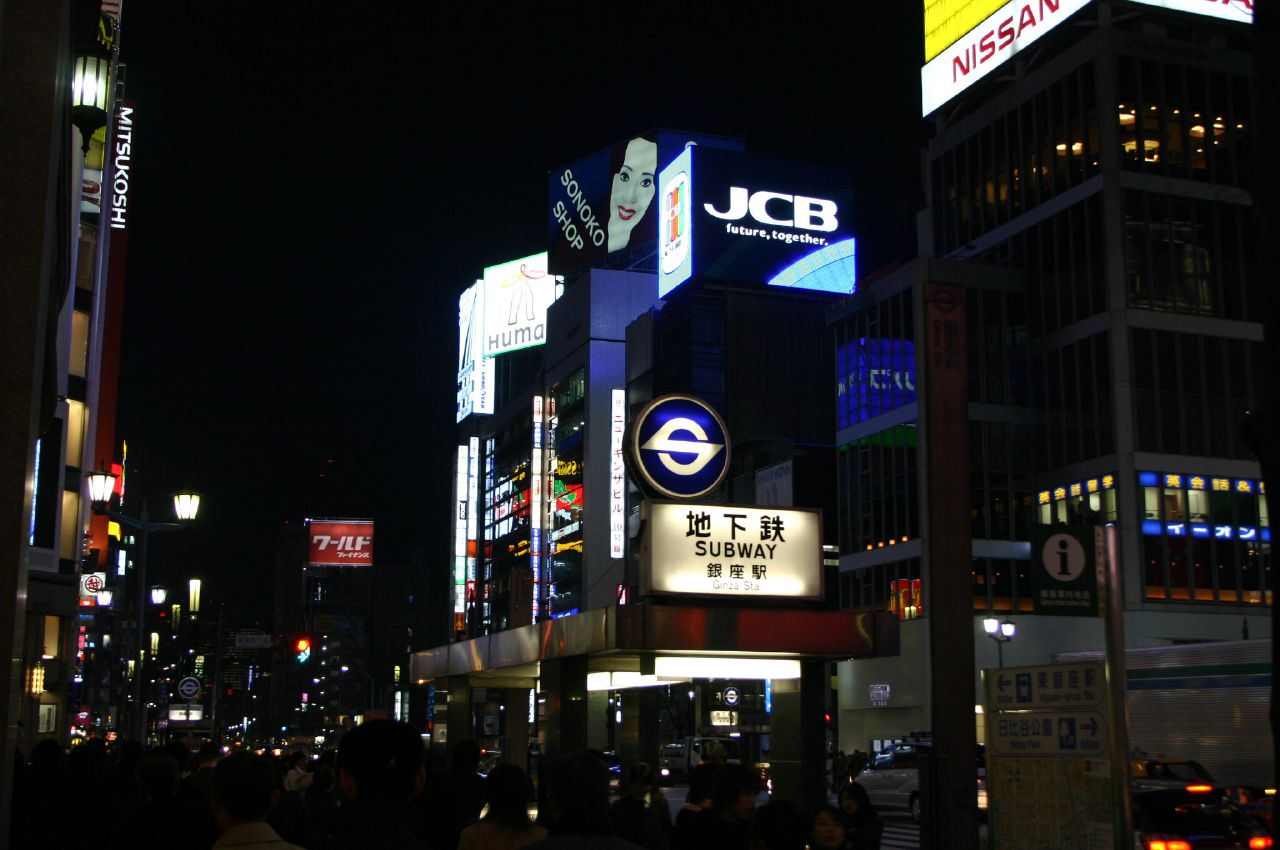
Ginza Station Exit in 2004, shortly before rebranding from TRTA to Tokyo Metro.

Automatic train control (ATC) and train automatic stopping controller (TASC) were activated on the Ginza Line on July 31, 1993, replacing the previous mechanical automatic train stop (ATS) system. This allowed for an increase in the maximum operating speed limit from 55 km/h (34 mph) to 65 km/h (40 mph), which came into effect on August 2, 1993, and hence enabled a corresponding increase in the line's route capacity and train frequency. The newest station on the line, Tameike-sannō Station, opened in 1997 to provide a connection to the newly built Namboku Line.

The line, station facilities, rolling stock, and related assets were inherited by Tokyo Metro after the privatization of the Teito Rapid Transit Authority (TRTA) in 2004.

== Stations ==
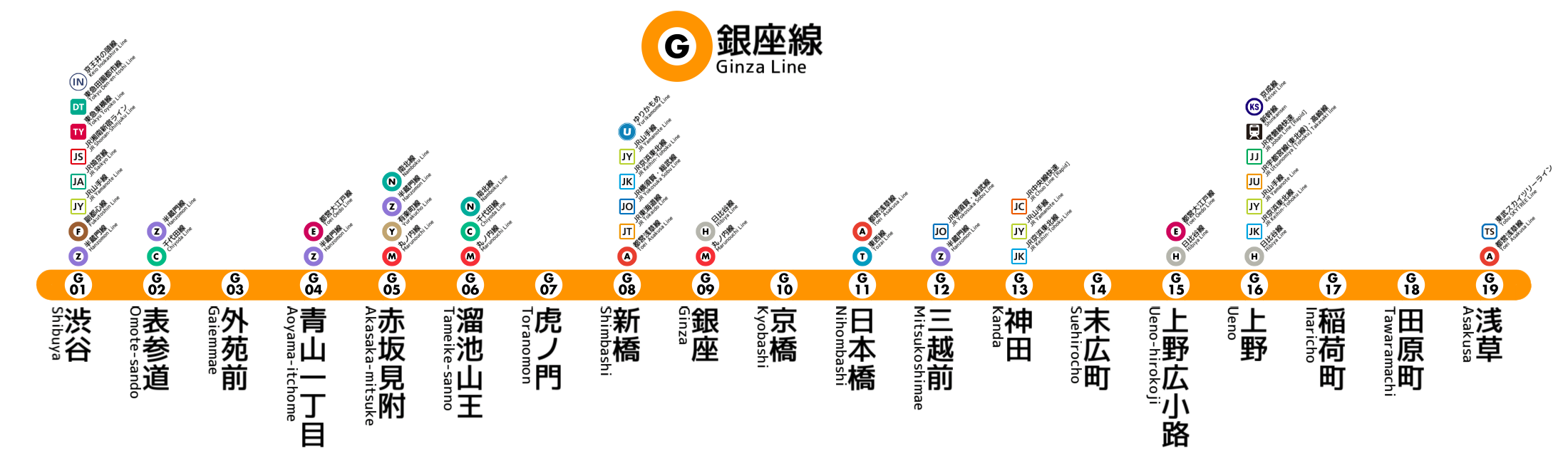
List of Ginza line stations

- All stations are located in Tokyo.

Being the oldest line on the Tokyo Metro, stations are also the closest to the surface—generally no more than one and a half stories underground. The western end of the line enters Shibuya Station located on the third-floor of a building that is located in a depression.

No.	Station	Japanese	Distance (km)		Transfers	Ward
No.	Station	Japanese	Between stations	From Shibuya	Transfers	Ward
G-01	Shibuya	渋谷	-	0.0	Hanzōmon Line (Z-01); Fukutoshin Line (F-16); Yamanote Line (JY20); Saikyō Line (JA10); Shōnan–Shinjuku Line (JS19); Den-en-toshi Line (DT01); Tōyoko Line (TY01); Inokashira Line (IN01)	Shibuya
G-02	Omote-sandō	表参道	1.3	1.3	Chiyoda Line (C-04); Hanzōmon Line (Z-02) (Note: Due to the distance between the Ginza and Hanzomon/Den-en-toshi lines at Shibuya, transfers between the two lines are announced at Omotesandō.)	Minato
G-03	Gaiemmae	外苑前	0.7	2.0		Minato
G-04	Aoyama-itchōme	青山一丁目	0.7	2.7	Hanzōmon Line (Z-03); Ōedo Line (E-24)	Minato
G-05	Akasaka-mitsuke	赤坂見附	1.3	4.0	Marunouchi Line (M-13); Yūrakuchō Line (Nagatacho: Y-16); Hanzōmon Line (Nagatacho: Z-04); Namboku Line (Nagatacho: N-07)	Minato
G-06	Tameike-sannō	溜池山王	0.9	4.9	Marunouchi Line (Kokkai-gijidomae: M-14); Chiyoda Line (Kokkai-gijidomae: C-07); Namboku Line (N-06)	Chiyoda
G-07	Toranomon	虎ノ門	0.6	5.5	Hibiya Line (Toranomon Hills: H-06)	Minato
G-08	Shimbashi	新橋	0.8	6.3	Asakusa Line (A-10); Mita Line (Uchisaiwaicho: I-07); Yamanote Line (JY29); Keihin–Tōhoku Line (JK24); Tōkaidō Line (JT02); Yokosuka Line (JO18); Yurikamome (U-01)	Minato
G-09	Ginza	銀座	0.9	7.2	Marunouchi Line (M-16); Hibiya Line (H-09); Yūrakuchō Line (Ginza-itchome: Y-19)	Chūō
G-10	Kyōbashi	京橋	0.7	7.9		Chūō
G-11	Nihombashi	日本橋	0.7	8.6	Tōzai Line (T-10); Asakusa Line (A-13)	Chūō
G-12	Mitsukoshimae	三越前	0.6	9.2	Hanzōmon Line (Z-09); Sōbu Line (Shin-Nihombashi: JO20)	Chūō
G-13	Kanda	神田	0.7	9.9	Marunouchi Line (Awajicho: M-19); Shinjuku Line (Ogawamachi: S-07); Yamanote Line (JY02); Keihin–Tōhoku Line (JK27); Chūō Line (JC02)	Chiyoda
G-14	Suehirocho	末広町	1.1	11.0		Chiyoda
G-15	Ueno-hirokoji	上野広小路	0.6	11.6	Hibiya Line (Naka-okachimachi: H-17); Chiyoda Line (Yushima: C-13); Ōedo Line (Ueno-okachimachi: E-09); Yamanote Line (Okachimachi: JY04); Keihin–Tōhoku Line (Okachimachi: JK29); Tsukuba Express (Shin-okachimachi: TX02)	Taitō
G-16	Ueno	上野	0.5	12.1	Hibiya Line (H-18); Tōhoku Shinkansen (Hokkaido, Akita, Yamagata); Jōetsu Shinkansen; Hokuriku Shinkansen; Yamanote Line (JY05); Keihin–Tōhoku Line (JK30); Ueno-Tokyo Line (JU02); Utsunomiya Line/Takasaki Line (JU02); Jōban Line (Rapid) (JJ01); Main Line (Keisei Ueno: KS01)	Taitō
G-17	Inarichō	稲荷町	0.7	12.8		Taitō
G-18	Tawaramachi	田原町	0.7	13.5	Tsukuba Express (Asakusa: TX03) (Note: Both stations are displayed on station maps as being distant from one another, and they are not announced as transfer points for one another.)	Taitō
G-19	Asakusa	浅草	0.8	14.3	Asakusa Line (A-18); Tobu Skytree Line (TS01)	Taitō

=== Ridership ===
Average daily ridership
Year	Ridership
1928	22,445
1930	27,512
1935	79,334
1952	317,745
1960	507,545
1965	574,039
1970	966,499
1975	597,200
1980	751,780
1985	808,773
1990	826,627
1995	745,992
2000	741,378
2005	727,071
2010	717,663
2015	772,841
2020	465,156
2024	707,098
Source: Tokyo Metropolitan Government

== Rolling stock ==
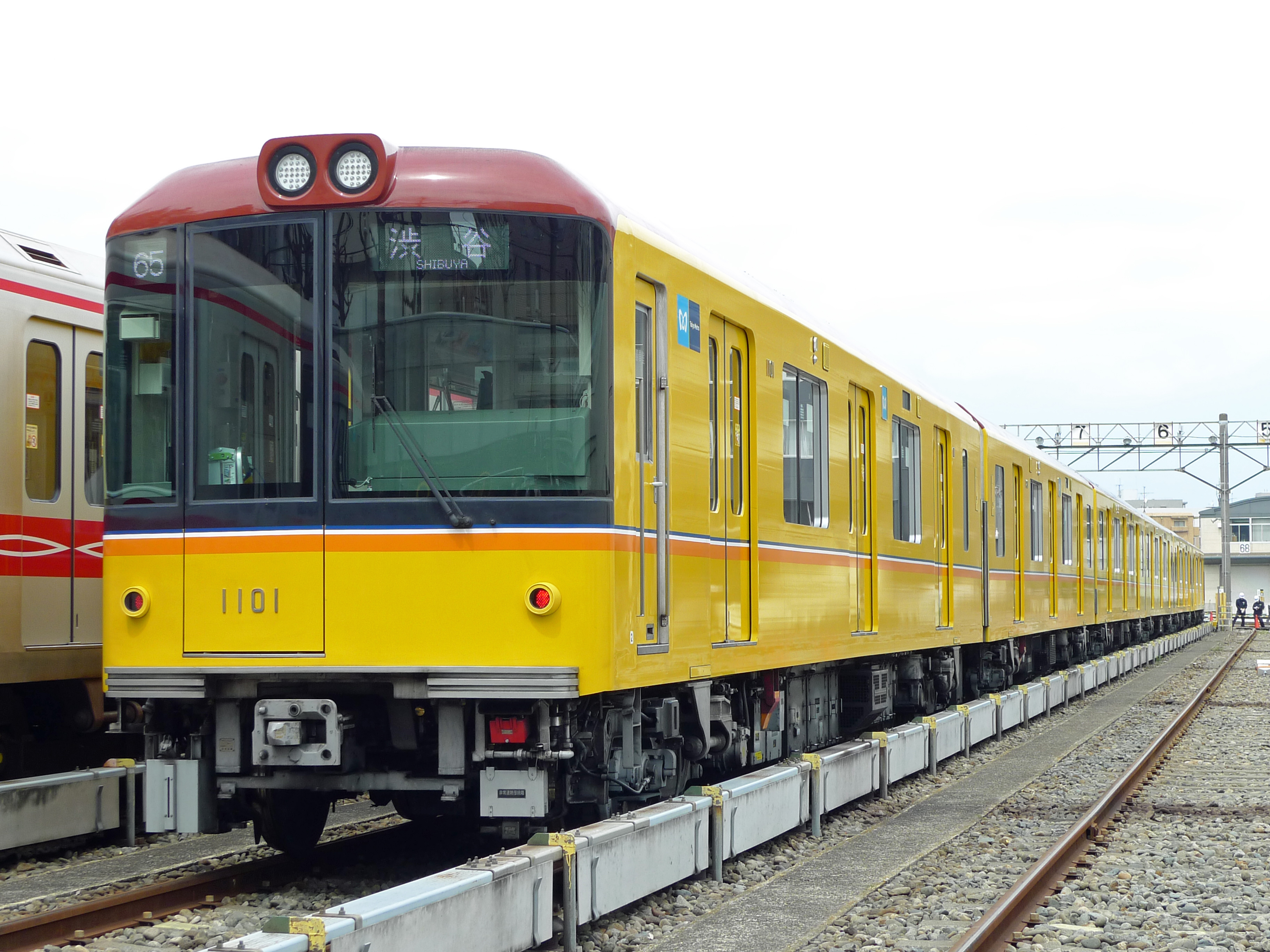
A Tokyo Metro 1000 series EMU in April 2013

Tokyo Metro Ginza Line trains coming and going during the reconstruction of Shibuya Station in 2017

Since April 2012, the Ginza Line uses a fleet of 40 six-car Tokyo Metro 1000 series EMUs which have a maximum speed of 80 km/h (50 mph). Each car is 16 m (52 ft 6 in) long and 2.55 m (8 ft 4 in) wide, with three doors on each side. They are powered by a third rail electrified at 600 V DC. Both the Ginza Line and the Marunouchi Line are the only Tokyo Metro lines to use 1,435 mm (4 ft 8 1/2 in) standard gauge and third rail electrification, while subsequent lines employ narrow gauge (1,067 mm (3 ft 6 in)) rails and 1,500 V DC overhead power supply to accommodate through services.

Cars are stored and inspected at Shibuya Depot located after Shibuya Station and at Ueno Inspection Division (上野検車区, Ueno-kensha-ku), a facility located northeast of Ueno Station with both above-ground and underground tracks. The facility is capable of holding up to 20 6-car formations. Major inspections are carried out at Tokyo Metro's Nakano depot on the Marunouchi Line, forwarding over a connecting track at Akasaka-Mitsuke.

=== Former rolling stock ===
- 100 series (1938–1968)
- 1000 series (TRTA) (1927–1968)
- 1100 series (1930–1968)
- 1200 series (1934–1986)
- 1300 series (1949–1986)
- 1400 series (1953–1985)
- 1500 series (1954–1986)
- 1500N series (1968–1993)
- 1600 series (1955–1986)
- 1700 series (1956–1986)
- 1800 series (1958–1986)
- 1900 series (1958–1987)
- 2000 series (1958–1993)
- 01 series 6-car EMUs, from 1983 until March 2017

The last remaining 01 series trains were withdrawn from regular service on 10 March 2017.

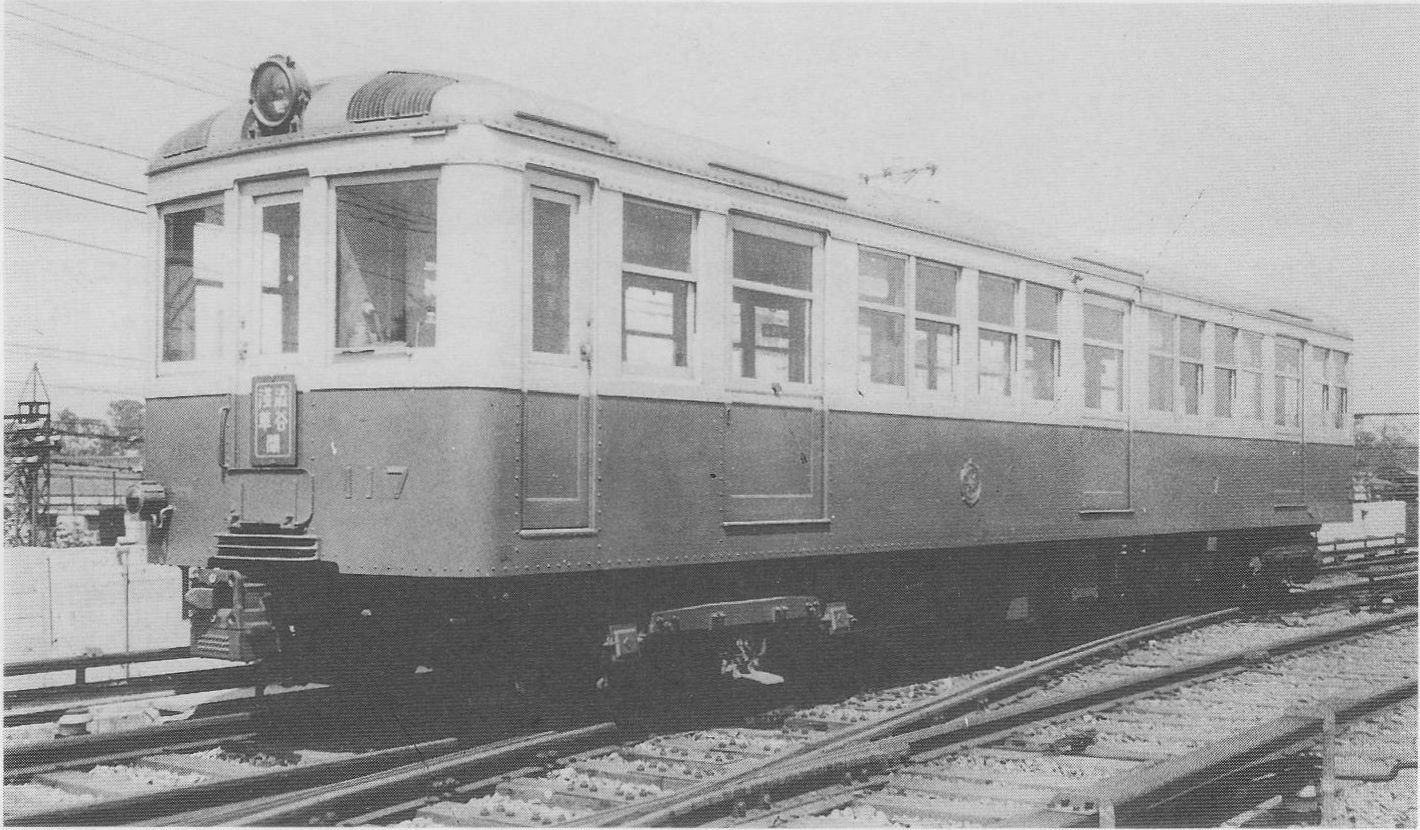
A 100 series EMU car

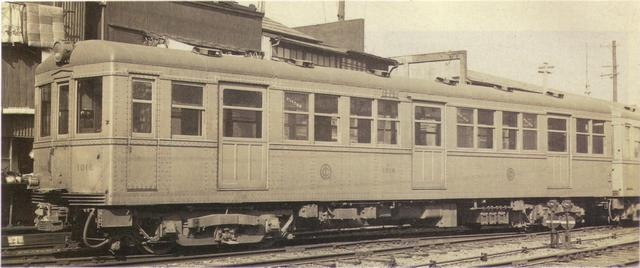
One of the original 1000 series cars operated on the Tokyo Underground Railway between Ueno and Asakusa. The last car was retired in 1968.

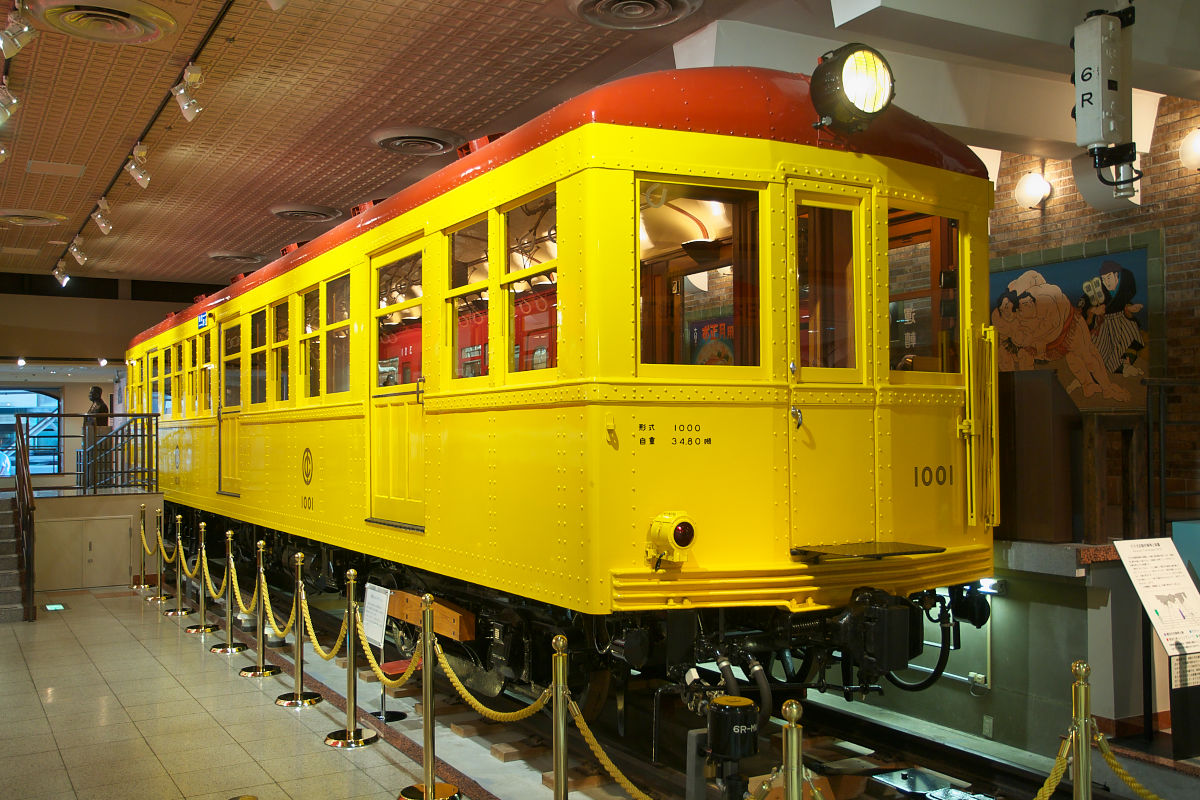
Original 1000 series car preserved at Tokyo Subway Museum

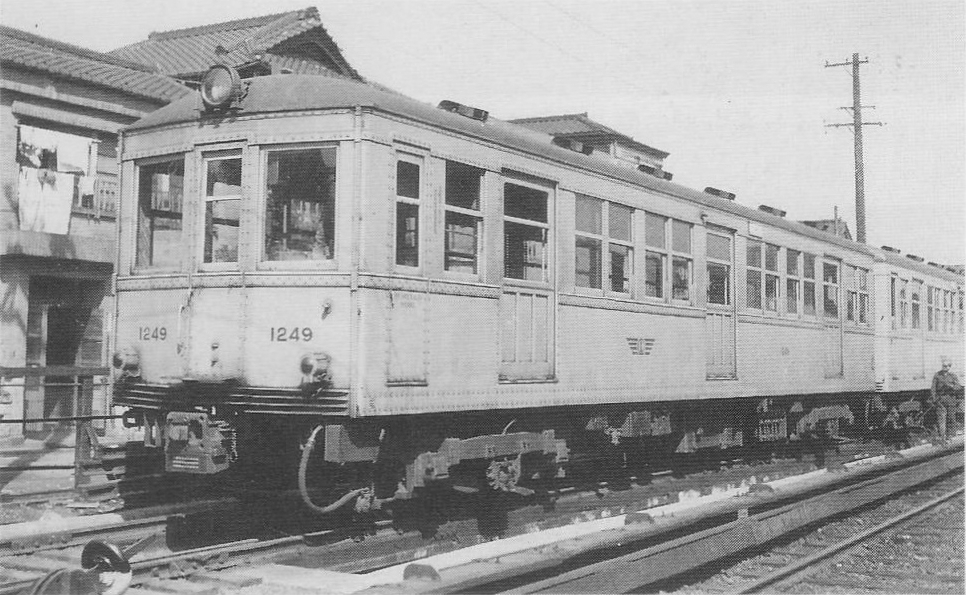
A Ginza Line 1200 series EMU in 1951

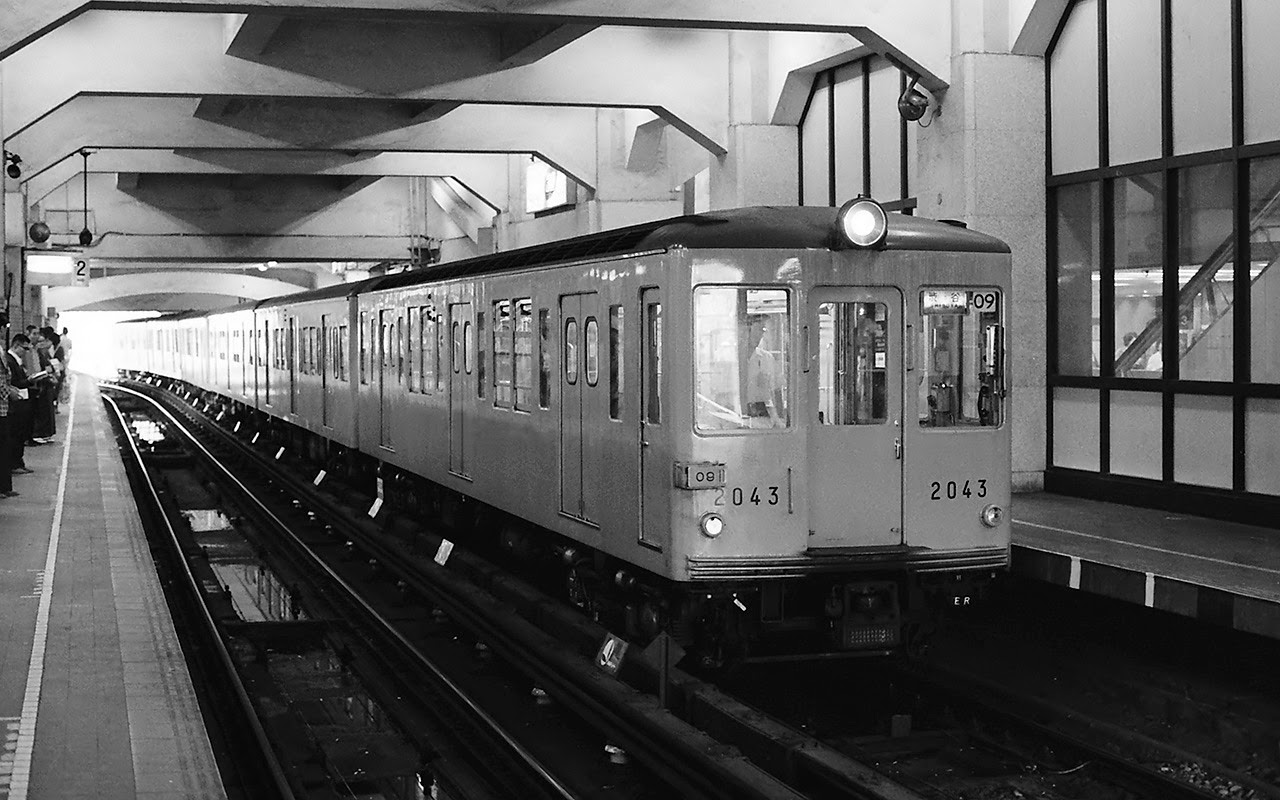
A Ginza Line 2000 series set in 1977

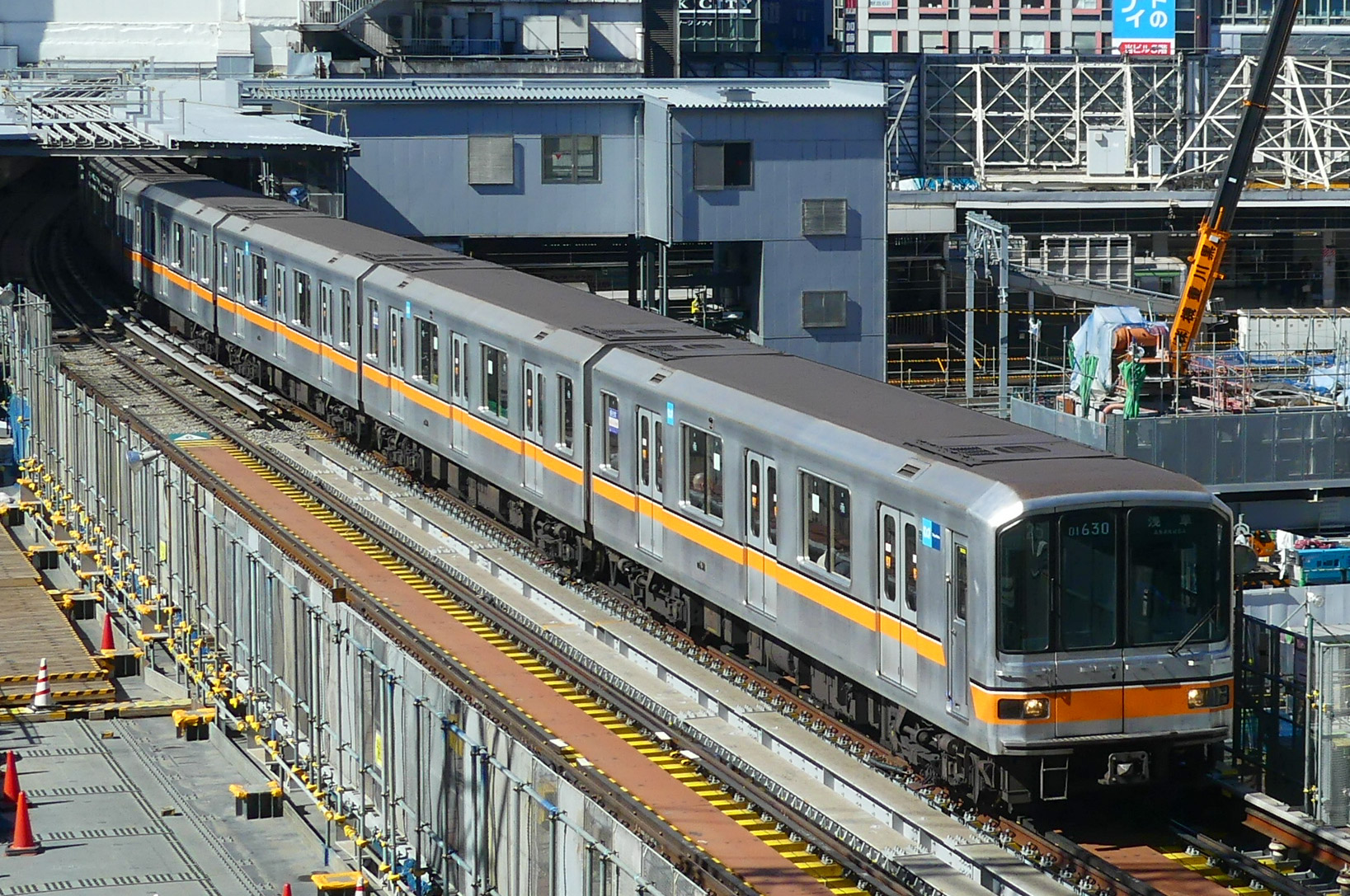
A Ginza Line 01 series EMU

== See also ==
- Tokyo Underground Railway
- Tokyo Rapid Railway
- List of Tokyo Metro stations
