= Ginza Kankan Musume (song) =

1949 song by Hideko Takamine

Single by Hideko Takamine
- B-side: "Waga Yume, Waga Uta"
- Released: April 1949
- Genre: Ryūkōka
- Length: 2:47
- Label: Victor V-40256
- Songwriter(s): Ryōichi Hattori, Takao Saeki

"Ginza Kankan Musume" (銀座カンカン娘, lit. "Ginza Kankan Girl") is a popular song composed by Ryōichi Hattori, with lyrics by Takao Saeki. It was recorded by Hideko Takamine and released in April 1949.

== Background ==
"Ginza Kankan Musume" is the theme song of the film of the same name, released in August 1949 and starring Hideko Takamine. The song's B-side, "Waga Yume, Waga Uta", is sung by Katsuhiko Haida, who also starred in the film.

The phrase kankan musume is a play on words coined by Kajirō Yamamoto that combines can-can with pan pan musume. According to Victor Records, the song had sold 420,000 copies by 1952.
