= Kyōbashi Station (Tokyo) =

Metro station in Tokyo, Japan

Kyobashi Station 京橋駅

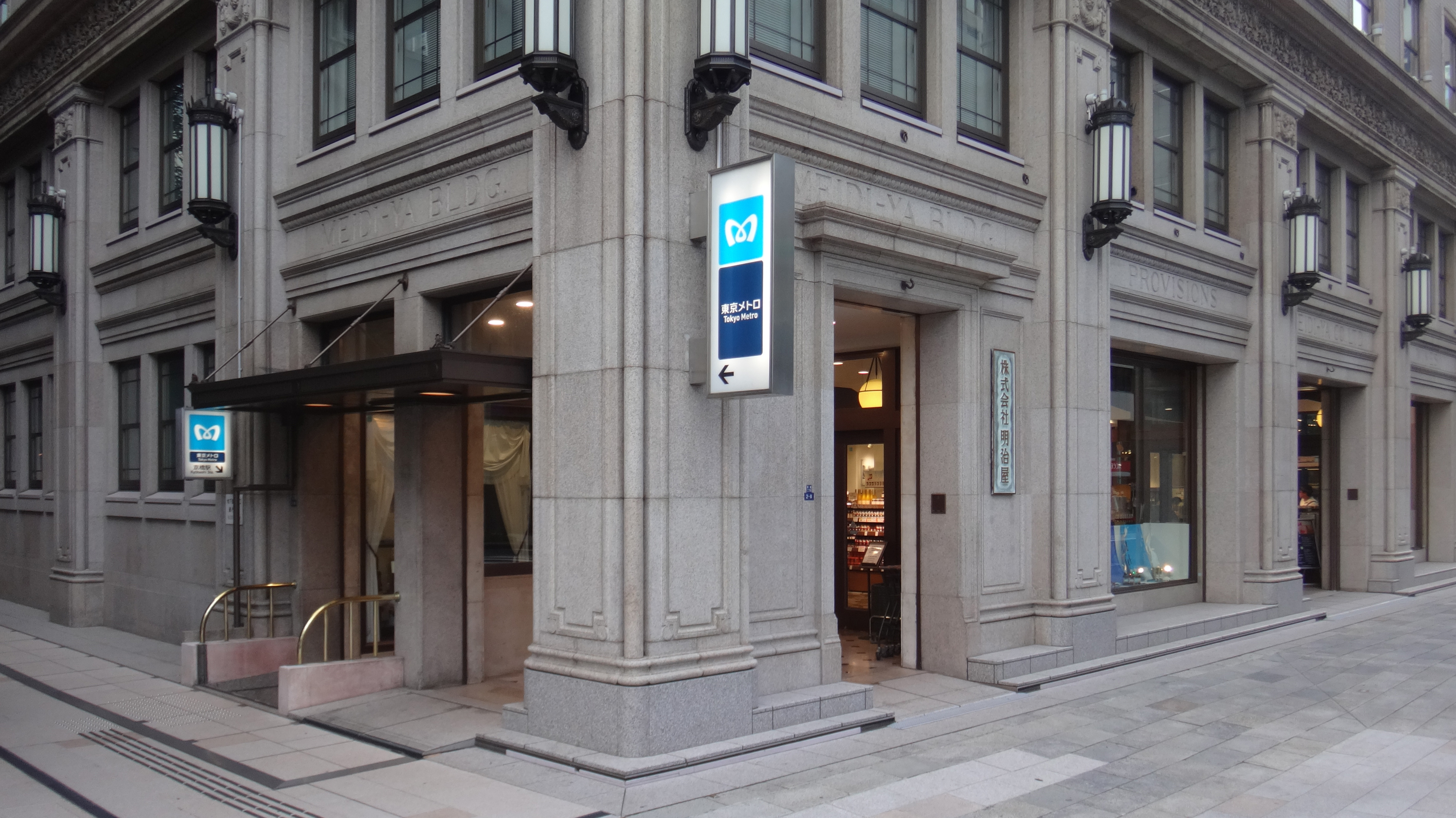
- The Meidi-ya (No. 7) entrance in August 2017

General information
- Location: 2-2-10 Kyōbashi, Chūō-ku, Tokyo; Japan
- Coordinates: 35.676725°N 139.770083°E
- Operator: Tokyo Metro
- Line: Ginza Line
- Distance: 6.4 km (4.0 mi) from Asakusa
- Platforms: 1 island platform
- Tracks: 2

Construction
- Structure type: Underground

Other information
- Station code: G-10
- Website: Official website

History
- Opened: 24 December 1932; 93 years ago

Passengers
- FY2012: 43,576 daily

Services
Preceding station	Tokyo Metro	Following station
Ginza towards Shibuya	Ginza Line	Nihombashi towards Asakusa
Location
- Location within Tokyo Yamanote Loop Location within Tokyo wards area Location within Japan

Kyobashi Station (京橋駅, Kyōbashi-eki) is a subway station on the Tokyo Metro Ginza Line in Chūō, Tokyo, Japan, operated by the Tokyo subway operator Tokyo Metro. It is numbered "G-10".

== Lines ==
Kyobashi Station is served by the 14.3 km (8.9 mi) Tokyo Metro Ginza Line from Shibuya to Asakusa, and lies 6.4 km (4.0 mi) from the starting point of the line at Asakusa.

== Station layout ==
The station has one underground island platform, located on the 2nd basement (B2F) level, serving by two tracks.

=== Platforms ===
1	Ginza Line	for Akasaka-mitsuke and Shibuya
2	Ginza Line	for Ueno and Asakusa

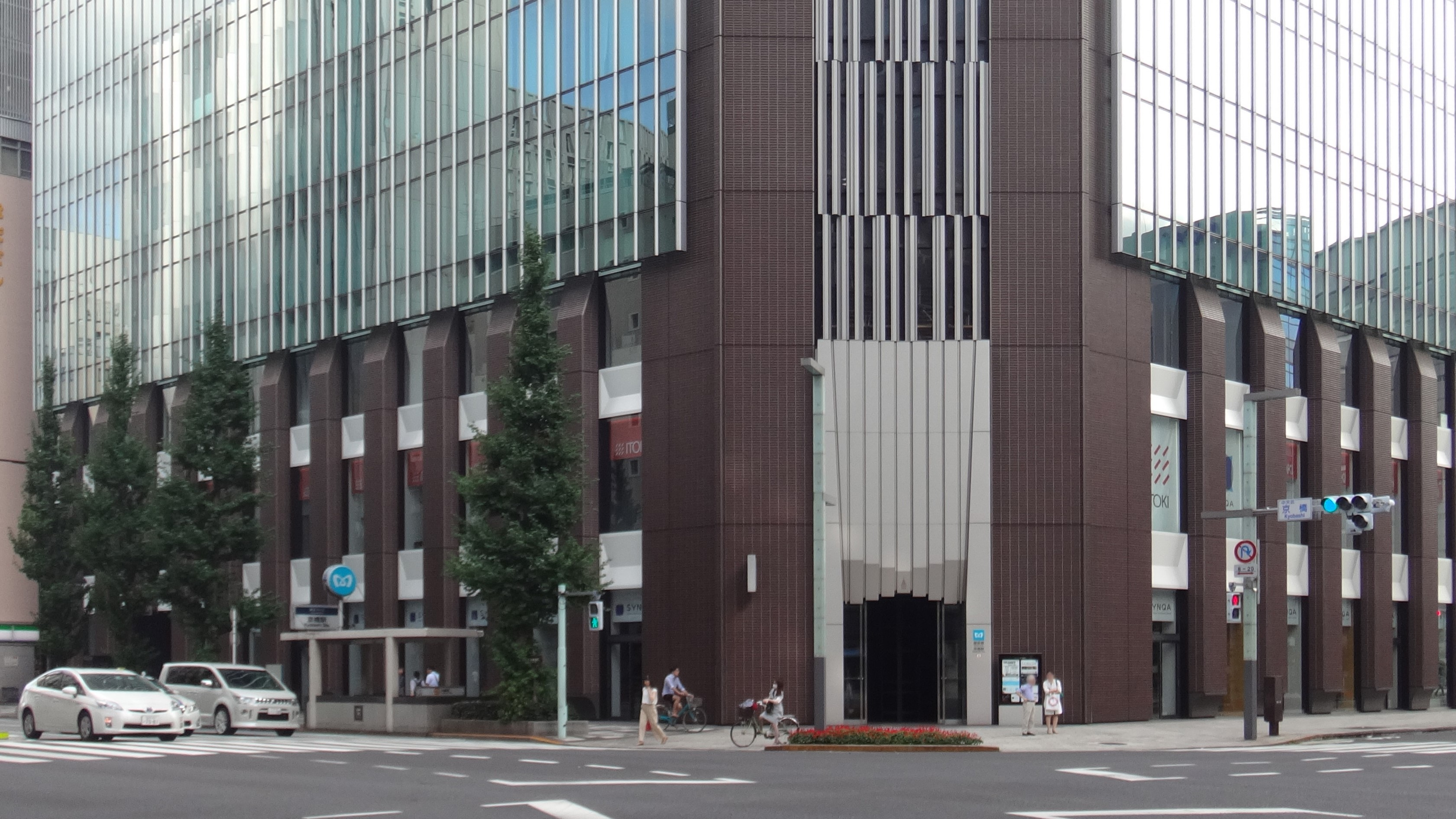
Entrances No. 1 and 2 in August 2017

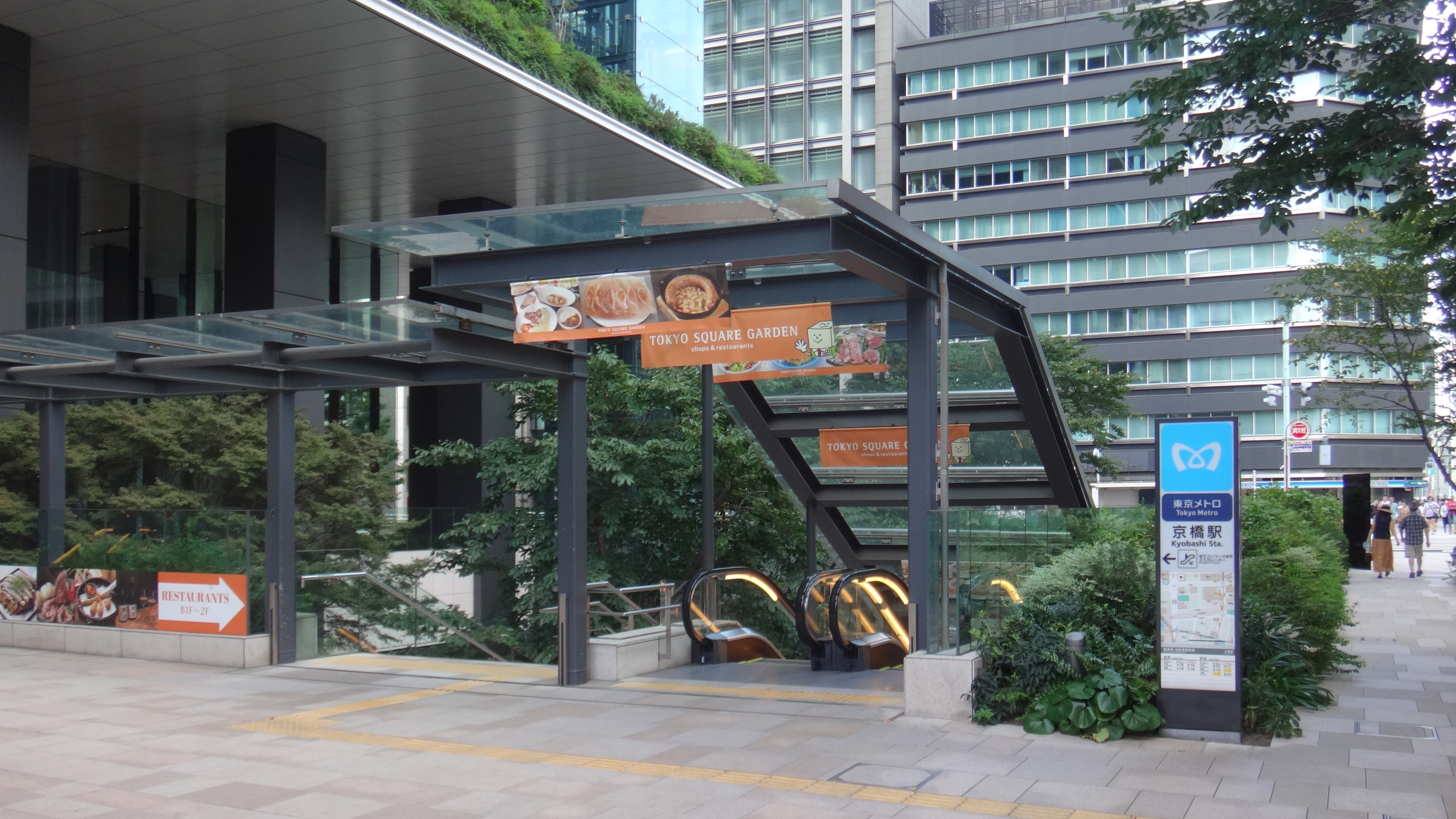
Entrance No. 5 in August 2017

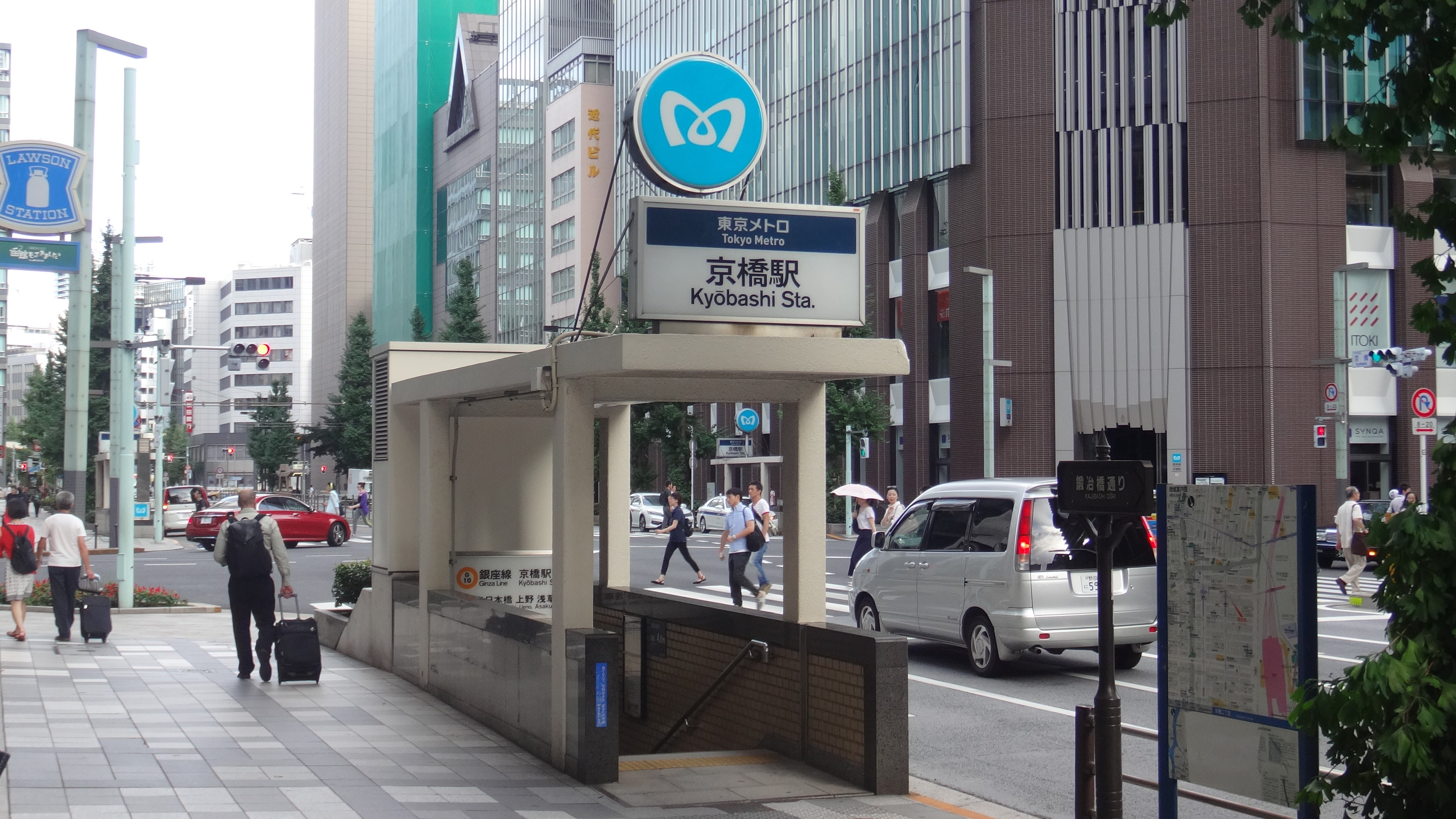
Entrance No. 5 in August 2017

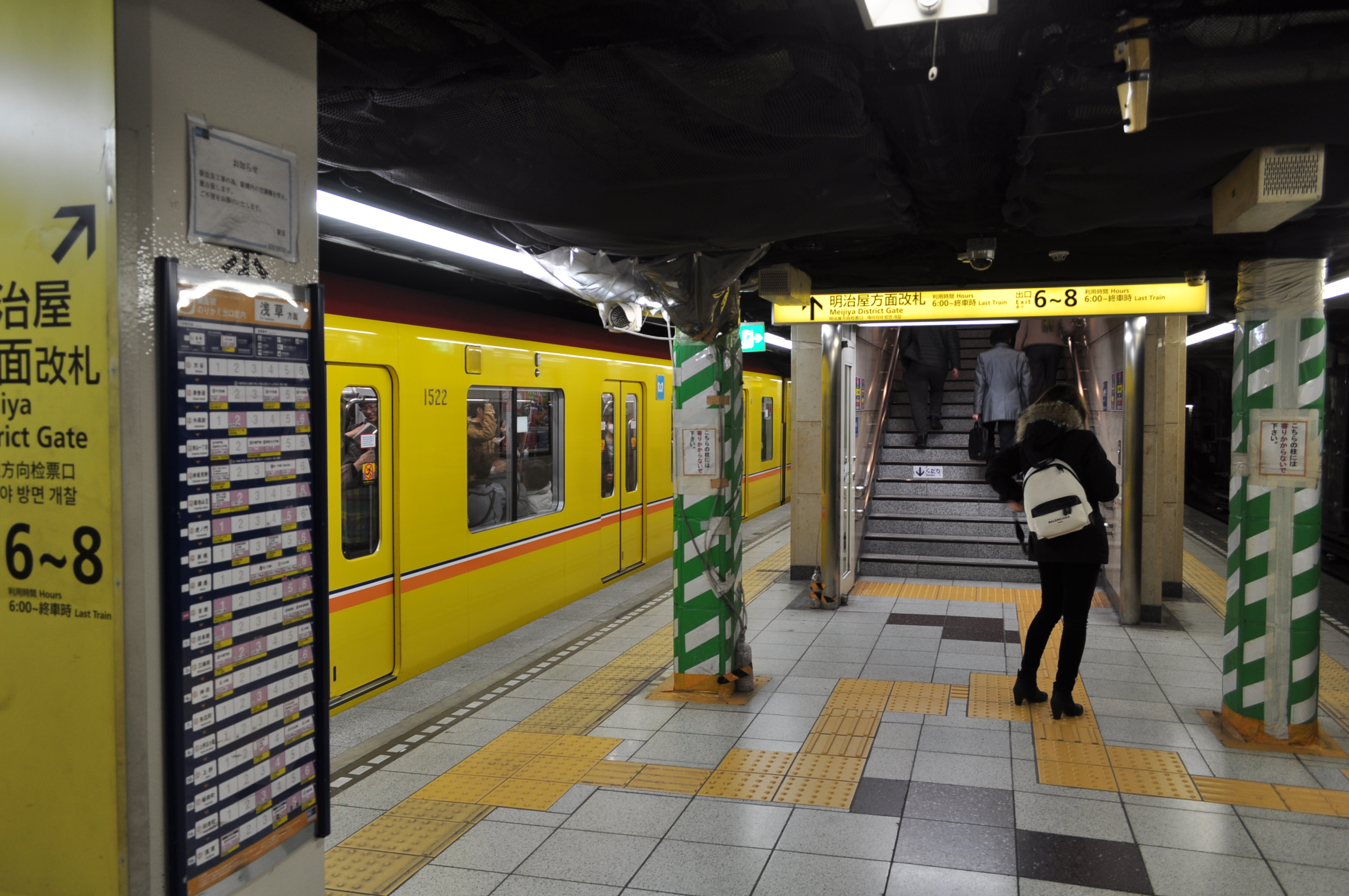
Platforms in 2018

== History ==
Kyobashi Station opened by the Tokyo Underground Railway on 24 December 1932.

The station facilities were inherited by Tokyo Metro after the privatization of the Teito Rapid Transit Authority (TRTA) in 2004.

== Passenger statistics ==
In fiscal 2012, the station was used by an average of 43,576 passengers daily.

== Surrounding area ==
- Meidi-Ya main store
- The Police Museum

=== Stations ===
- Takaracho Station
- Tokyo Station
- Yurakucho Station

=== Hotels ===
- Hotel Seiyo Ginza
- Yaesu Fujiya Gotel

=== Corporate headquarters ===
- Meiji Holdings head office
- Sumitomo Dainippon Pharma Tokyo head office

== See also ==
- List of railway stations in Japan
