= Tokyo Metro (company) =

Tokyo Metro Co., Ltd.
- Native name: 東京地下鉄株式会社
- Romanized name: Tōkyō Chikatetsu kabushiki gaisha
- Type: Government-owned public kabushiki gaisha
- Traded as: TYO: 9023
- Predecessor: Teito Rapid Transit Authority
- Founded: April 1, 2004; 22 years ago
- Headquarters: Tokyo, Japan
- Area served: Tokyo Greater Area
- Services: Public transport Real estate Retail; Education
- Owners: Minister of Finance of Japan (26.71%); Tokyo Metropolitan Government (23.29%)
- Website: www.tokyometro.jp

The Tokyo Metro Co., Ltd. (Japanese: 東京地下鉄株式会社, Hepburn: Tōkyō Chikatetsu kabushiki gaisha; lit. 'Tokyo Subway Share Company') is a tokushu gaisha (state-owned joint-stock company) jointly controlled by the Government of Japan and the Tokyo Metropolitan Government. It operates nine subway lines and is also engaged in real estate, retail and education in the Greater Tokyo Area.

Tokyo Metro was privatized and established as a private company on April 1, 2004, succeeding Teito Rapid Transit Authority (TRTA) and shifting to a more commercial model while maintaining public service obligations.

In 2024, the company made its initial public offering, raising $2.3 billion in what became Japan's biggest IPO since 2018. Tokyo Metro was listed on the Tokyo Stock Exchange, debuting as the exchange's largest IPO in six years and with a market capitalization of roughly 1 trillion yen. The Government of Japan and the Tokyo Metropolitan Government each sold half of their shares, with the former using the proceeds to repay bonds funding reconstruction after the 2011 Tōhoku earthquake and tsunami.

== History ==
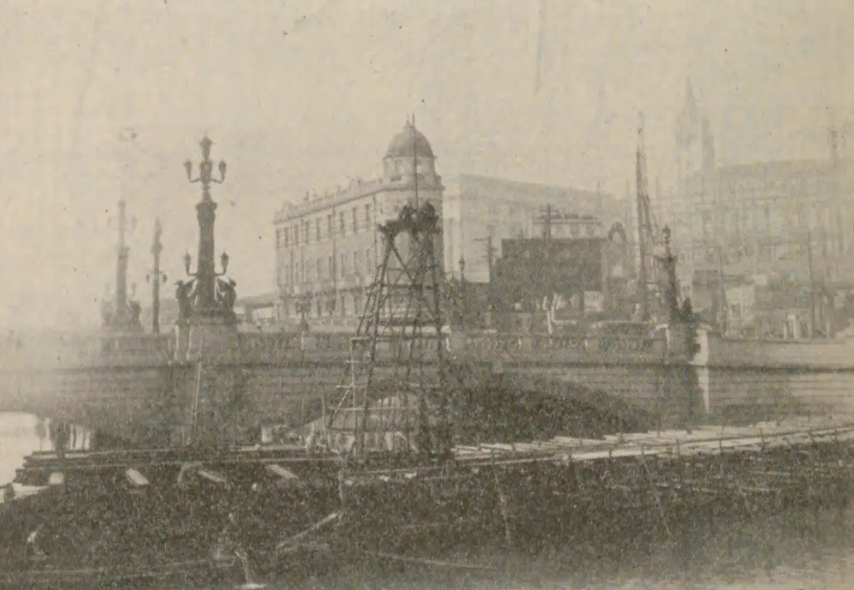
Tokyo Underground Railway Co. constructing a tunnel under the Nihonbashi River, circa 1930.

The Tokyo Underground Railway Company was founded on August 29, 1920, with the aim of developing Japan's first underground railway at a time when Tokyo was experiencing rapid urban growth. Although construction commenced in 1925, progress was hindered by economic difficulties following the Great Kantō earthquake of 1923, which caused widespread destruction and diverted resources away from major infrastructure projects. Nevertheless, the company inaugurated the first 2.2-kilometre segment of what is now the Ginza Line on December 30, 1927, linking Ueno and Asakusa and becoming the first subway line in Asia.

During the late 1930s, subway expansion gained momentum, leading to the establishment of the Tokyo Rapid Railway Company in 1938 through the consolidation of several private railway interests, including lines associated with the predecessors of present-day operators such as Tokyu Corporation. With the escalation of World War II, the government moved to centralize urban transport operations; in 1941, the Teito Rapid Transit Authority (TRTA) was created as a special public corporation, absorbing both the Tokyo Underground Railway and Tokyo Rapid Railway as part of wartime national control over resources.

In the postwar period, particularly throughout the 1950s and 1960s, economic recovery and rising population levels fueled rapid network development under TRTA management. By the end of the 1960s, most of the core subway system had been completed, with total route length exceeding 100 kilometres by 1969.

As policy emphasis shifted toward greater operational efficiency, TRTA was privatized on April 1, 2004, and reorganized as Tokyo Metro Co., Ltd., a joint-stock company jointly owned by the national government and the Tokyo Metropolitan Government. Subsequent developments included the opening of the Fukutoshin Line on June 14, 2008, which enhanced connectivity across central Tokyo, and the commencement of through-service operations with the Sotetsu and Tokyu networks on March 18, 2023, further strengthening regional rail integration. In October 2024, Tokyo Metro undertook an initial public offering, raising ¥348.6 billion through the sale of 2.32 billion shares at ¥1,200 each, the largest IPO in Japan since 2018, reflecting strong investor confidence in a system serving an average of 6.84 million passengers daily.

== Corporate structure ==
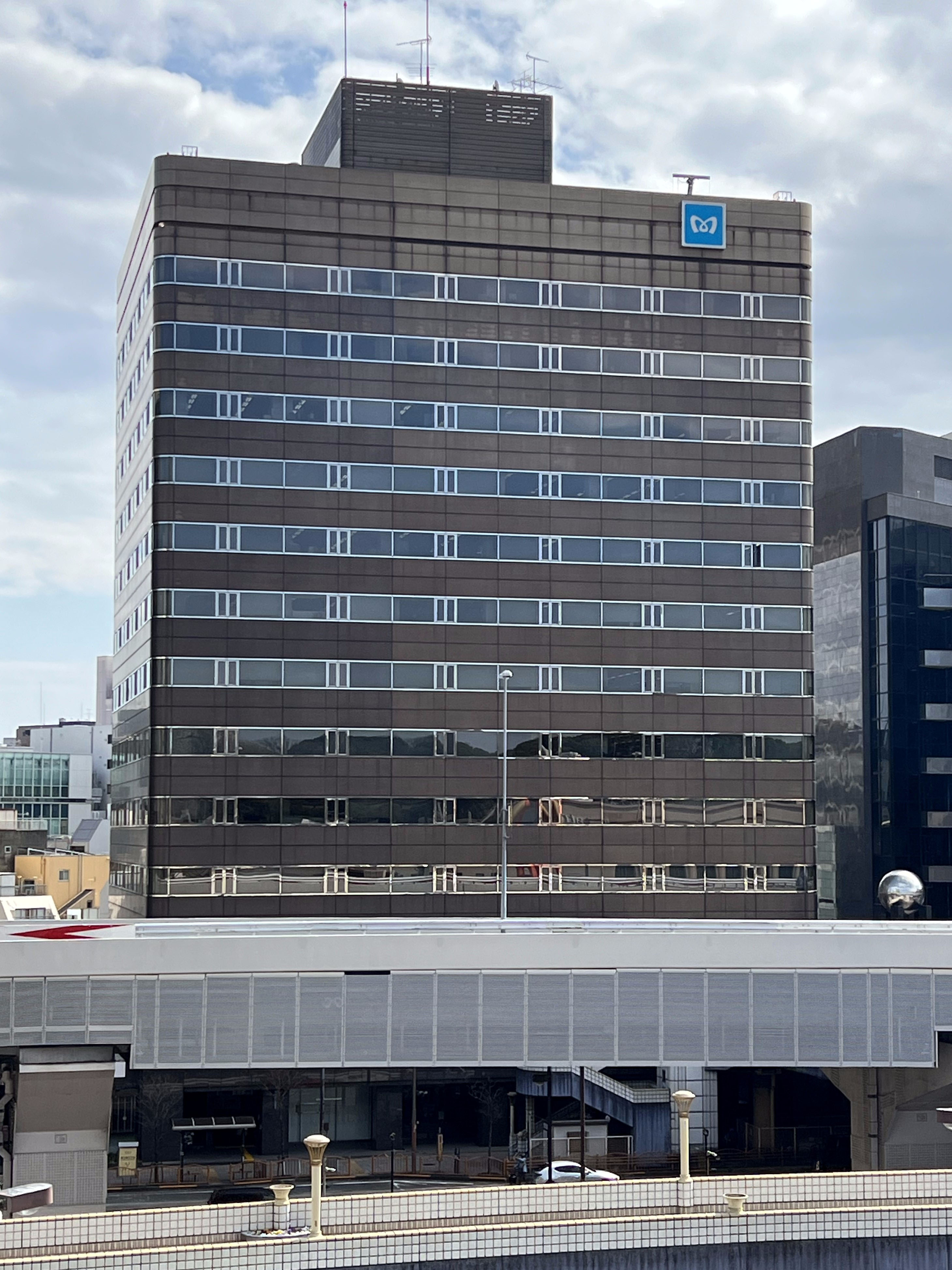
Headquarters in Taito

Its organizational framework is structured around several core operational and administrative units. These include the Operations Department, which manages day-to-day train services and passenger safety; the Facilities Department, responsible for engineering and maintenance of railway infrastructure; and the Retail and Advertising Department, which oversees station retail businesses and advertising operations and is scheduled to be rebranded as Consumer Services in the fiscal year ending March 2026. Strategic planning and long-term initiatives are coordinated by the Corporate Planning Headquarters. Corporate governance is exercised by a 14-member board of directors, chaired by President and chief executive officer Akihiro Kosaka as of October 10, 2025. Oversight and compliance functions are carried out by a four-member Audit and supervisory board. On April 1, 2025, the company introduced organizational reforms aimed at strengthening digital transformation efforts and reinforcing safety management systems, in line with the goals outlined in its 2025–2027 Mid-term Management Plan.

Workforce training and professional development are provided through the Tokyo Metro Academy. In the 2025–2026 academic year, the academy offers 25 online courses—an increase from 18 in the previous year—covering areas such as railway operations, safety management, and personnel development for industry professionals. As an enterprise with partial government ownership, Tokyo Metro continues to emphasize its public service role within its corporate operations.

=== Ownership ===
Following its initial public offering in October 2024, Tokyo Metro remains largely owned by public-sector shareholders. Before the listing, ownership was divided between the Japanese national government, which held a 53.4% stake, and the Tokyo Metropolitan Government, with 46.6%. Roughly half of these combined holdings were offered to the public in the IPO, resulting in post-listing stakes of approximately 26.7% for the national government and 23.3% for the metropolitan government. Together, public entities continue to hold about 50% of the company, with the remainder owned by private investors.

Tokyo Metro was listed on the Tokyo Stock Exchange under the stock code 9023 on October 23, 2024. The offering raised about ¥349 billion (approximately US$2.3 billion), making it the largest IPO in Japan since 2018. Proceeds were allocated primarily toward capital investment and the reduction of outstanding debt. As of November 2025, the company's market capitalization was estimated at ¥945 billion. For the fiscal year ending March 31, 2025 (FY2024), Tokyo Metro reported operating revenue of approximately ¥412 billion and net profit attributable to shareholders of ¥54 billion, representing a year-on-year profit increase of roughly 16%, largely due to a recovery in passenger demand.

=== Overseas affiliation ===
In recent years, Tokyo Metro has also taken initial steps toward international engagement, moving beyond its traditionally domestic operations. In November 2024, the company joined as a minority partner in the GTS Rail Operations consortium, led by Go-Ahead Group with Sumitomo Corporation as another minority partner, which was selected to operate London's Elizabeth Line beginning in May 2025 under a seven-year contract. This appointment marked Tokyo Metro's first involvement in overseas railway operations. Separately, in September 2025, the company provided rolling stock equipment to FEATI University in the Philippines as part of a technical cooperation and training initiative linked to a memorandum of understanding signed in April 2025. As of 2025, Tokyo Metro's overseas presence remains limited to technical assistance, consulting, and knowledge-transfer activities, with no wholly owned foreign subsidiaries established.

== Group companies ==
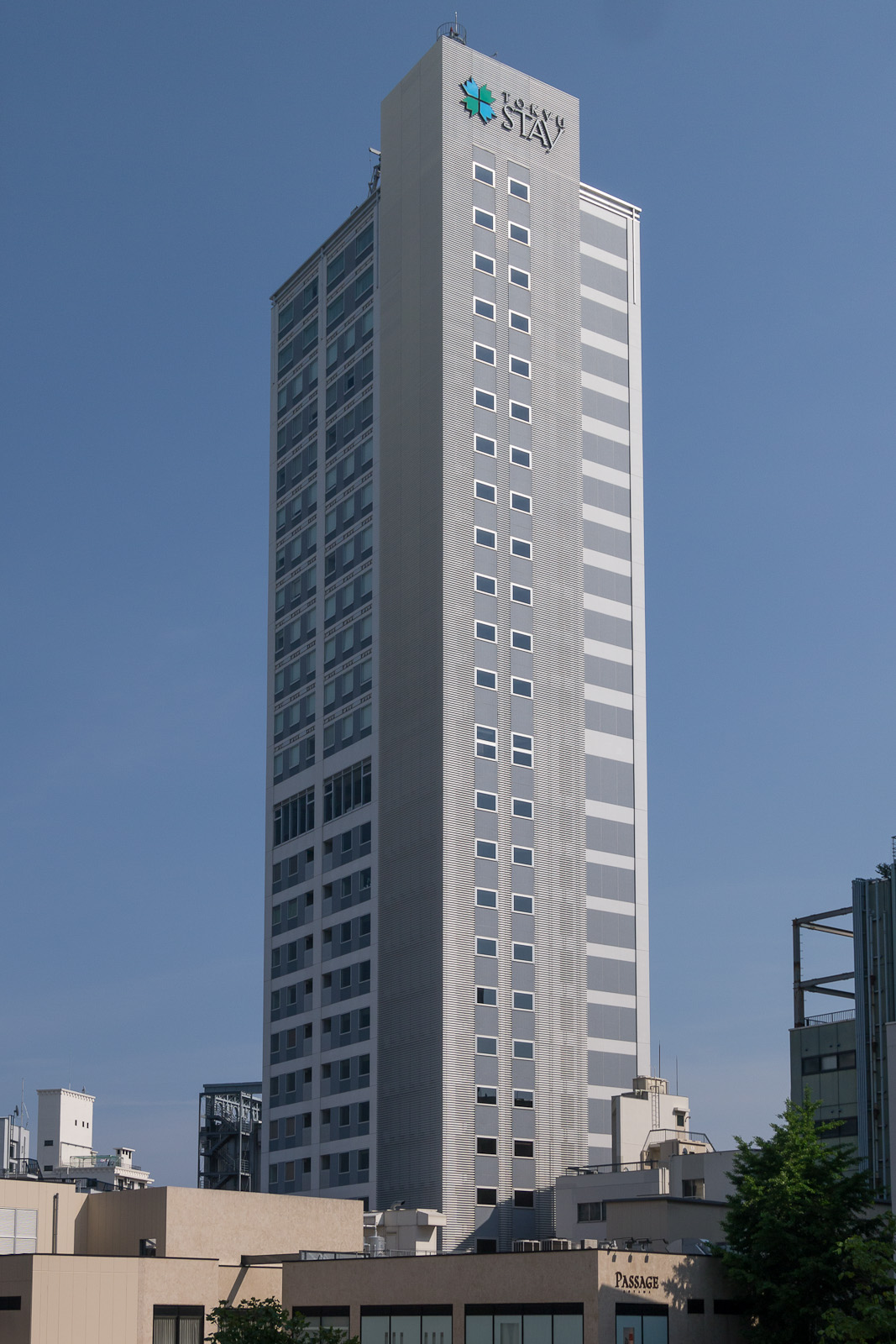
Aoyama M's Tower is a mixed-use building located in Shinjuku, Tokyo. It is owned and operated by Tokyo Metro Urban Development Co., Ltd., a subsidiary of Tokyo Metro, and houses hotel, residential, and commercial tenants.

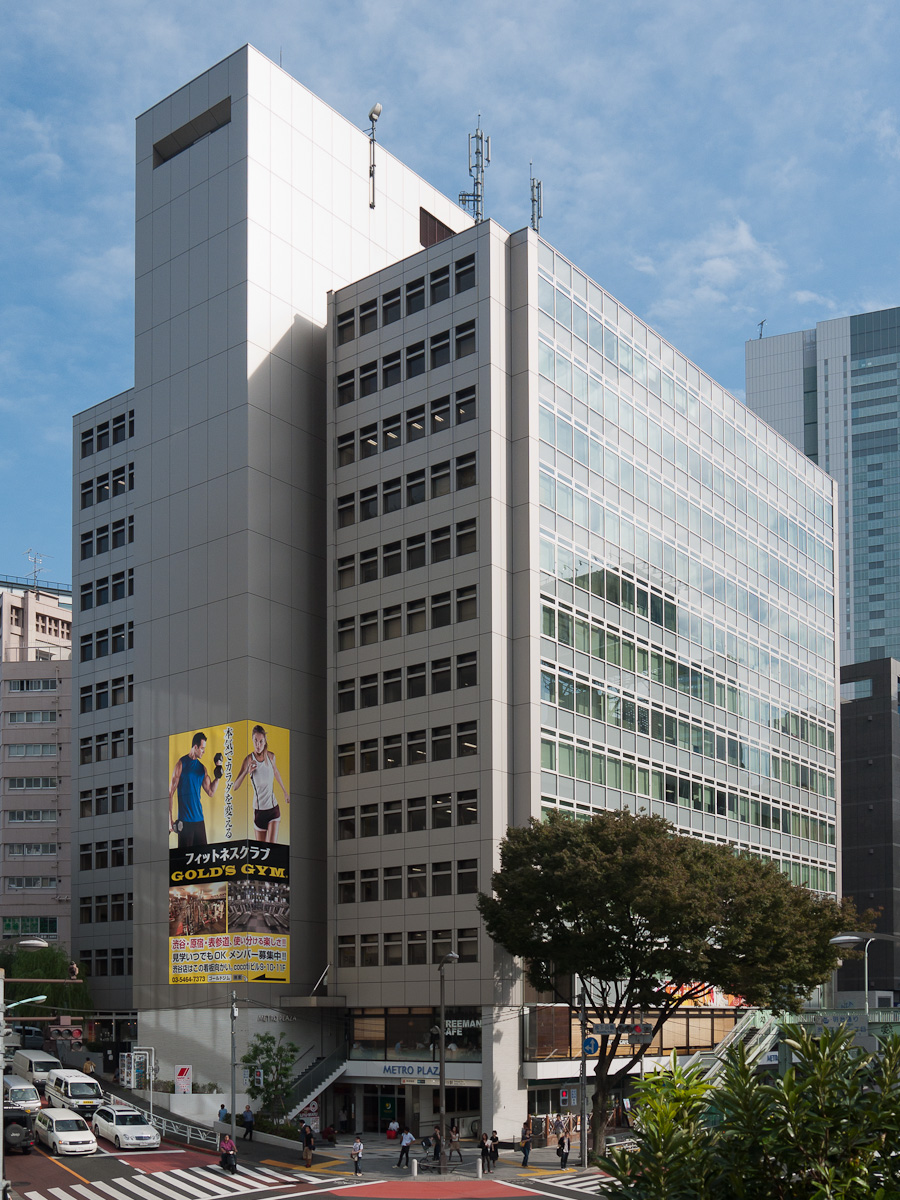
Shibuya Metro Plaza building located in Shibuya owned and operated by Tokyo Metro Urban Development Co., Ltd

- Metro Service Co., Ltd. – General cleaning and security services
- Metro Commerce Co., Ltd. – Sales, service operations, and station operations
- Metro Station Facilities Co., Ltd. – Maintenance and management of station facilities
- Metro Car Co., Ltd. – Vehicle maintenance services
- Metro Rail Facilities Co., Ltd. – Construction-related maintenance services
- Metro Development Co., Ltd. – Operation and management of underpasses and construction-related services
  - M'av, an under-station commercial facility (Urayasu, Gyotoku and Myoden) and M'av Lieta (Kita-ayase, Ayase)
  - Metro Center, an under-station shopping center (Shin-kiba, Kasai, Minami-Gyotoku, Baraki-Nakayama, Nishi-Kasai)
- Tokyo Metro Electric Maintenance Co., Ltd. – Electrical maintenance services
- Tokyo Metro Urban Development Co., Ltd. – Real estate development, leasing, and management of office buildings and related properties
- Metro Properties Co., Ltd. – Operation and management of commercial facilities, including retail spaces within train stations, commercial buildings, and restaurant businesses
  - Echika, a station-adjacent commercial facility (Omotesando and Ikebukuro)
  - Echika fit, a medium-scale version of Echika (Tokyo, Ginza, Nagatacho and Ueno)
  - Metro M Korakuen and Esola Ikebukuro
- Metro Ad Agency Co., Ltd. – Advertising media management and advertising agency services
- Tokyo Metro Educational Co., Ltd. – Management of educational facilities and planning and implementation of educational and learning support services
- Metro Life Support Co., Ltd. – Human resources and employee welfare services
- Metro Business Associe Co., Ltd. – Administrative services related to human resources, accounting, and systems management
- Metro Fleur Co., Ltd. – Building cleaning and related services
- Tokyo Metro Asset Management Co., Ltd. – Real estate transactions, investment management, and other related financial services
- VIETNAM TOKYO METRO ONE MEMBER LIMITED LIABILITY COMPANY – Support for urban railway development projects in Vietnam
- Metro Cultural Foundation – Public service activities, including museum operations
- Metoiro nursery school
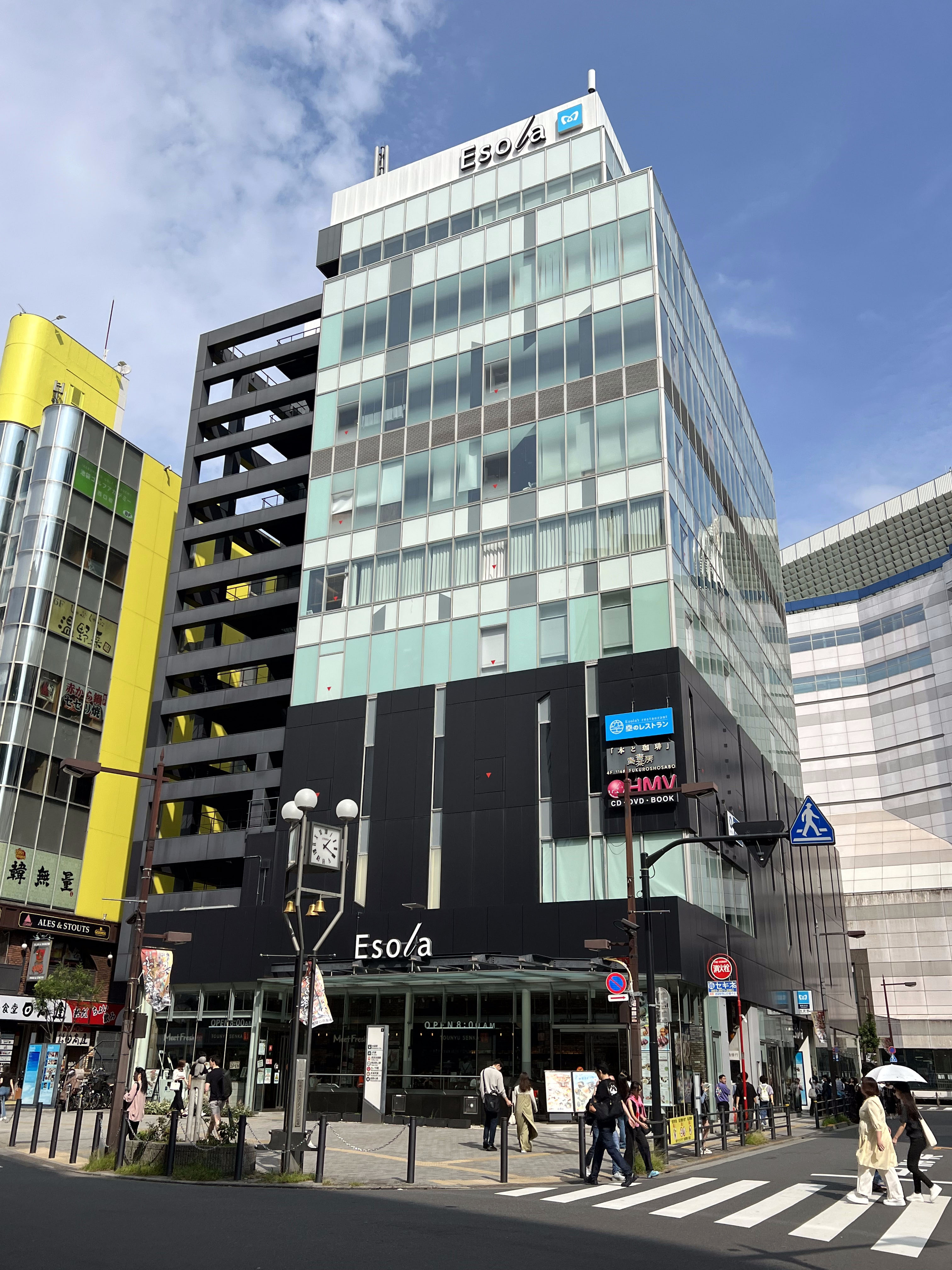
Esola Ikebukuro, a commercial building in Ikebukuro operated by Metro Properties Co., Ltd.

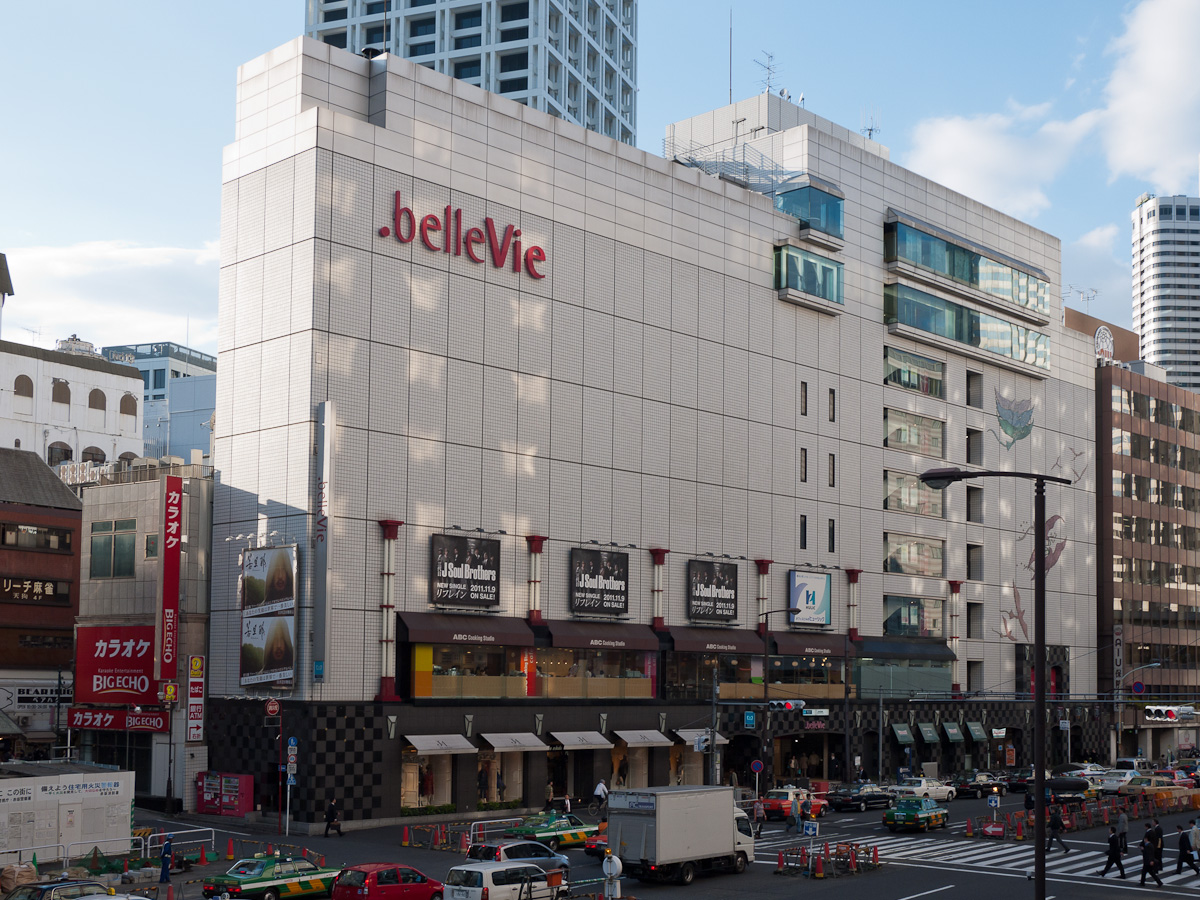
belleVie Akasaka, a commercial building right above Akasaka-mitsuke Station operated by Metro Properties Co., Ltd.

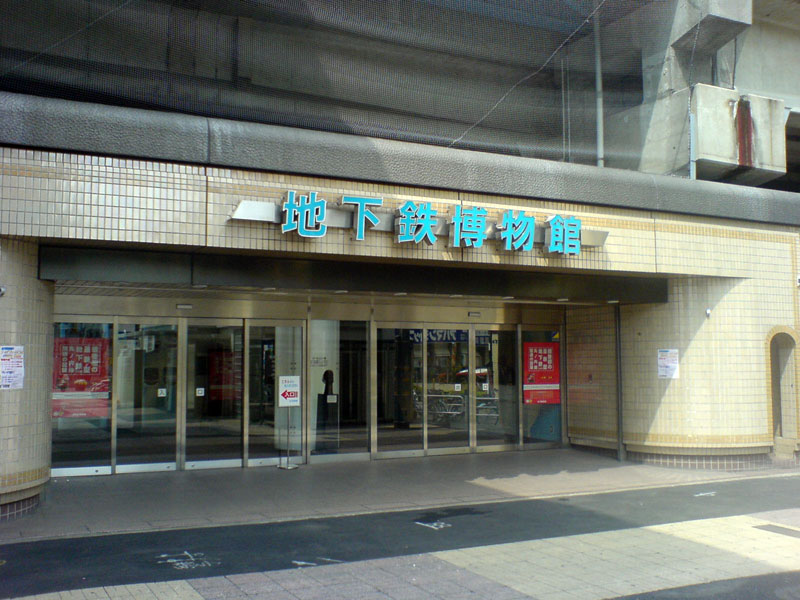
Metro Museum, operated by Metro Cultural Foundation

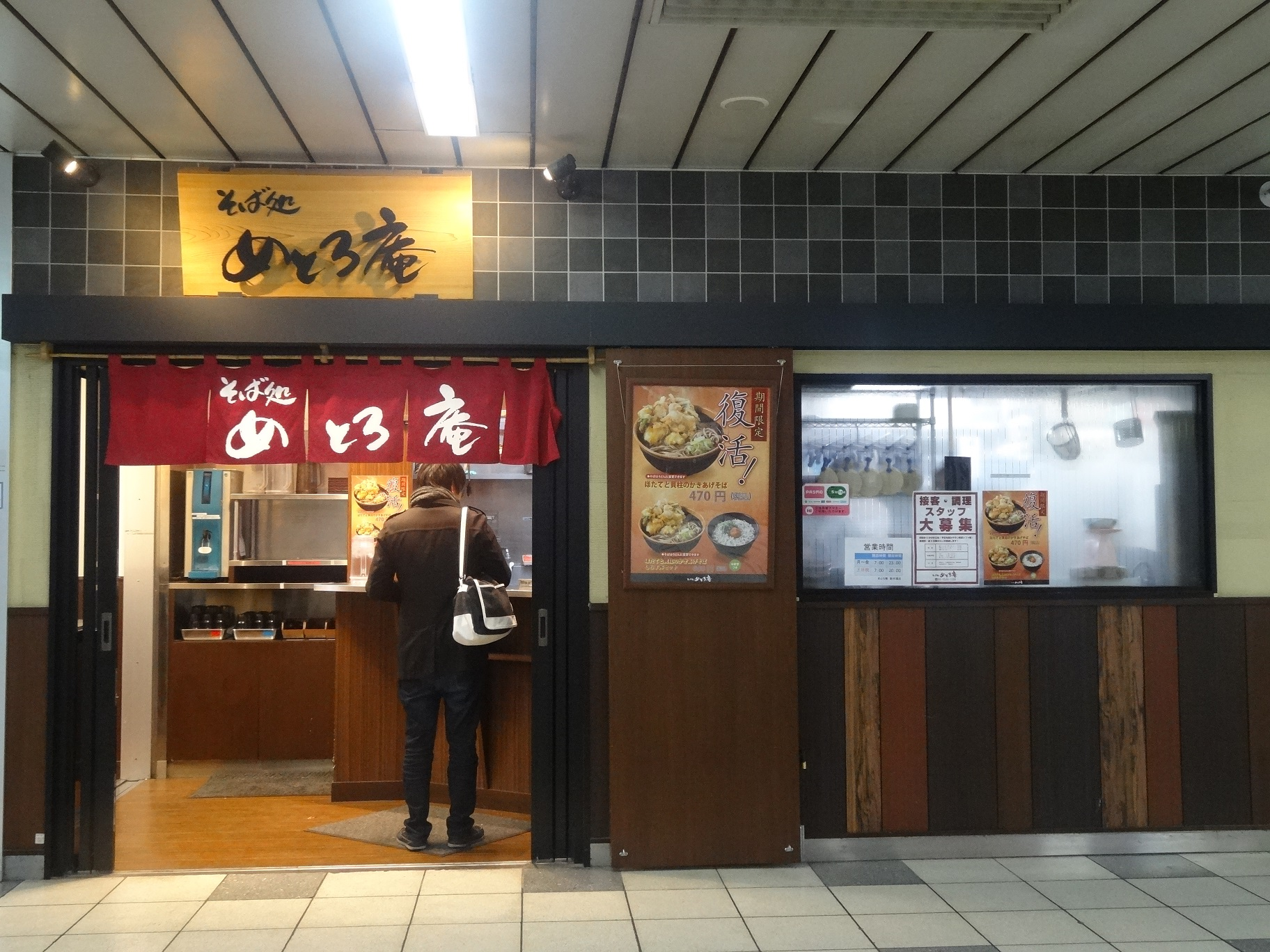
Soba restaurant Metro-an at the Shin-Kiba Station

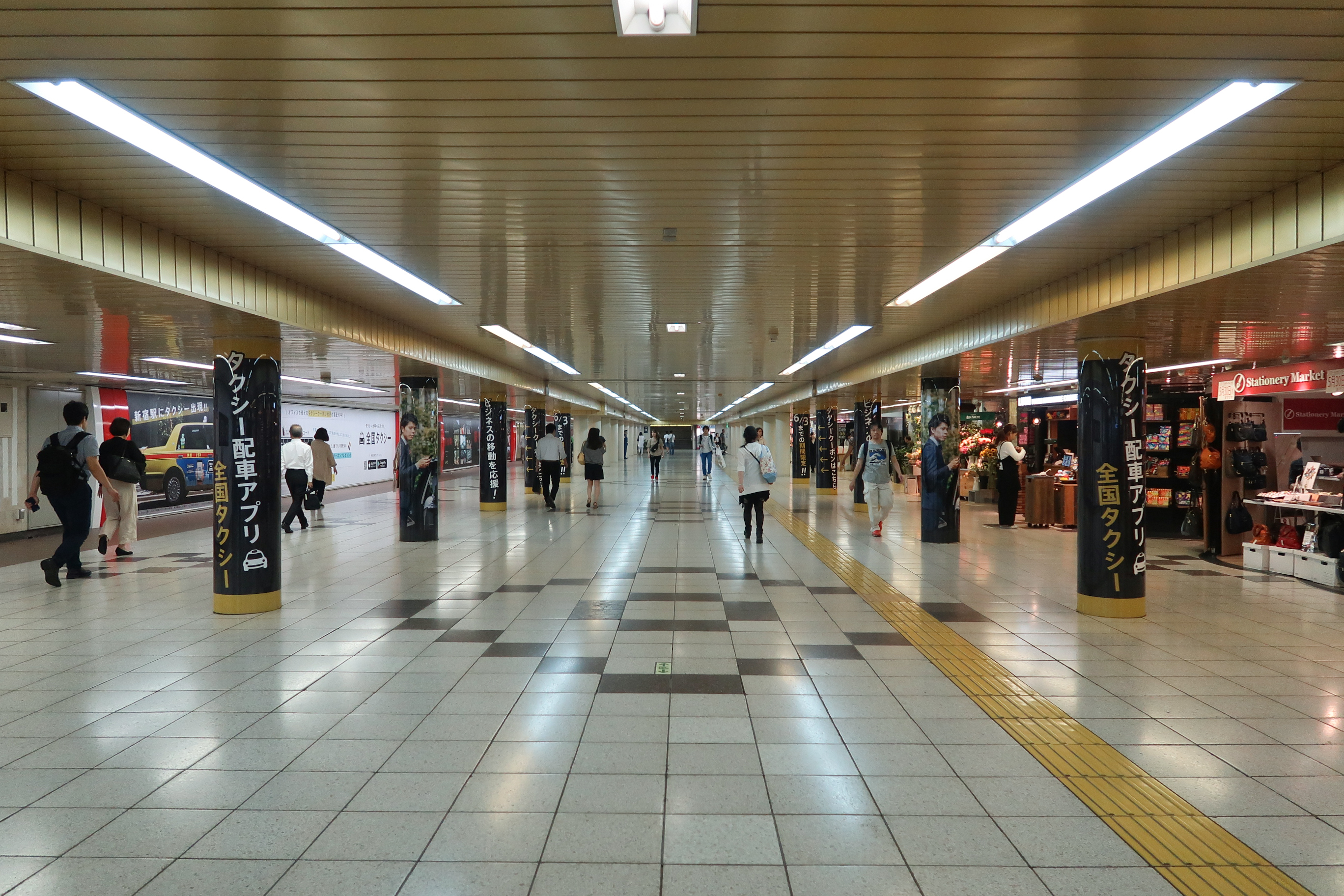
Metro Promenade, pedestrian underground passageway located between Shinjuku Station and Shinjuku-sanchome Station.

== Future plans ==
Tokyo Metro's Mid-term Management Plan for fiscal years 2025–2027, titled Run! Soar Beyond the Next Generation, sets out a strategic framework focused on strengthening safety, improving service stability, and achieving sustainable growth following the company's initial public offering in October 2024. Over the three-year period, the plan allocates approximately ¥400 billion in capital expenditure, of which ¥350 billion is designated for railway facilities and operations, excluding the construction of new lines. Major investment areas include safety-related measures such as flood prevention and the introduction of communications-based train control systems (¥87 billion), automation and railway system strategies including automated train operation technologies (¥24 billion), barrier-free initiatives such as platform doors and elevators (¥23 billion), and passenger-oriented improvements, including station refurbishments and line-specific upgrades (¥100 billion).

A central objective of the plan is the expansion of automation to enhance both operational efficiency and safety. Tokyo Metro aims to introduce GOA 2.5-level automated train operation on the Marunouchi Line by the latter half of FY2027, with on-site testing scheduled to begin in FY2025; as of November 2025, trial operations are in progress toward a phased deployment. Environmental sustainability is also a key pillar, with the company advancing its Tokyo Metro Zero CO2 Challenge 2050. Under this initiative, Tokyo Metro targets a 50% reduction in carbon dioxide emissions by FY2030 compared with FY2013 levels, bringing annual emissions below 292,000 tonnes through the adoption of energy-efficient equipment and increased use of renewable energy sources.

In the post-IPO period, Tokyo Metro's corporate vision, Keeping Tokyo on the Move, positions the operator as a contributor to next-generation urban mobility by leveraging its rail network to develop new services and revenue streams. The management plan highlights the expansion of non-railway businesses, forecasting real estate-related operating revenue of ¥16.1 billion and consumer and corporate services revenue—including retail and advertising—of ¥30.8 billion by FY2027. These initiatives are expected to raise total operating revenue to ¥408.1 billion and operating profit to ¥93 billion, reducing dependence on fare income while making greater use of station-area development and digital platforms.

Key initiatives under the plan include reconfiguring six Series 9000 train sets from six to eight cars for use on the Namboku Line by FY2027 in response to increasing passenger demand, as well as strengthening digital fare collection systems through wider adoption of QR code and credit card payments. In addition, Tokyo Metro launched the Tokyo City Pass in March 2025 to facilitate seamless transfers across multiple transport modes. The company is also expanding the international application of its operational expertise through overseas operations and maintenance contracts—most notably its involvement in London's Elizabeth Line—and through technical advisory activities in Southeast Asia, including projects in Vietnam and the Philippines. Collectively, these initiatives are intended to support the recovery and long-term growth of ridership, with future line extensions projected to attract approximately 457,000 additional daily passengers by FY2040.

The Mid-term Management Plan is closely aligned with the Tokyo Metropolitan Government's long-range policy framework, Future Tokyo: Tokyo's Long-Term Strategy, which sets development goals through 2050. Tokyo Metro's investments in sustainable facilities and network capacity are coordinated with metropolitan targets for carbon neutrality and resilient transport systems. By encouraging community-focused development around new stations and emphasizing environmentally friendly technologies, the company contributes to broader efforts to increase public transport capacity while addressing the impacts of demographic change and climate-related risks.

== See also ==
- Tokyo Underground Railway
- Tokyo Rapid Railway
- List of Tokyo Metro stations
- Tokyo Subway
  - Toei Subway
- List of urban rail systems in Japan
