= Tokyo subway rolling stock =

The Tokyo subway system consists of services provided by two operators, each with their own rolling stock:

- Toei Subway rolling stock
- Tokyo Metro rolling stock
