= Teito Rapid Transit Authority =

Rail operator in Japan (1941–2004)

- Logo

- Native name: 帝都高速度交通営団
- Type: Semi-public
- Predecessor: Tokyo Underground Railway; Tokyo Rapid Railway
- Founded: 1941
- Defunct: 2004
- Fate: Privatized
- Successor: Tokyo Metro Co., Ltd.
- Headquarters: Tokyo
- Area served: Greater Tokyo Area
- Services: Public transport
- Website: www.tokyometro.go.jp Archived

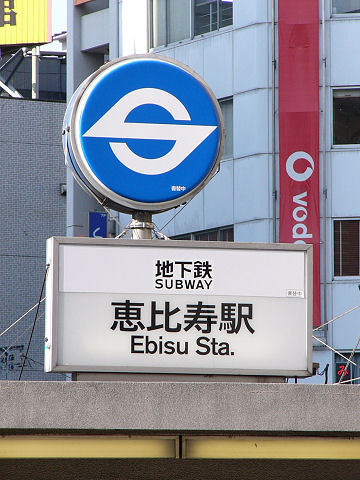
The entrance sign (the station name sign and the S mark part separated before 1991). This photo was taken just before the transition to Tokyo Metro, and the Tokyo Metro logo and the letters "Tokyo Metro" have been covered with stickers.

The Teito Rapid Transit Authority (Japanese: 帝都高速度交通営団, Hepburn: Teito kōsoku-do kōtsū eidan; lit. "Imperial Capital Highspeed Transportation Management Foundation"), commonly abbreviated as Eidan (営団), was a railway operator jointly funded by the Japanese government and the Tokyo Metropolitan Government. It operated the subway system within Tokyo’s special wards from 1941 until 2004. Alternative English renderings of its name included Teidan Subway and Transportation Eidan. The authority was established under the Imperial Capital Rapid Transit Authority Act as a public law corporation.

The authority was placed under the supervision of the Ministry of Railways, later the Ministry of Transport and Communications, followed by the Ministry of Transport, and ultimately the Ministry of Land, Infrastructure, Transport and Tourism.

It was one of the state-controlled management bodies, commonly referred to as Eidan, established during the Second Sino-Japanese War as part of the government’s efforts to centralize control and administration. The term Teito refers to the capital of Empire of Japan, Tokyo, while high speed does not denote high-speed rail in the modern sense, such as the Shinkansen, but instead refers to urban rapid transit in contrast to the streetcars that had previously been the primary mode of urban transportation.

== History ==
Its establishment was originally conceived as part of a policy of transportation adjustment, a framework intended to consolidate and stabilize transportation operators that were struggling with competition during the Great Depression of the 1930s (a concept later formalized in the Land Transportation Business Adjustment Act). Similar forms of transport restructuring were already underway in cities such as London and Berlin, driven by the rapid growth of automobile use, and reflected a broader international trend. Under this policy, the authority was envisioned as a comprehensive transportation operator responsible not only for subway services but also for rail and bus operations throughout the Tokyo area.

However, the outbreak of the Second Sino-Japanese War in 1937 triggered a sudden economic expansion, and the resulting increase in transportation demand undermined the original rationale for transportation adjustment. As a result, the plan was revised: subway operations were assigned to a newly established special public corporation, while streetcars and bus services were placed under the management of the Tokyo City Government, later succeeded by the Tokyo Metropolitan Government.

Pursuant to the Imperial Capital Rapid Transit Authority Act, promulgated on March 7, 1941, and effective from May 1 of the same year, the corporation was established on July 4, 1941. Its mandate was to operate underground urban rapid transit services in Tokyo City, Tokyo Prefecture—renamed Tokyo Metropolis in 1943 following the implementation of the Tokyo Metropolitan Government Ordinance—and the surrounding areas.

On September 1, 1941, in accordance with the Land Transportation Business Adjustment Act enacted in August 1938 and under the wartime economic system during the Second Sino-Japanese War, the authority assumed control of the subway lines operated by the Tokyo Underground Railway and the Tokyo Rapid Railway, which together formed the present-day Ginza Line. It also acquired unfinished routes from both companies, incomplete lines planned by the Tokyo City Government, and unexecuted subway licenses held by the Keihin Subway. The total acquisition cost amounted to ¥123,235,000, paid primarily through transportation bonds.

=== Interwar line construction plans ===
Following the establishment of the Teito Rapid Transit Authority, the Pacific War began on December 8, 1941. Despite the outbreak of war, the authority continued to pursue its mandate of expanding Tokyo’s subway network.

As part of these efforts, the Shinjuku–Tokyo section was designated as an emergency construction route. Construction of the Yotsuya-mitsuke–Akasaka-mitsuke segment was scheduled to begin in 1942 and to be completed by 1945, while construction of the Shinjuku–Yotsuya-mitsuke and Akasaka-mitsuke–Tokyo sections was planned to commence in 1943, with completion targeted for 1946. The total projected cost for this project, including 120 railcars and the Shinjuku depot, was estimated at ¥140.5 million.

Additional plans included the construction of the Ikebukuro–Tokyo section, with an estimated cost of ¥155,068,000 including 162 railcars, and the Tsukiji–Gotanda section, budgeted at ¥115,446,000 including 118 railcars. Construction on both routes was scheduled to begin in 1942, with completion anticipated after 1947.

On June 5, 1942, a groundbreaking ceremony was held for the Yotsuya-mitsuke–Akasaka-mitsuke section, and construction commenced near the Benkei hori (弁慶濠). However, as the war situation deteriorated, shortages of funding, materials, and labor intensified, leading to the suspension of construction in June 1944.

In April 1951, following the end of World War II, the capital contributions of private railway companies were withdrawn in order to clarify the public nature of the Teito Rapid Transit Authority. As recommended by the Transport Policy Council, ownership interests were transferred to Japanese National Railways and the Tokyo Metropolitan Government to facilitate fiscal investment and loan-based support for the continued development of Tokyo’s subway system.

=== Post-WWII ===
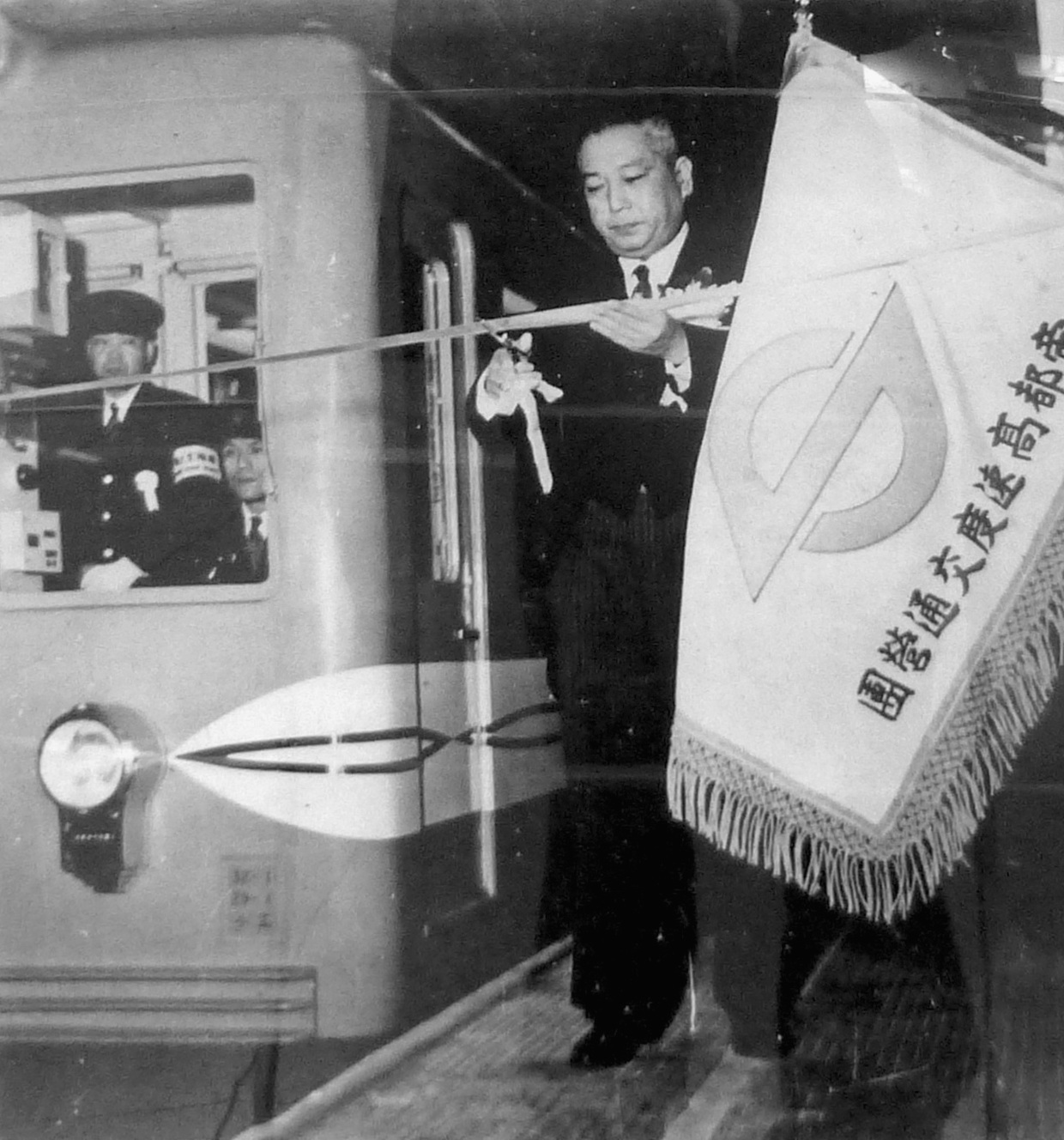
Opening of the Marunouchi Line, 1954

After World War II, under directives issued by the General Headquarters of the Supreme Commander for the Allied Powers (GHQ), which occupied Japan, most Eidans except for Teito Rapid Transit were either dissolved or reorganized as public corporations. The Teito Rapid Transit Authority was also initially considered for abolition by GHQ, which viewed it as an undemocratic institution originating under the wartime system. The Tokyo Metropolitan Government, which had sought to assume leadership of subway operations even before the war, expressed strong interest in the prosect.

However, because Tokyo lacked practical experience in subway operation at the time, and because GHQ accepted arguments advanced by the national government and the authority itself—that the Teito Rapid Transit Authority had been established not for wartime purposes but as part of broader, internationally comparable discussions on transportation industry reorganization—the authority was retained without major structural changes. As a result, organizations bearing the term Imperial Capital (Teito) in their names continued to exist for nearly six decades after the adoption of Japan’s postwar constitutional system.

During this period, the broader environment of urban transportation administration evolved significantly, including the commencement of subway operations directly managed by the Tokyo Metropolitan Government in 1960 and the privatization of Japanese National Railways in 1987. Nevertheless, these developments had little direct impact on the organizational structure or operations of the Teito Rapid Transit Authority.

=== Abolition of the Teito Rapid Transit Authority and corporatization ===
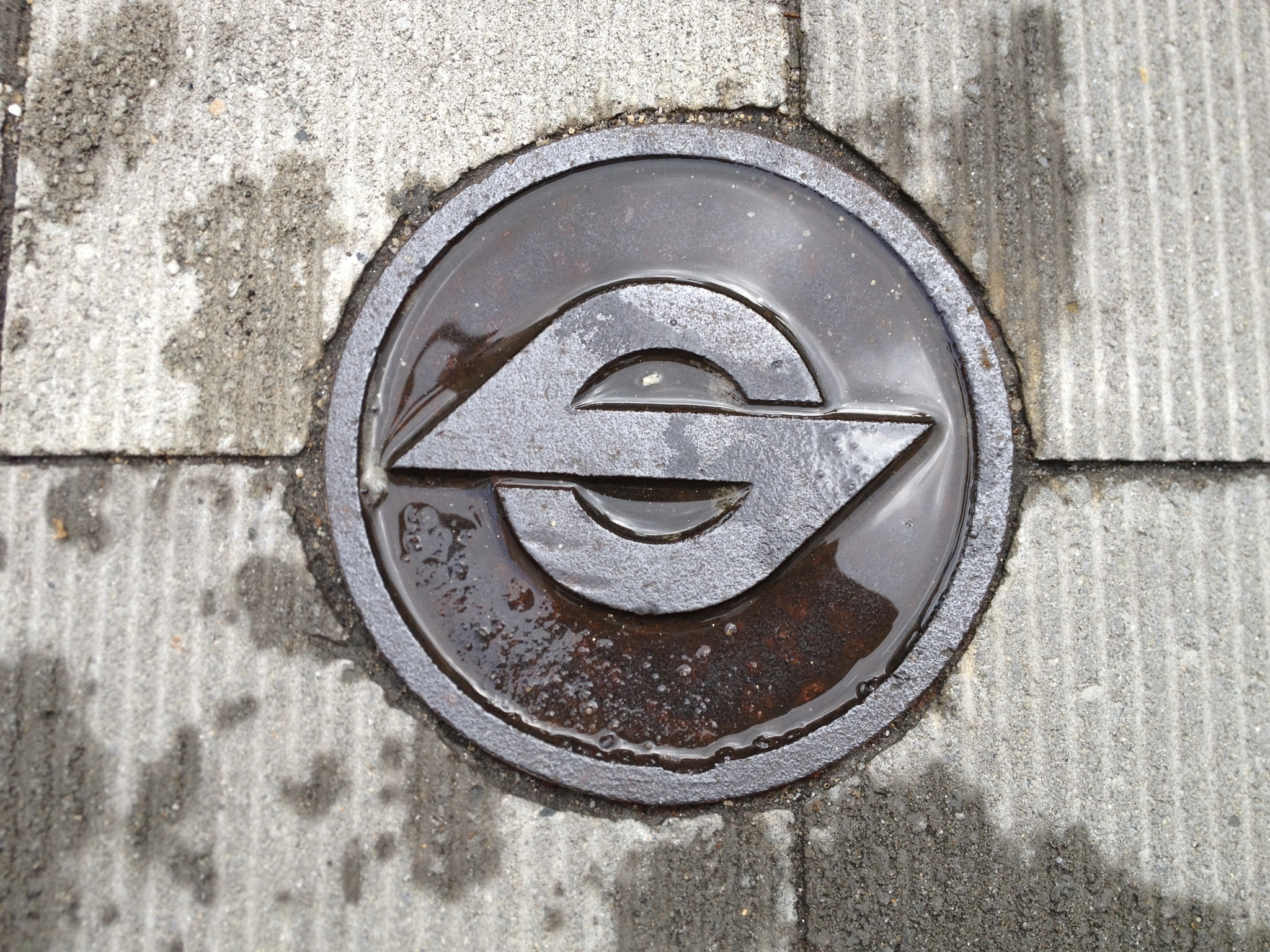
A manhole cover bearing the “S” mark located on a sidewalk near Suehirochō Station. At the time this photograph was taken in 2012, the Teito Rapid Transit Authority subway had already been privatized.

Plans to privatize the Teito Rapid Transit Authority began with a cabinet decision in 1995, which proposed its conversion into a special company as an initial step, around the period when construction of the Namboku Line and the Hanzōmon Line was nearing completion. Subsequently, in December 2001, the Koizumi Cabinet enacted the Basic Act on Special Corporation Reform, which targeted approximately 160 special public corporations and authorized corporations for restructuring. Under this framework, it was decided that the Teito Rapid Transit Authority would be reorganized as a special company in the spring of 2004, following the opening of the Hanzōmon Line extension.

This process has sometimes been compared to the breakup and privatization of Japanese National Railways (JNR); however, the circumstances differed significantly. JNR was effectively insolvent due to excessive debt, whereas the Teito Rapid Transit Authority was subject to administrative reform as part of broader government restructuring rather than financial distress. The authority faced no major management difficulties, and the need for continued infrastructure development—particularly subway construction in Tokyo—remained strong. Although privatization encountered opposition, the Teito Rapid Transit Authority was included in the reform process alongside other public entities, such as the Metropolitan Expressway Public Corporation, which was also slated for privatization. At this stage, the name of the successor entity was effectively determined, as the legislation specified the designation Tokyo Metro Co., Ltd.

== Route ==
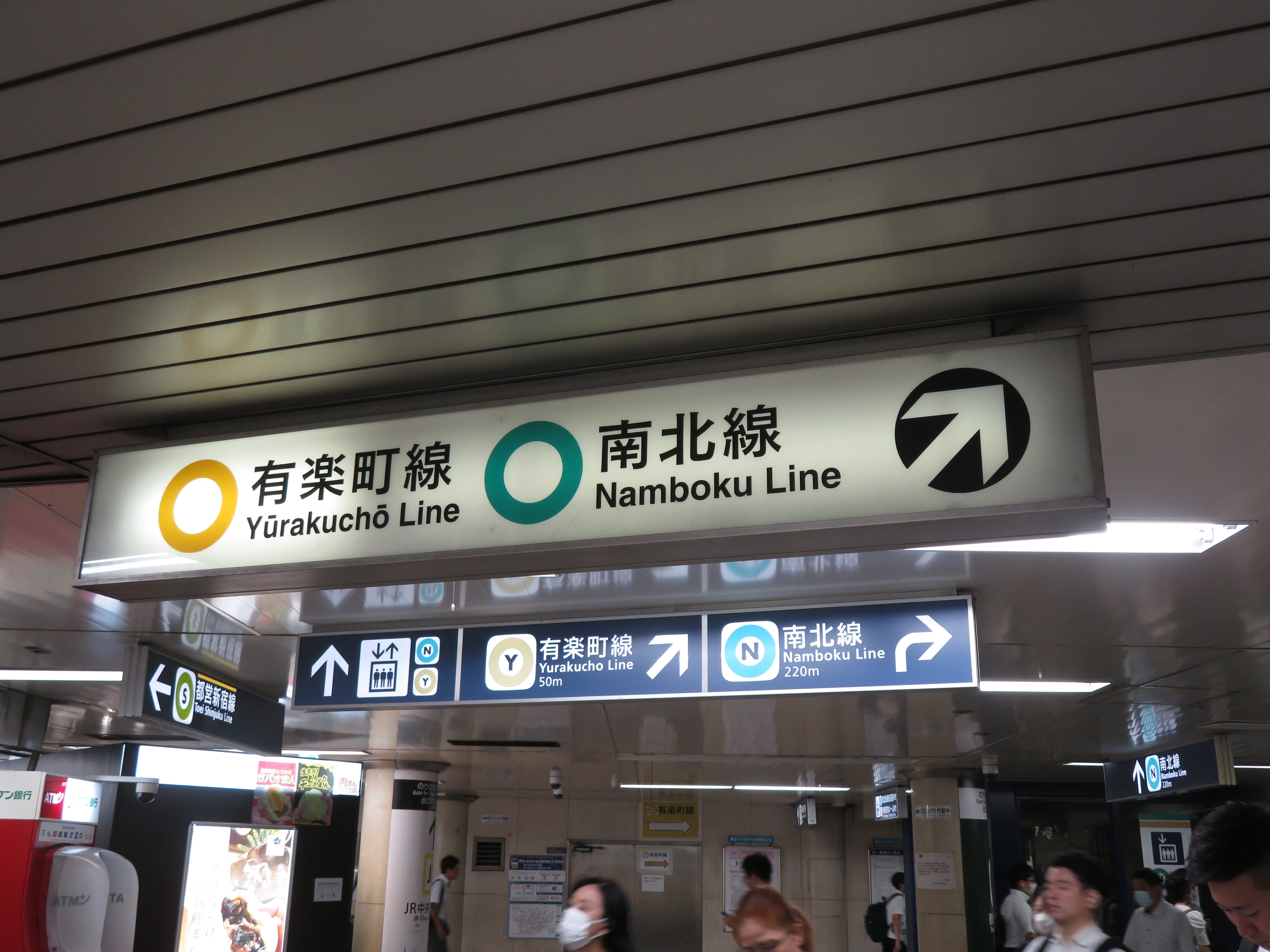
Teito Rapid Transit Authority–era ticket gate signage at Ichigaya Station.

As of March 31, 2004

- Ginza Line: Asakusa - Shibuya
- Marunouchi Line: Ikebukuro - Ogikubo and Nakano - sakaue - Honancho
- Hibiya Line: between Kita - Senju and Nakameguro
- Tōzai Line: Nakano - Nishi- Funabashi
- Chiyoda Line: Ayase - Yoyogi-Uehara and Ayase - Kita- Ayase
- Yūrakuchō Line: between Wakoshi and Shinkiba (including the Yurakucho New Line between Kotake-Mukaihara and Ikebukuro )
- Hanzōmon Line: Shibuya - Oshiage
- Namboku Line: Meguro - Akabane-Iwabuchi

== Rolling stock ==
Since its inception, the authority actively adopted advanced railway technologies available at the time, including double-leaf sliding doors, WN drive systems, aluminum-alloy car bodies, armature chopper control, and compartment-style seating. Many of these design and technological choices later influenced rolling stock developed by Japanese National Railways (JNR), its successor companies under the JR Group and private railway operators.

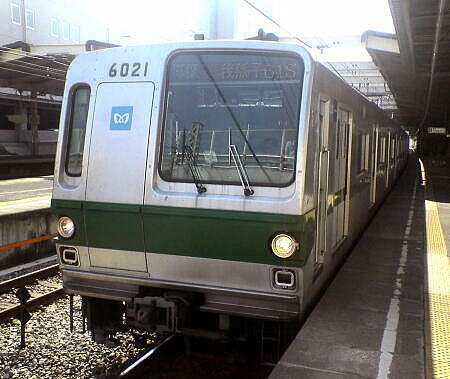
An Eidan 6000 series train displaying the Tokyo Metro “Heart M” logo in place of the former Eidan emblem.

However, the authority was comparatively slow to introduce air conditioning and variable-voltage variable-frequency (VVVF) control systems in its rolling stock. This delay stemmed from a policy preference for improving thermal comfort through air conditioning in stations and tunnels rather than onboard trains, reflecting technical limitations of early vehicle equipment and concerns over waste heat dissipation. As a result, the large-scale introduction of air-conditioned rolling stock did not begin until 1988, considerably later than at other railway operators. By 1996, all trains operated by the authority were fully air-conditioned.

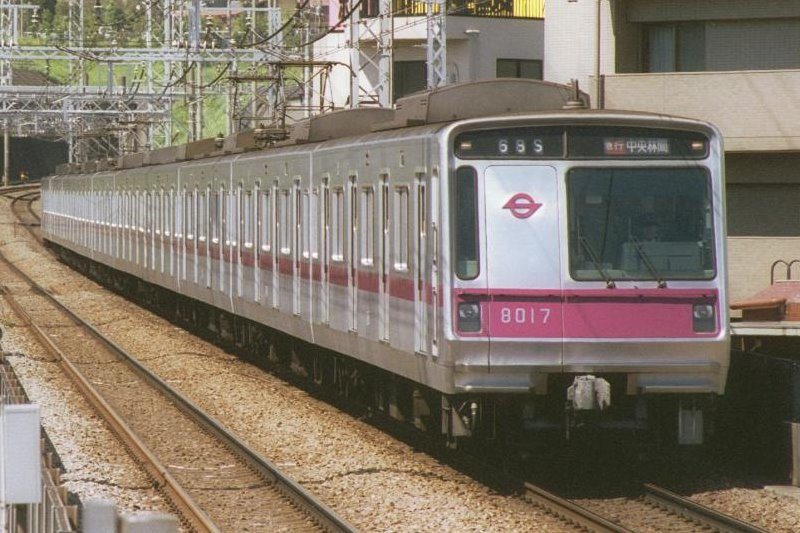
A Teito 8000 series train bearing the emblem.

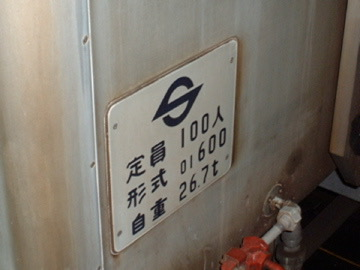
The model plate at the end of an Eidan 01 series train featuring the emblem (c. 2002).

=== Ginza Line ===
- 1000 series (entered service in 1927; withdrawn in 1968; scrapped in 1975)
- 1100 series (withdrawn in 1968)
- 1200 series (withdrawn in 1986)
- 100 series (withdrawn in 1968; scrapped in 1981)
- 200 series (prototype only; ordered but never formed into operational trains)
- 1300 series (withdrawn in 1986)
- 1400 series (withdrawn in 1986)
- 1500 series (withdrawn in 1986)
- 1600 series (withdrawn in 1986)
- 1700 series (withdrawn in 1986)
- 1800 series (withdrawn in 1986)
- 1900 series (withdrawn in 1987)
- 1500N series (withdrawn in 1993)
- 2000 series (withdrawn in 1993; some units were sold to Hitachi Electric Railway and Chōshi Electric Railway)
- 01 series (owned by Tokyo Metro; withdrawn from service in 2017; some units were sold to Kumamoto Electric Railway)

=== Marunouchi Line ===
- 300, 400, 500, and 900 series (withdrawn in 1996; some units were sold to the Buenos Aires Underground in Argentina; following their scrapping there, Tokyo Metro repurchased four cars for preservation. Limited units are still in service and expected to be retired in the mid-2020s. These units are the oldest continuously operating rolling stock globally.)
- 100 series (branch line use; withdrawn in 1968)
- 2000 series (branch line use; withdrawn in 1993)
- 02 series (owned by Tokyo Metro; branch line services ended in 2022, with main line services scheduled to end in 2024)

=== Hibiya Line ===
- 3000 series (withdrawn from service in 1994; some units were sold to Nagano Electric Railway and operated as the 3500 series. After their retirement there, one two-car set was returned to Tokyo Metro for preservation)
- 03 series (owned by Tokyo Metro; withdrawn from service in 2020. Some units were sold to Kumamoto Electric Railway, Nagano Electric Railway, Hokuriku Railway, and Jōmō Electric Railway)

=== Tōzai Line ===
- 5000 series (some units remain owned by Tokyo Metro, though revenue service ended in 2007. Some trains were sold to the Tōyō Rapid Railway and operated as the 1000 series, which was withdrawn in 2006. Additional cars from both operators were sold to PT Kereta Api Indonesia)
- 05 series (owned by Tokyo Metro; production continued after privatization. Some units were transferred to the Chiyoda Line or sold to PT Kereta Api Indonesia)

=== Chiyoda Line ===
- 5000 series (operated on the Ayase–Kita-Ayase branch; owned by Tokyo Metro; withdrawn from service in 2014)
- 6000 series (owned by Tokyo Metro; withdrawn from service in 2018. Most units were sold to PT Kereta Api Indonesia; the second train set is preserved in its original Chiyoda Line configuration at the Shinkiba Depot)
- 06 series (owned by Tokyo Metro; withdrawn from service in 2015)

=== Yūrakuchō Line / Yūrakuchō New Line (now Fukutoshin Line) ===
- 7000 series (owned by Tokyo Metro; some units were sold to PT Kereta Api Indonesia. Revenue service ended in 2022, and the first train set is scheduled for preservation in its Fukutoshin Line configuration at the Shinkiba Depot)
- 07 series (all units owned by Tokyo Metro; all cars have since been transferred to the Tōzai Line)

=== Hanzōmon Line ===
- 8000 series (some units remain owned by Tokyo Metro)
- 08 series (all units owned by Tokyo Metro; the final rolling stock series introduced by the Teito Rapid Transit Authority)

=== Namboku Line ===
- 9000 series (all units owned by Tokyo Metro; production continued after privatization)

== See also ==
- Tokyo Underground Railway
- Tokyo Rapid Railway
- Tokyo Metro
