= Tokyo subway =

Part of the rapid transit system in Greater Tokyo, Japan

- Logos of the Tokyo Metro (left) and Toei Subway (right)

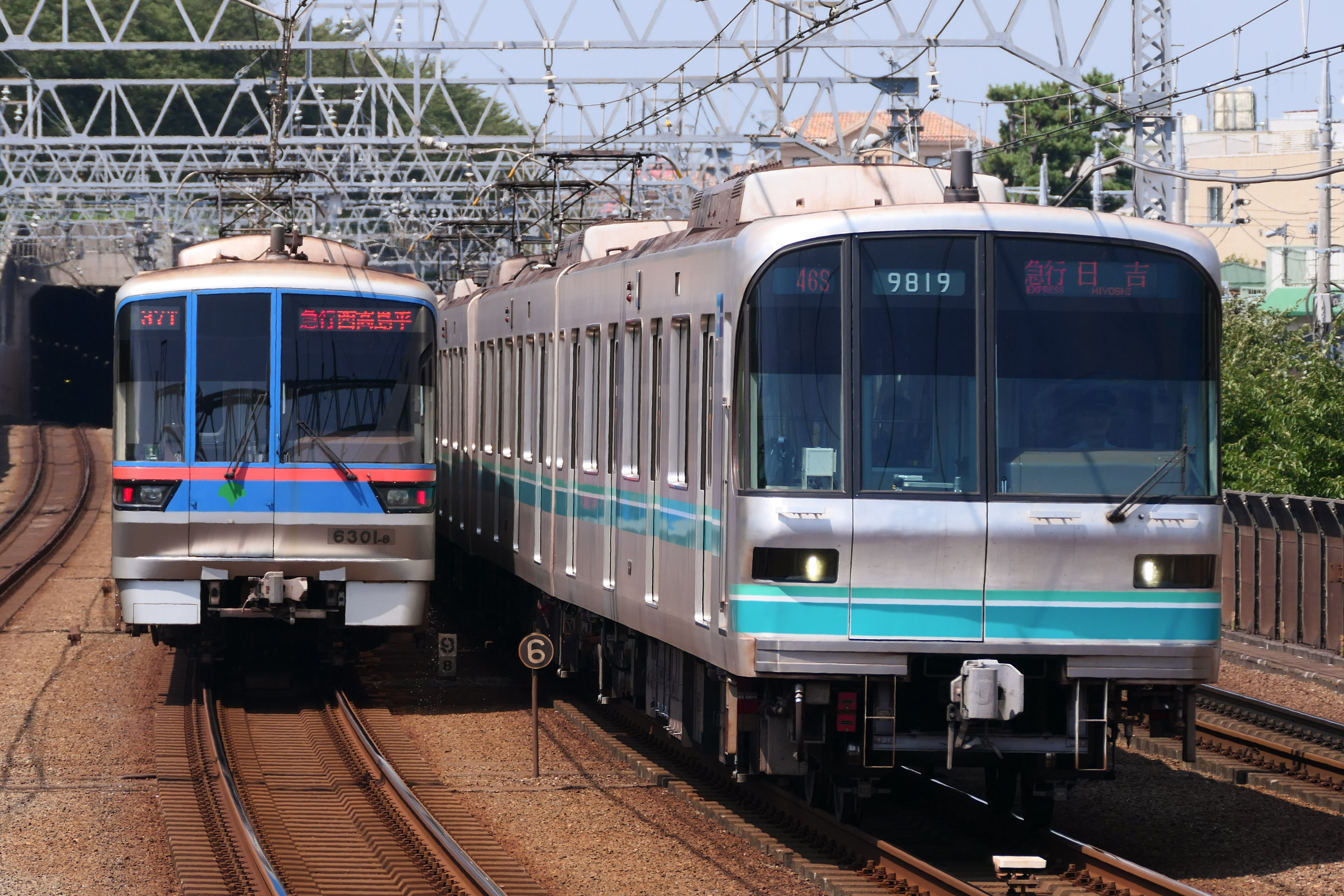
- Toei 6300 series (left) and Tokyo Metro 9000 series (right) trains at Tamagawa Station

Overview
- Locale: Tokyo, Japan
- Transit type: Rapid transit
- Number of lines: 13
- Number of stations: 285
- Daily ridership: Tokyo Metro: 7.04 million (FY 2025); Toei Subway: 2.60 million (FY 2025)
- Annual ridership: 3.921 billion (2019)

Operation
- Began operation: 30 December 1927; 98 years ago
- Operators: Tokyo Metro Co., Ltd. Tokyo Metropolitan Bureau of Transportation

Technical
- System length: 304.1 km (189.0 mi)
- Track gauge: 1,067 mm (3 ft 6 in), 1,435 mm for Ginza, Marunouchi, Toei Asakusa & Toei Ōedo Lines, 1,372 mm for Toei Shinjuku Line
System map

The Tokyo subway consists of two major subway systems (Japanese: 地下鉄, Hepburn: chikatetsu), the Tokyo Metro and the Toei Subway. Most of the network is located in the 23 special wards, with portions extending into Chiba and Saitama Prefectures. The subways are one part of Greater Tokyo's passenger rail network, with through service further connecting the subway to suburban railways in Western Tokyo and Kanagawa Prefecture.

== Networks ==
There are two primary subway operators in Tokyo:

- Tokyo Metro – run by the Tokyo Metro Co., Ltd., formerly a statutory corporation called the Teito Rapid Transit Authority (TRTA), it was converted into a kabushiki gaisha (joint-stock company) in 2004. It currently operates 180 stations on nine lines and 195.0 kilometers (121.2 mi) of route.
- Toei Subway – run by the Tokyo Metropolitan Bureau of Transportation, an agency of the Tokyo Metropolitan Government. It operates 106 stations on four lines and 109.0 kilometers (67.7 mi) of route.

As of 2023, the combined subway network of the Tokyo and Toei metros comprises 286 stations and 13 lines covering a total system length of 304.0 kilometers (188.9 mi). The Tokyo Metro and Toei networks together carry a combined average of over eight million passengers daily. Despite being ranked second overall in worldwide subway usage (after the Shanghai Metro) as of 2019, subways make up a relatively small fraction of heavy rail rapid transit in Tokyo alone—only 286 out of 938 railway stations, as of 2020. The Tokyo subway at 8.7 million daily passengers only represents 22% of Tokyo's 40 million daily rail passengers (see Transport in Greater Tokyo). Other urban commuter rail systems include Keikyu Corporation (formerly the Keihin Electric Express Railway), Keio Corporation, Keisei Electric Railway, Odakyu Electric Railway, Seibu Railway, Tobu Railway and Tokyu Corporation.

Sign	Line	Japanese	Length	Daily ridership (FY2024) (Note: Source is a sum of station ridership which includes station exits, station entries, transfers, passengers on trains entering and exiting the Subway Line on through operation services. As such the unique ridership of each line is the total ridership divided by 2.)	Opened
Tokyo Metro
	Chiyoda Line	千代田線	24.0 km	1,175,901	1969
	Chiyoda Line Branch Line	千代田線分岐線	2.6 km	1,175,901	1979
	Fukutoshin Line	副都心線	20.2 km	555,507	1994
	Ginza Line	銀座線	14.3 km	987,403	1927
	Hanzōmon Line	半蔵門線	16.8 km	972,558	1978
	Hibiya Line	日比谷線	20.3 km	1,134,161	1961
	Marunouchi Line	丸ノ内線	27.4 km	1,260,470	1954
	Marunouchi Line Branch Line	丸ノ内線分岐線	3.2 km	1,260,470	1962
Namboku Line (Tokyo Metro)	Namboku Line	南北線	21.3 km	518,235	1991
Tōzai Line (Tokyo Metro)	Tōzai Line	東西線	30.8 km	1,304,557	1964
Yūrakuchō Line (Tokyo Metro)	Yūrakuchō Line	有楽町線	28.3 km	1,046,097	1974
Toei Subway
Toei Asakusa Line	Asakusa Line	浅草線	18.3 km	728,889	1960
Toei Mita Line	Mita Line	三田線	26.5 km	646,355	1968
Toei Shinjuku Line	Shinjuku Line	新宿線	23.5 km	740,380	1978
Toei Ōedo Line	Ōedo Line	大江戸線	40.7 km	888,957	1991

In addition, but not formally designated as subways:

- The Tokyo Waterfront Area Rapid Transit (TWR) operates a single mostly-underground line with eight stations, and 200,200 daily passengers in 2010.
- The Saitama Rapid Railway Line, which is essentially an extension of the Tokyo Metro Namboku Line, operates a single mostly-underground line with eight stations.
- The Tōyō Rapid Railway Line, which is essentially an extension of the Tokyo Metro Tōzai Line, operates a single underground/elevated line with nine stations.

The Yokohama Subway and the Minatomirai Line also operate in the Greater Tokyo Area, but they are not directly connected to the Tokyo subway network. However, direct through services from the Tokyo Metro Fukutoshin Line regularly run into Yokohama's Minatomirai Line via the Tōkyū Tōyoko Line.

== History ==
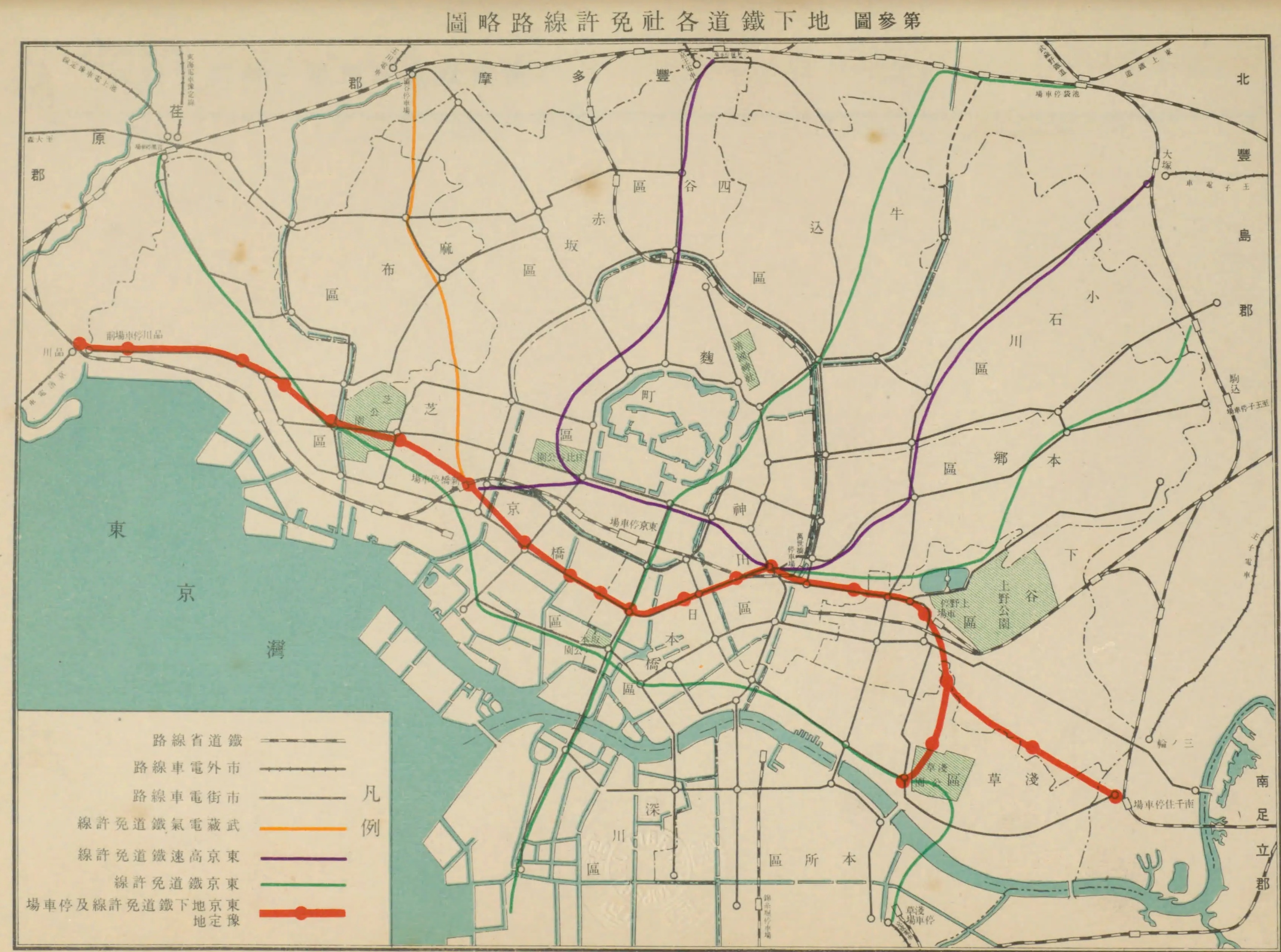
Proposed Tokyo Subway route map (1920)

The history of Tokyo Subway

- 1915: The Ministry of Communications opened an underground tunnel exclusively for mail transport between Tokyo Station and the Tokyo Central Post Office. The tunnel originally contained rail tracks, which were abandoned and removed in 1941. The passage was subsequently repaved and converted for use by electric traction vehicles. The tunnel continued to be used for mail transport until 1978, when operations ceased.
- 1927: Tokyo Underground Railway Co., Ltd. (東京地下鉄道株式会社) opens Japan's first underground line of the subway Ginza Line on 30 December 1927, publicizing it as "the first underground railway in the Orient." The distance of the line is only 2.2 km between Ueno and Asakusa.

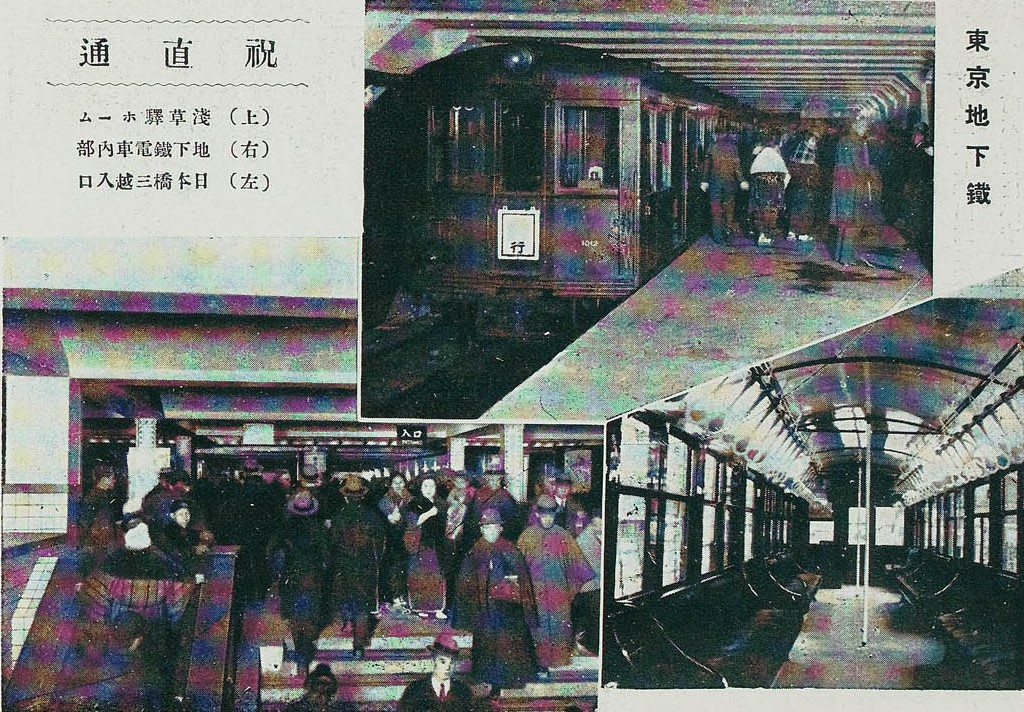
Tokyo Subway System in the 1930s. Top: Asakusa Station platform; Left: The Nihonbashi Mitsukoshi department store entrance at Mitsukoshimae Station; Right: Interior of a subway train.

- 1938: Tokyo Rapid Railway Co., Ltd. (東京高速鉄道株式会社) opens its subway system between Aoyama 6-chome (present-day Omotesando) and Toranomon.
- 1939: Tokyo Rapid Transit Railway extends its line from Toranomon to Shimbashi, and starts an reciprocal operation with Tokyo Underground Railway.
- 1941: During World War II, the two subway companies merge under the name Teito Rapid Transit Authority (帝都高速度交通営団, Teito Kōsokudo Kōtsu Eidan) by the local government.
- 1954: The Marunouchi Line, the first subway line after World War II, opens between Ikebukuro and Ochanomizu.
- 1960: Toei Subway Line 1, present-day Toei Asakusa Line, opens between Oshiage and Asakusa.
- 1968: Toei Subway Line 6 (currently the Toei Mita Line) opens between Shimura Station (renamed Takashimadaira Station in 1969) and Sugamo Station.
- 1991: The Tokyo Metro Namboku Line opens.
- 1995: On 20 March, the Tokyo subway sarin attack occurs on the Marunouchi, Hibiya, and Chiyoda Lines during the morning rush hour. Over 5,000 people are injured and 13 people are killed. All three lines cease operation for the whole day.
- 2000: The Namboku Line opens between Tameike-sanno Station and Meguro Station and the Toei Mita Line opens between Mita Station and Meguro Station, with both lines sharing infrastructure between Meguro Station and Shirokane-takanawa Station. Additionally, both lines start through service with the Tokyu Meguro Line.
- 2004: Teito Rapid Transit Authority is privatized and renamed Tokyo Metro Co., Ltd.
- 2008: The Fukutoshin Line opens.
- 2013: The Fukutoshin Line starts through service with the Tokyu Toyoko Line.
- 2023: The Toei Mita Line, the Namboku Line, and the Fukutoshin Line start through service with the Tōkyū Shin-Yokohama Line, the Sōtetsu Shin-Yokohama Line, the Sōtetsu Main Line and the Izumino Line via the Tokyu Meguro Line (Toei Mita Line and Namboku Line) and the Tokyu Toyoko Line (Fukutoshin Line).

== System administration ==
Both the Tokyo Metro and Toei Subway systems are closely integrated with a unified system of line colors, line codes, and station numbers. However, the separate administration of metro systems has some ramifications:

- For single rides across Metro and Toei systems, a special transfer ticket is required. It costs 70 yen less than the sum of the Metro fare and the Toei fare, calculated based on the shortest possible route between the origin and destination stations. The Passnet magnetic card system simplified such ticketing problems, by allowing one stored-fare card to be used on most of the rail operators in the Greater Tokyo Area (with the noticeable exception of JR East which continued to use its own Suica system). The new Pasmo system was introduced in 2007 and completely replaced the Passnet in 2008, finally allowing for one unified stored fare system for most of the Tokyo transit system, including JR East. The fare charged by the stored fare system may be slightly less than for users of paper tickets, as fares are calculated in ¥1 increments on stored fare cards whereas paper tickets are calculated at ¥10 increments.
- The systems represent the metro network differently in station, train, and customer information diagrams. For example, the Toei map represents the Toei Ōedo Line as a circle in the centre, whereas the Tokyo Metro's map saves the central ring line for the Marunouchi Line and the JR Yamanote Line. As well, each system's lines are generally rendered with thicker lines on their respective system maps.

== Reciprocal operation ==
As is common with Japanese subway systems, many above-ground and underground lines in the Greater Tokyo Area operate through services with the Tokyo Metro and Toei lines. Through services operate on all lines except Tokyo Metro Ginza and Marunouchi Lines and Toei Ōedo Line. In a broader sense they are considered a part of the Tokyo subway network, allowing it to reach farther out into the suburbs.

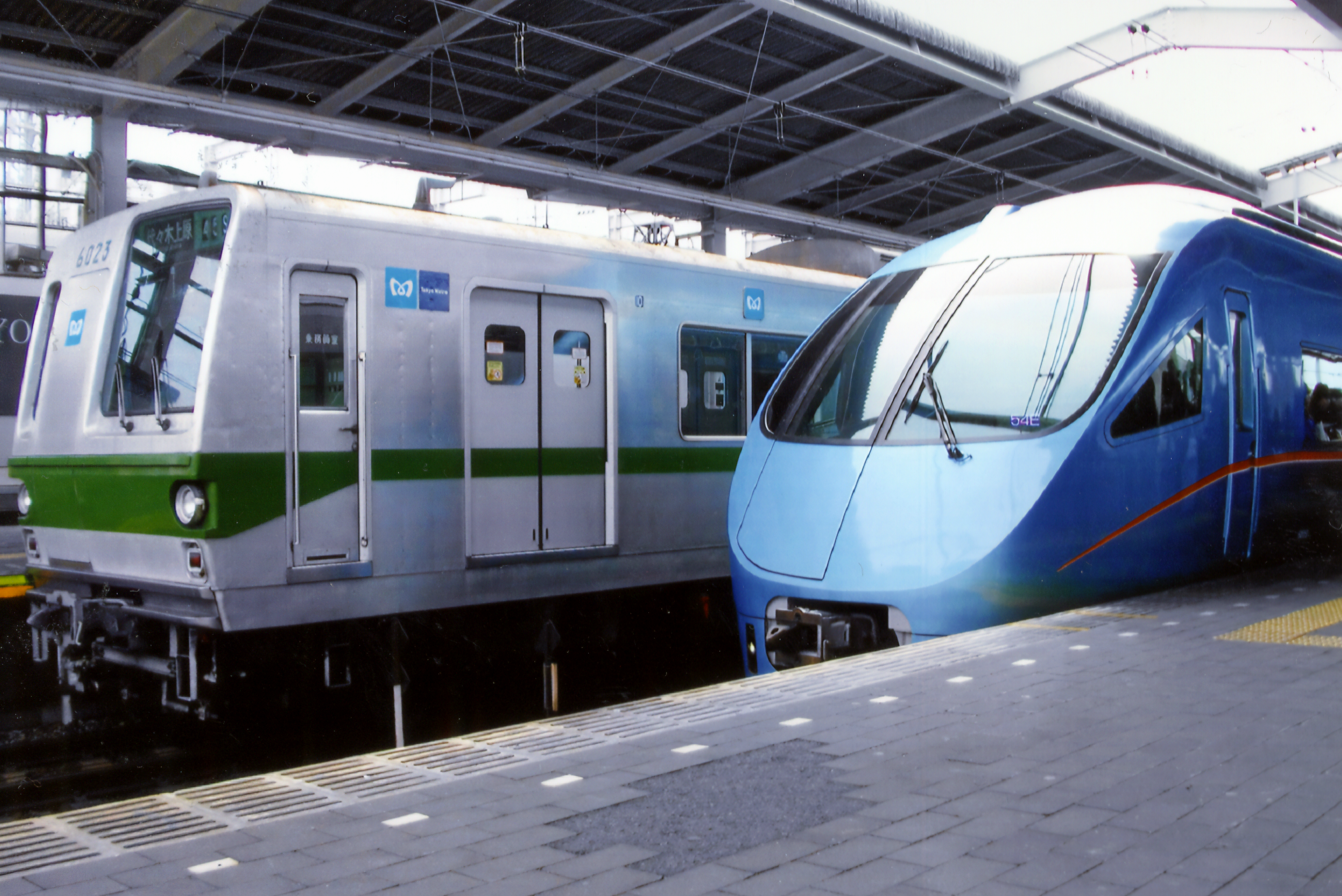
Tokyo Metro 6000 series and Odakyu 60000 series MSE Romancecar EMUs at Yoyogi-Uehara

=== Tokyo Metro ===
	Line	Through lines
H	Hibiya Line	Tobu Skytree Line and Tōbu Nikkō Line (Kita-Senju to Tōbu-Dōbutsu-Kōen and Minami-Kurihashi)
T	Tōzai Line	JR East Chūō-Sōbu Line (Chūō Main Line) (Nakano to Mitaka)
T	Tōzai Line	JR East Chūō-Sōbu Line (Sōbu Main Line) (Nishi-Funabashi to Tsudanuma)
T	Tōzai Line	Toyo Rapid Line (Nishi-Funabashi to Tōyō-Katsutadai)
C	Chiyoda Line	Odakyu Odawara Line and Odakyu Tama Line (Yoyogi-Uehara to Karakida and Hon-Atsugi)
C	Chiyoda Line	JR East Jōban Line (Ayase to Toride)
Y	Yūrakuchō Line	Tōbu Tōjō Line (Wakōshi to Shinrinkōen)
Y	Yūrakuchō Line	Seibu Ikebukuro Line via the Seibu Yūrakuchō Line (Kotake-Mukaihara Station to Hannō)
Z	Hanzōmon Line	Tōkyū Den-en-toshi Line (Shibuya to Chūō-Rinkan)
Z	Hanzōmon Line	Tobu Skytree Line, Tōbu Nikkō Line and Tobu Isesaki Line (Oshiage to Tōbu-Dōbutsu-Kōen, Minami-Kurihashi and Kuki)
N	Namboku Line	Tokyu Meguro Line (Meguro to Hiyoshi)
N	Namboku Line	Saitama Rapid Railway Line (Akabane-Iwabuchi to Urawa-Misono)
F	Fukutoshin Line	Tobu and Seibu line (same stations served as the Yūrakuchō Line)
F	Fukutoshin Line	Minatomirai Line via Tōkyū Tōyoko Line (Shibuya to Motomachi-Chūkagai)

=== Toei Subway ===
	Line	Through lines
A	Asakusa Line	Keikyu Kurihama Line and Keikyu Airport Line both via the Keikyu Main Line (Sengakuji to Haneda Airport (Tokyo International Airport) or Misakiguchi)
A	Asakusa Line	Keisei Oshiage Line, Keisei Main Line, Hokuso Railway Line, Keisei Higashi-Narita Line and Shibayama Railway Line (Oshiage to Narita Airport, Inba-Nihon-Idai or Shibayama-Chiyoda)
I	Mita Line	Tokyu Meguro Line (Meguro to Hiyoshi)
S	Shinjuku Line	Keio New Line and Keio Sagamihara Line both via the Keiō Line (Shinjuku to Hashimoto or Takaosanguchi)

== See also ==
- Tokyo Metro
  - List of Tokyo Metro stations
- Toei Subway
  - List of Toei Subway stations
- Tokyo Underground Railway
- Tokyo Rapid Railway
- List of urban rail systems in Japan
- Tokyo Metropolitan Subway Construction Company
