= Tokyo Rapid Railway =

Rail operator in Japan (1934–1941)

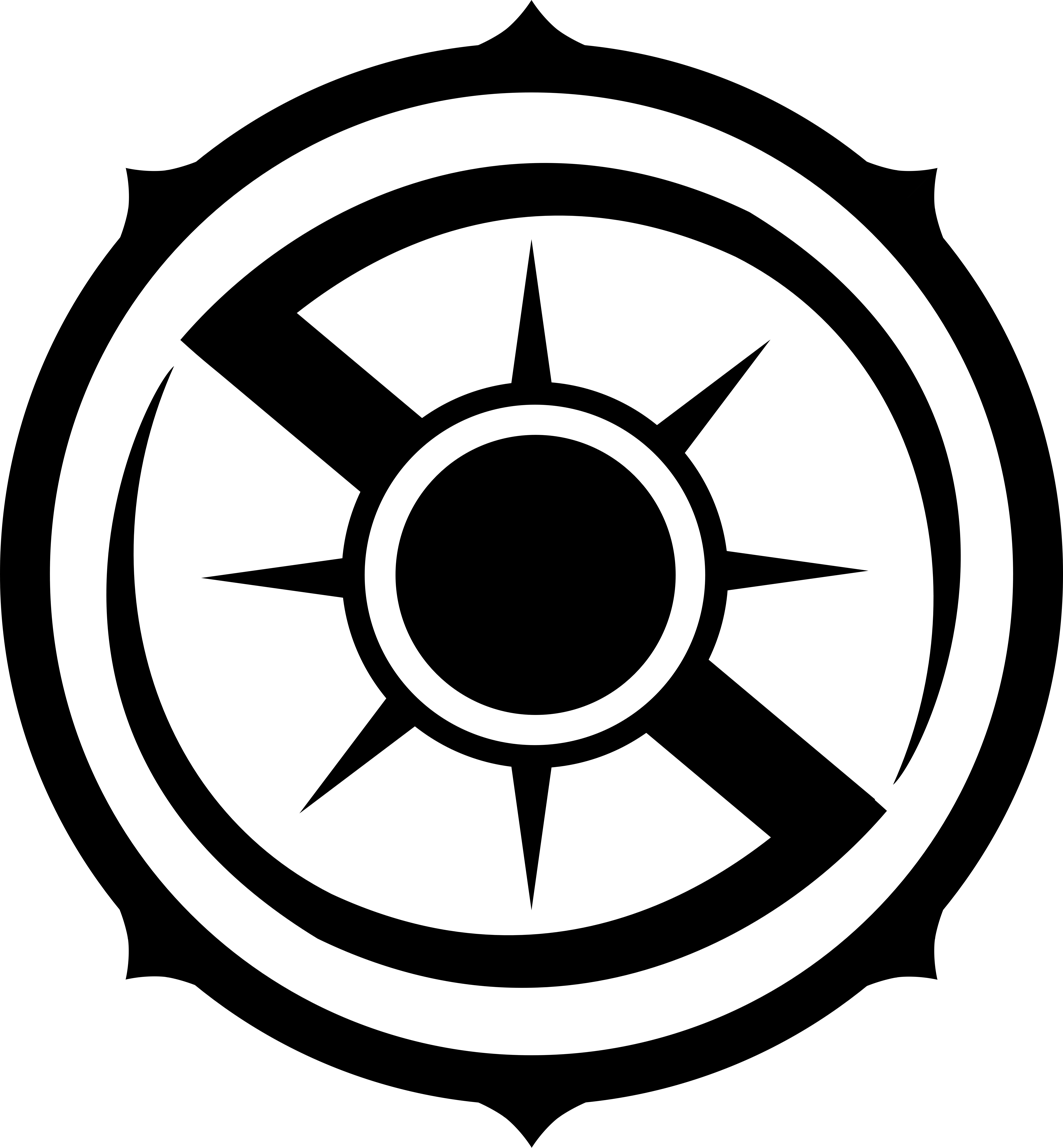
- Native name: 東京高速鉄道
- Company type: Private
- Founded: 1934
- Defunct: 1941
- Fate: Acquired by Teito Rapid Transit Authority with Tokyo Underground Railway
- Successor: Teito Rapid Transit Authority
- Headquarters: Akasaka, Tokyo, Japan
- Area served: Tokyo City
- Services: Rail transport

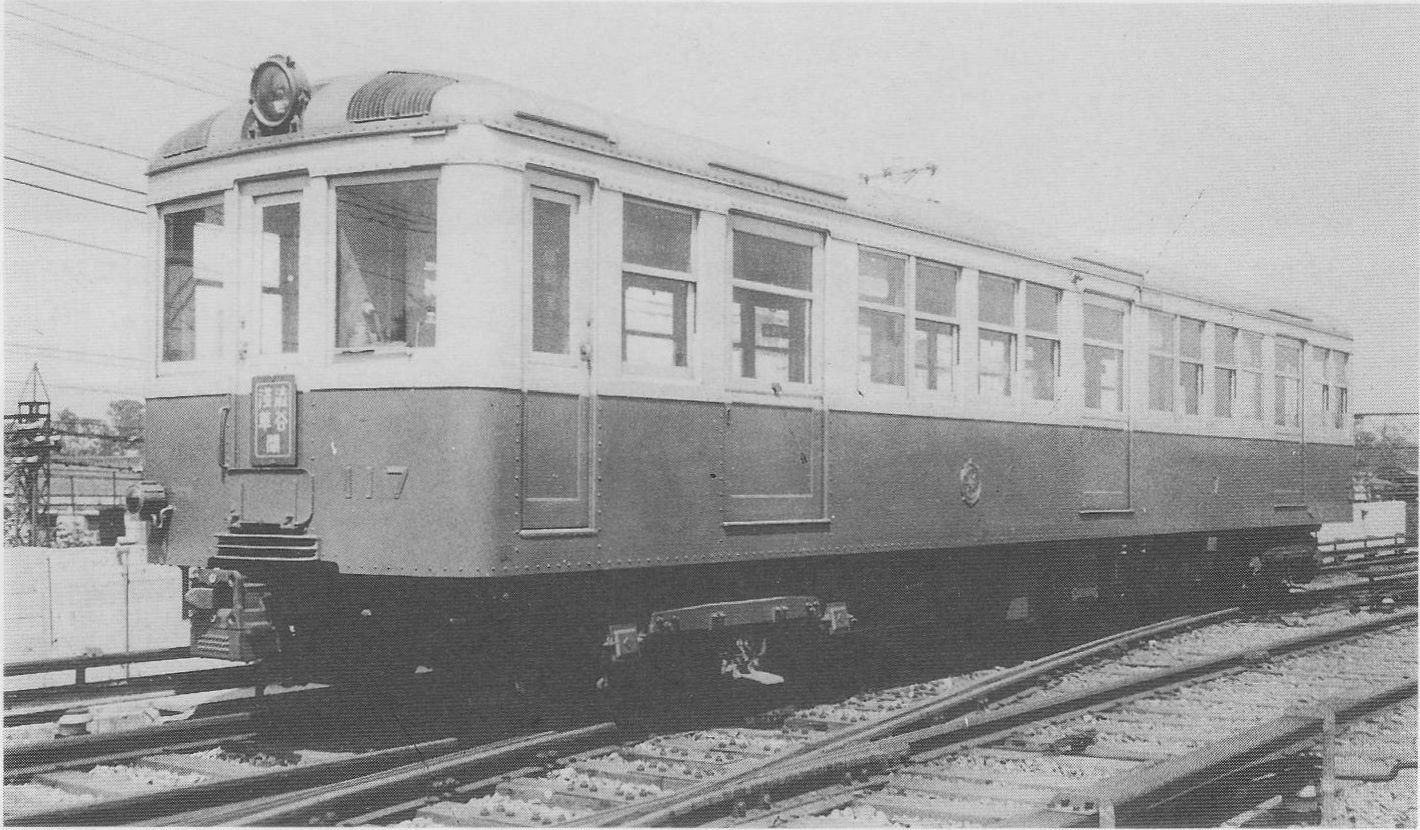
A Tokyo Rapid Railway 100 series train at Shibuya depot.

The Tokyo Rapid Railway (Japanese: 東京高速鉄道) was a private railway operator that built and operated the section of the present-day Tokyo Metro Ginza Line between Shimbashi Station and Shibuya Station from 1934 to 1941.

Together with the Tokyo Underground Railway, which opened the line between Asakusa Station and Shimbashi Station as Japan’s first subway section, it formed one of the two principal predecessors of the modern Tokyo Subway.

In 1941, following the outbreak of World War II, it was ultimately merged with the Tokyo Underground Railway into the Teito Rapid Transit Authority under the Land Transportation Business Adjustment Law.

== History ==
Originally, Tokyo City planned to construct a municipally operated subway in line with its policy of public management of urban transportation. In 1925, the city obtained licenses for four of the five subway lines designated in a Ministry of Home Affairs notification (大正14年内務省告示第56号); however, implementation was delayed due to budgetary constraints. Meanwhile, a group of private entrepreneurs, encouraged by the success of the Tokyo Underground Railway, concluded that subway operations could be commercially viable and petitioned for the transfer of the subway construction licenses held by Tokyo City. The city approved the request, and on September 5, 1934, Tokyo Rapid Railway Co., Ltd. was established to undertake the construction and operation of the lines.

Under the terms of the license transfer, the company was originally required to be established by the previous year, but this was postponed because of funding difficulties. The company was ultimately founded with the participation of Keita Gotō, president of the Tokyo–Yokohama Electric Railway (the predecessor of Tokyu Corporation), who joined as a promoter and subsequently assumed a leading role in its management.

The sections transferred under the license comprised the Shibuya–Tokyo (Marunouchi) Line, designated as Line 3, and the Shinjuku–Tokyo (Tsukiji) Line, designated as Line 4, as specified in Ministry of Home Affairs Notification No. 56. However, Tokyo Rapid Railway began construction from Shibuya, where the terminal of the Tokyo–Yokohama Electric Railway was located. On November 18, 1938, it opened the section between Aoyama-Rokuchōme Station (now Omotesando Station) and Toranomon Station, built as a pair of single-track tunnels.

Because of financial difficulties at the time of construction, platform lengths were designed to accommodate only three-car trains, and construction costs were significantly reduced in comparison with earlier subway projects such as the Tokyo Underground Railway and the Osaka Municipal Electric Bureau’s subway (now the Osaka Metro Midosuji Line). As a consequence, when some Ginza Line trains were lengthened to four or five cars in the 1950s, problems such as doors opening beyond the platforms occurred, necessitating subsequent platform extension works.

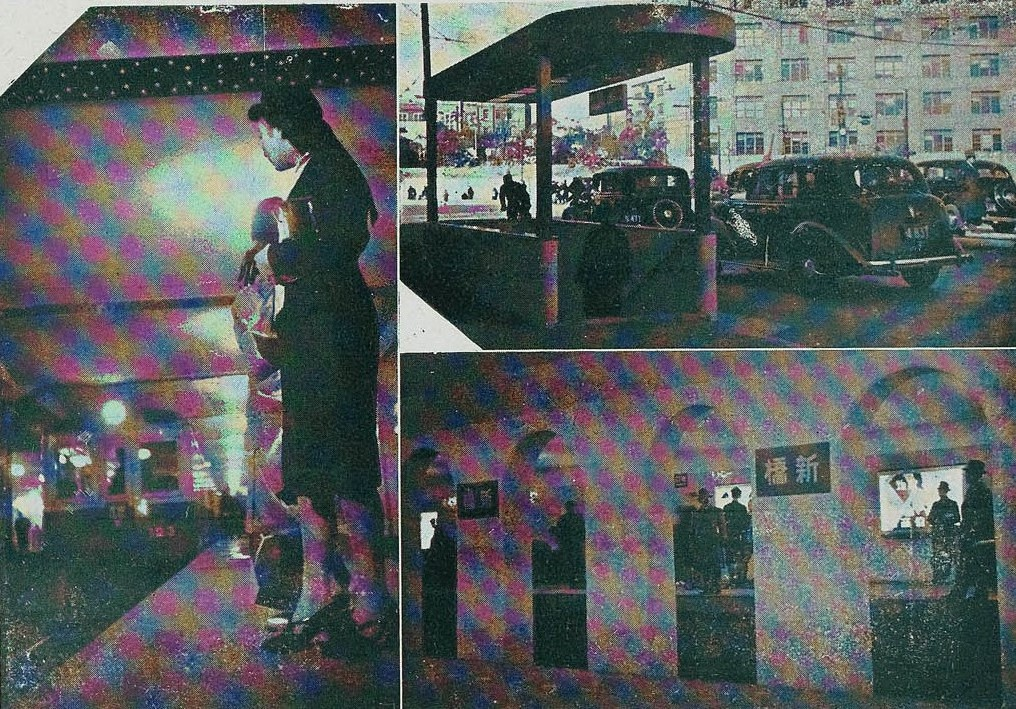
Stations of the Tokyo Rapid Railway in the late 1930s. Left: Aoyama-rokuchōme Station platform Top Right: Toranomon Station entrance Bottom Right: Shimbashi Station platform.

On December 20, 1938, the line opened between Shibuya Station and Aoyama-rokuchōme Station. The Tokyo Rapid Railway Shibuya Line was initially planned to extend from Toranomon to Shimbashi Station and to provide through service with the Tokyo Underground Railway, which already operated between Shimbashi and Asakusa. However, the Tokyo Underground Railway, led by Tokuji Hayakawa, opposed this plan while pursuing its own expansion toward Shinagawa, citing operational difficulties. Following intervention by the Ministry of Railways, the two companies reached an agreement in May 1935 to implement through services, followed by a construction agreement the next year.

Relations later deteriorated as Keita Goto shifted from cooperation to confrontation, acquiring shares in both the Keihin Electric Railway and the Tokyo Underground Railway and seeking to consolidate control of the subway business. This led to a prolonged struggle for management rights between the Goto and Hayakawa factions, which ultimately required mediation by the Ministry of Home Affairs. The dispute was settled with both figures withdrawing from direct involvement in subway management, effectively ending Hayakawa’s leadership and placing Tokyo Rapid Railway in a dominant position, a development that shaped the eventual integration of the two companies into the Teito Rapid Transit Authority.

On January 15, 1939, the Tokyo Rapid Railway extended its line from Toranomon Station to Shimbashi Station, completing continuous service between Shibuya and Shimbashi.

=== Dissolution ===
On July 4, 1941, under the Land Transportation Business Adjustment Law, enacted to reorganize and control transportation enterprises during wartime, the Tokyo Underground Railway and the Tokyo Rapid Railway were merged with the Keihin Underground Railway, which remained uncompleted and existed largely as a paper company, to form the Teito Rapid Transit Authority.

In June 1942, following the establishment of the Teito Rapid Transit Authority, construction commenced on the section between Yotsuya-mitsuke and Akasaka-mitsuke, which had been planned by the former Tokyo Rapid Railway as part of the Shinjuku Line. However, as the situation in the WWII deteriorated, construction was suspended in June 1944. After the war, the subway plans were revised to function as part of postwar urban reconstruction, and this section was eventually opened in March 1959 as part of the Marunouchi Line.

== Rolling stock ==
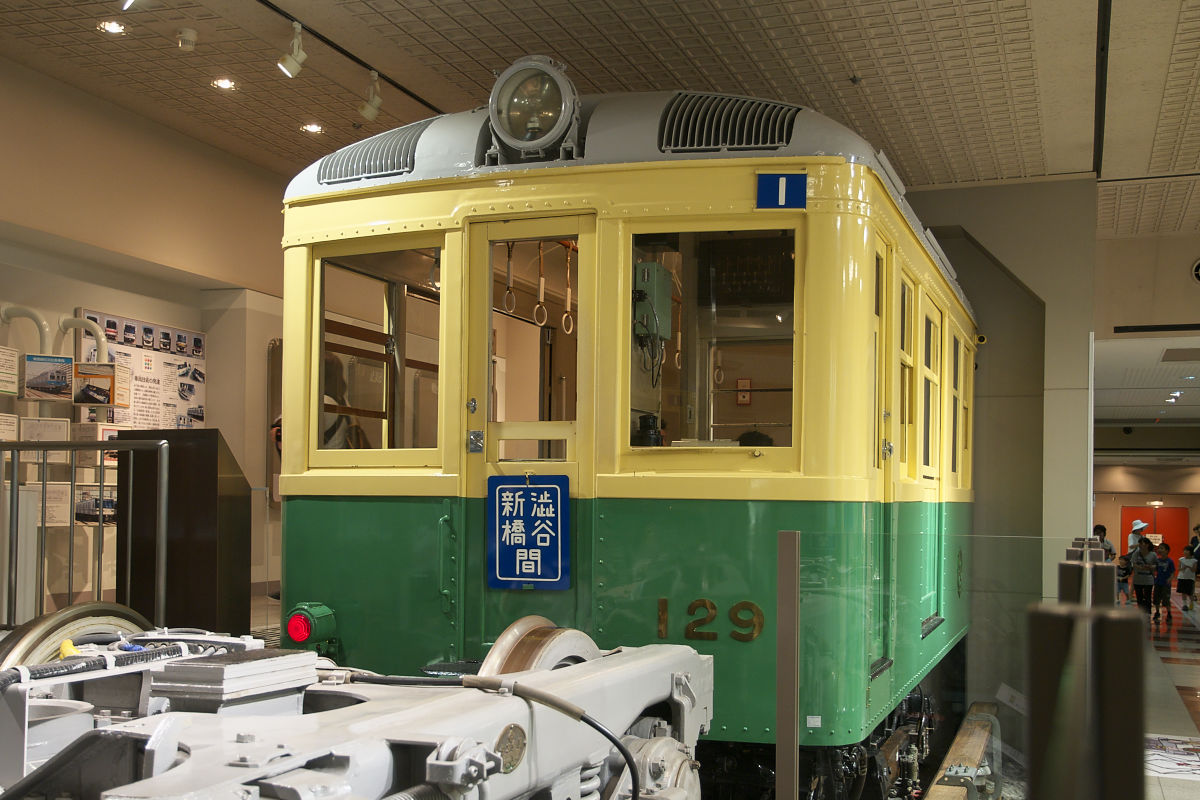
Tokyo Rapid Transit Railway 100 Series Train

The 100 series was later inherited by the Teito Rapid Transit Authority, with some cars transferred to the Marunouchi Line, where they were retired in 1968. One car was cut down and restored to its original appearance and is now preserved at the Tokyo Metro Museum.

== Buses ==
Tokyo Rapid Railway briefly operated a bus system through its involvement in a complex series of mergers and acquisitions among early Tokyo bus operators during the interwar period.

The origins of this bus network trace back to the Johoku Bus Association (城北乗合自動車組合), established in 1926, which gradually expanded routes in northern Tokyo before being acquired by the Oji Electric Tramway (王子電気軌道) in 1930 and reorganized as the Oji Circular Bus (王子環状乗合自動車). During the early 1930s, the network expanded significantly through extensions toward Oji, Tabata, and surrounding districts. In parallel, Oji Electric Tramway also absorbed several independent operators, notably Hibiya Bus (日比谷乗合自動車) and DAT Bus (ダット乗合自動車), both of which had developed extensive urban bus routes connecting major hubs such as Ichigaya, Shimbashi, Waseda, Mejiro, and Takadanobaba. These companies underwent repeated reorganizations, fare reforms, and route integrations, gradually forming a broad but fragmented bus system in central and northern Tokyo.

In 1936, Oji Circular Bus, Hibiya Bus, and DAT Bus were merged to form the Tokyo Circular Bus Company (東京環状乗合自動車). After further corporate changes, Tokyo Rapid Railway acquired control of the company in 1940, marking its long-anticipated entry into the bus business, with Keita Goto assuming a leadership role. However, this expansion was short-lived. Under wartime transportation controls imposed by the Land Transportation Business Adjustment Act, the government ordered the transfer of the company to Tokyo City in 1941. In 1942, the Tokyo Municipal Electric Bureau absorbed the entire operation and dissolved the company, with its routes and facilities subsequently incorporated into the municipal bus system that later became part of the Toei Bus network.

== See also ==
- Tokyo Underground Railway
- Tokyo Metro
  - Teito Rapid Transit Authority
  - Tokyo Metro Ginza Line
- Tokyu Corporation
