= Tokyo Underground Railway =

Rail operator in Japan (1920–1941)

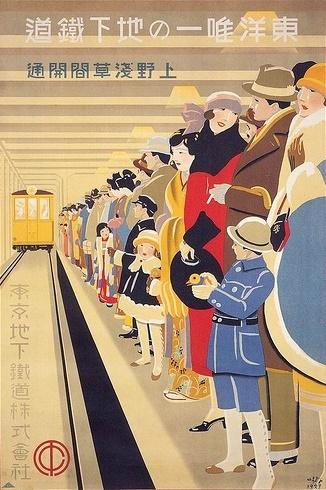
"The only underground railway in the Orient": advertising poster promoting the opening of the Tokyo Underground Railway between Ueno and Asakusa in 1927.

The Tokyo Underground Railway (Japanese: 東京地下鉄道) was a railway operator that once operated underground railways, trams and buses in Tokyo City, Tokyo Prefecture, Japan from 1920 to 1941. It is considered a precursor to the present-day Tokyo Metro Co., Ltd.

Founded in August 1920 by Noritsugu Hayakawa, known as the "father of the subway", the company began construction of what is now the Tokyo Metro Ginza Line between Asakusa and Shimbashi in 1925. It was the first company to build a subway line in Japan and in Asia. Together with the Tokyo Rapid Railway, which constructed the Ginza Line section between Shimbashi and Shibuya, it is considered a precursor to the present-day Tokyo Metro.

In 1941, following the outbreak of World War II, it was merged with the Tokyo Rapid Railway into semi-public Teito Rapid Transit Authority under the Land Transportation Business Adjustment Law.

== History ==
=== Establishment ===
On July 18, 1917, an application was submitted for a license to construct the Tokyo Underground Light Rail (東京軽便地下鉄道) between Takanawa Minamimachi (present-day Shinagawa) and Asakusa Koen Hirokoji, as well as between Kurumazaka and Minami-senjumachi. This application covered only the first phase of the project; however, the submitted documents also outlined second- and third-phase plans, envisioning a subway network across central Tokyo to be built solely by the Tokyo Light Subway. Taking advantage of a gap in the application process, Musashino Electric Railway (later the Tokyo Yokohama Electric Railway) applied for subway line licenses in November 1918, followed by the Tokyo Rapid Railway (first generation, later the Odawara Express Railway) in January 1919, and the Tokyo Railway, affiliated with the Mitsui zaibatsu, in February 1919.

On November 17, 1919, the Tokyo Light Subway was granted licenses for the sections between Takanawa Minamimachi and Asakusa Koen Hirokoji, and between Kurumazaka and Minamisenjumachi.

On January 14, 1920, Tokyo City Notification No. 2 designated seven routes under the "Tokyo City Ward Revised High-Speed Railway" plan. The Tokyo Light Subway's licensed route was approved. However, on March 17, licenses were also granted to Musashino Electric Railway, the first-generation Tokyo Rapid Railway, and Tokyo Railway, preventing the Tokyo Light Subway from independently operating a comprehensive subway network.

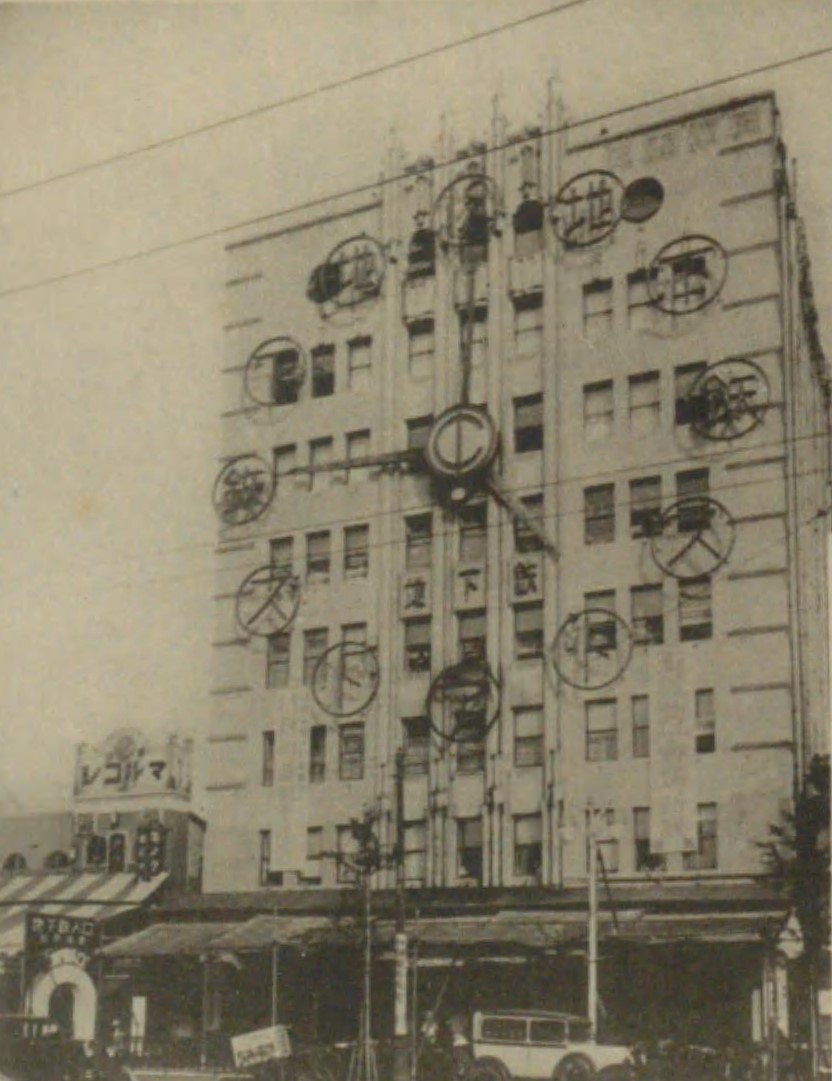
The Ueno Subway Store building, now the headquarters of Tokyo Metro .

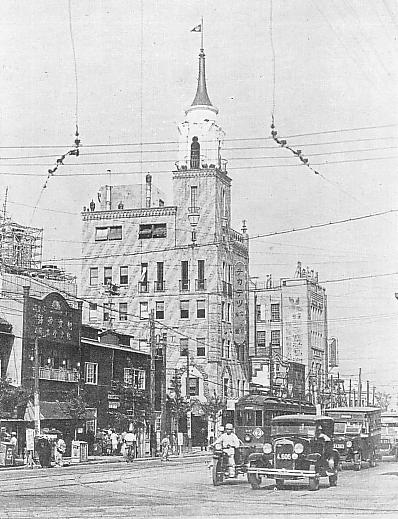
Subway Restaurant building in Asakusa

Line 2 of the revised plan ran from Shibuya through Shimbashi to Asakusa and Minamisenju. Under this arrangement, the Tokyo Light Subway was assigned the Shimbashi–Asakusa/Minamisenju section, while Musashino Electric Railway was assigned the Shibuya–Yurakucho section. Although Musashino Electric Railway never constructed a subway line, its president Keita Goto, formerly of the Tokyo Yokohama Electric Railway, later joined the second-generation Tokyo Rapid Railway and became a key rival to the Tokyo Light Subway, later known as the Tokyo Underground Railway. On August 29, 1920, the Tokyo Underground Railway was established, assuming the route license previously held by the Tokyo Light Subway.

=== The Great Kanto Earthquake and the reconstruction ===
The planning of Tokyo's early subway network was significantly affected by the Great Kantō Earthquake, which occurred on September 1, 1923. In the aftermath of the disaster, Musashino Electric Railway, the Odawara Express Railway, and Tokyo Railroad abandoned their subway construction plans, and their licenses expired by September 1924.

In 1924, the Tokyo Underground Railway submitted applications for licenses to construct subway lines between Gotanda and Kameido, as well as between Yodobashi and Ueno. These applications were later withdrawn on September 4 of the same year, and new applications were filed for routes linking Shibuya to Kanda and Ōtsuka, Meguro to Kyobashi and Asakusa, and Ikebukuro to Nihonbashi and Susaki. Through these proposals, the company once again sought to establish a subway network operated exclusively under its control. However, on December 1, 1924, the license for the section between Kurumazaka and Minamisenjucho expired after the company failed to apply for construction permission by the required deadline.

In 1925, Tokyo City asserted full control over subway development within the city and applied for licenses to construct six subway lines. On March 30, the Ministry of Internal Affairs and Communications issued Notification No. 56, designating five routes under the "Tokyo Metropolitan Planned High-Speed Transportation" framework. Under this plan, the Tokyo Underground Railway's previously licensed route was confirmed as Line 1; however, the three additional routes for which it had applied in September of the previous year were rejected. Instead, Tokyo City was granted licenses for four routes, designated Lines 2 through 5, once again preventing the Tokyo Underground Railway from independently developing a unified subway network.

On May 16, 1925, the Tokyo Underground Railway submitted an application for a license to construct the section between Mita 2-chome, Ōsakichō (Gotanda), and Ikegami, in accordance with Route 1 of the Tokyo Metropolitan Government's planned rapid transit network. Later that year, on September 27, construction commenced on the Ueno–Asakusa section.

=== Subway line extension ===
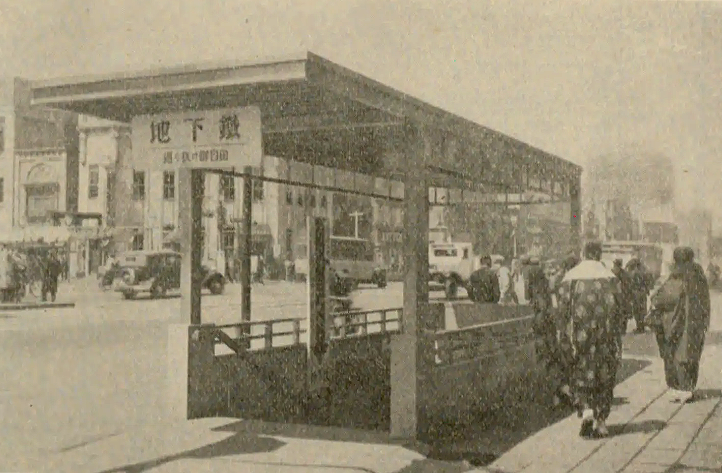
Ginza station in the 1930s

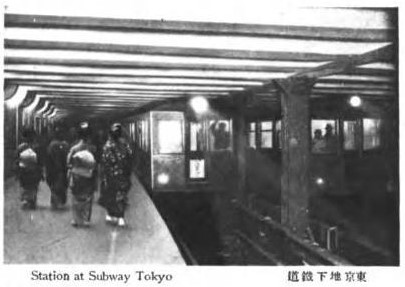
Tokyo Underground Railway in 1937.

On December 30, 1927, the first subway in the Orient opened between Ueno and Asakusa. The construction of this section, including depots, yard tracks, maintenance facilities, substations, rolling stock, and decorative work at stations and related premises, cost approximately JPY6.2 million.

On May 19, 1928, a license was granted for the section between Mita 2-chome and Gotanda. On the same day, the Keihin Electric Railway also obtained a license for the section between Ōsakichō and Kamatachō, known as the Gotanda Line. The license for the Gotanda–Magomemachi section followed on May 20, 1929. On June 21, 1934, the opening of the Ginza–Shimbashi section completed the Asakusa–Shimbashi route, marking a significant expansion of the line.

=== Teito Rapid Transit Authority ===
In August 1925, the second-generation Tokyo Rapid Railway applied for the transfer of licenses for four subway lines (Lines 2 through 5) that were held by Tokyo City. In response, the Tokyo Underground Railway also submitted applications for the same four lines, leading to significant competition between the two companies. Although Tokyo City initially refused to transfer the licenses in September of that year, the Tokyo Rapid Railway continued to press its request. Due to financial constraints that prevented the city from commencing subway construction, it became increasingly difficult to reject these demands, and in October 1932 Tokyo City agreed to transfer the licenses on the condition that the Tokyo Rapid Railway secure the necessary funding.

On September 5, 1934, the Tokyo Rapid Railway was formally established, with Keita Goto of the Tokyo Yokohama Electric Railway among its founders. The company subsequently acquired licenses for portions of Lines 3 and 4 that had previously been held by the Tokyo Metropolitan Government. During his earlier tenure at the Musashino Electric Railway, Goto had planned to construct a subway line between Shibuya and Yurakucho and had obtained a route license, but the project was abandoned following the Great Kantō Earthquake. His involvement in the Tokyo Rapid Railway reflected an effort to revive this plan through Line 3 and extend subway services from Shibuya into central Tokyo. In May 1935, the Tokyo Rapid Railway concluded a through-service agreement with the Tokyo Underground Railway. This was followed in July 1936 by a joint venture agreement between the Tokyo Underground Railway, the Keihin Electric Railway, and the Shonan Electric Railway, both of which later became integral to the development of the Keikyu network north and south of Yokohama, respectively.

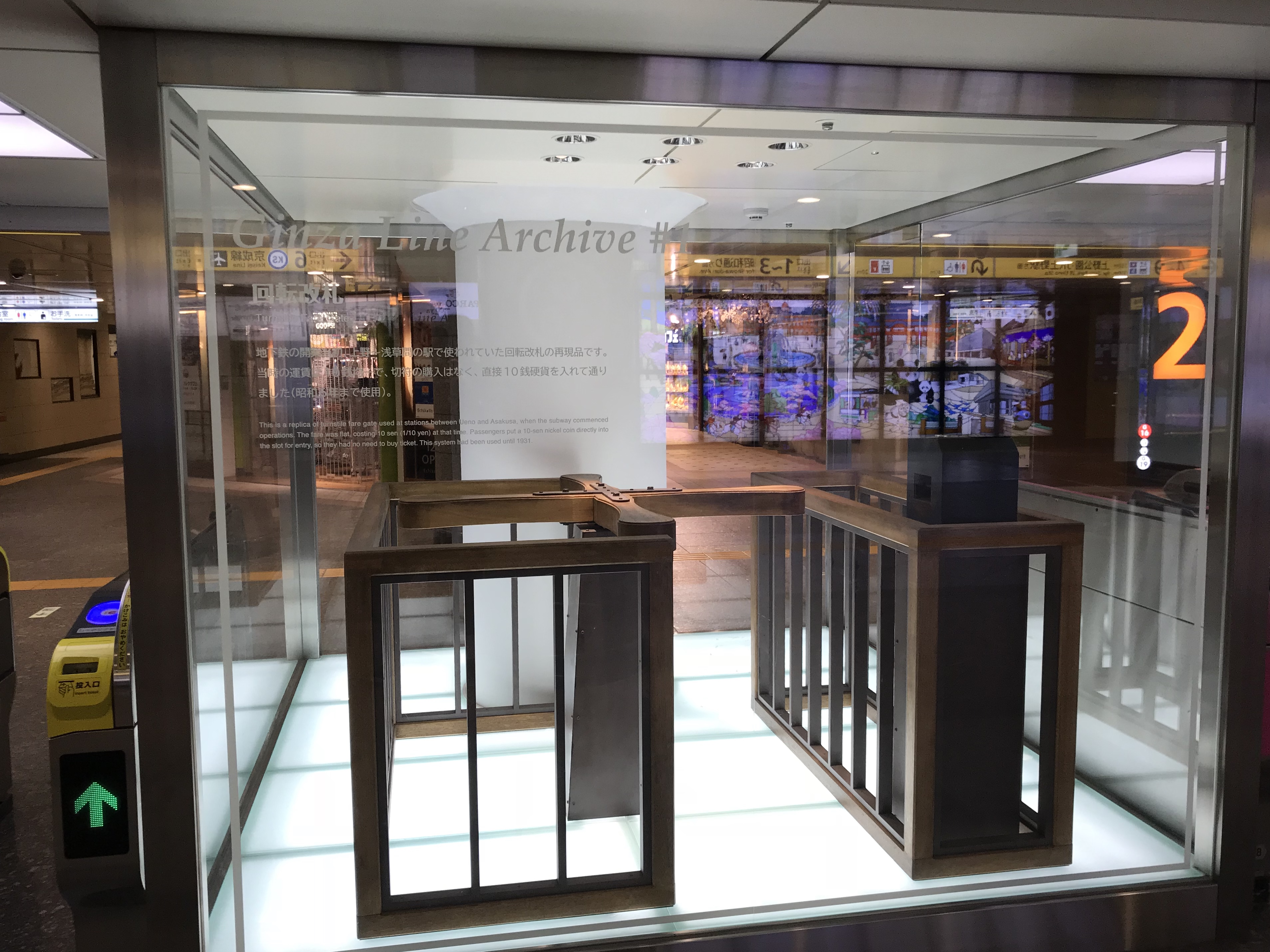
Automatic ticket gates at the ticket gates for JR Ueno Station at Ueno Station on the Tokyo Metro Ginza Line (restored)

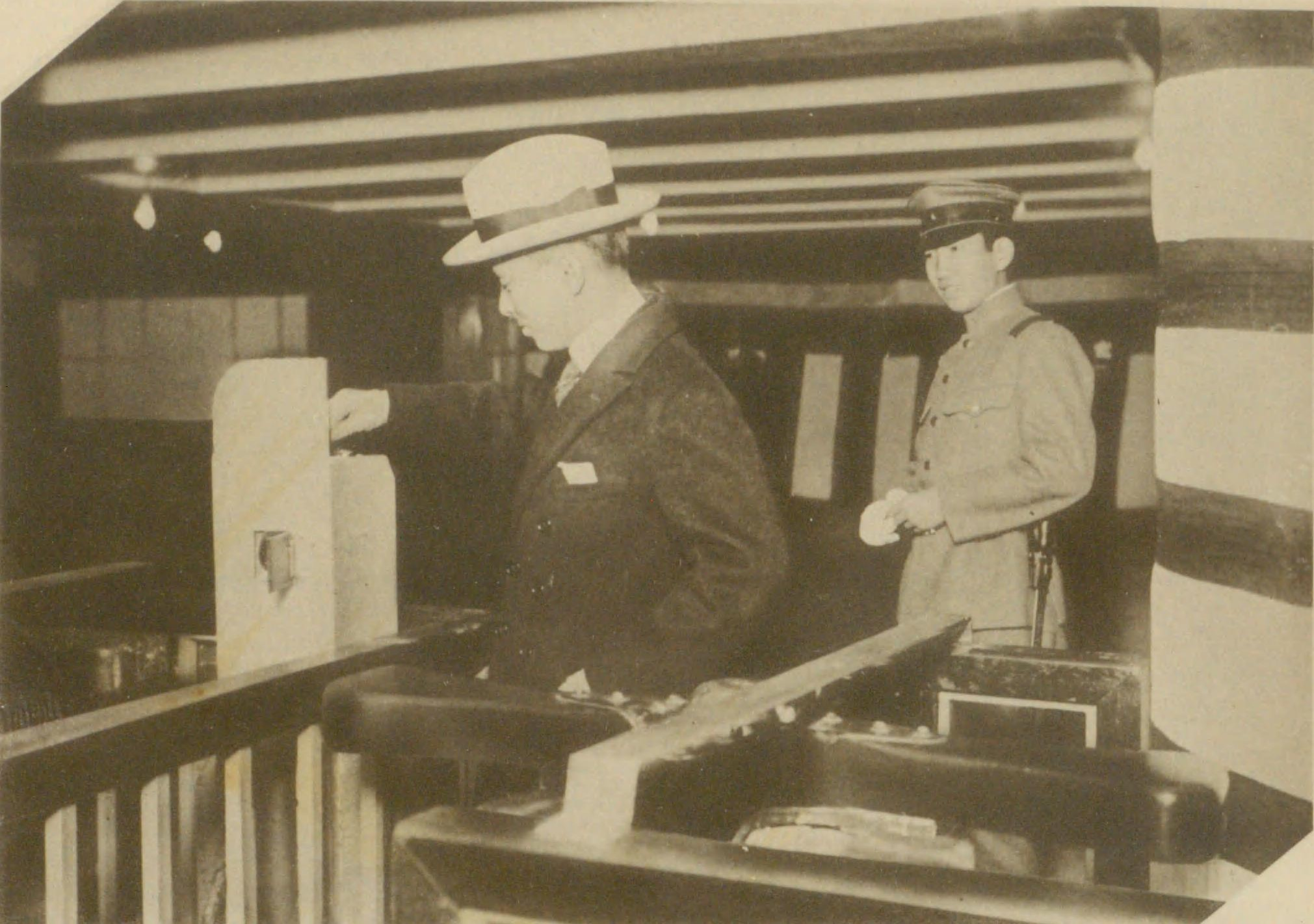
Prince Asaka and Prince Takeda passing through the station ticket gates before the opening ceremony of the Tokyo Underground Railway on December 29, 1927.

A hybrid operational system involving the Tokyo Underground Railway, the Keihin Subway, the Keihin Electric Railway, and the Shonan Electric Railway was promoted, under which overhead lines were used for current collection via pantographs on the Keihin and Shonan lines, while third rails with collector shoes were employed on subway lines. During this period, the Keihin Electric Railway became the largest shareholder of the Tokyo Underground Railway.

In 1939, the Tokyo Rapid Transit opened Line 3 between Shibuya and Shimbashi on January 15, establishing Shimbashi as a transfer point with the Tokyo Underground Railway. Later that year, on August 1, Keita Goto of the Tokyo Yokohama Electric Railway acquired shares of the Keihin Electric Railway and subsequently purchased shares in the Tokyo Underground Railway in a hostile takeover attempt. This triggered a struggle for control of the Tokyo Underground Railway between the Hayakawa and Goto factions. On September 16, 1939, through services between the Tokyo Underground Railway and the Tokyo Rapid Transit commenced via Shimbashi Station, effectively forming what is now the Tokyo Metro Ginza Line. The corporate dispute was resolved on August 13, 1940, through mediation by the Ministry of Railways.

As a result, Hayakawa stepped down from active management and assumed an advisory role, while managerial control of the Tokyo Underground Railway was transferred to the Tokyo Rapid Railway. However, Keita Goto was not permitted to assume an executive position within the Tokyo Underground Railway. On September 1, 1941, under wartime regulations enacted pursuant to the Land Transportation Business Adjustment Law, the subway lines and licenses of the Tokyo Underground Railway were merged with those of the Tokyo Rapid Transit Authority, the Keihin Subway (licenses only), and the Tokyo Municipal Subway (licenses only) to form the semi-public Teito Rapid Transit Authority (Teidan Subway). Goto invested in the new entity through Tokyu Corporation and became a director. Following World War II, private capital was excluded from the Teito Rapid Transit Authority, which was reorganized as a special public corporation jointly funded by the Japanese government, through Japanese National Railways, and the Tokyo Metropolitan Government.

== Trams ==
=== Joto tram line ===
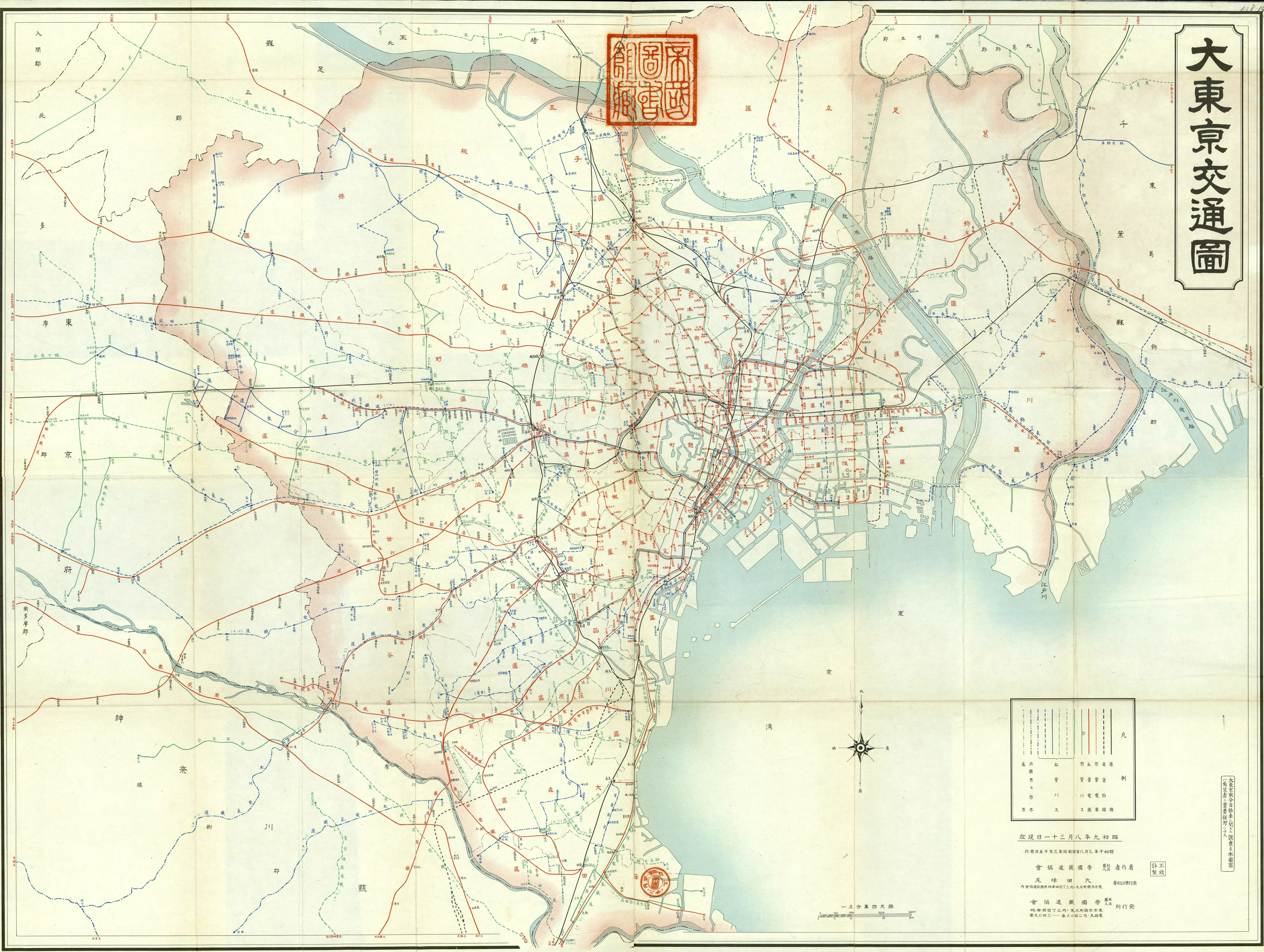
Greater Tokyo Transportation Map (1935) showing the Jyoto Electric Tramway system map.
- December 30, 1917 ー The Kinshicho -Komatsugawa section opens under the management of the Joto Electric Railway Co., Ltd (城東電気軌道株式会社).
- January 1, 1921 ー The line between Suikamimori and Oshima opens.
- July 11, 1924 ー The Oshima - Senke Inari section opens.
- December 31, 1925 ー The Higashi-Arakawa - Imai section opens.
- March 1, 1926 ー The Komatsugawa-Nishiarakawa section opens.
- May 7, 1929 ー The line opened between Senke-Inari and Susaki (complete line except for the Nishi-Arakawa and Higashi-Arakawa sections).
- March 25, 1937 ー Merged with Tokyo Bus Company (東京乗合自動車). Became the company's Joto Tramway Line (城東軌道線).
- April 25, 1938 ー Tokyo Underground Railway takes over the Joto Tramway Line.
- February 1, 1942 ー Acquired by the Tokyo Municipal Electric Bureau and incorporated into the city tram line.

== Buses ==
=== Blue Bus ===
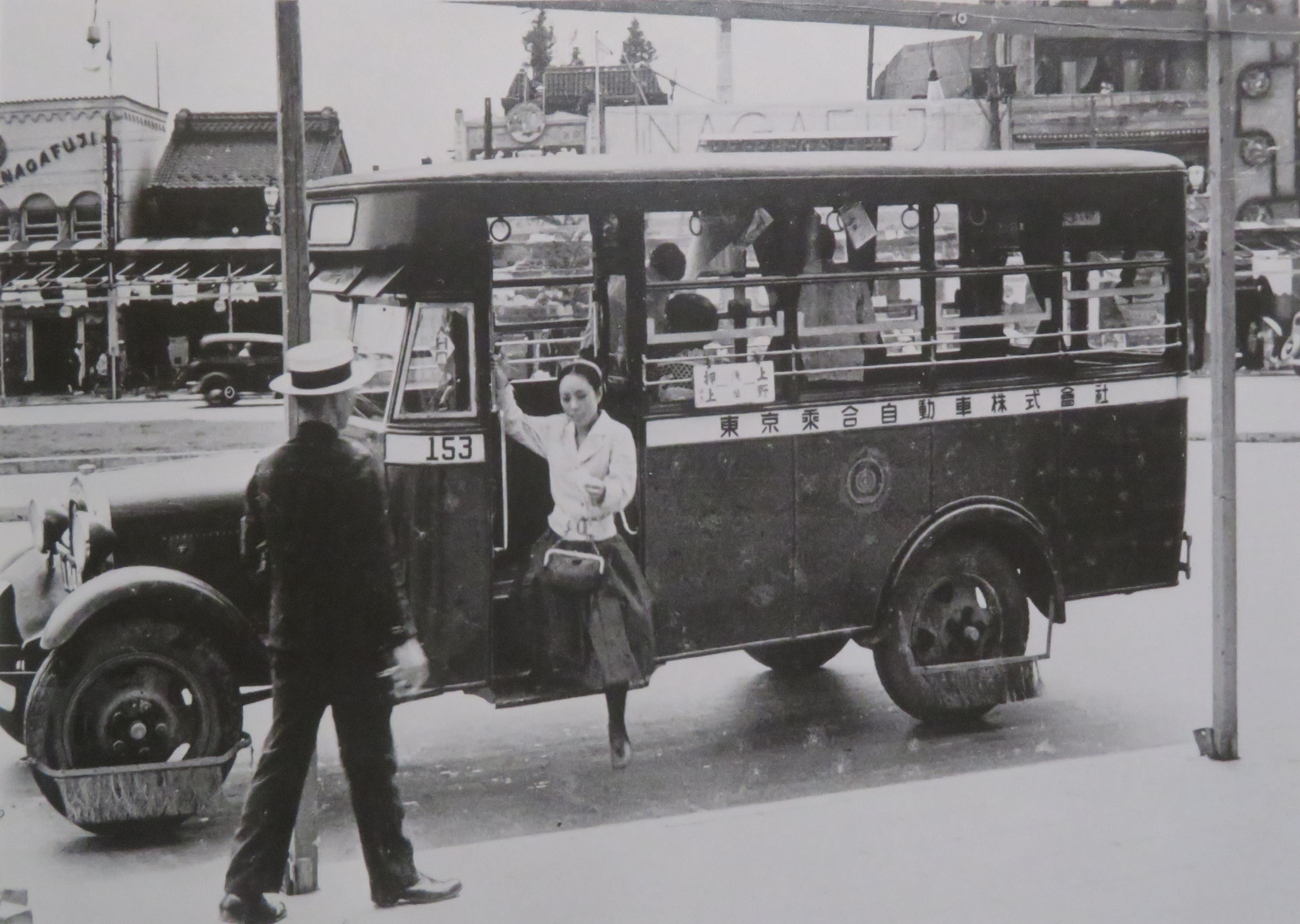
Tokyo Bus Company bus and a female conductor, 1934

November 1, 1918 ー Ryohei Horiuchi, the founder of Fujikyuko establishes Tokyo Urban Motor Vehicle Co., Ltd (東京市街自動車株式会社).

- March 1, 1919 ー Bus service begins between Shimbashi and Ueno. Known as the "Blue Bus" due to the deep green color of the buses.
- June 27, 1922 ー Company name changed to Tokyo Bus Company (東京乗合自動車).
- October 1930 ー Japan's first female train conductors were hired. They were called "white collar girls" because of the shape of their uniforms.
- March 25, 1937 ー Merged with Joto Electric Tramway and inherited the company's bus division.
- April 25, 1938 ー Tokyo Underground Railway merges with Tokyo Bus Company and takes over the "Blue Bus" service.
- February 1, 1942 ー As part of wartime integration under the Land Transportation Business Adjustment Act, the "Ao Bus" business was acquired by the Tokyo Municipal Electric Bureau and incorporated into the city bus system (Toei Bus).

== See also ==
- Tokyo Rapid Railway
- Tokyo Metro
  - Teito Rapid Transit Authority
  - Tokyo Metro Ginza Line
- Keikyu Railway
