= Tokyo Metro rolling stock =

Passenger trains that run in the Tokyo Metro

The Tokyo Metro owns or uses the following types of rolling stock.

== Ginza Line ==
Trains on the Ginza Line run in three-door six-car formations with no through trains into other suburban rail lines in Greater Tokyo. The maximum operating speed is 65 km/h (40 mph).

=== Present ===
- Tokyo Metro 1000 series (since 11 April 2012)
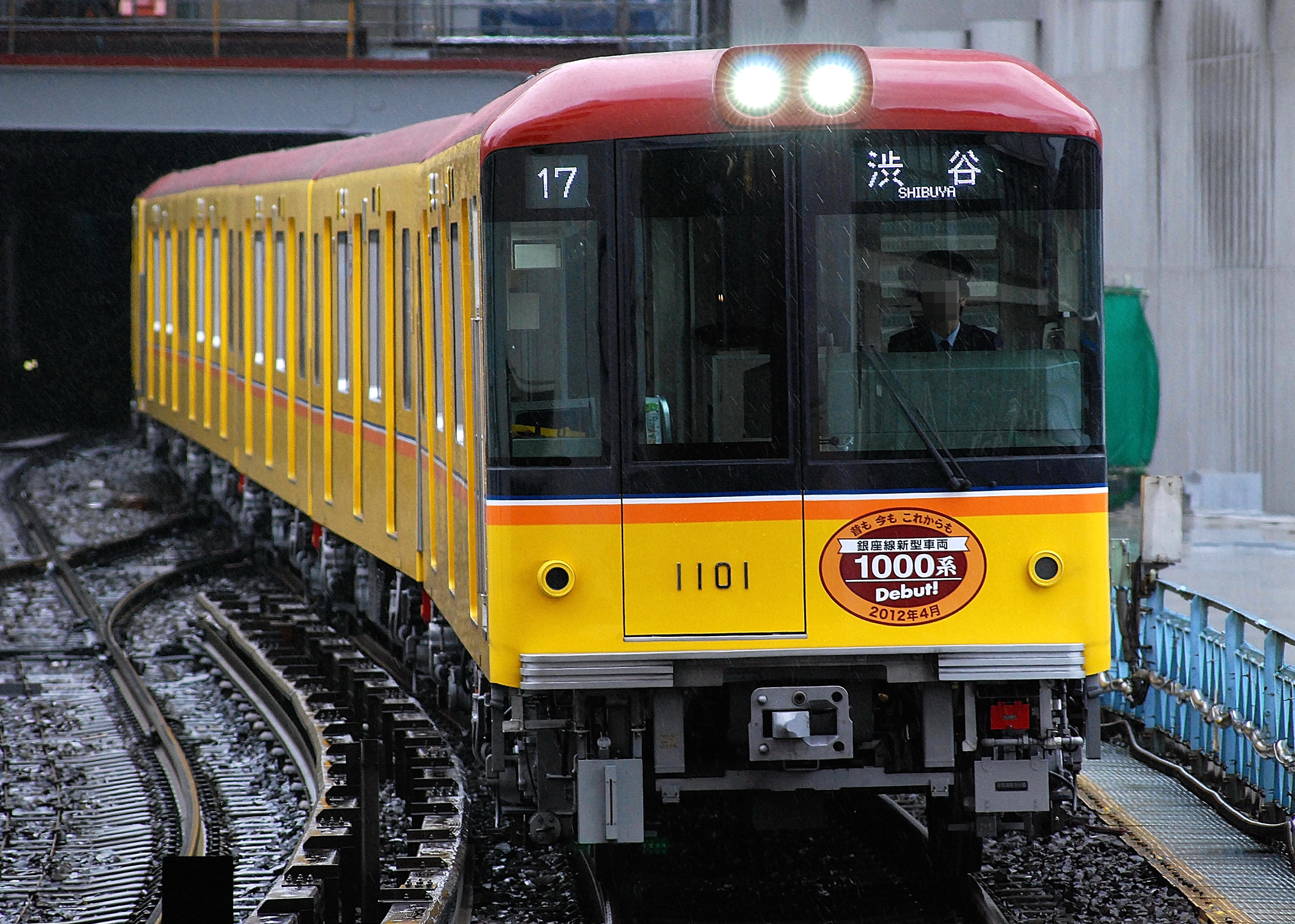
Tokyo Metro 1000 series

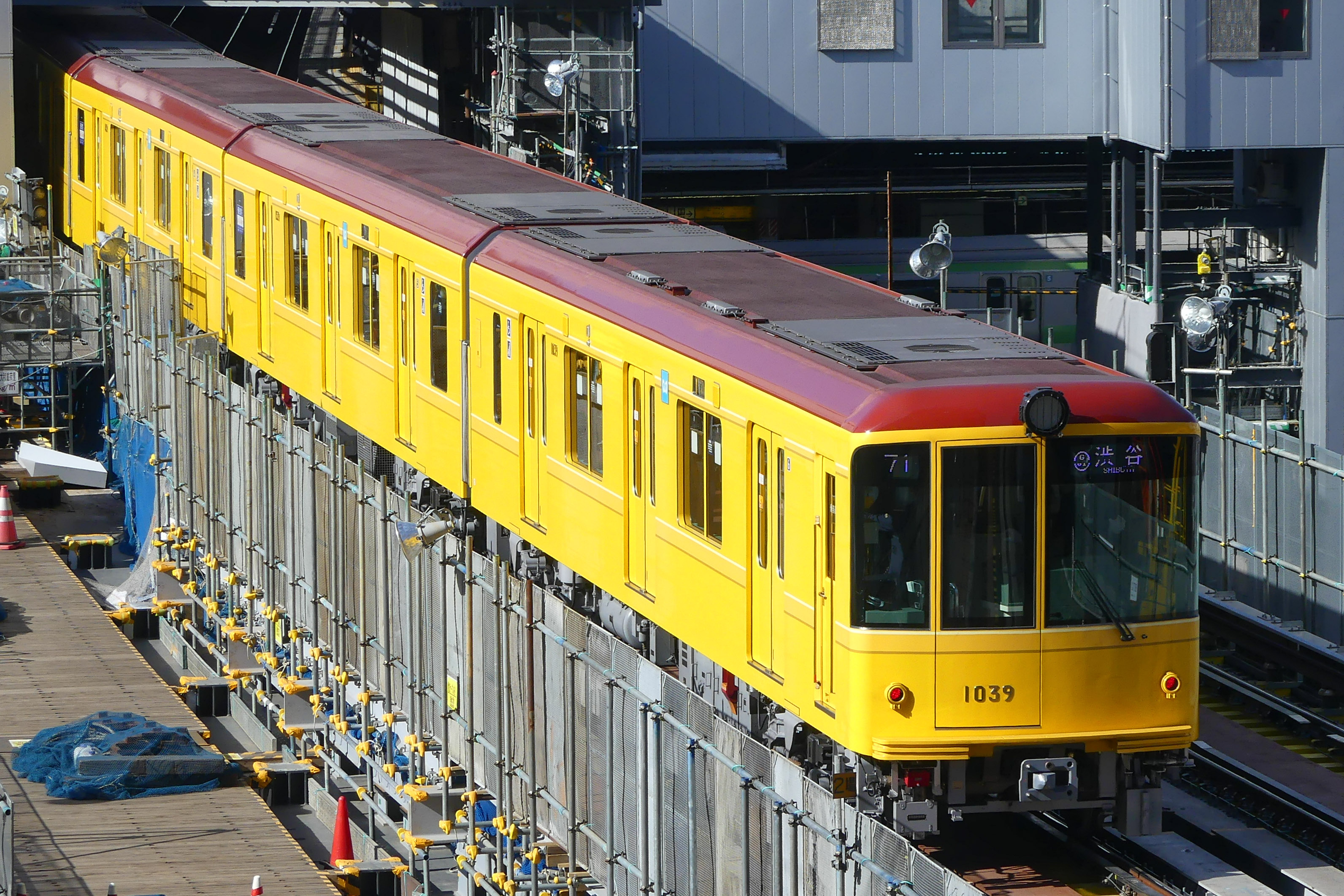
Tokyo Metro 1000 series (retro design)

=== Former ===
- Tokyo Rapid Railway 100 series (from 1938 until 1968)
- Tokyo Underground Railway 1000 series (from 1927 until 1968)
- Tokyo Underground Railway 1100 series (from 1930 until 1968)
- Tokyo Underground Railway 1200 series (from 1934 until 1986)
- TRTA 1300 series (from 1949 until 1986)
- TRTA 1400 series (from 1953 until 1985)
- TRTA 1500 series (from 1954 until 1986)
- TRTA 1500N series (from 1968 until 1993)
- TRTA 1600 series (from 1955 until 1986)
- TRTA 1700 series (from 1956 until 1986)
- TRTA 1800 series (from 1958 until 1986)
- TRTA 1900 series (from 1958 until 1987)
- TRTA 2000 series (from 1958 until 1993)
- Tokyo Metro 01 series (from 1983 until 2017)
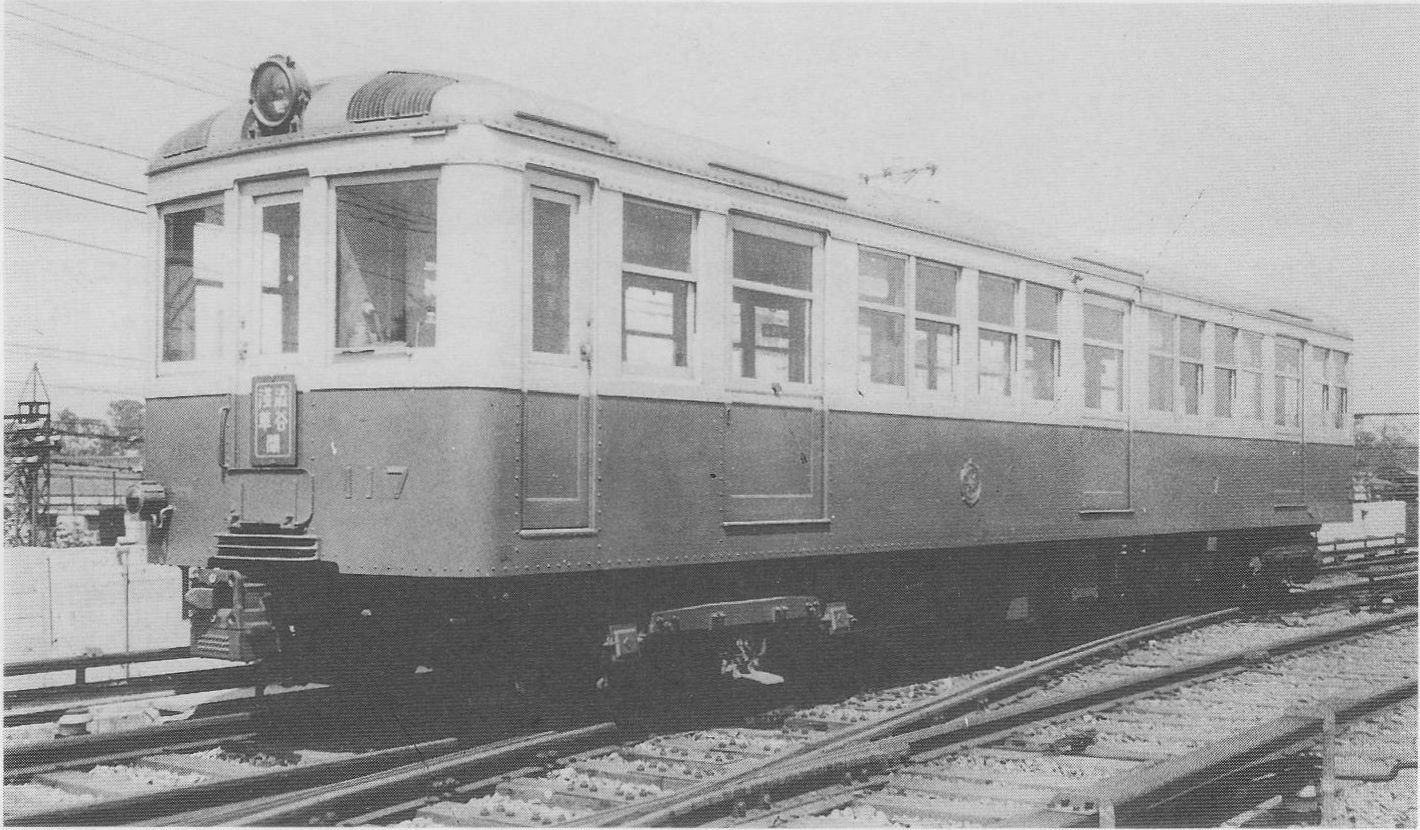
Tokyo Rapid Railway 100 series

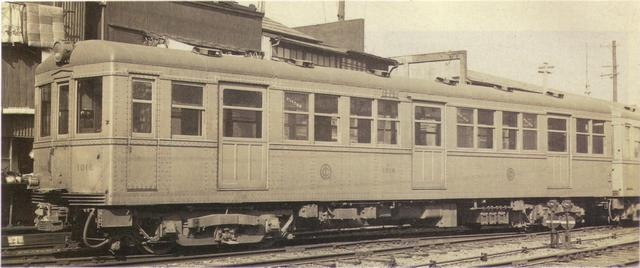
Tokyo Underground Railway 1000 series

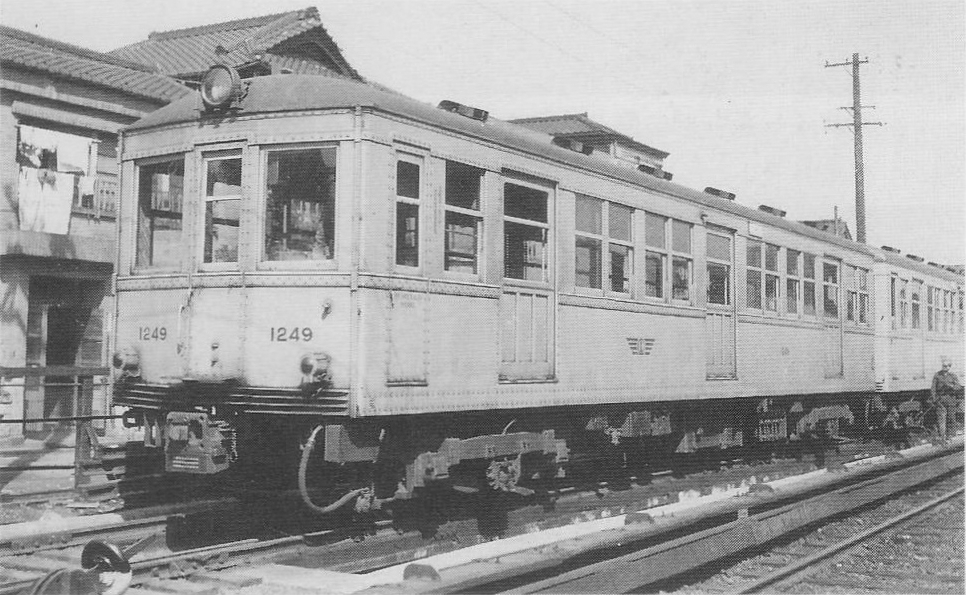
TRTA 1200 series

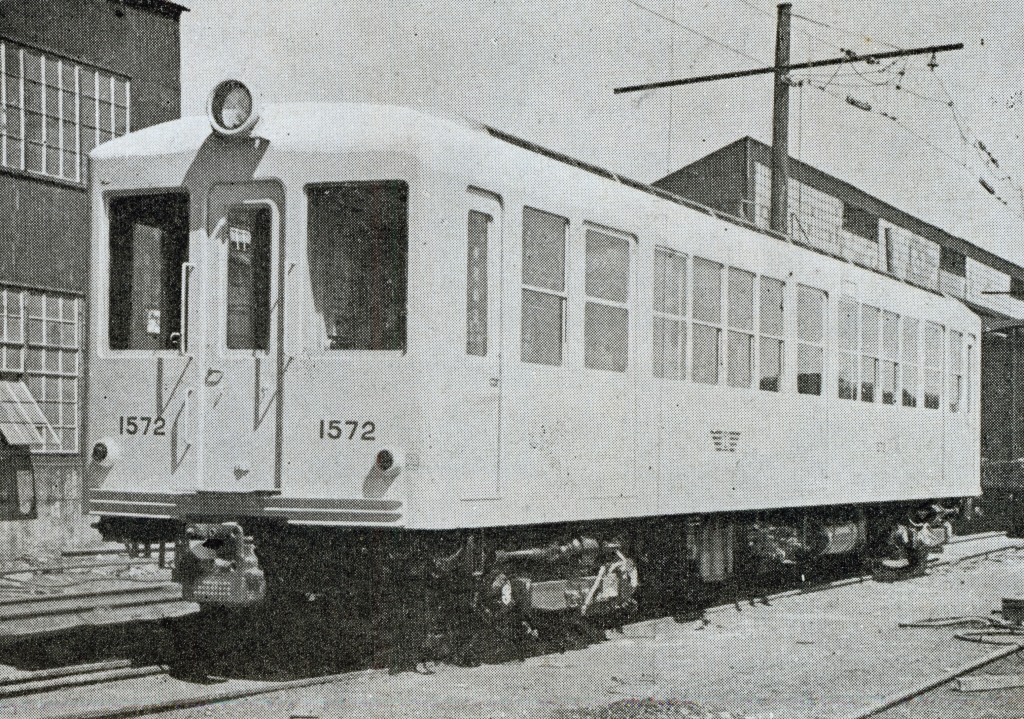
TRTA 1500 series

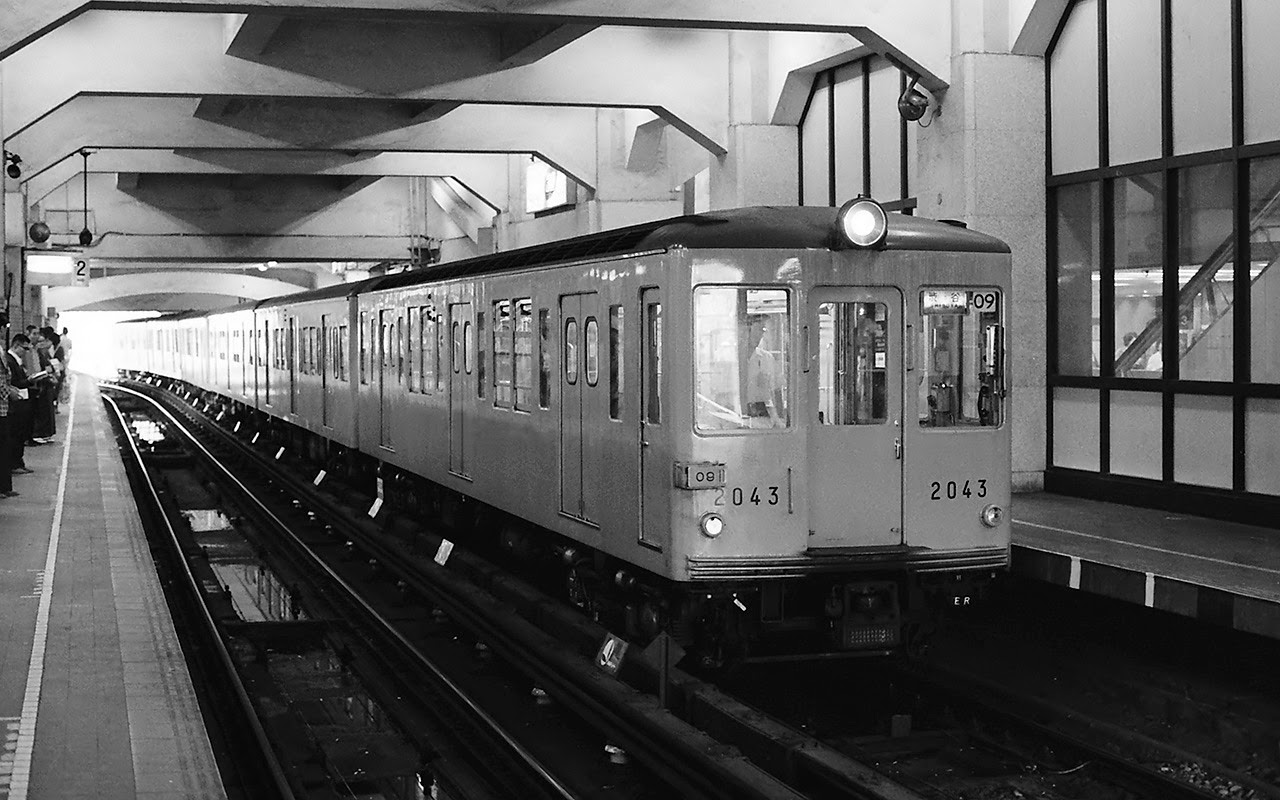
TRTA 2000 series

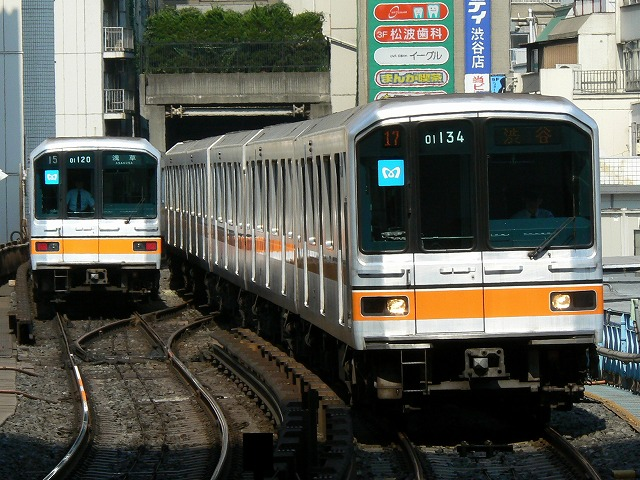
Tokyo Metro 01 series

== Marunouchi Line ==
Trains on the Marunouchi Line run in three-door six-car formations with no through trains into other suburban rail lines in Greater Tokyo. The maximum operating speed is 75 km/h (47 mph).

=== Present ===
- Tokyo Metro 2000 series (since 2019)
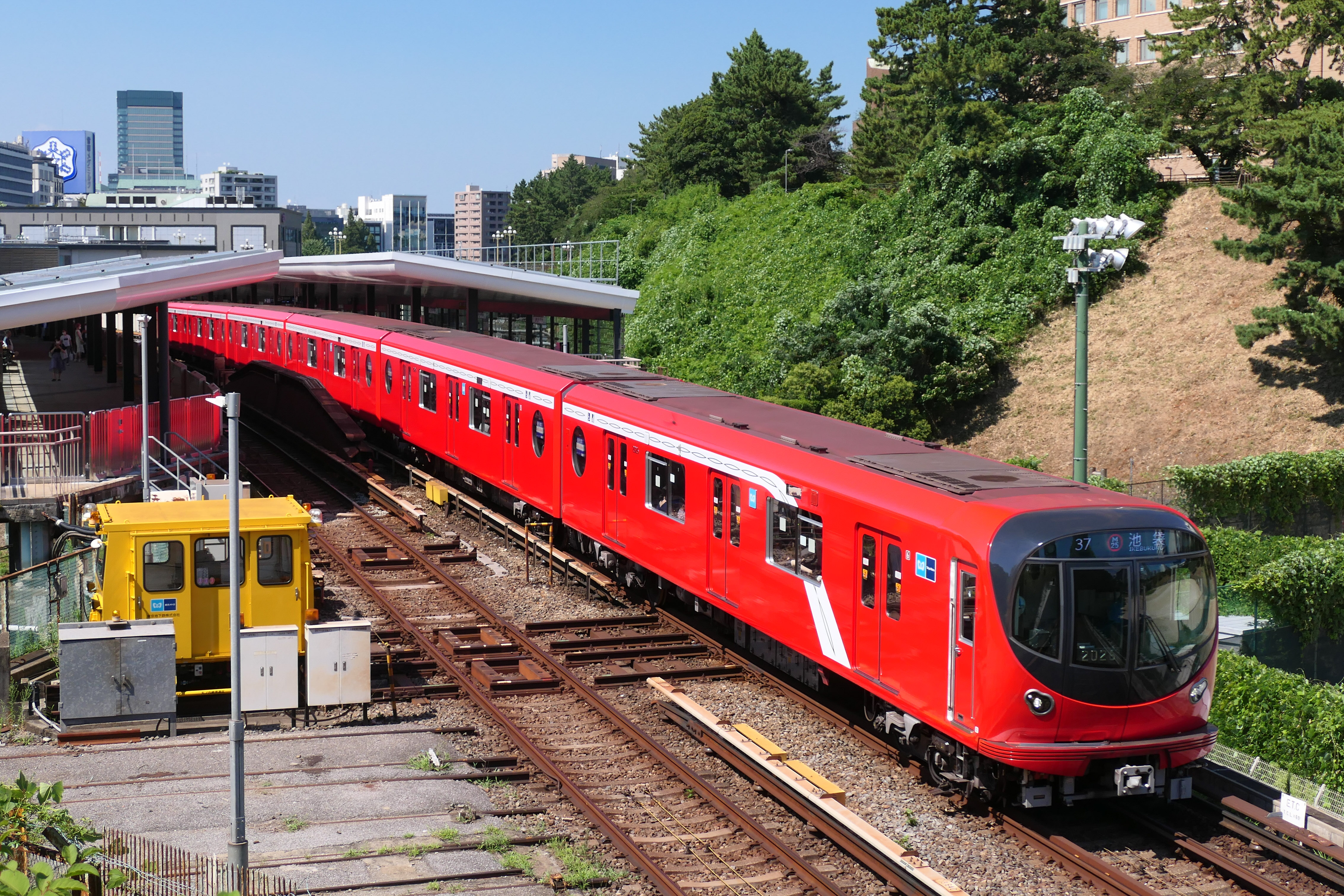
Tokyo Metro 2000 series

=== Former ===
- TRTA 300/400/500/900 series (from 1954 until 1996, later sold and exported for use on Line B of the Buenos Aires Metro)
- Tokyo Rapid Railway 100 series (from 1962 until 1968, transferred from Ginza Line, used for Hōnanchō branch only)
- TRTA 2000 series (from 1968 until 1981, used for Hōnanchō branch only)
- Tokyo Metro 02 series (From 1988 until 2024)
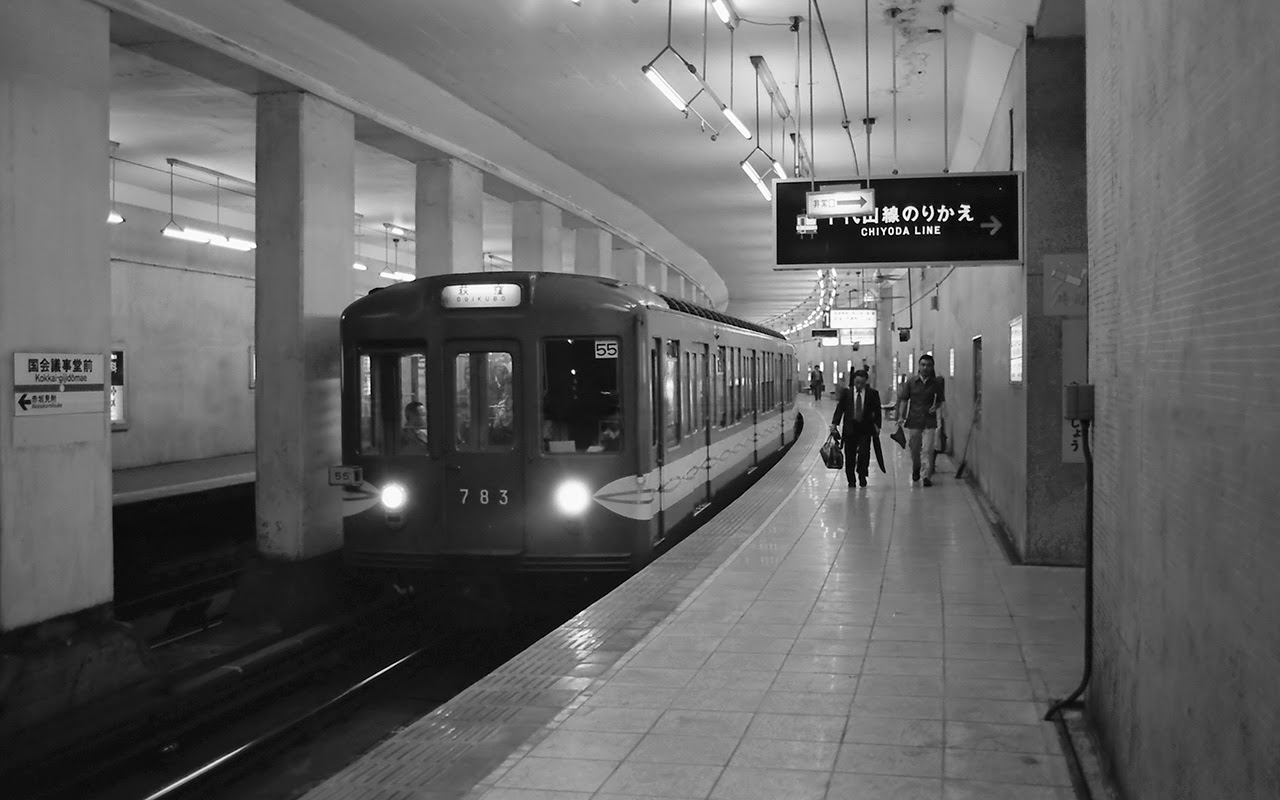
TRTA 500 series

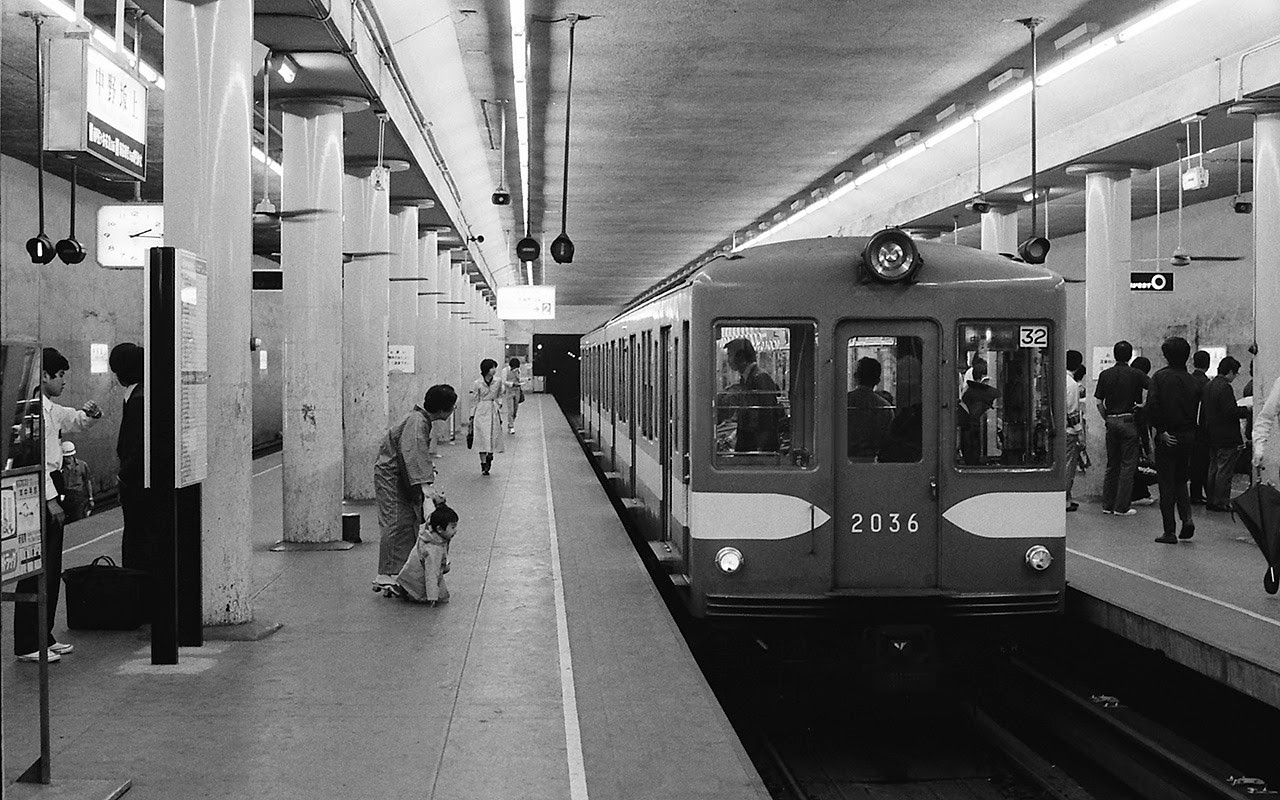
TRTA 2000 series

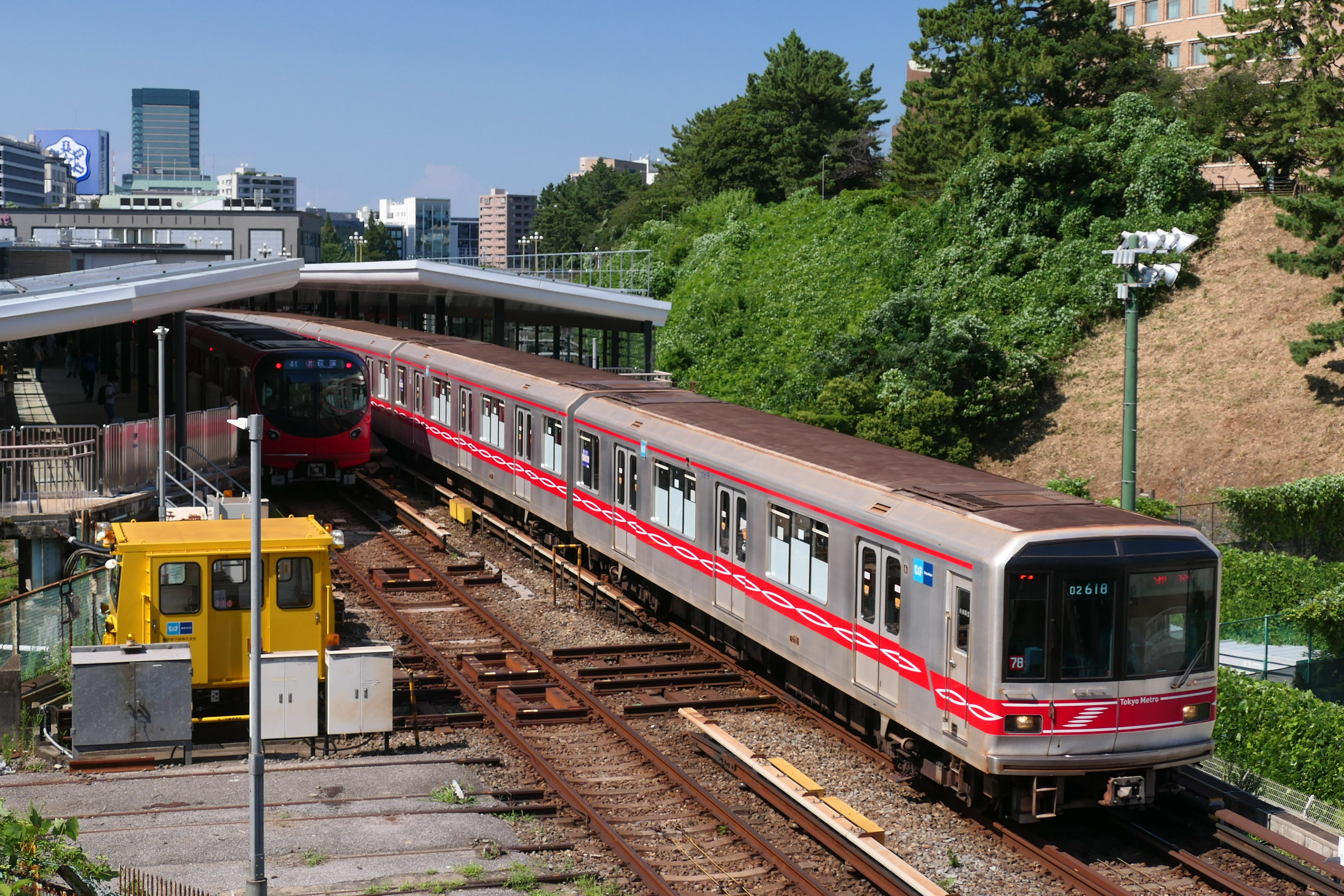
Tokyo Metro 02 series

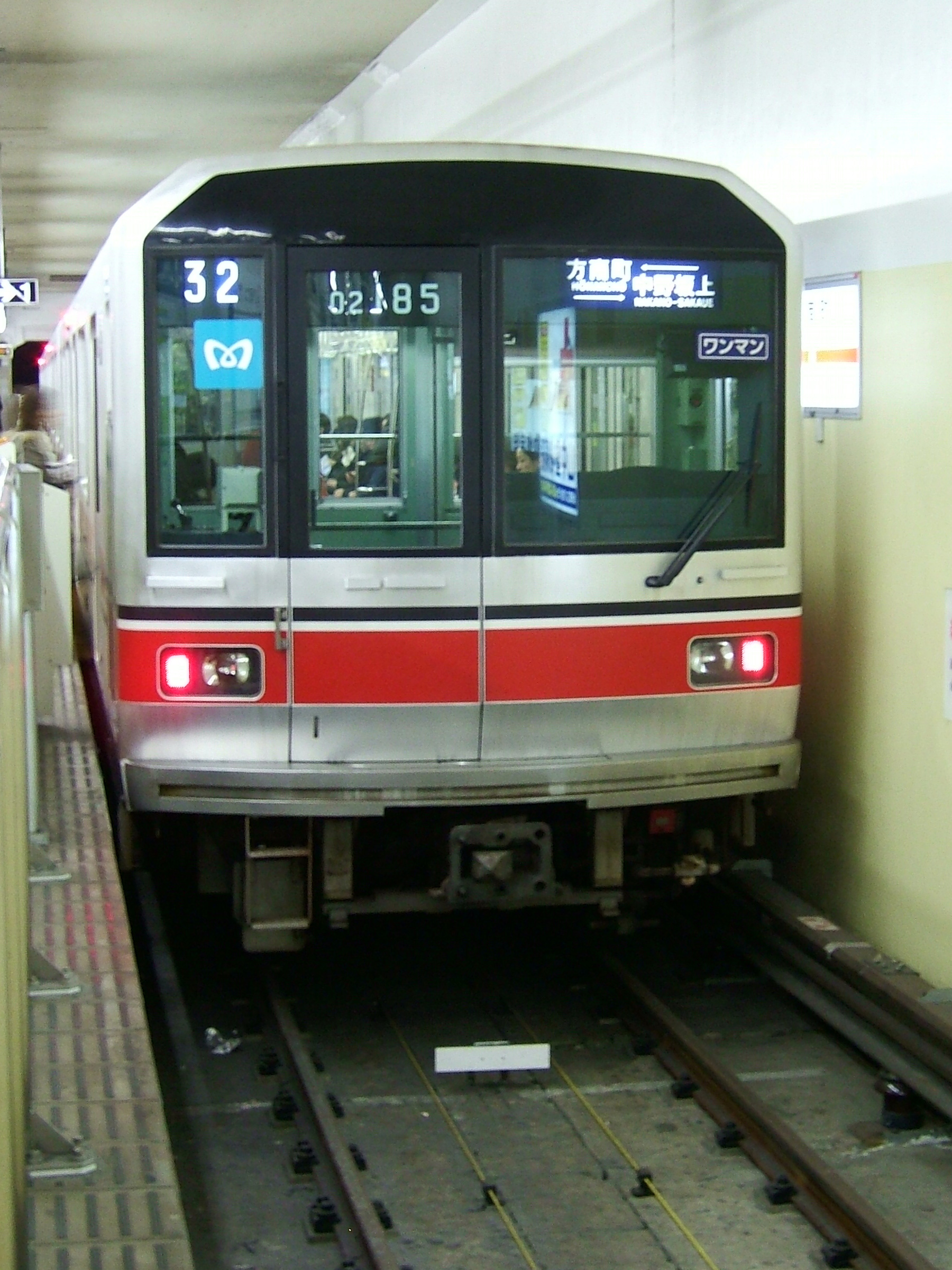
Tokyo Metro 02 series (Hōnanchō branch)

== Hibiya Line ==
Hibiya Line trains are 20-meter-long 7-car formations, with four doors per side. Prior to March 2017, Hibiya Line trains were 18 m long 8-car formations, with a mixture of three or five doors per side. Tokyu Corporation formerly operated trains from the Tokyu Toyoko Line into the Hibiya Line from 1964 until 2013, when through-services between the Toyoko Line and the Tokyo Metro Fukutoshin Line commenced operations.

=== Present ===
Tokyo Metro

- Tokyo Metro 13000 series (since 25 March 2017)

Tobu Railway

- Tobu 70000 series (since 7 July 2017)
- Tobu 70090 series (since March 2020)
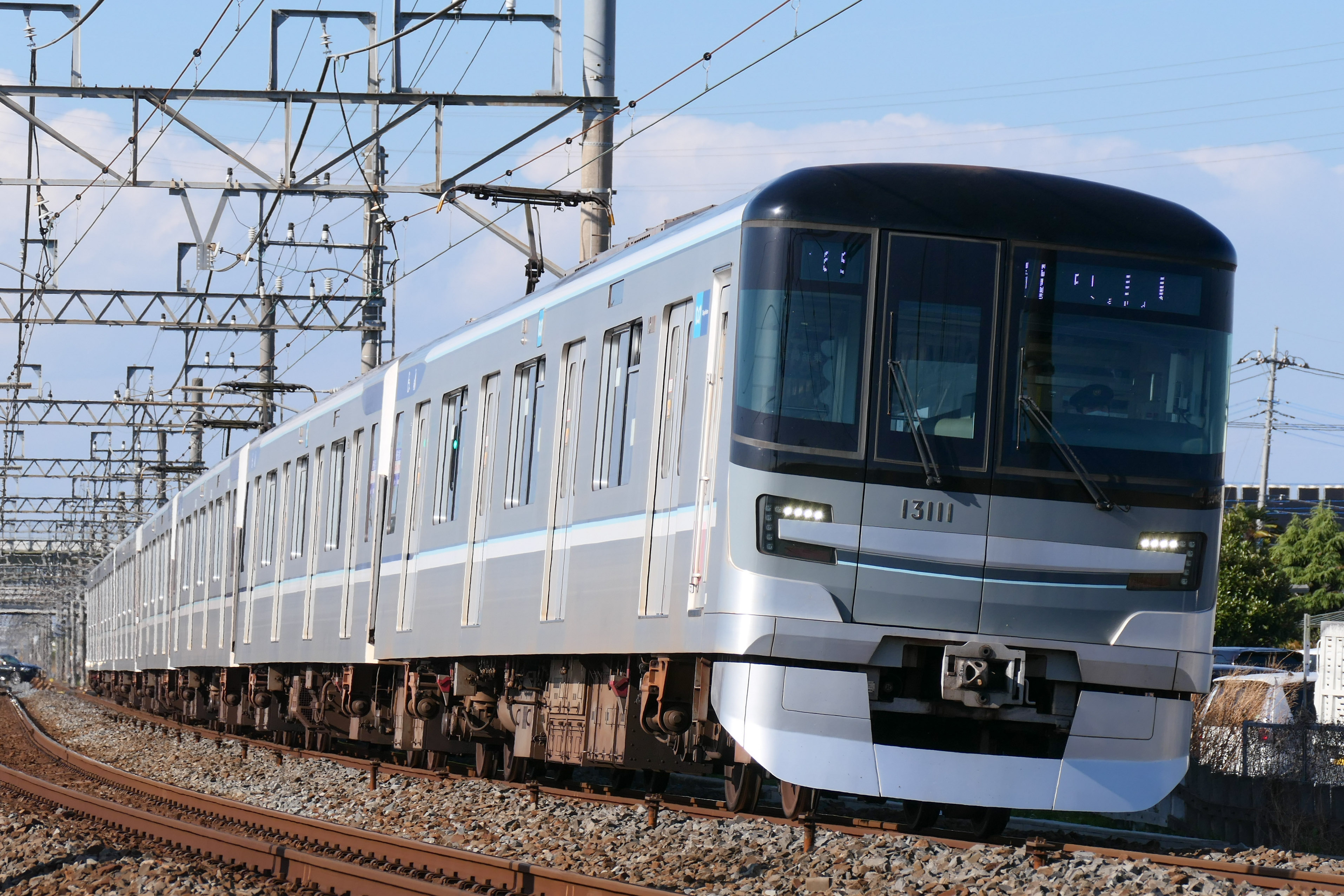
Tokyo Metro 13000 series

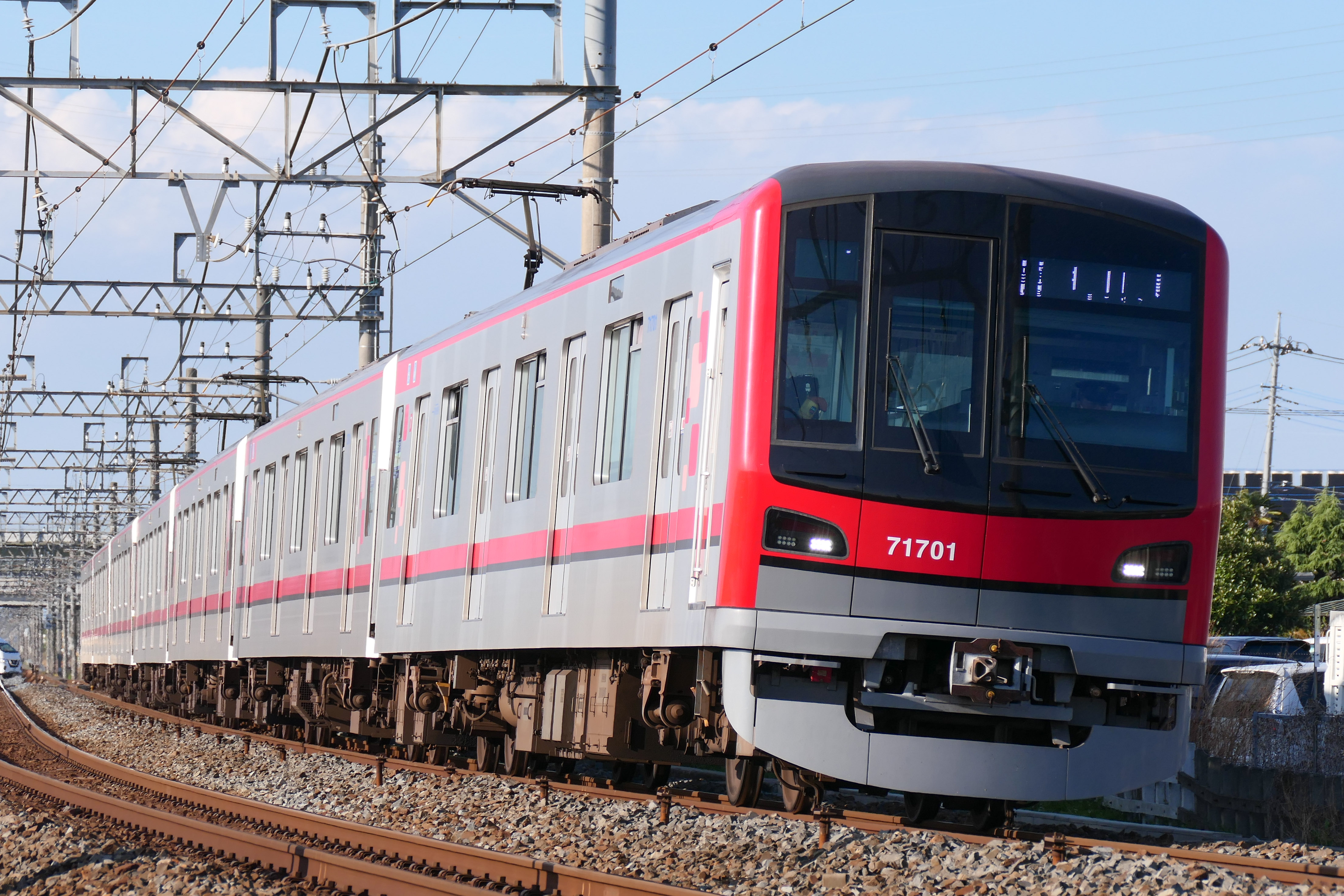
Tobu 70000 series

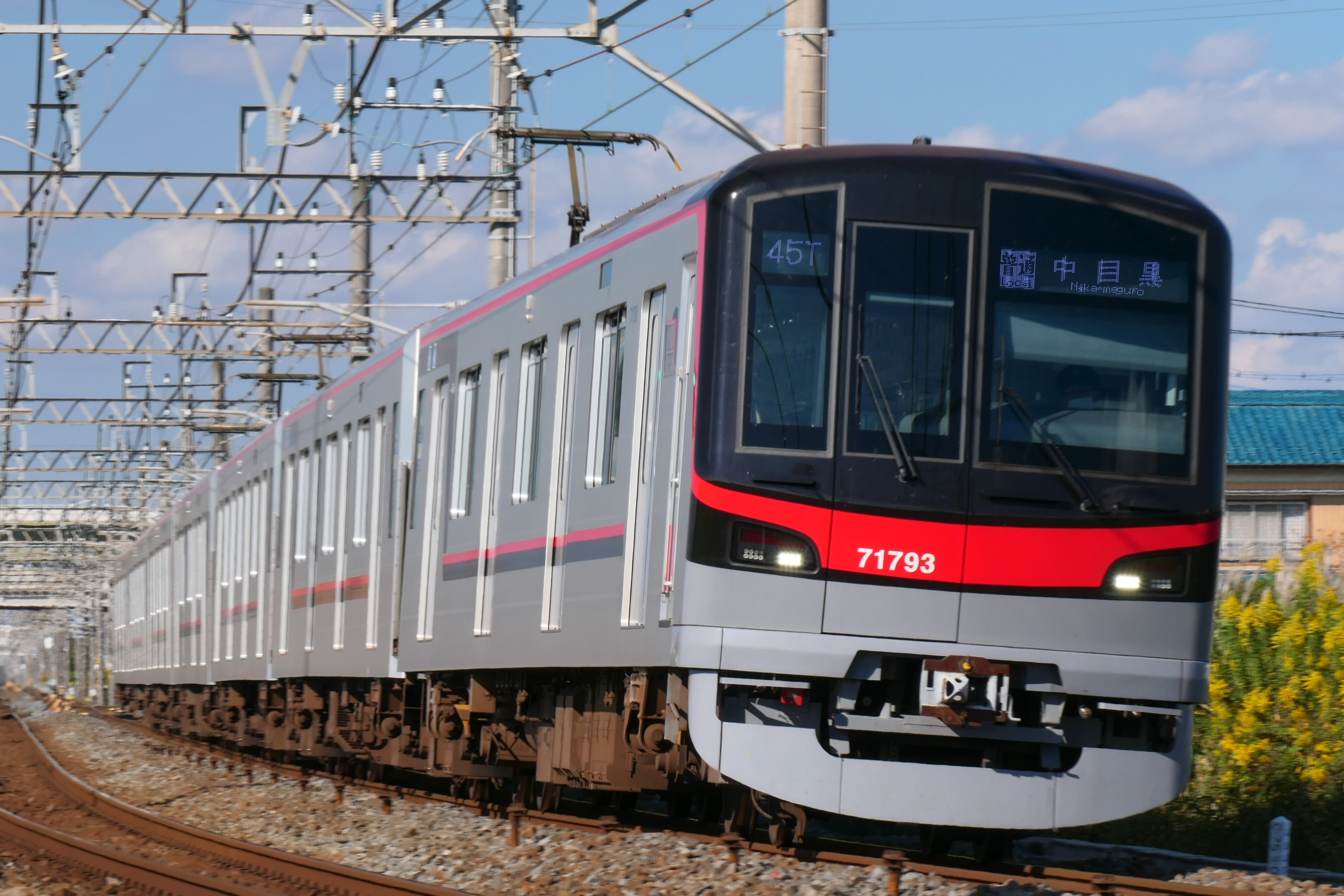
Tobu 70090 series

=== Former ===
TRTA/Tokyo Metro

- TRTA 3000 series (from 1961 until July 1994)
- Tokyo Metro 03 series (from 1988 until 28 February 2020)

Tobu Railway

- Tobu 2000 series (from 1962 until 1993)
- Tobu 20000 series (from 1988 until 27 March 2020)

Tokyu Corporation

- Tokyu 7000 series (original) (from 1964 until 1991)
- Tokyu 1000 series (from 1991 until 2013)
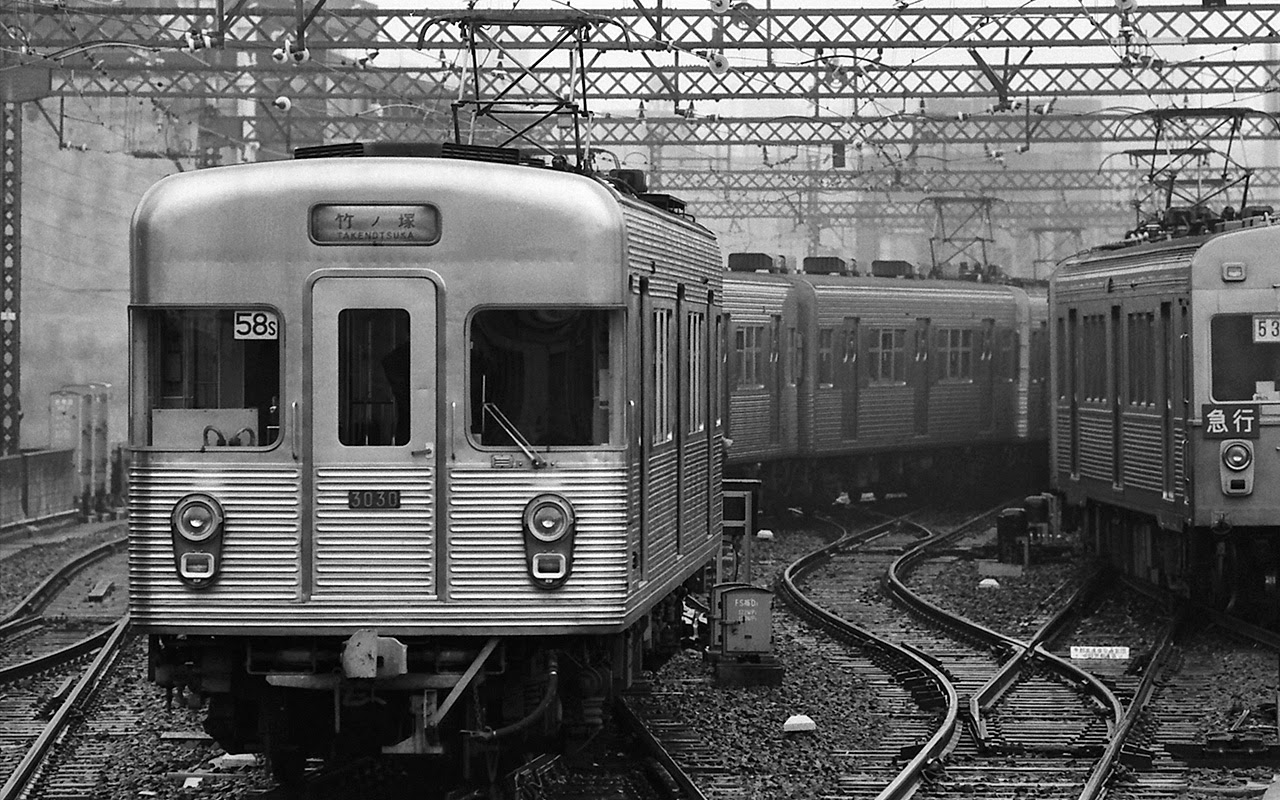
TRTA 3000 series

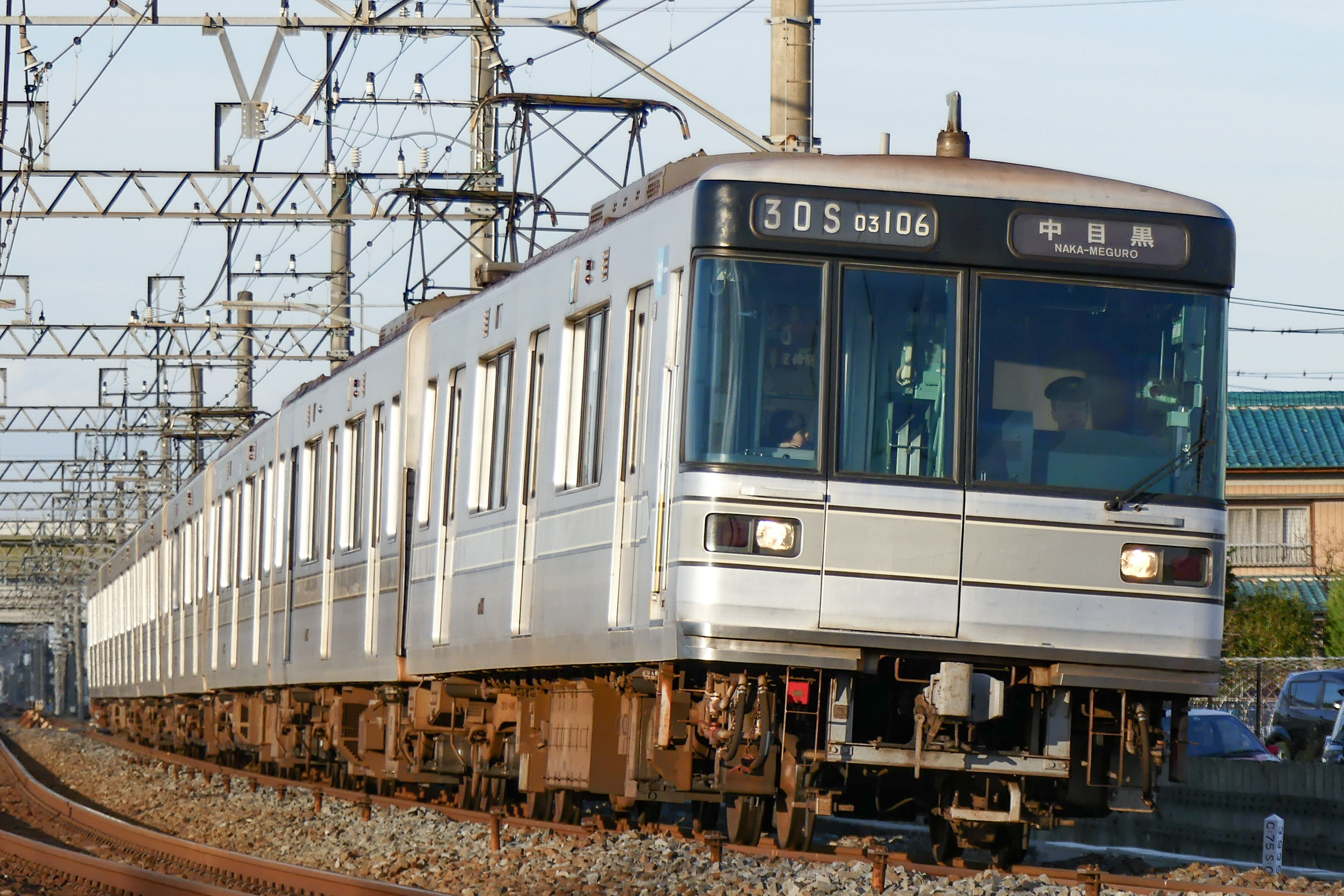
Tokyo Metro 03 series

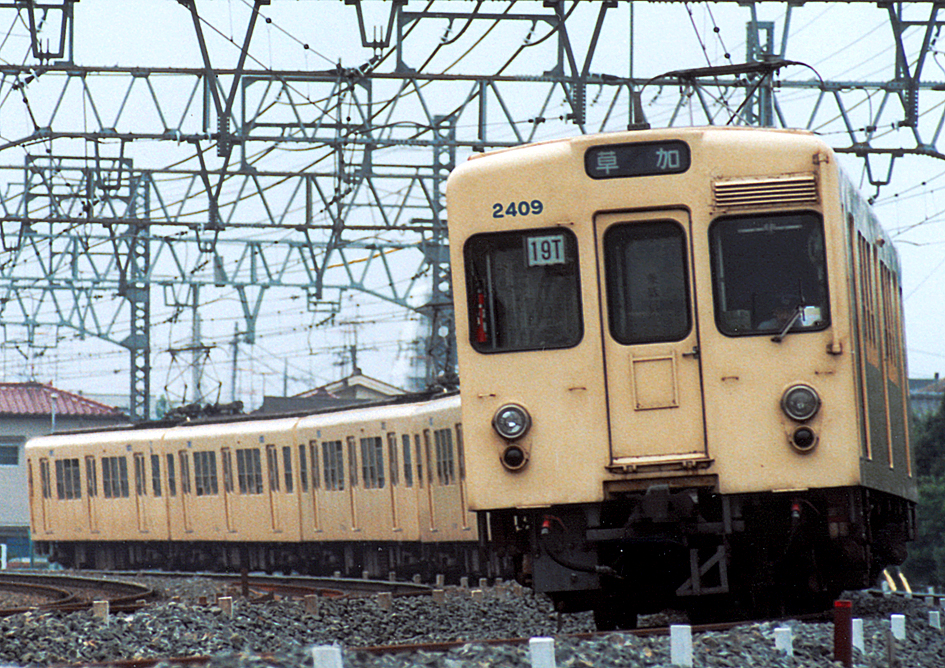
Tobu 2000 series

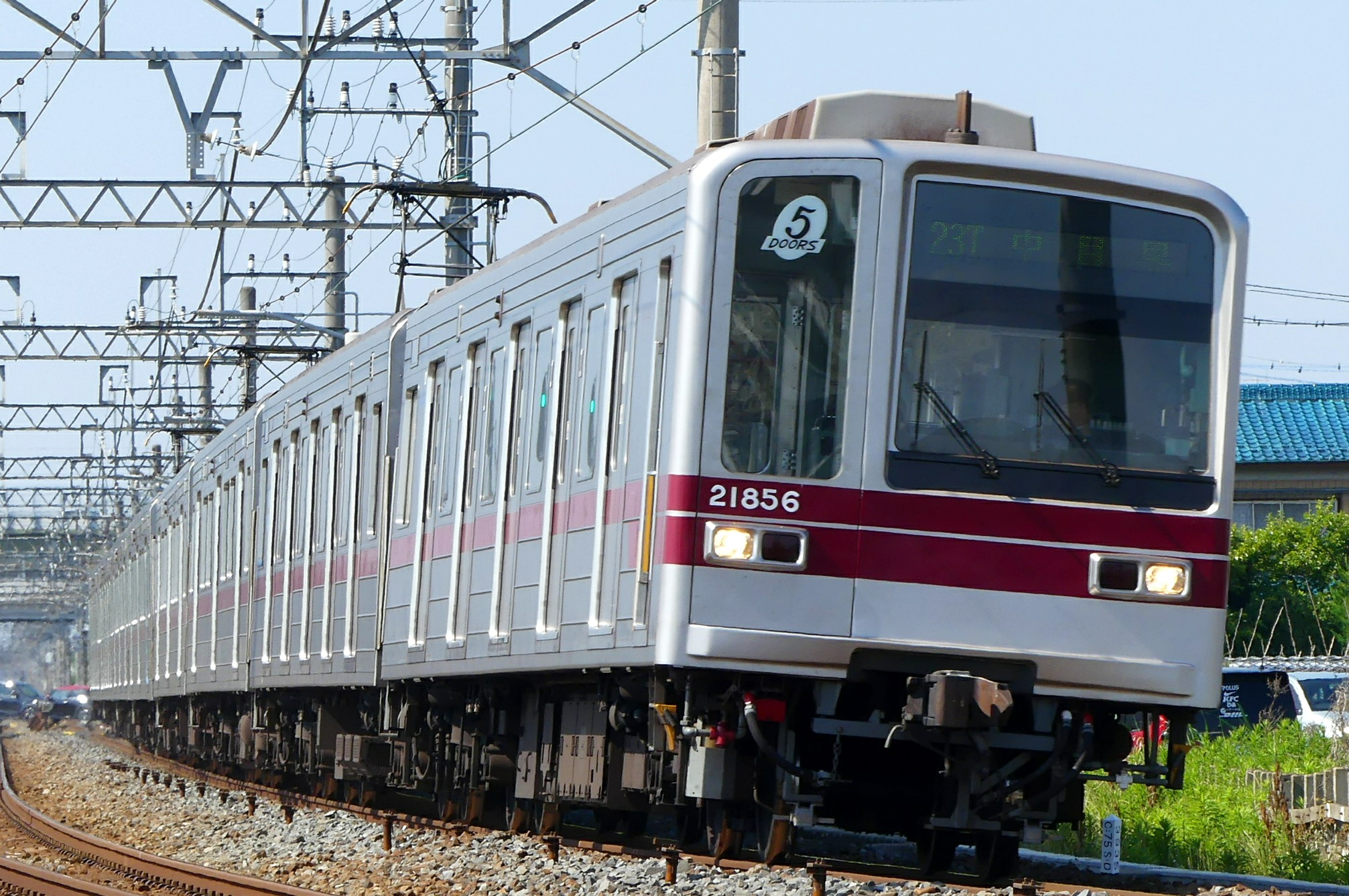
Tobu 20000 series

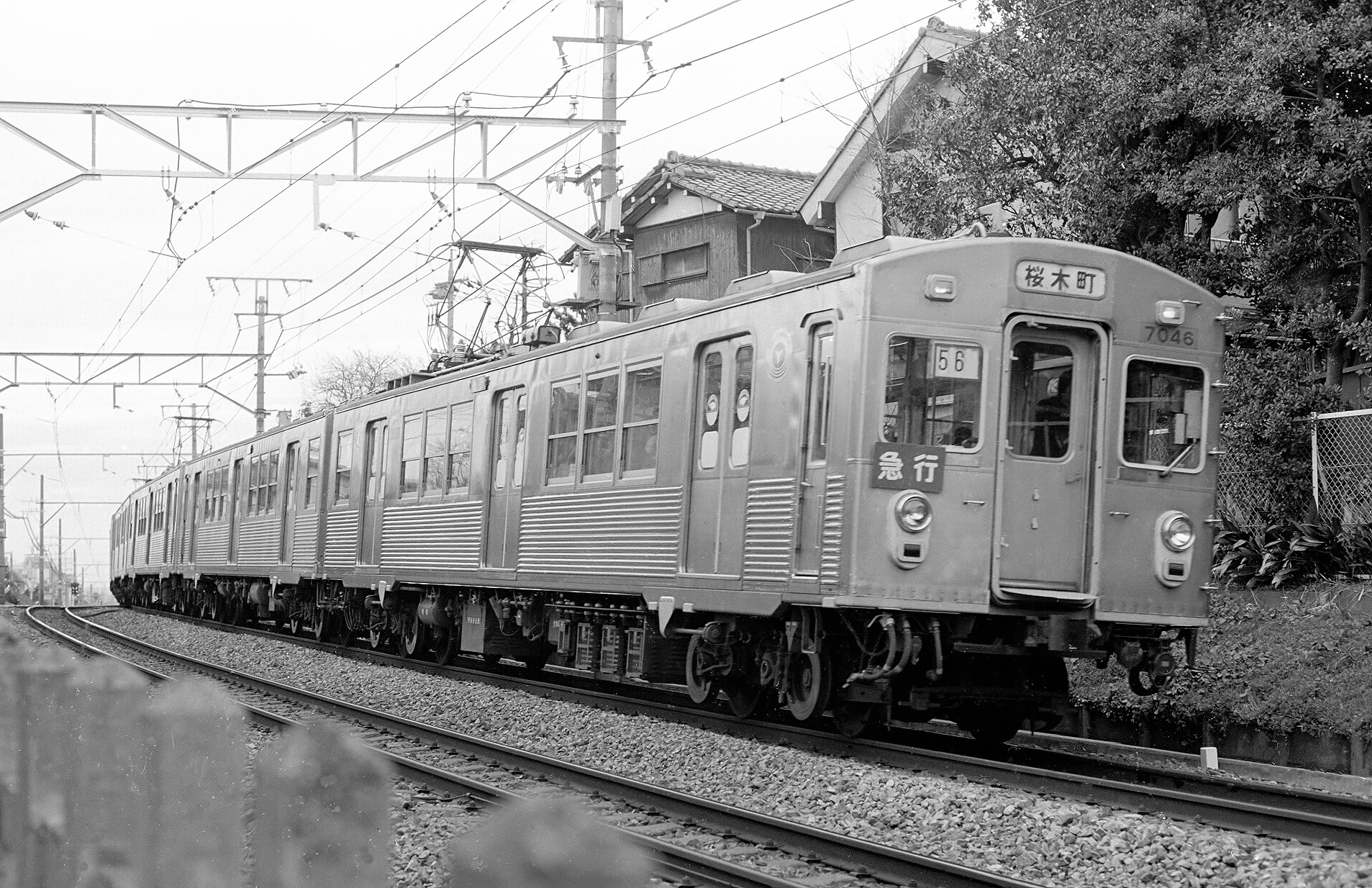
Tokyu 7000 series

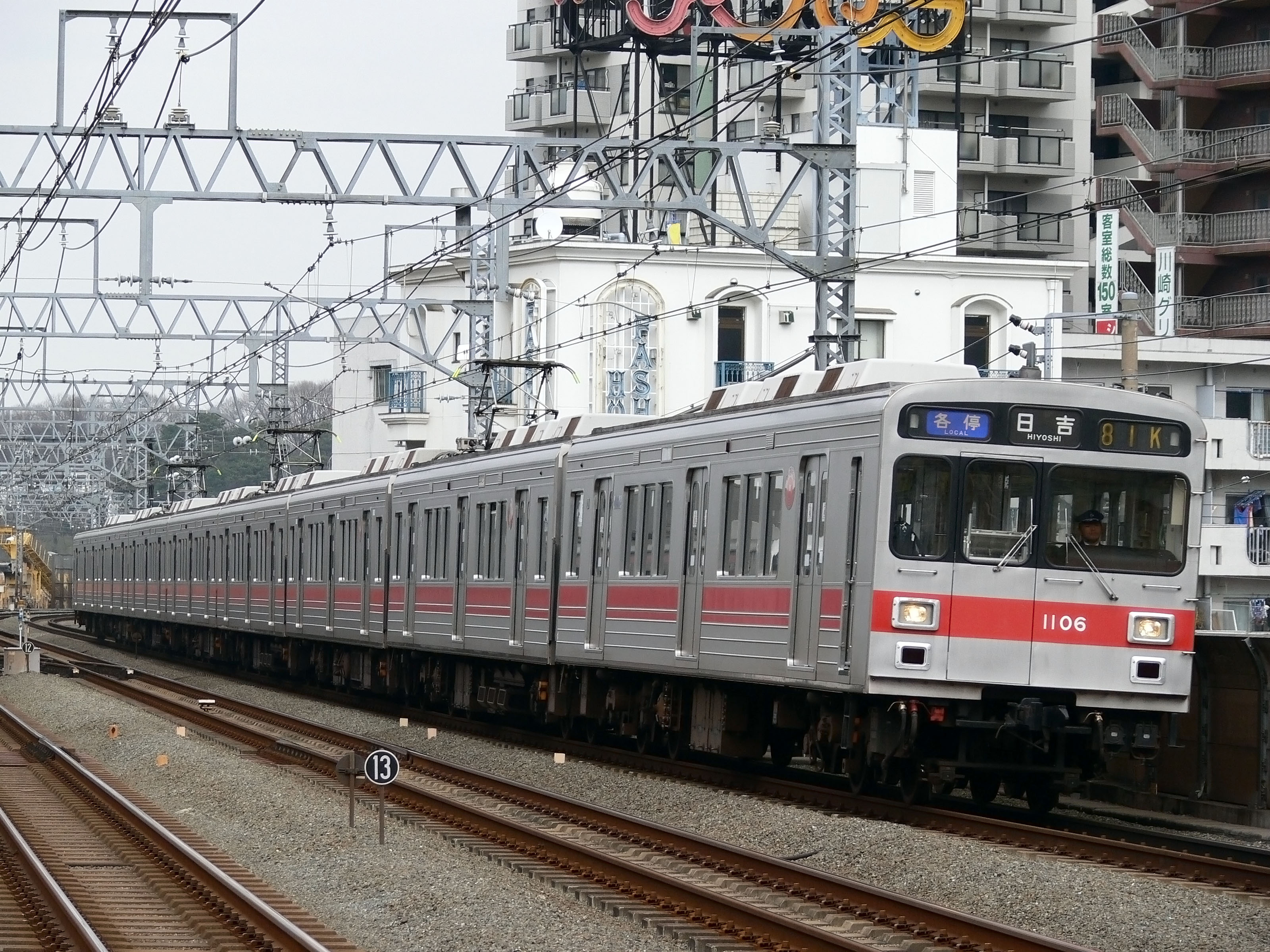
Tokyu 1000 series

== Tōzai Line ==
Tōzai Line trains are 20-meter-long 10-car formations, with four doors per side and longitudinal seating. The maximum operating speed is 100 km/h (62 mph).

=== Present ===
Tokyo Metro

- Tokyo Metro 05/05N series (since 1988)
- Tokyo Metro 07 series (since 2006) (transferred from Yūrakuchō Line)
- Tokyo Metro 15000 series (since 2010)

Tōyō Rapid Railway

- Tōyō Rapid 2000 series (since 2004)

East Japan Railway Company (JR East)

- JR East E231-800 series (since 2003)
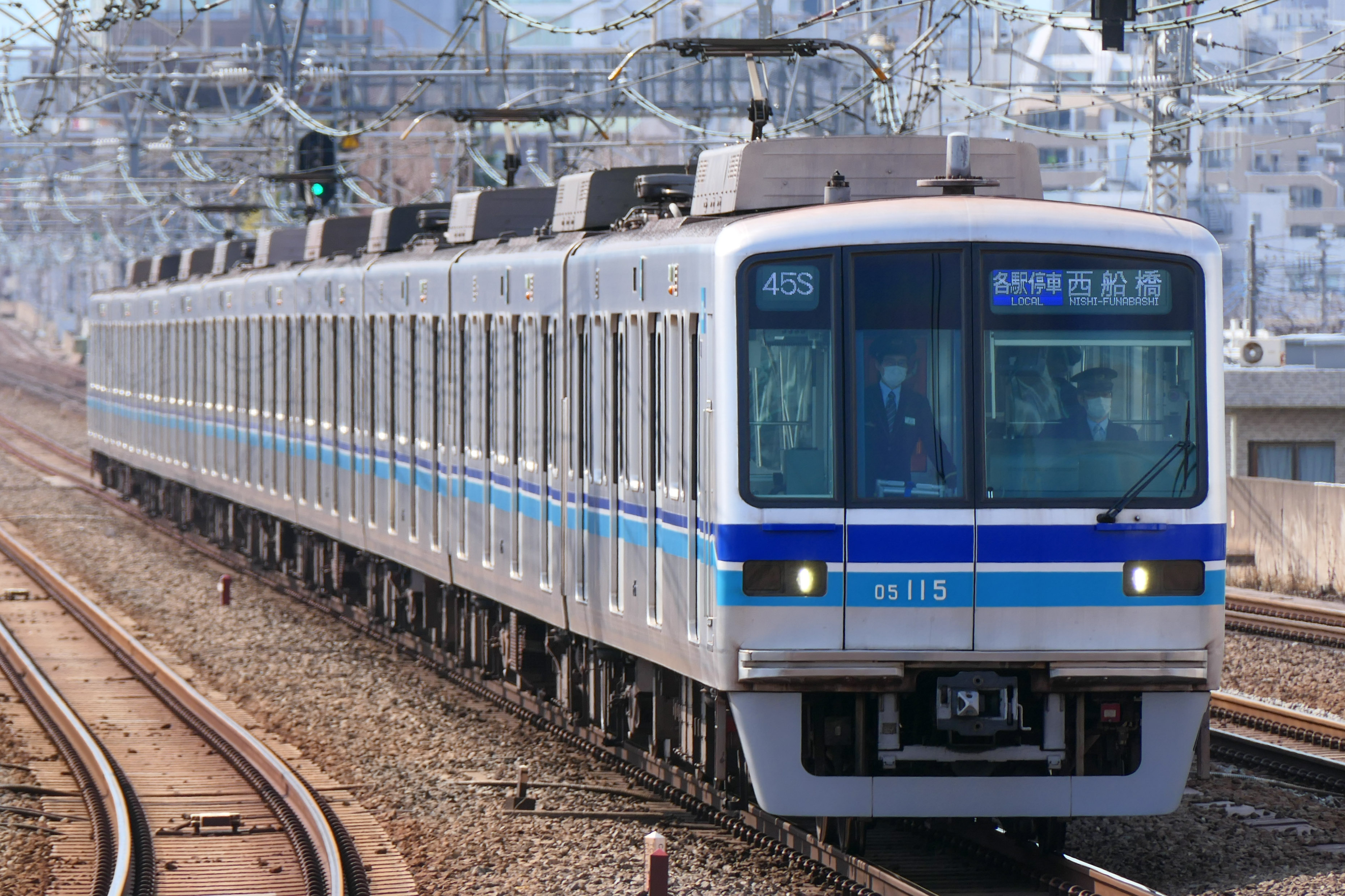
Tokyo Metro 05 series

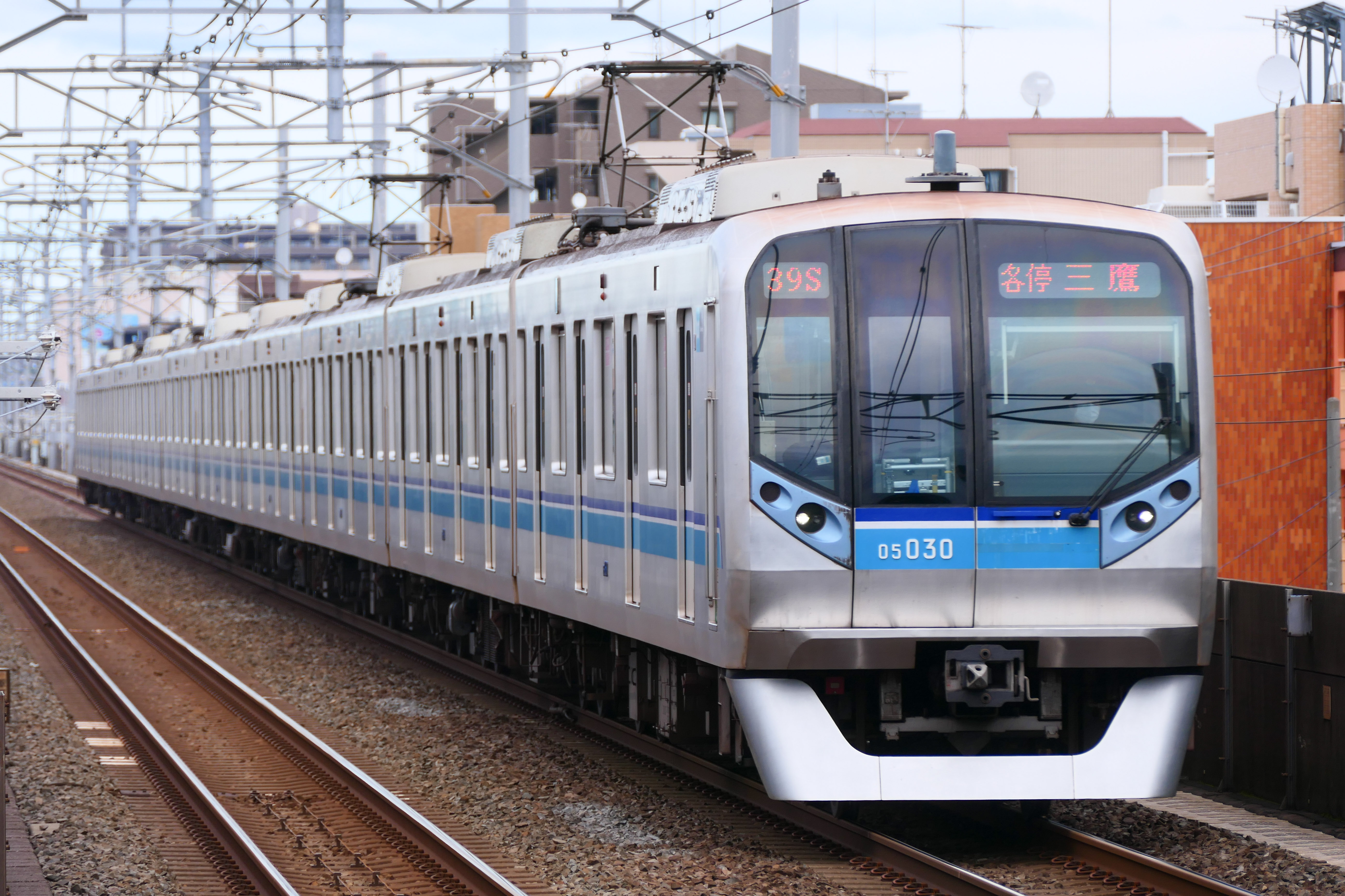
Tokyo Metro 05N series

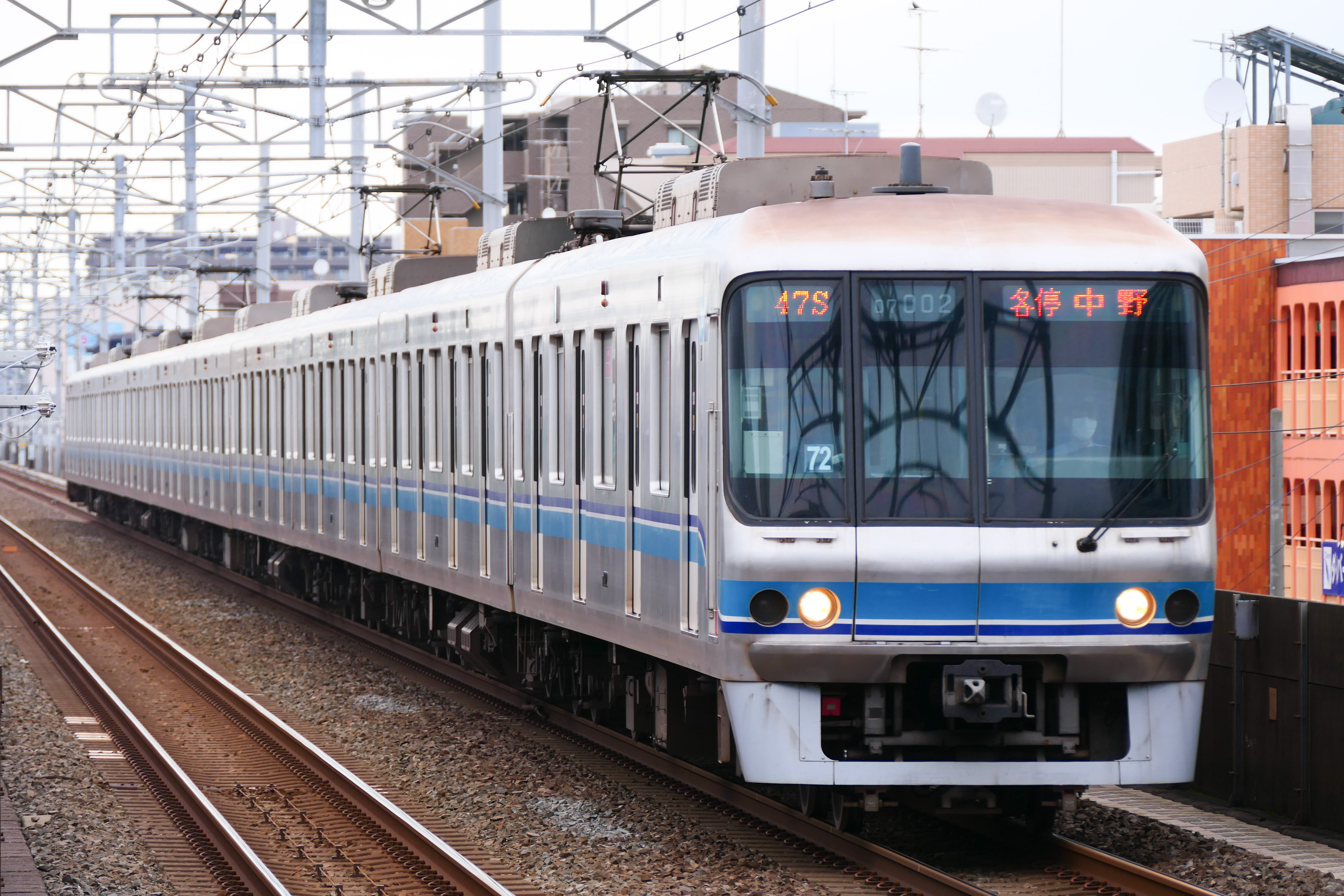
Tokyo Metro 07 series

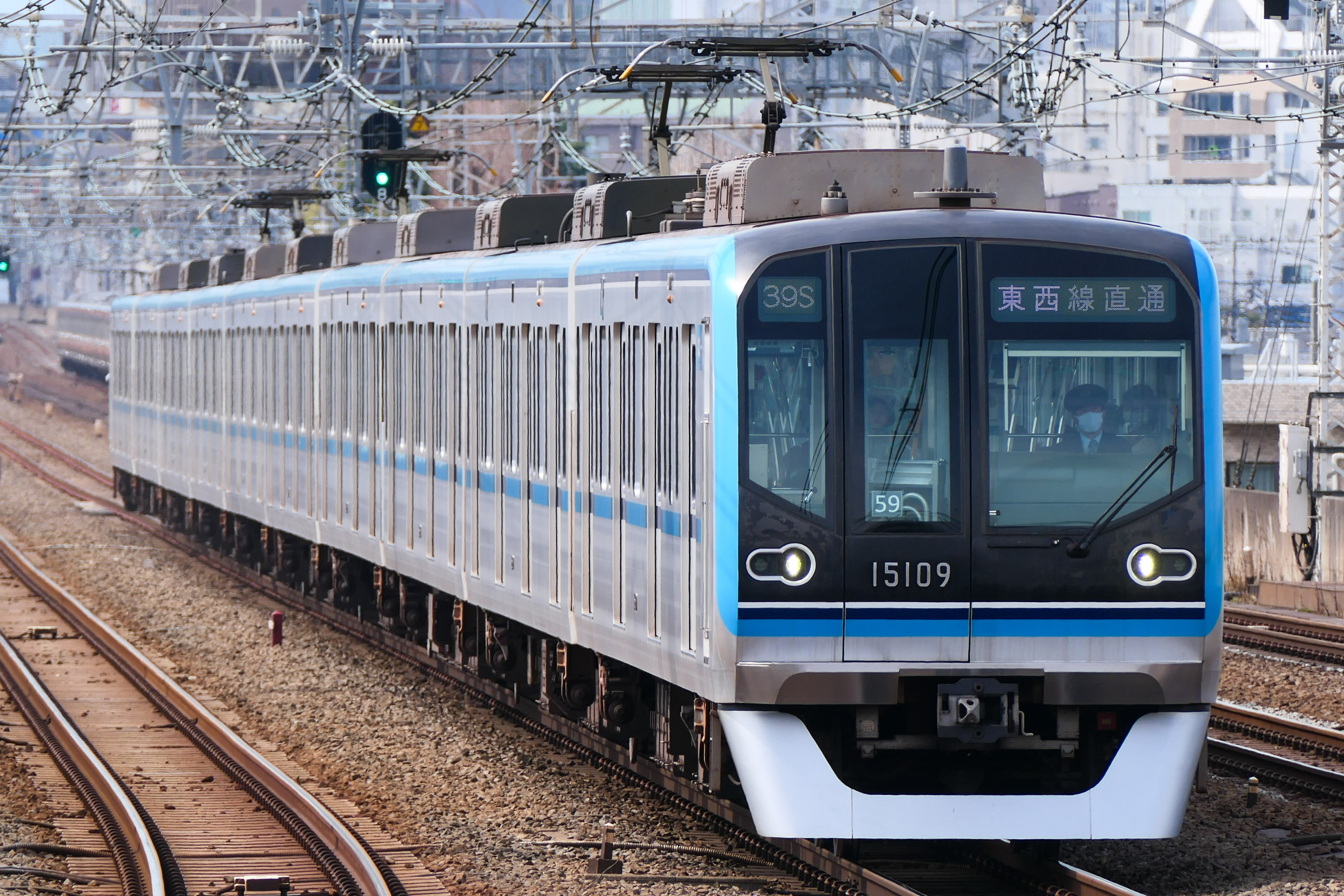
Tokyo Metro 15000 series

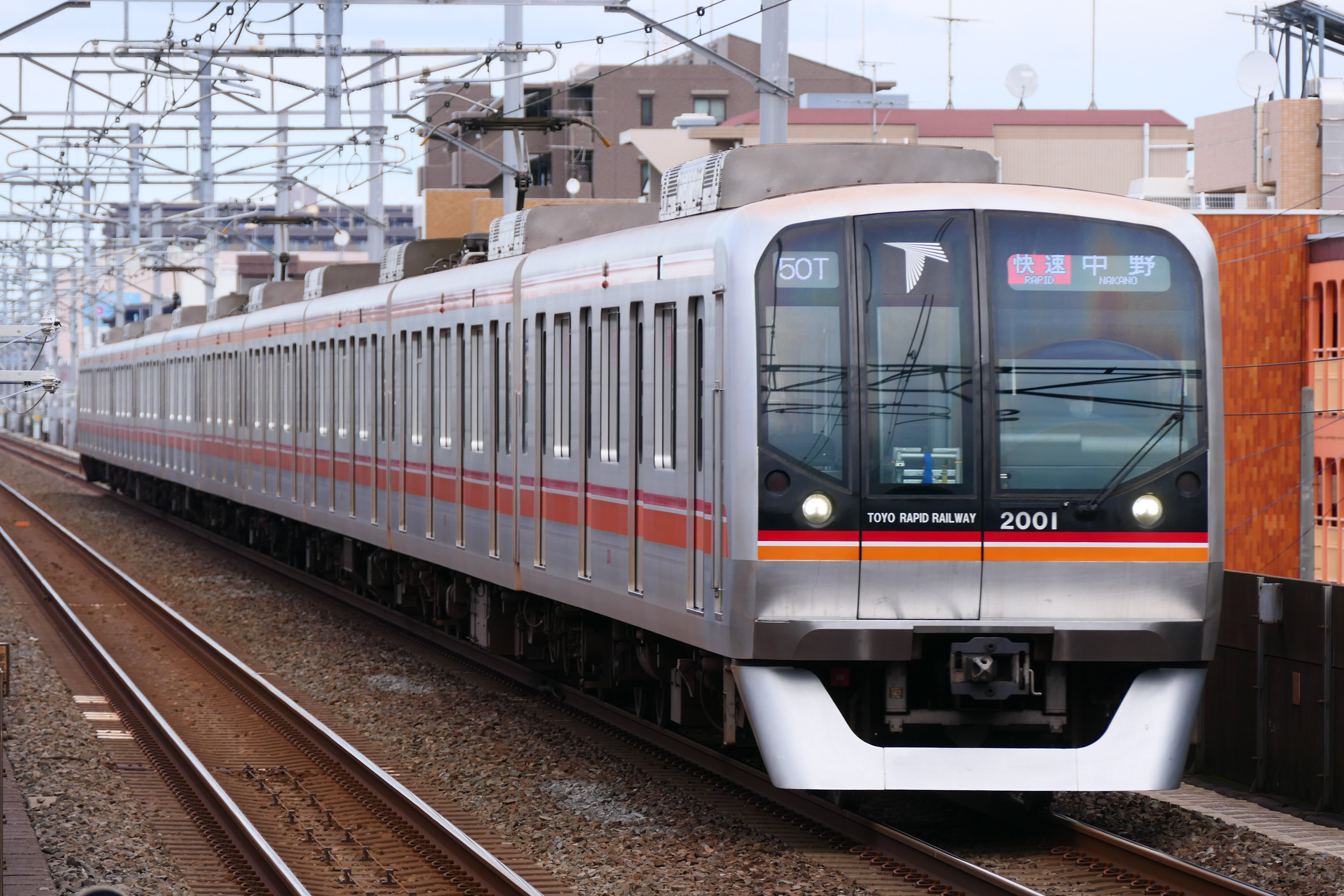
Toyo Rapid 2000 series

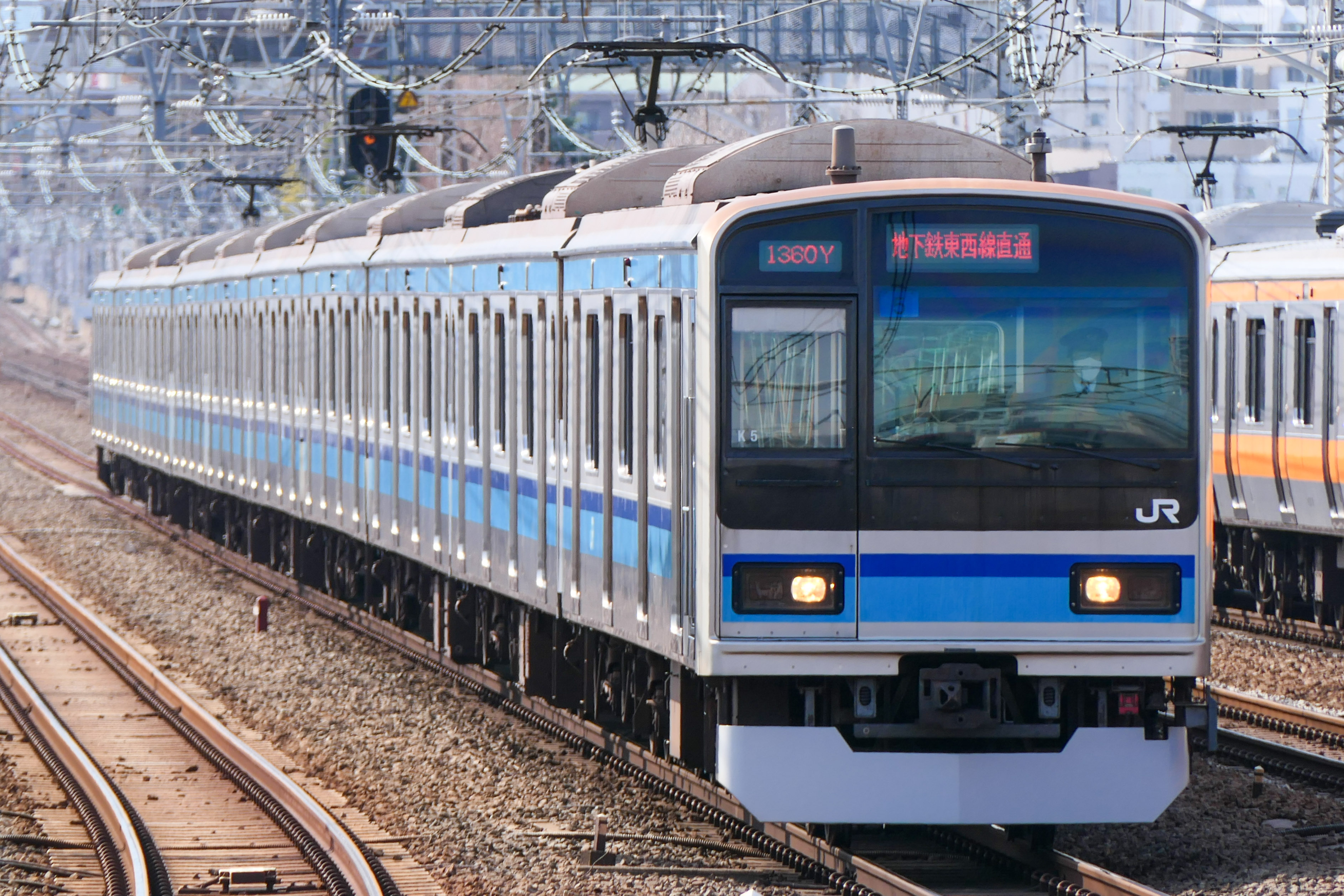
JR East E231-800 series

=== Former ===
TRTA/Tokyo Metro

- Tokyo Metro 5000 series (from 1964 until 2007)
- Tokyo Metro 8000 series (from 1987 until 1988, temporary, built for Hanzōmon Line)

JNR/JR East

- JR East 301 series (from 1966 until 2003)
- JR East 103–1000 series (from 1989 until 2003)
- JR East 103–1200 series (from 1971 until 2003)

Tōyō Rapid

- Tōyō Rapid 1000 series (from 1996 until 2006)
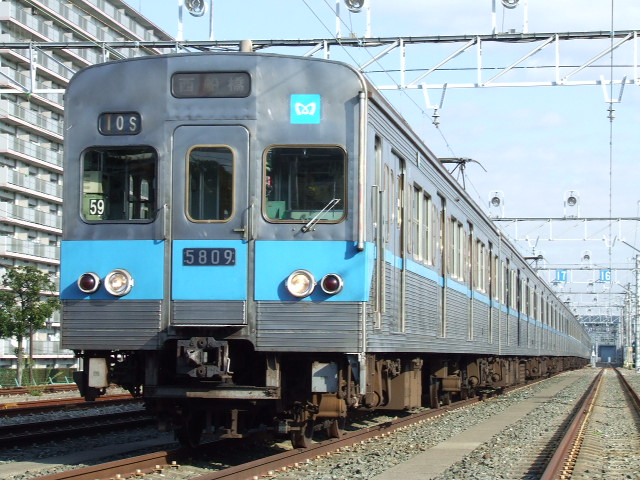
Tokyo Metro 5000 series

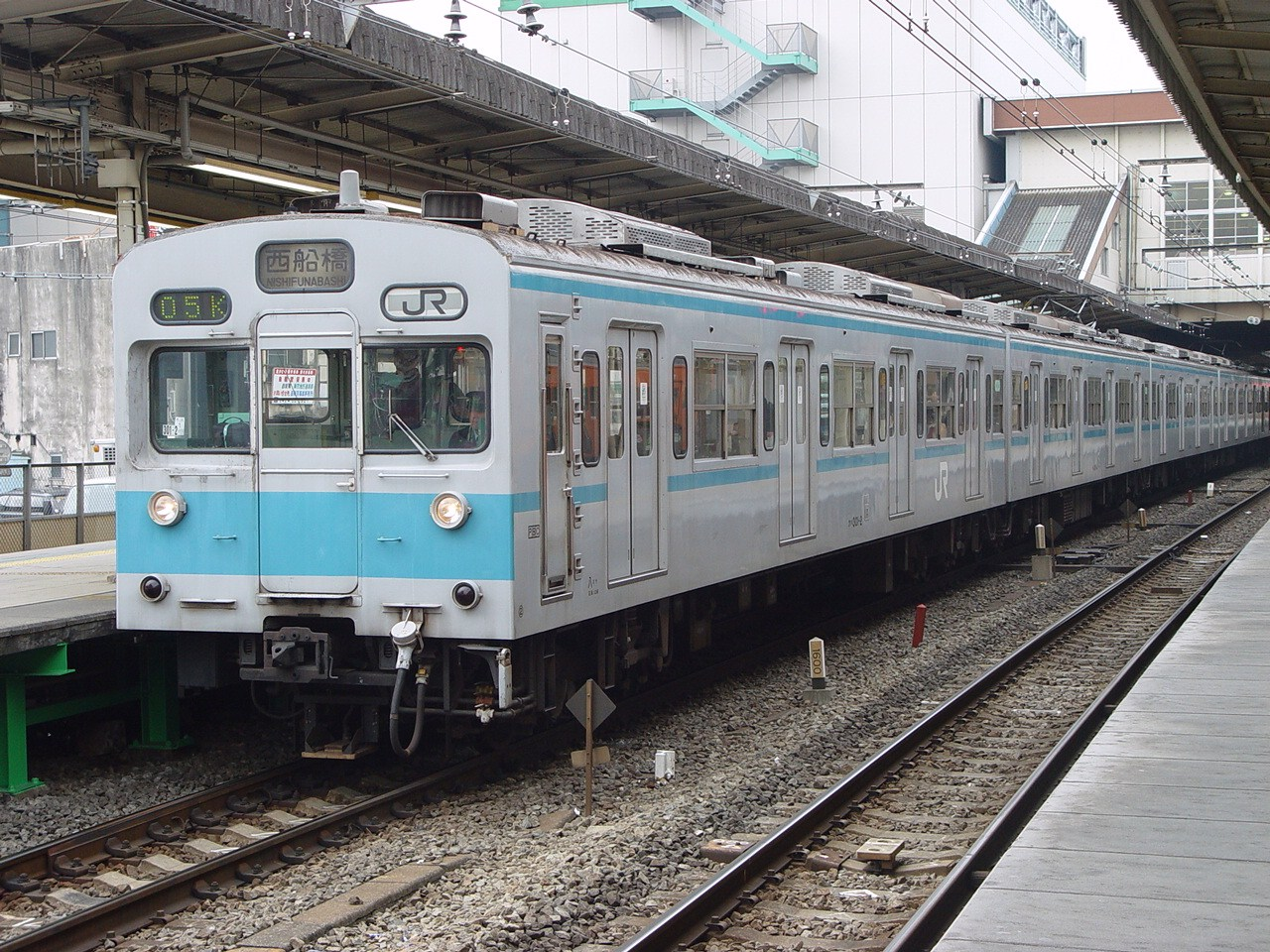
JR 301 series

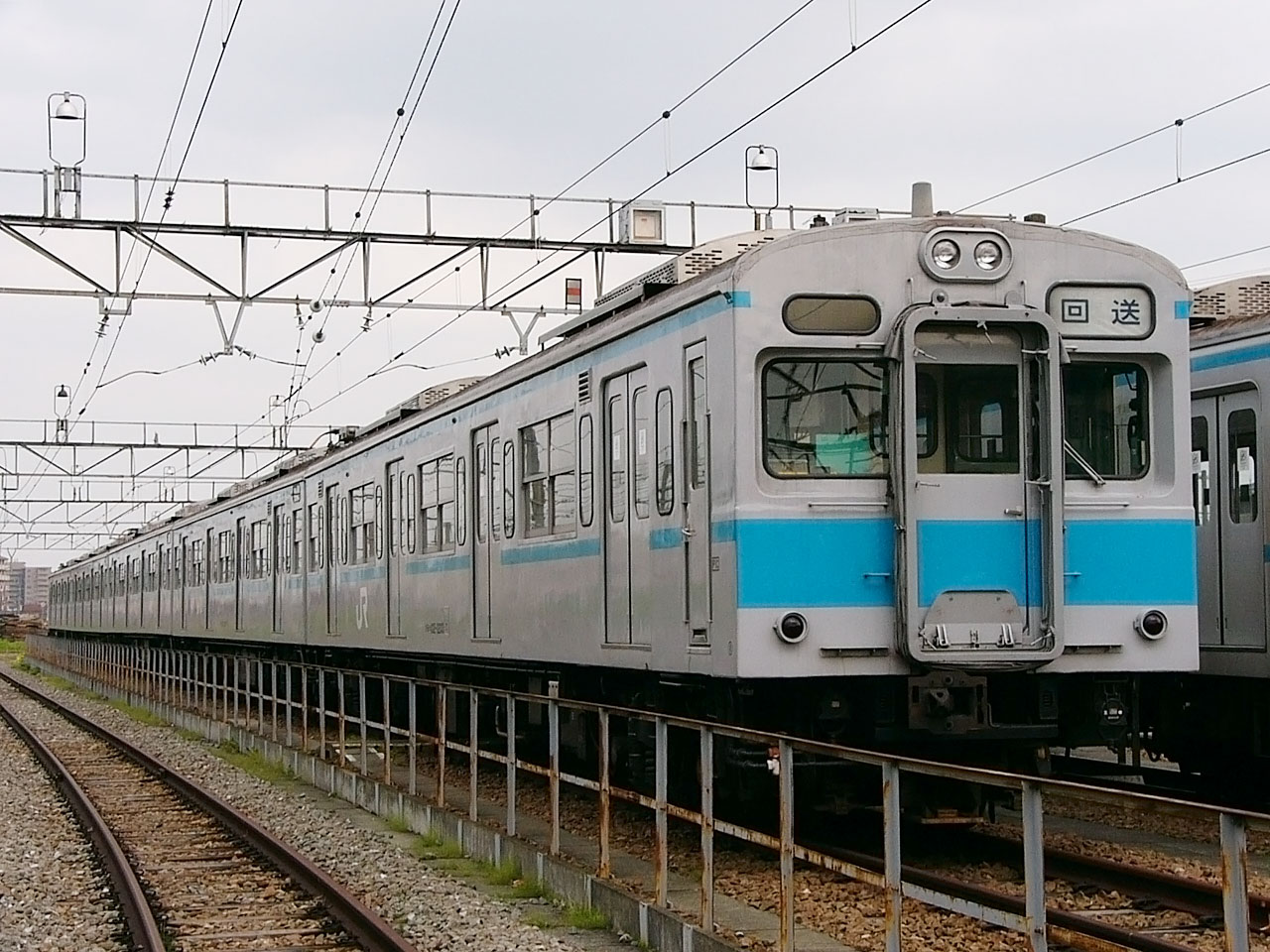
JR 103–1200 series

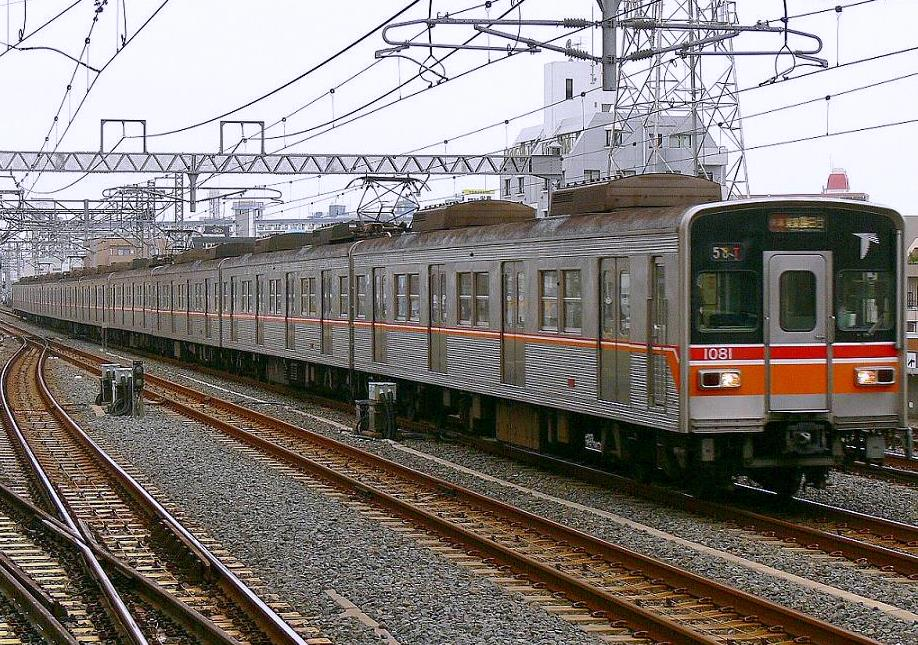
Tōyō Rapid 1000 series

== Chiyoda Line ==
Chiyoda Line trains are 20-meter-long 10-car formations, with four doors per side and longitudinal seating. Kita-Ayase Branch service trains run in three-car formations.

=== Present ===
Tokyo Metro

- Tokyo Metro 16000 series (since November 2010)
- Tokyo Metro 05 series (since April 2014, used on Kita-Ayase Branch in 3-car formations)

Odakyu Electric Railway

- Odakyu 4000 series (since September 2007)
- Odakyu 60000 series MSE (since spring 2008, used for Metro Hakone, Metro Enoshima, Metro Morning Way and Metro Home Way)

JR East

- JR East E233-2000 series (since summer 2009)
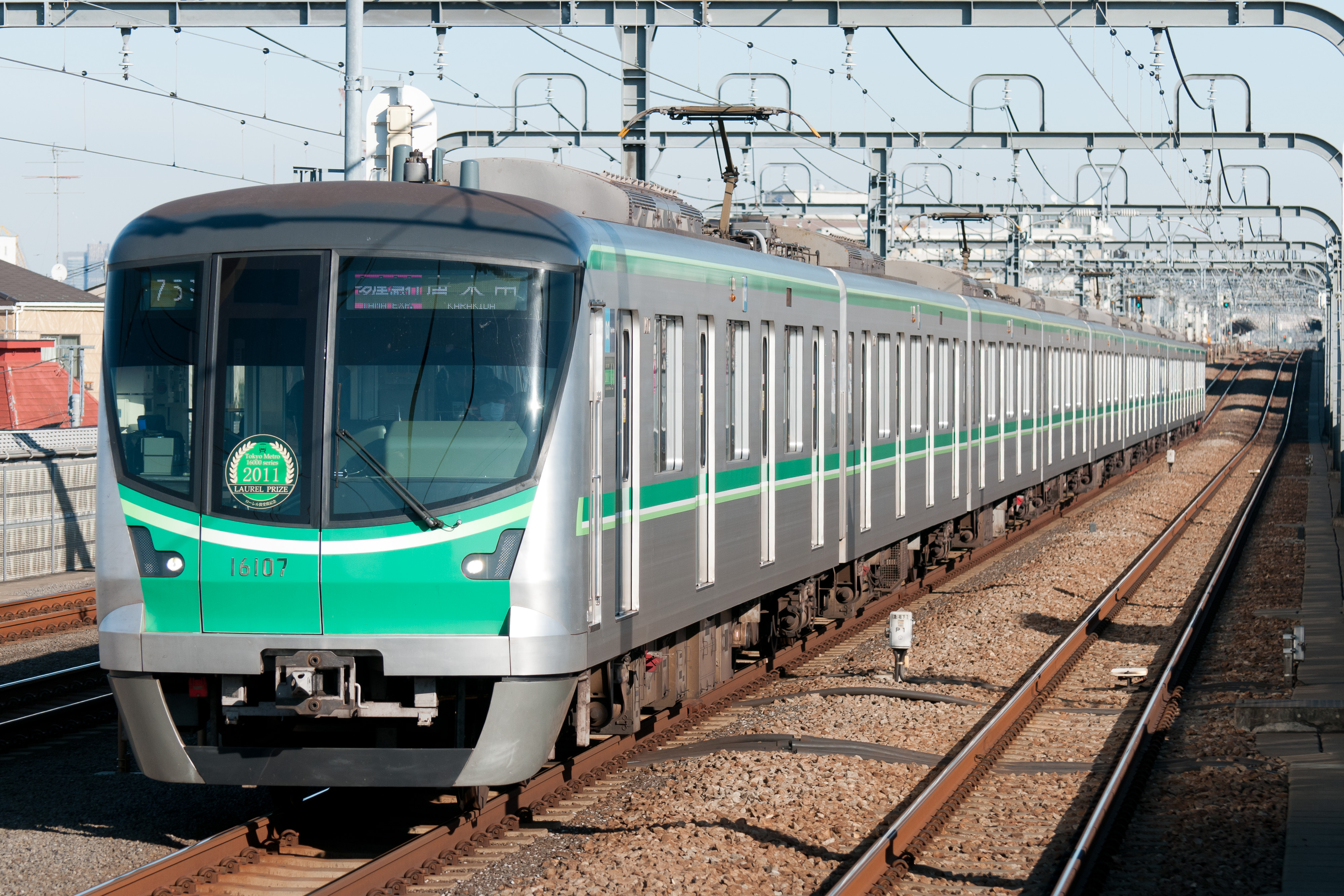
Tokyo Metro 16000 series

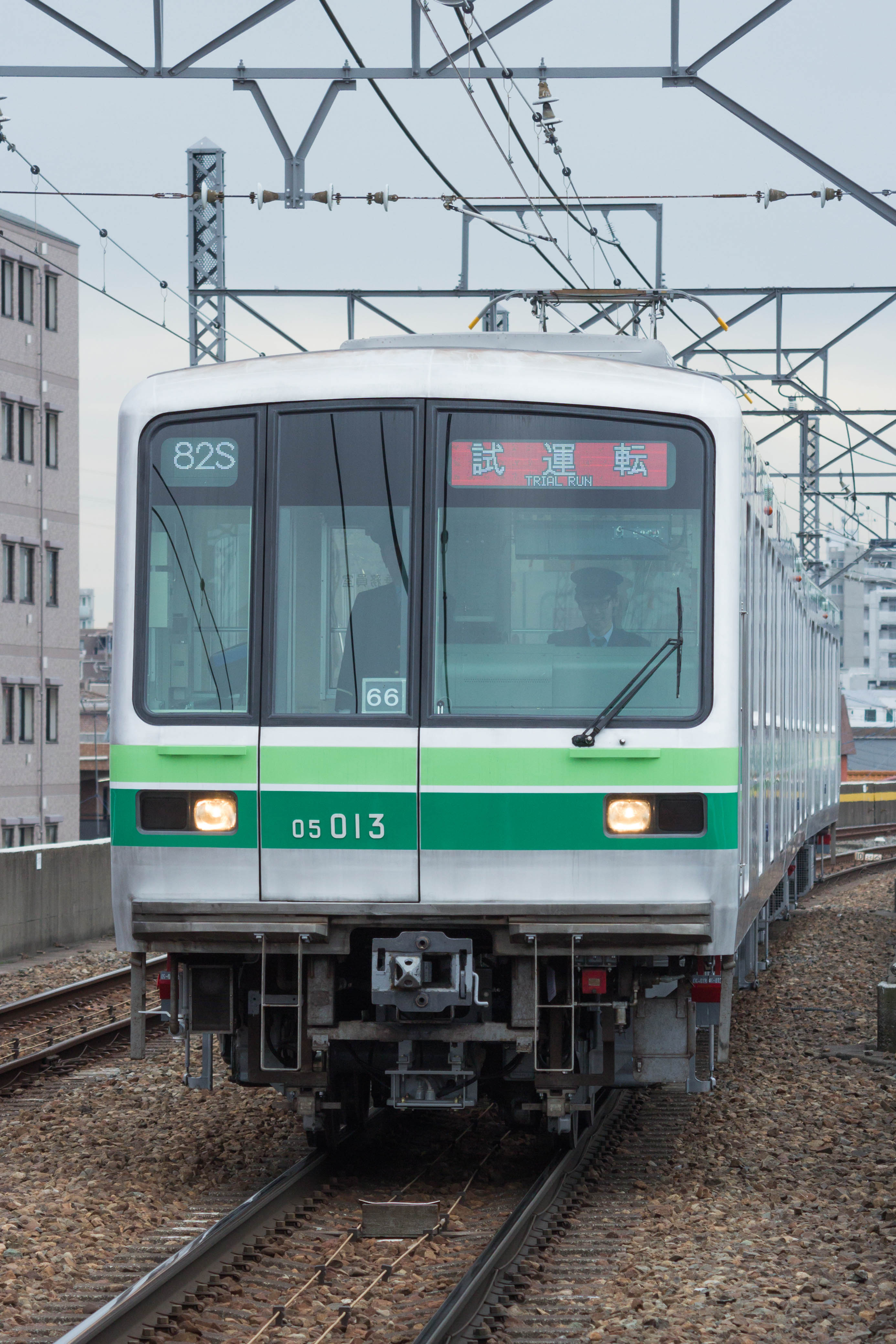
Tokyo Metro 05 series

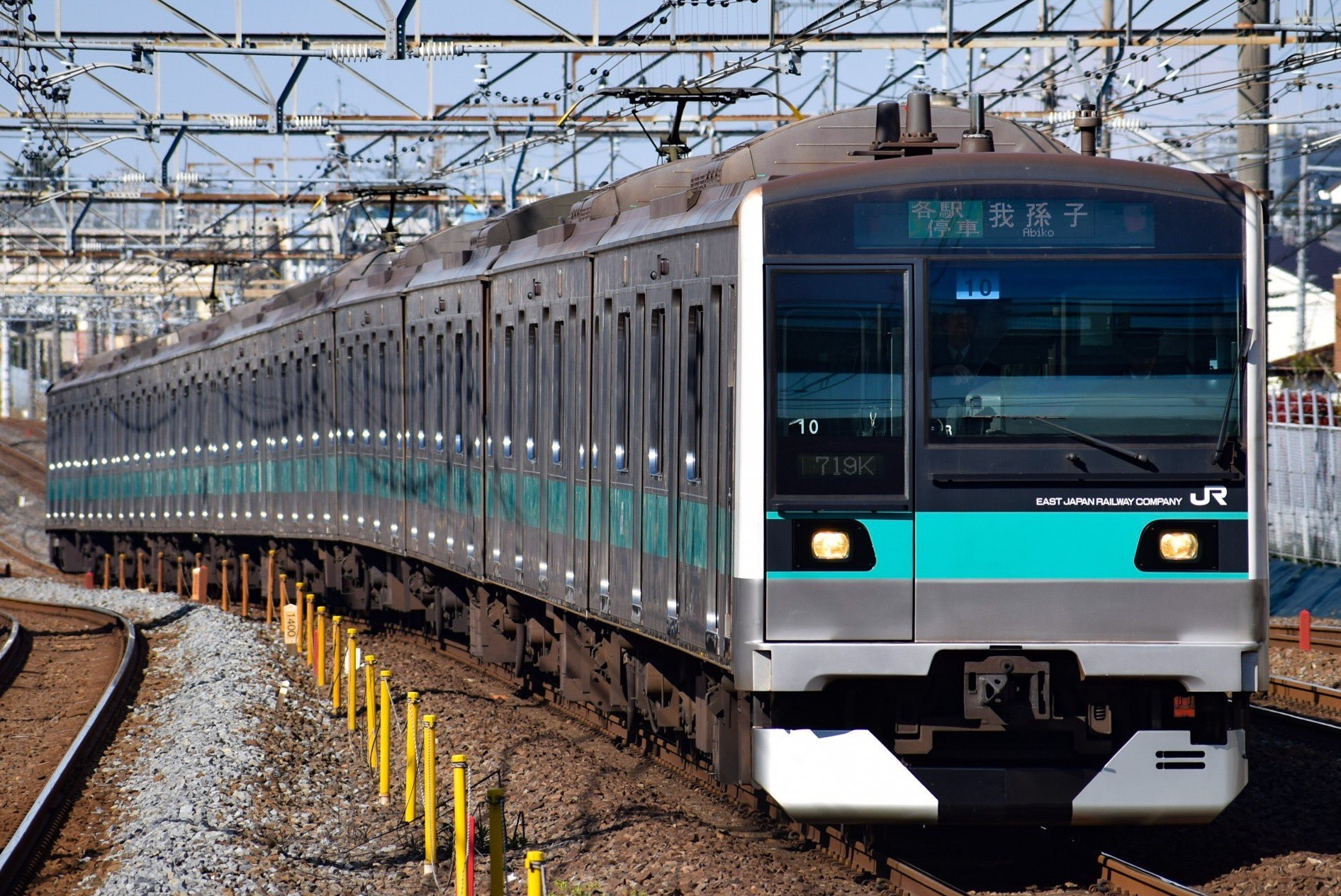
JR East E233-2000 series

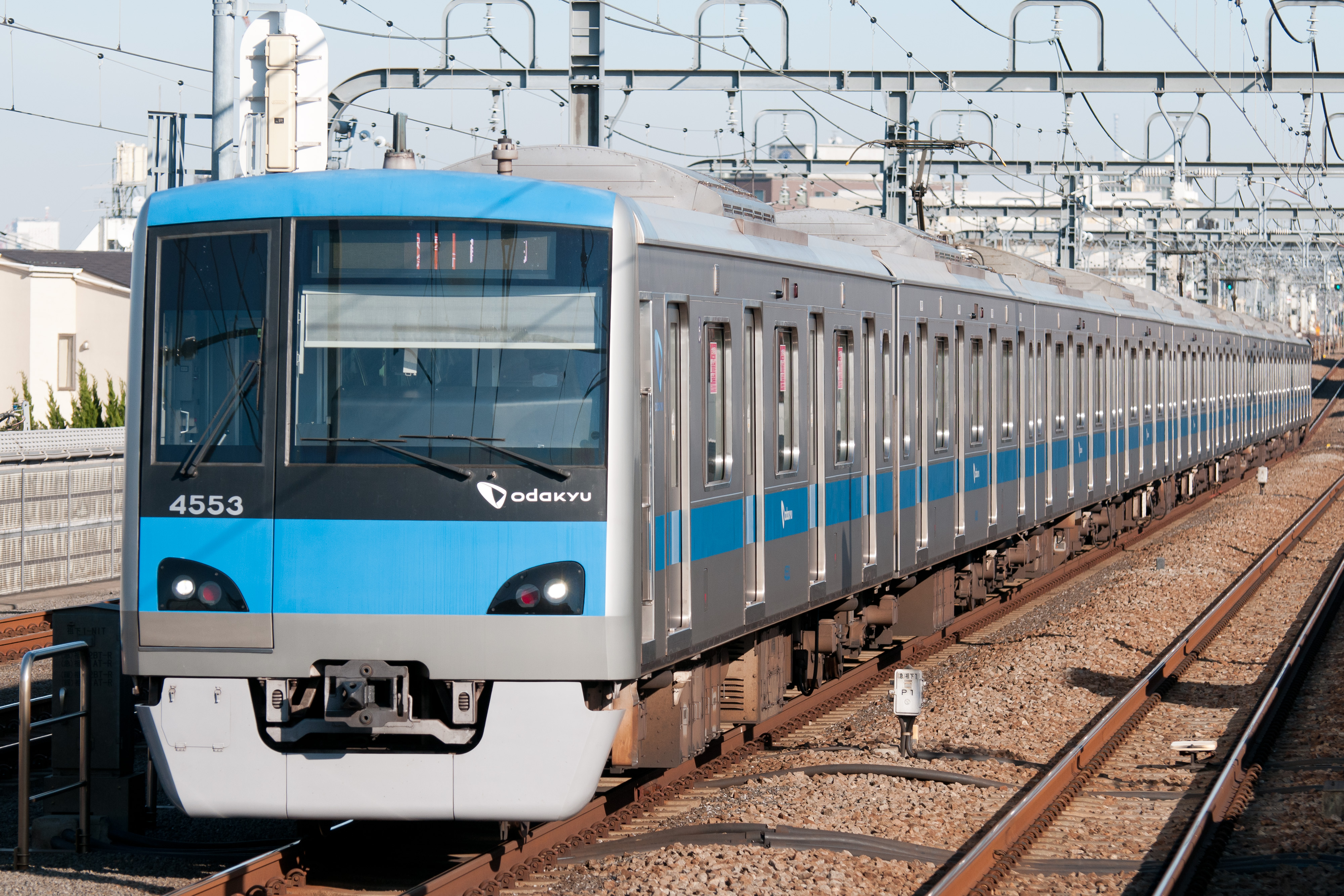
Odakyu 4000 series

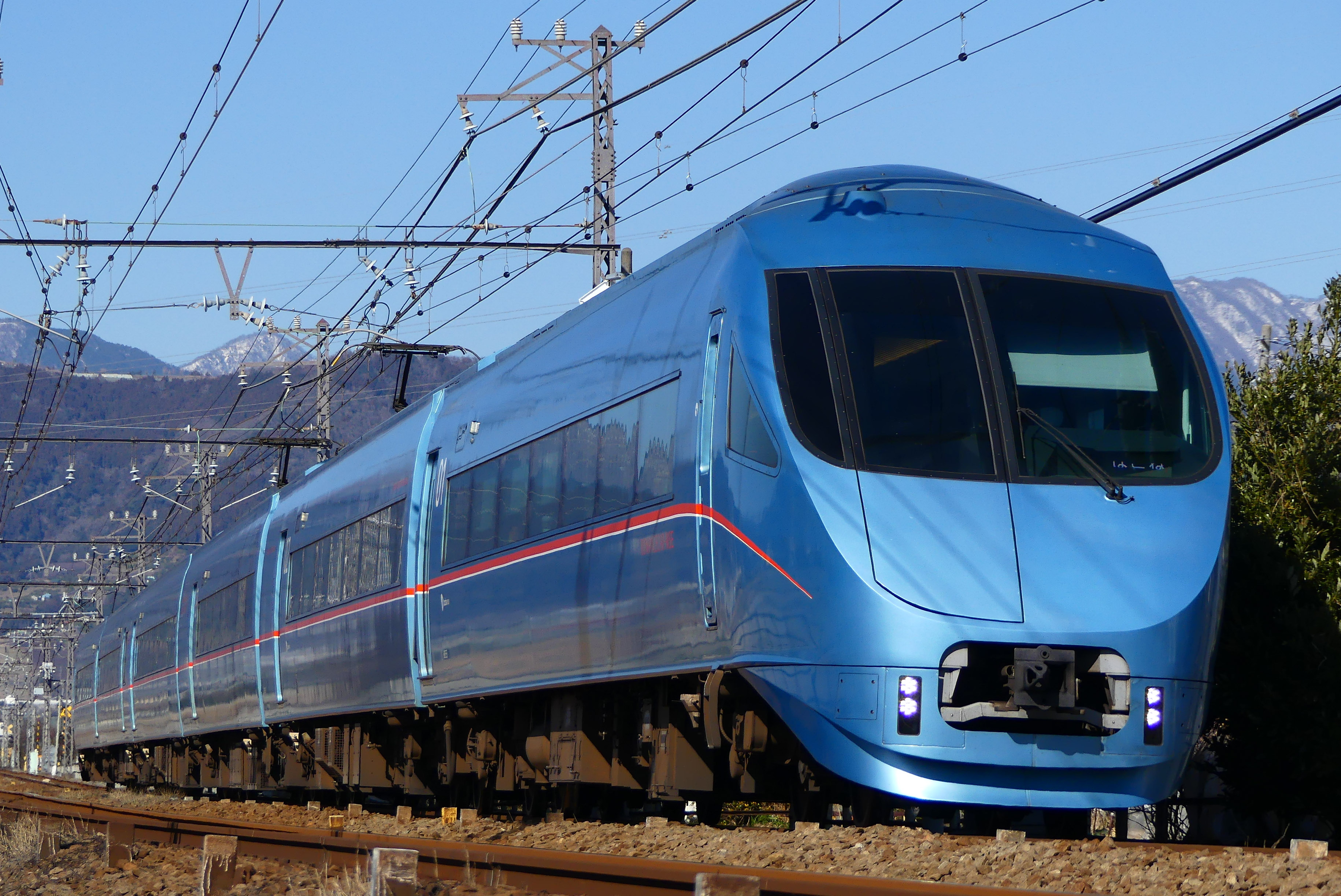
Odakyu 60000 series

=== Former ===
TRTA/Tokyo Metro

- Tokyo Metro 5000 series (from 1969 until 2014, used on Kita-Ayase Branch in 3-car formations)
- Tokyo Metro 6000 series (prototype built in 1968, used on Kita-Ayase Branch in 3-car formation)
- Tokyo Metro 06 series (from 1993 until January 2015)
- Tokyo Metro 07 series (from September until December 2008, transferred to Tōzai Line)
- Tokyo Metro 6000 series (from 1971 until November 2018)

Odakyu

- Odakyu 9000 series (from 1978 until 1990)
- Odakyu 1000 series (from 1989 until 2010)

JNR/JR East

- JR 103 series (from 1970 until 1986; transferred to Joban Line rapid services afterwards)
- JR 203 series (from 1982 until September 2011; 90 were transferred to overseas operations)
- JR 207–900 series (from 1986 until December 2009)
- JR 209–1000 series (x2) (from December 1999 until October 2018; transferred to Chuo Line Rapid Service by December 2018.)
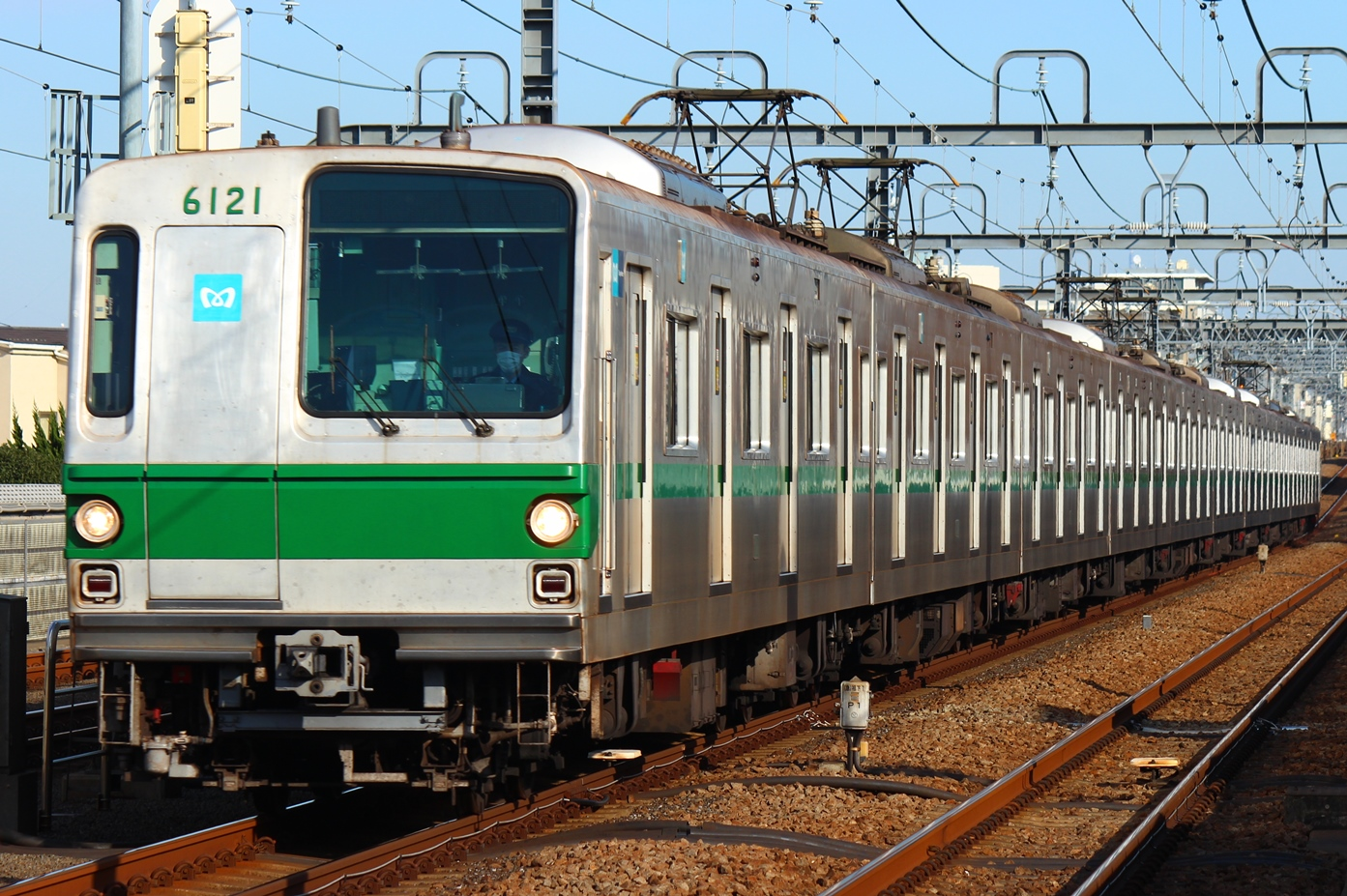
Tokyo Metro 6000 series

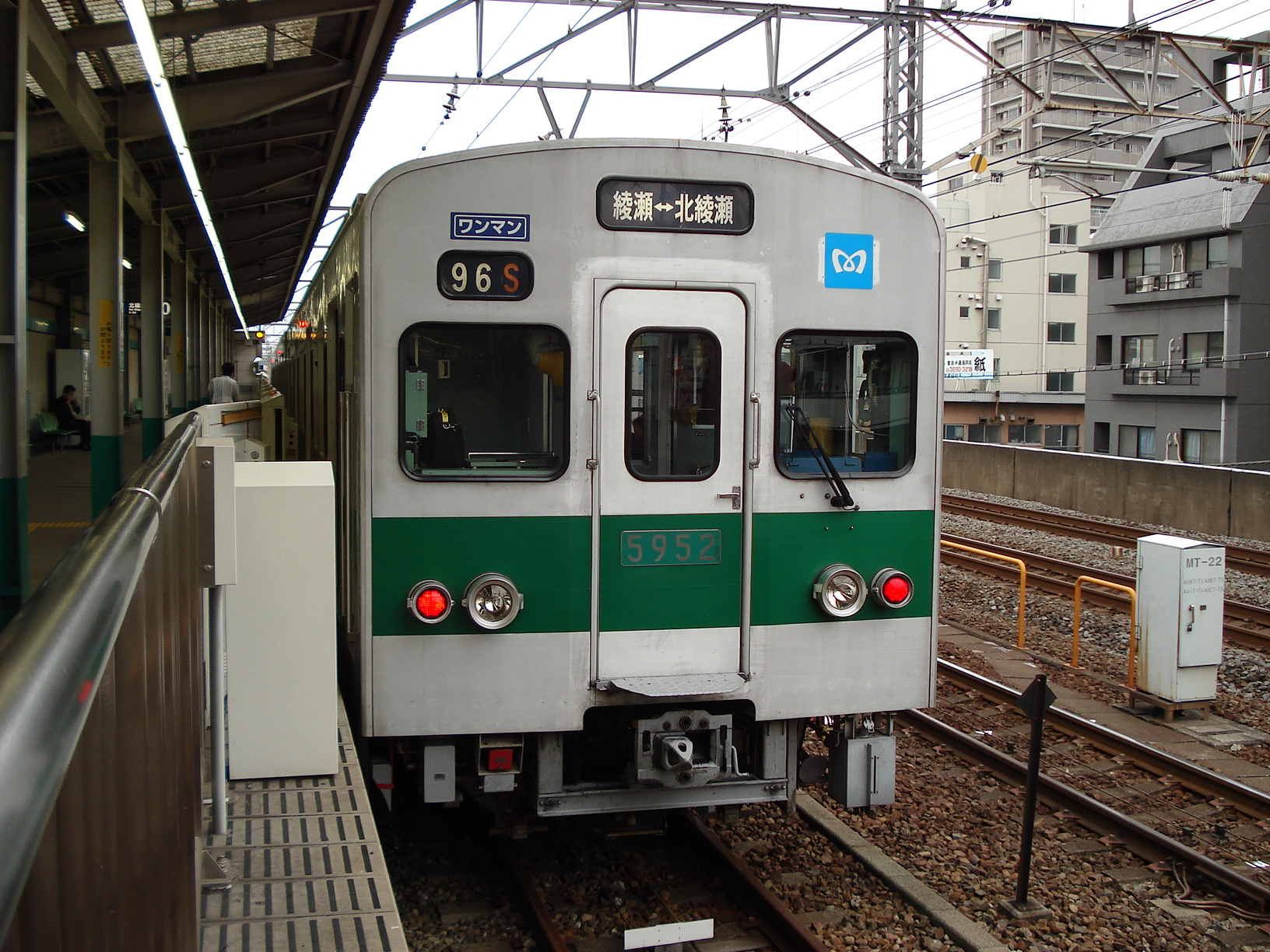
Tokyo Metro 5000 series

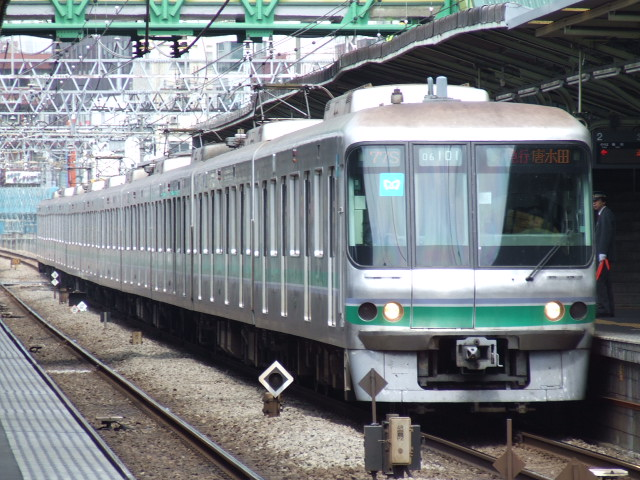
Tokyo Metro 06 series

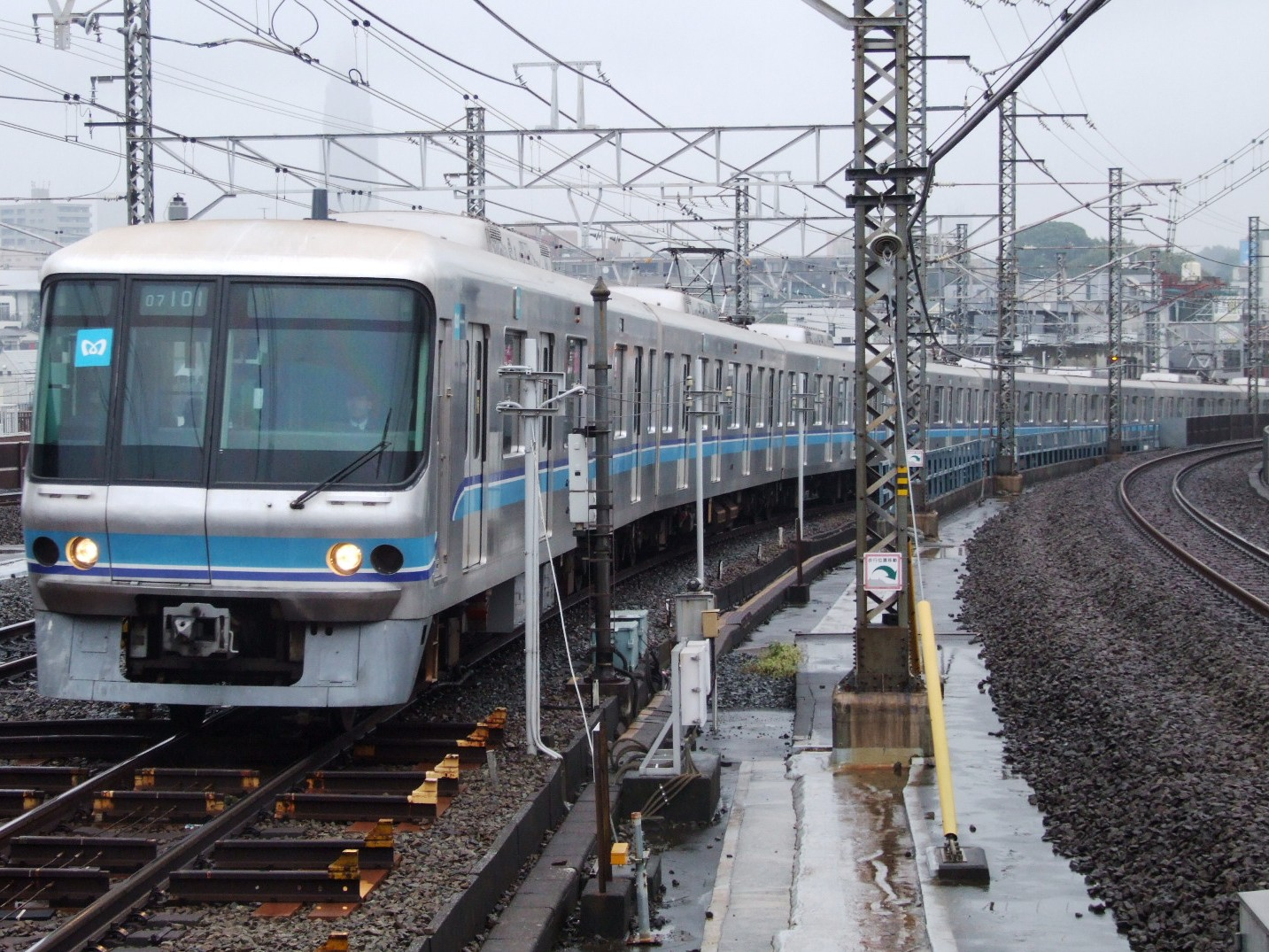
Tokyo Metro 07 series

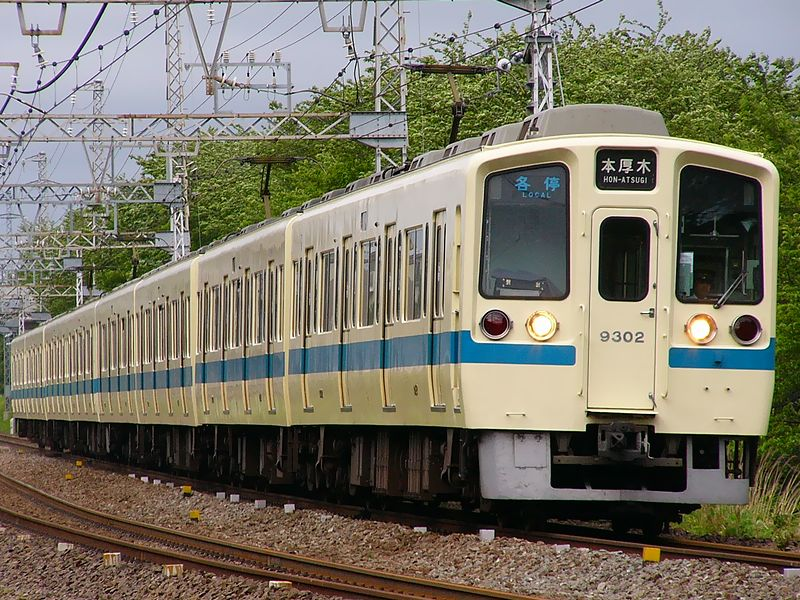
Odakyu 9000 series

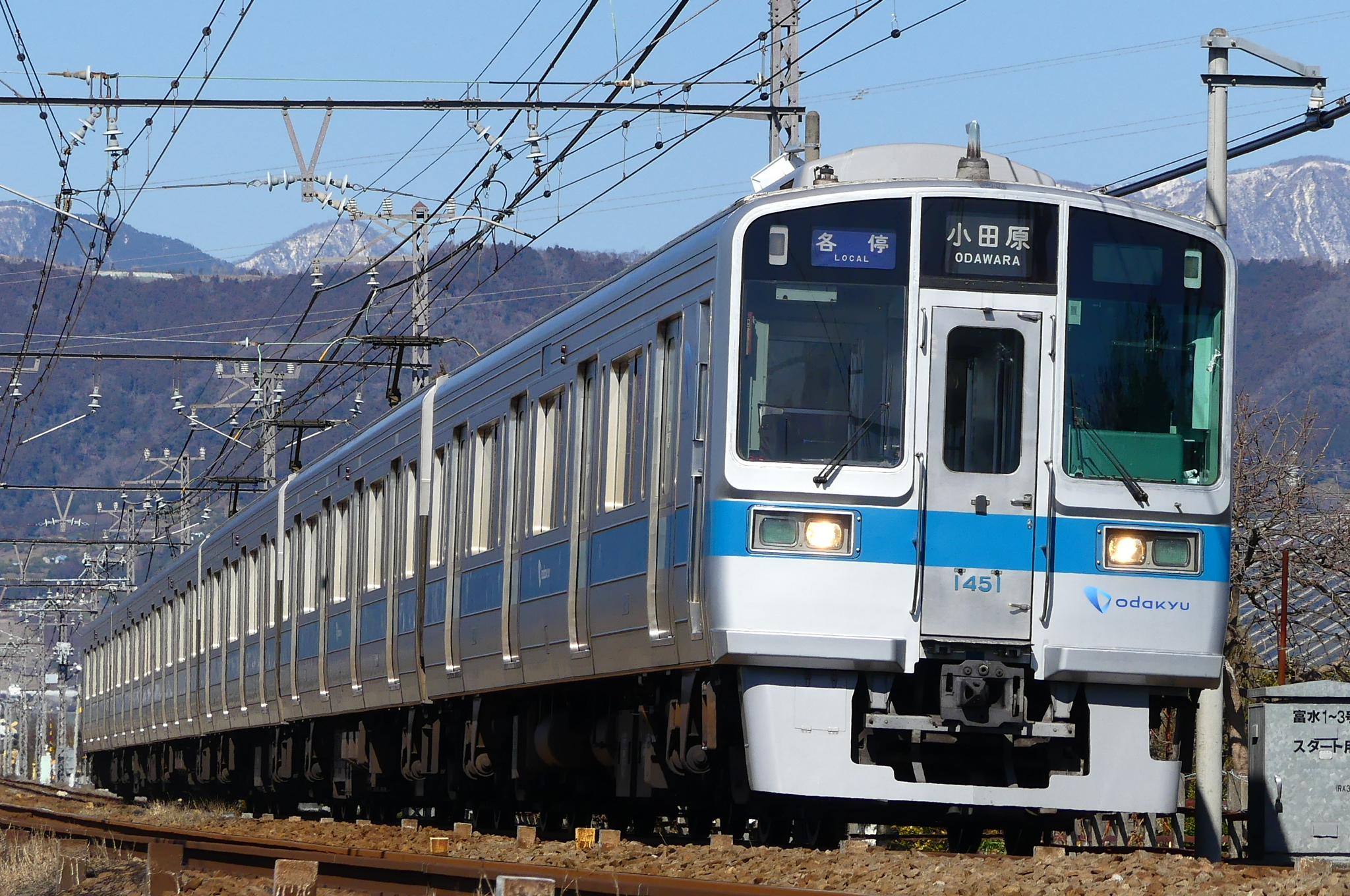
Odakyu 1000 series

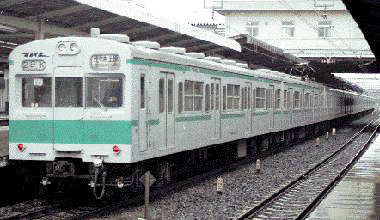
JR 103–1000 series

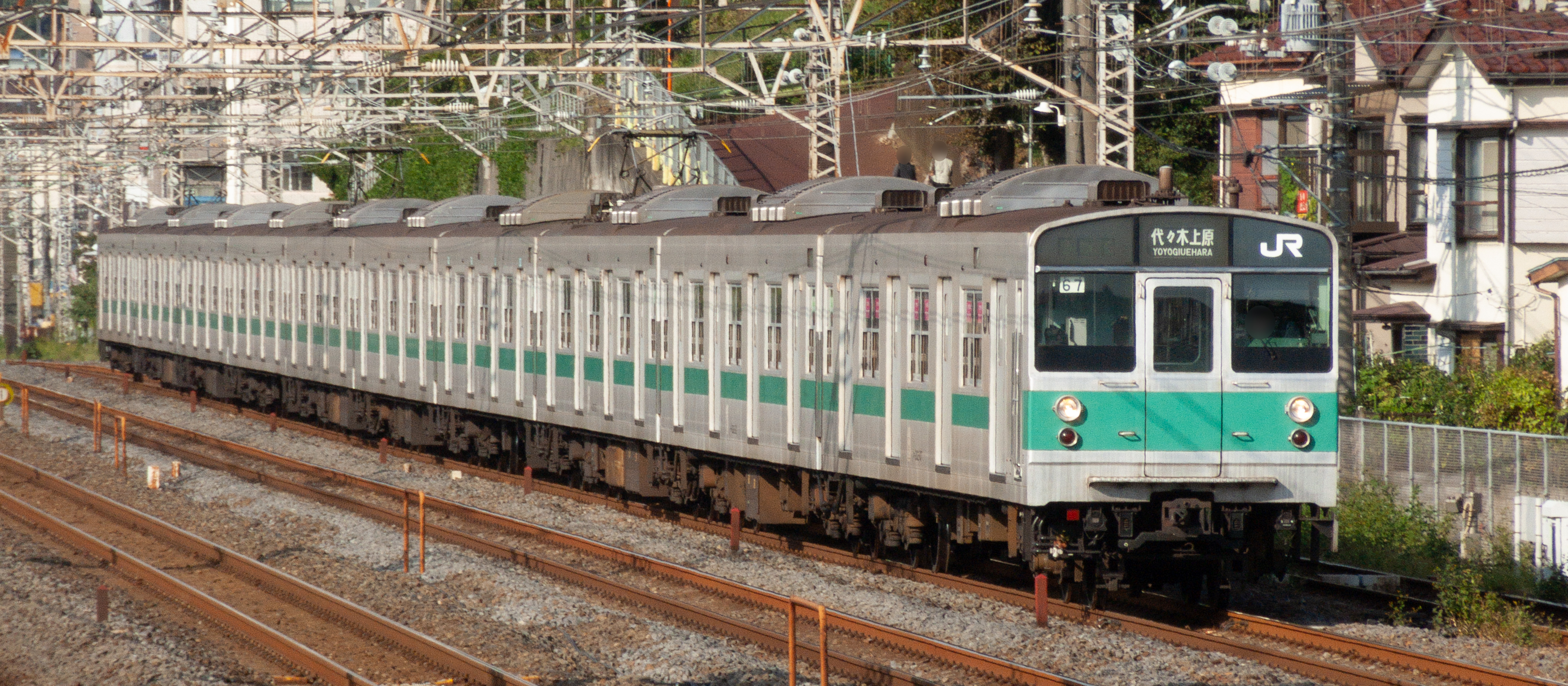
JR 203 series

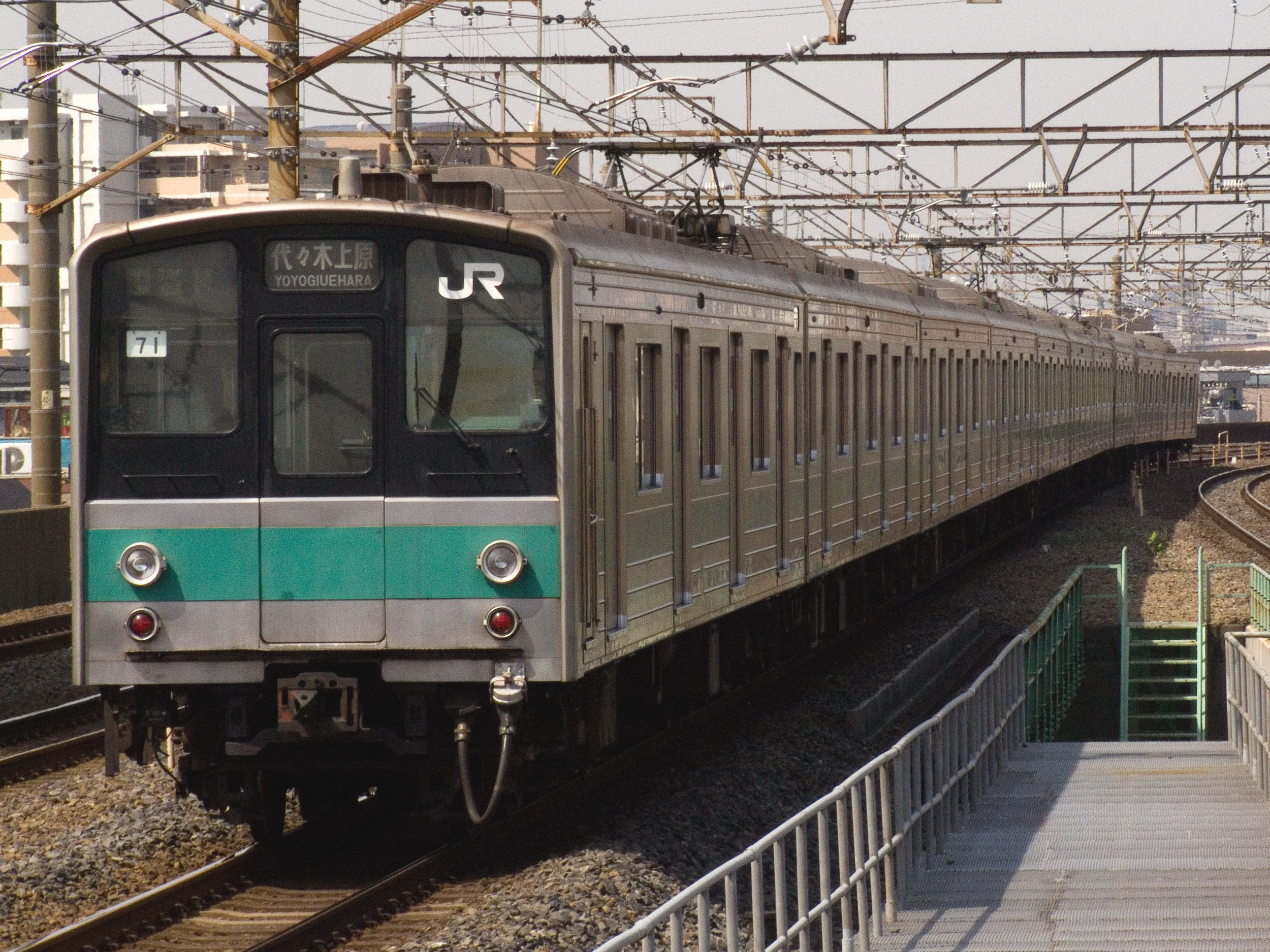
JR 207–900 series

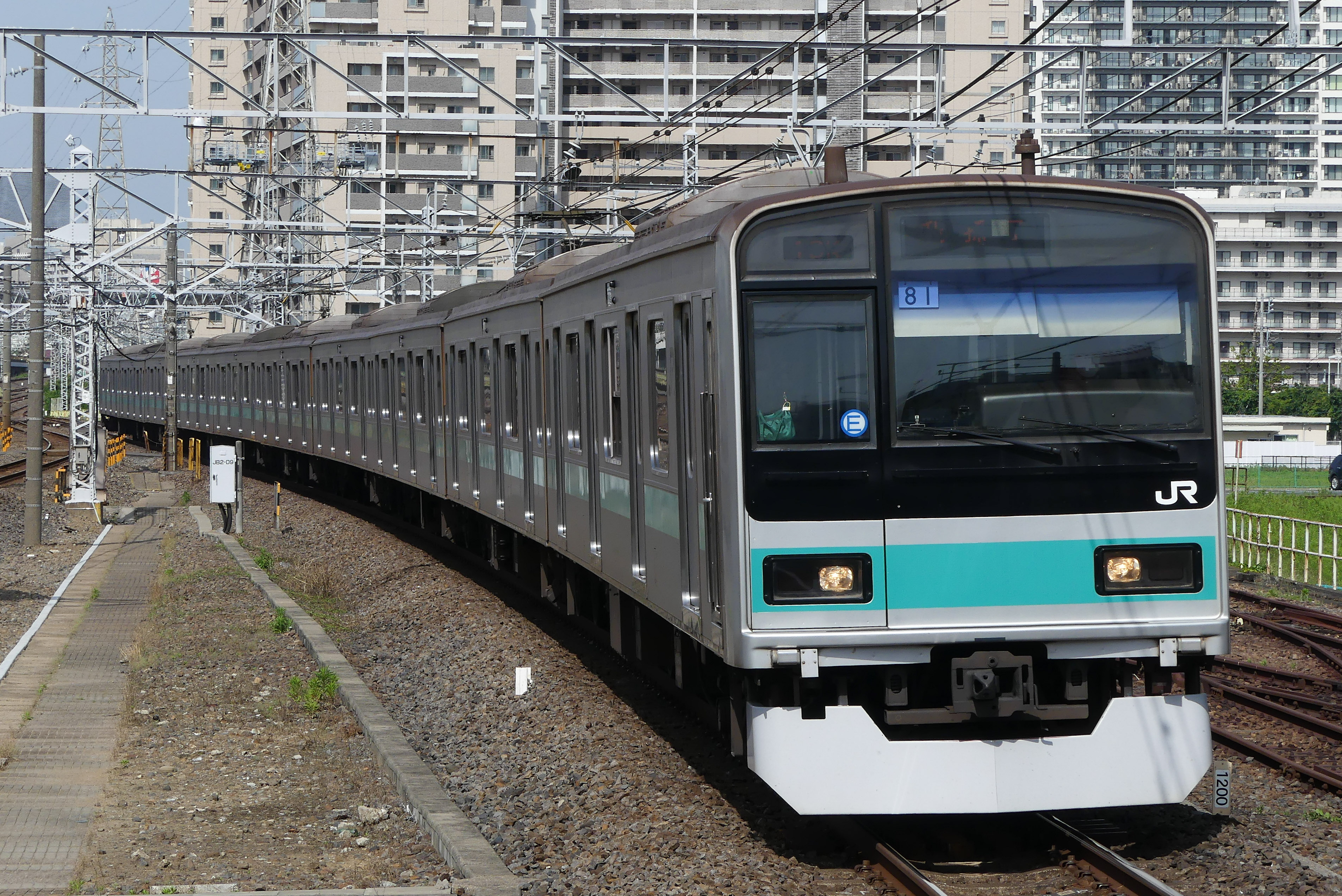
JR East 209–1000 series

== Yūrakuchō and Fukutoshin Lines ==
Yūrakuchō and Fukutoshin Line trains are 20-meter-long 10-car (8-car for some Fukutoshin Line trains) formations, with four doors per side and longitudinal seating.

=== Present ===
Tokyo Metro

- Tokyo Metro 10000 series (10-car sets) (since September 2006)
- Tokyo Metro 17000 series (8/10-car sets) (since February 2021)

Tobu Railway

- Tobu 9000/9050 series (10-car sets) (since 1987)
- Tobu 50070 series (10-car sets) (since July 2007)

Seibu Railway

- Seibu 6000/6050 series (10-car sets) (since 1998)
- Seibu 40000 series (10-car sets) (since 25 March 2017, used for S-Train)

Tokyu Corporation and Yokohama Minatomirai Railway (Fukutoshin Line only)

- Tokyu 5000 series (II) (8-car sets) (since 16 March 2013)
- Tokyu 5050 series (8-car sets) (since 16 March 2013)
- Tokyu 5050–4000 series (10-car sets) (since 10 September 2012)
- Yokohama Minatomirai Railway Y500 series (8-car sets) (since 16 March 2013)

Sagami Railway (Sotetsu) (Fukutoshin Line only)

- Sotetsu 20000 series (10-car sets) (since 18 March 2023)
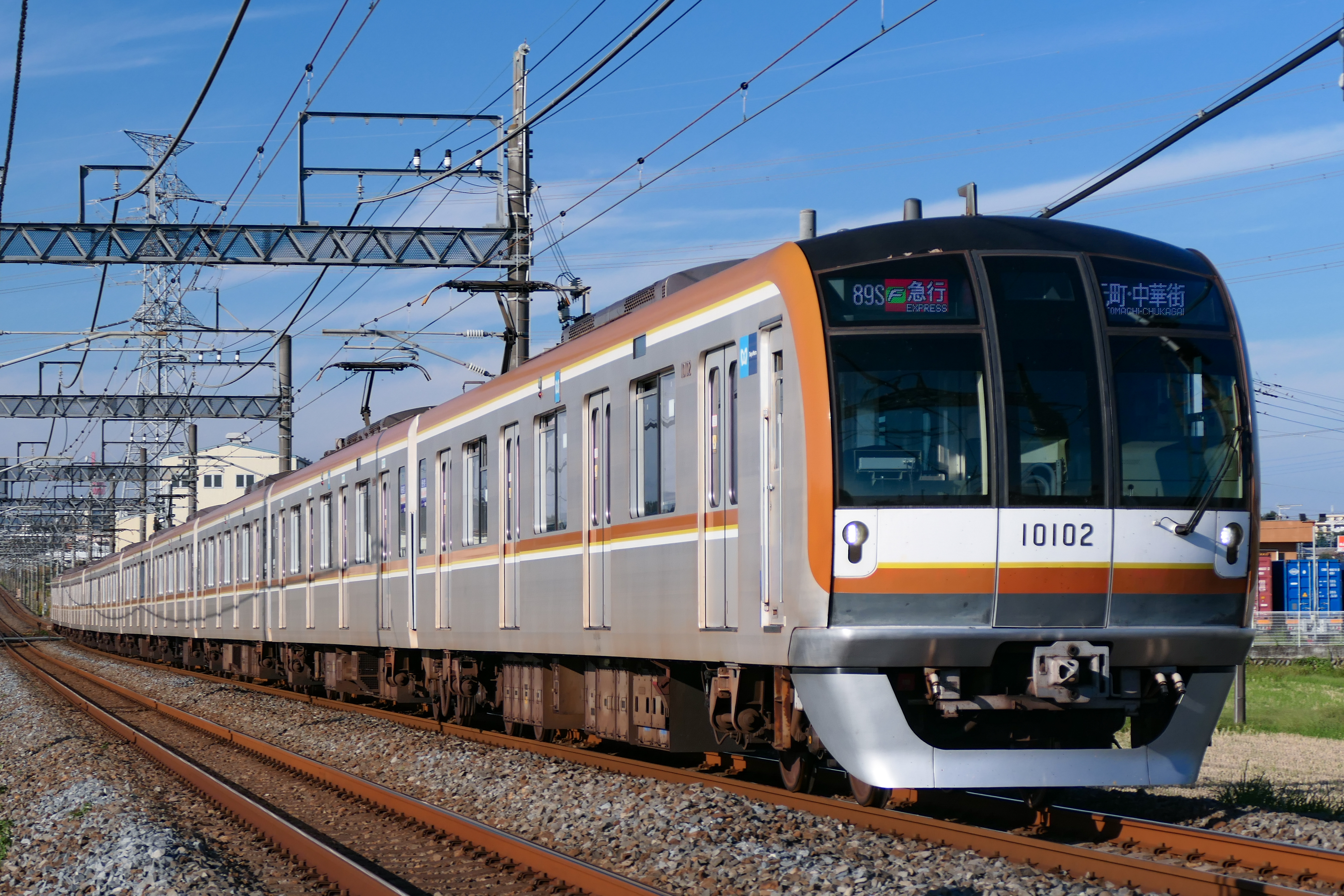
Tokyo Metro 10000 series

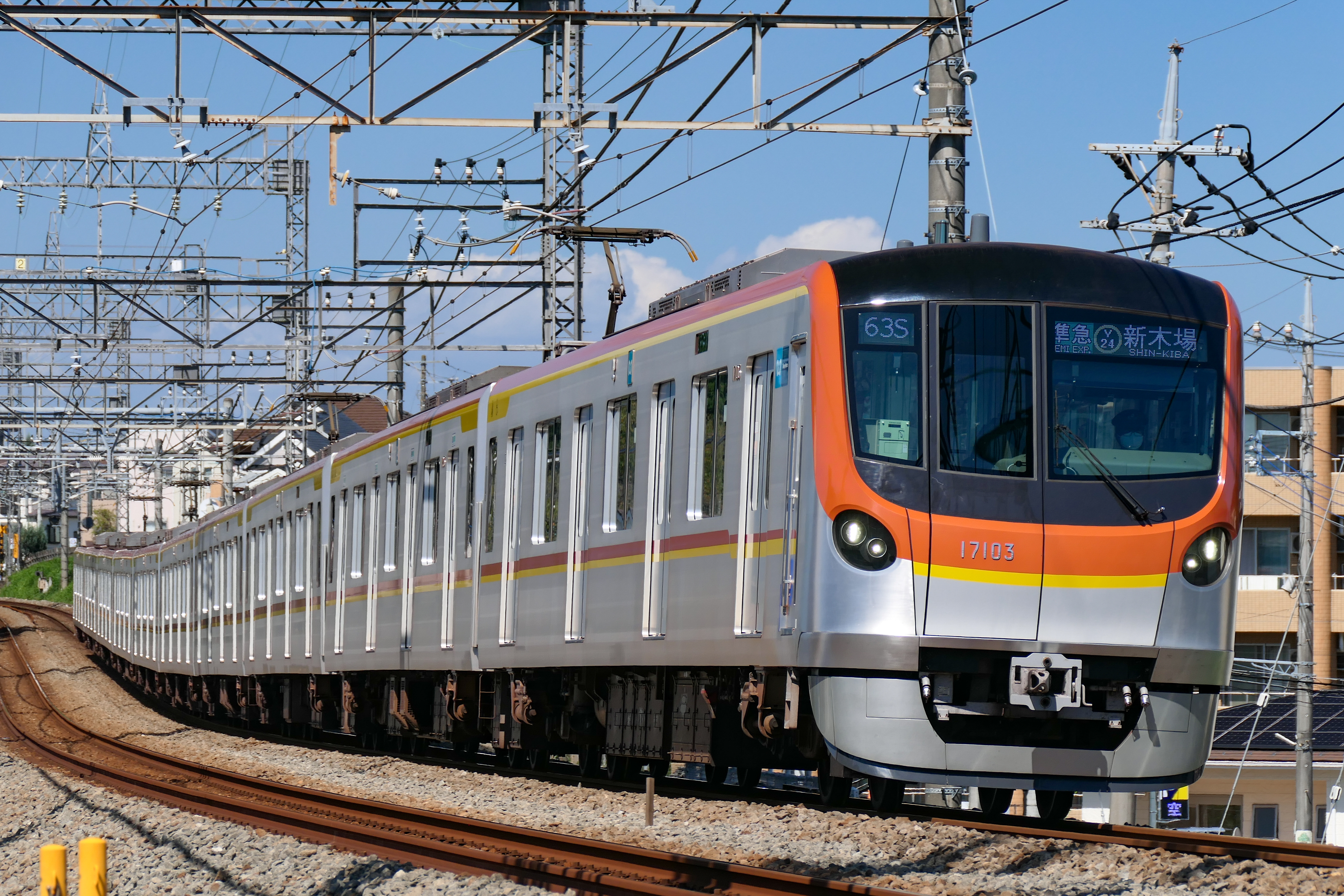
Tokyo Metro 17000 series

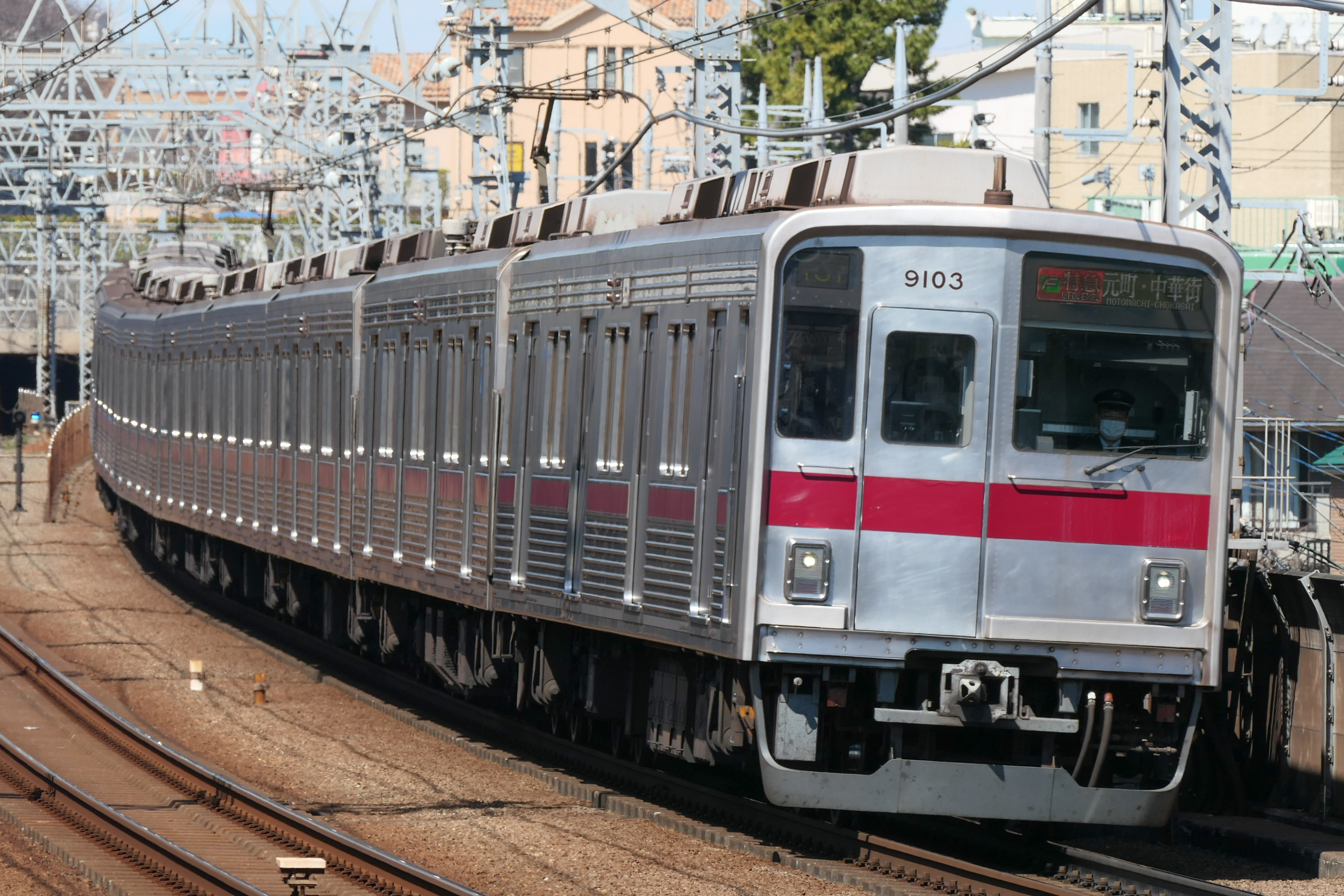
Tobu 9000 series

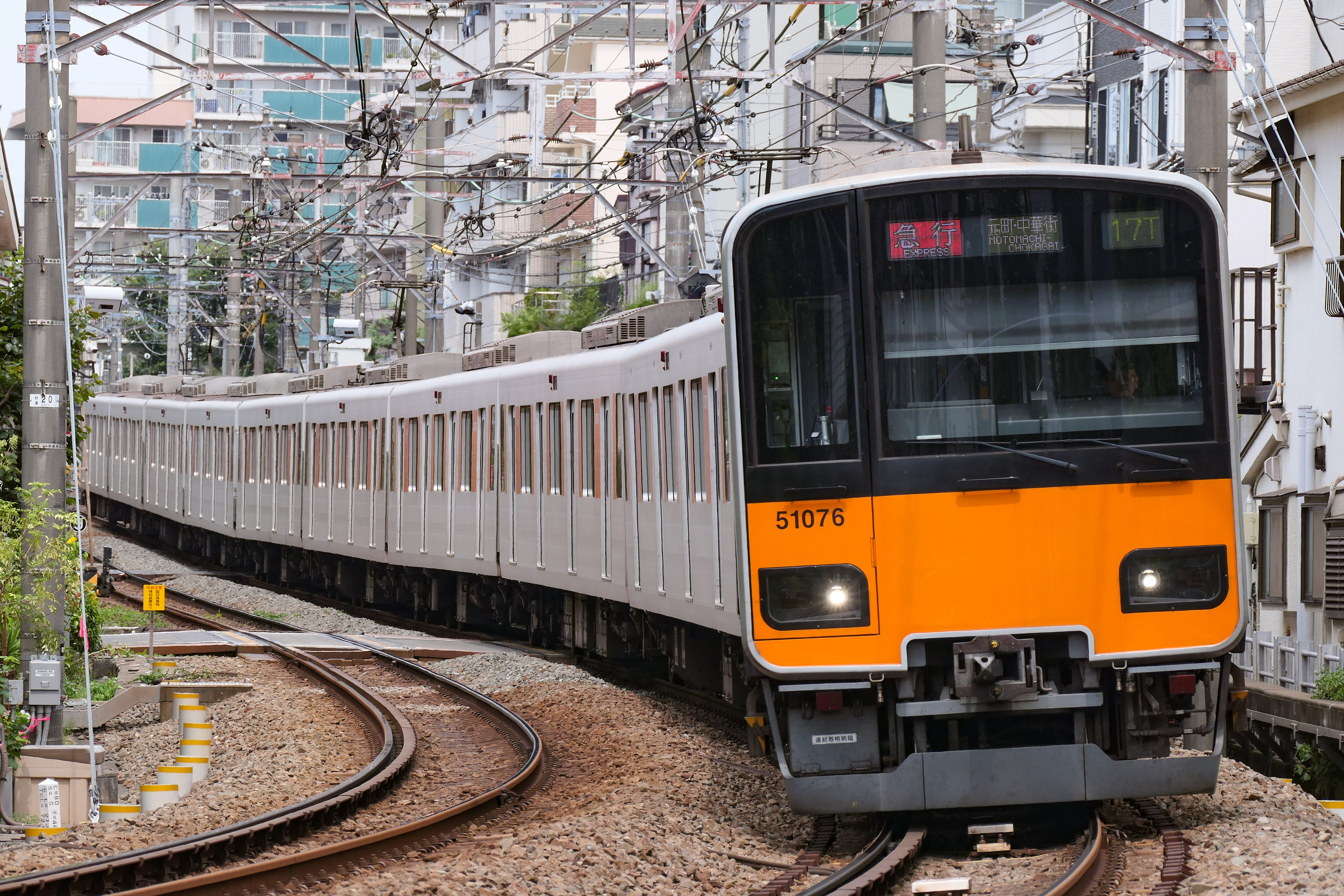
Tobu 50070 series

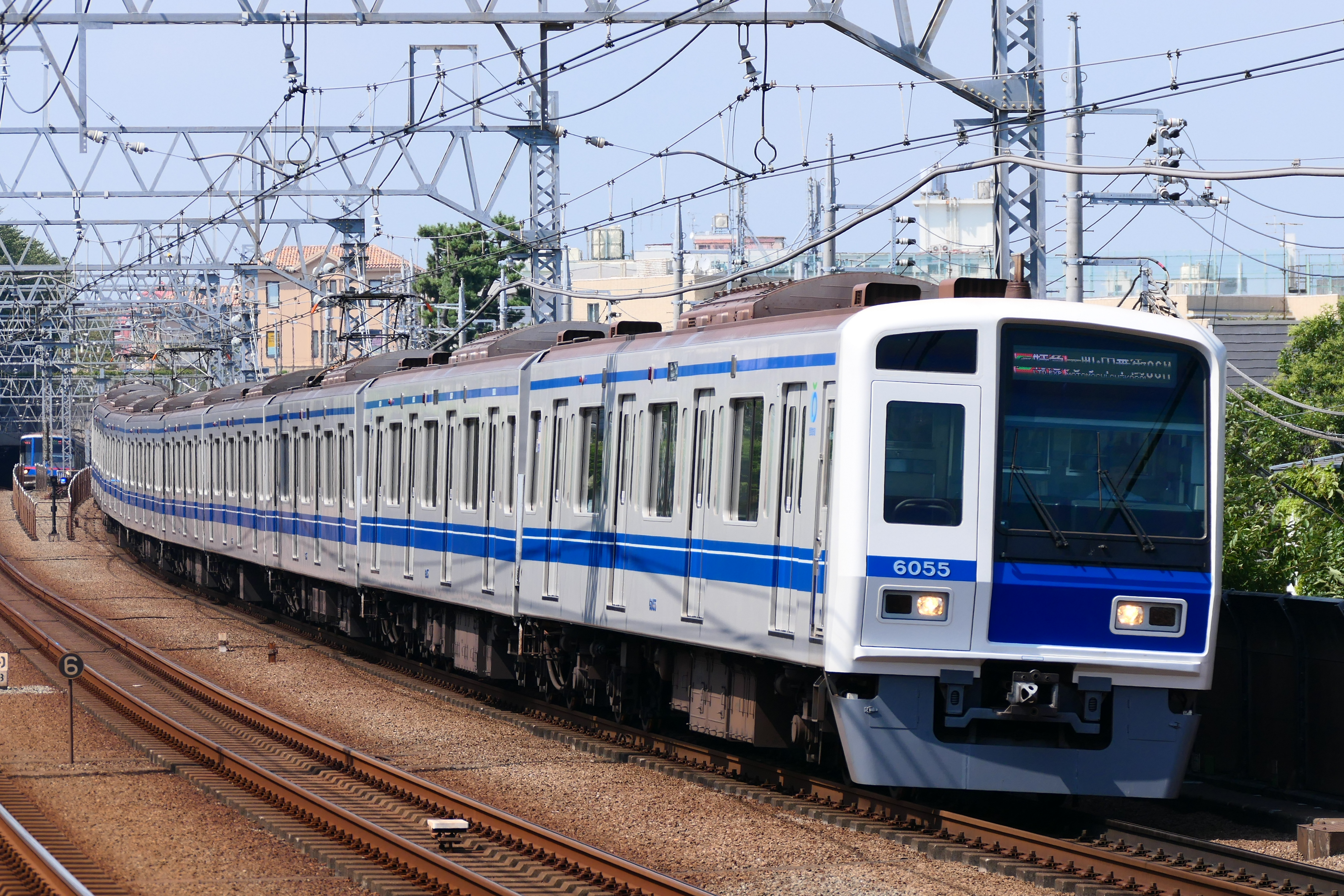
Seibu 6000 series

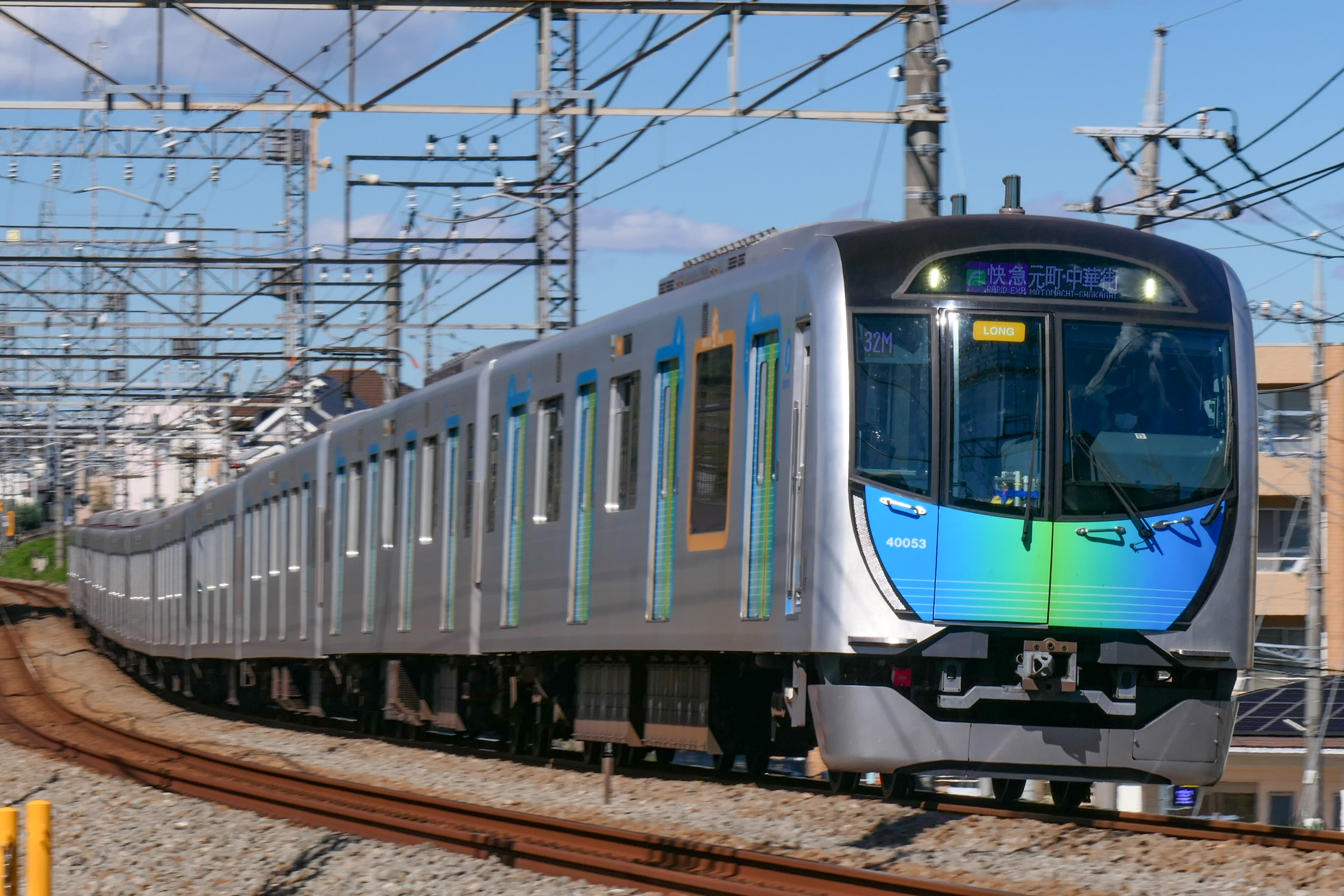
Seibu 40000 series

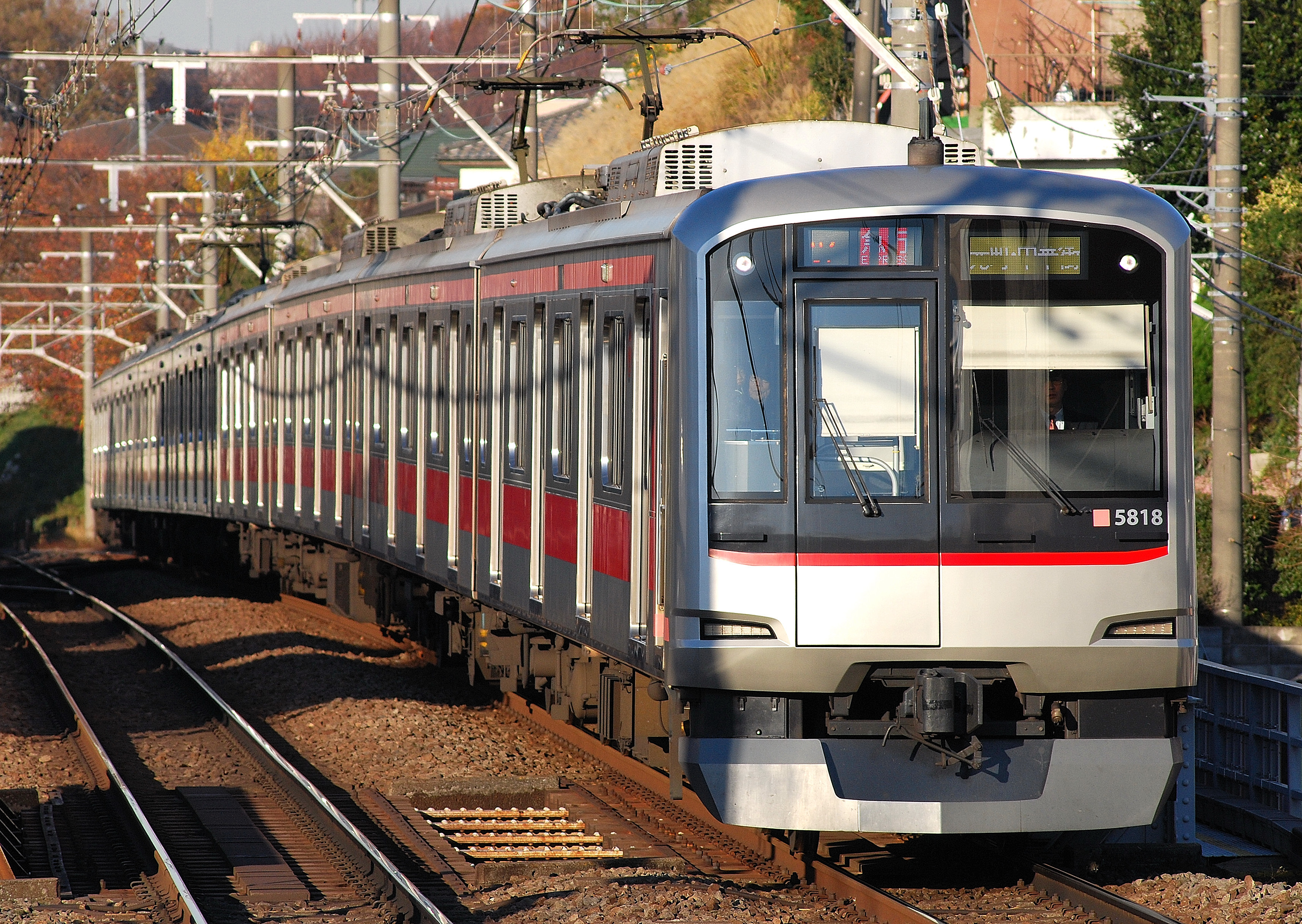
Tokyu 5000 series (II)

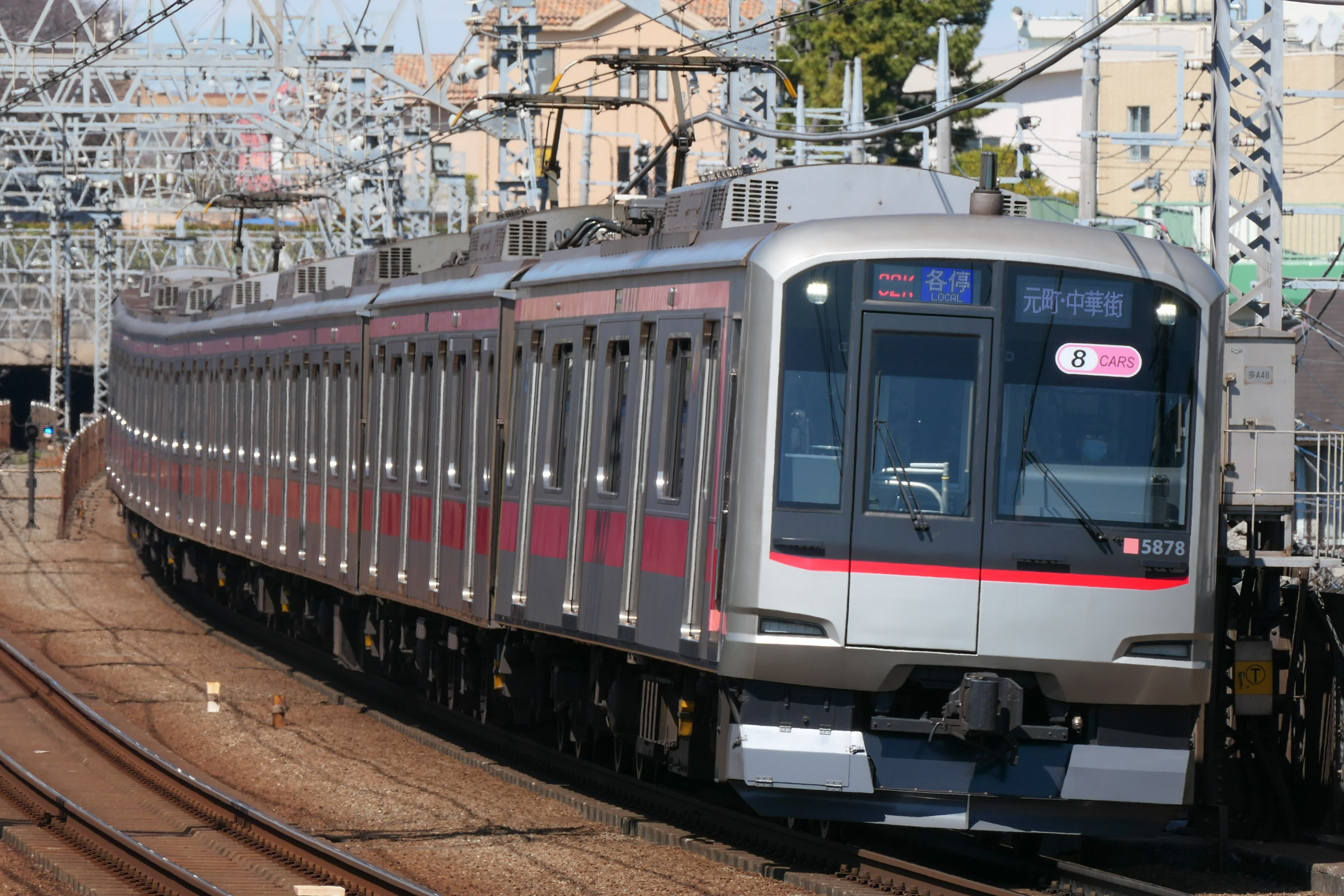
Tokyu 5050 series

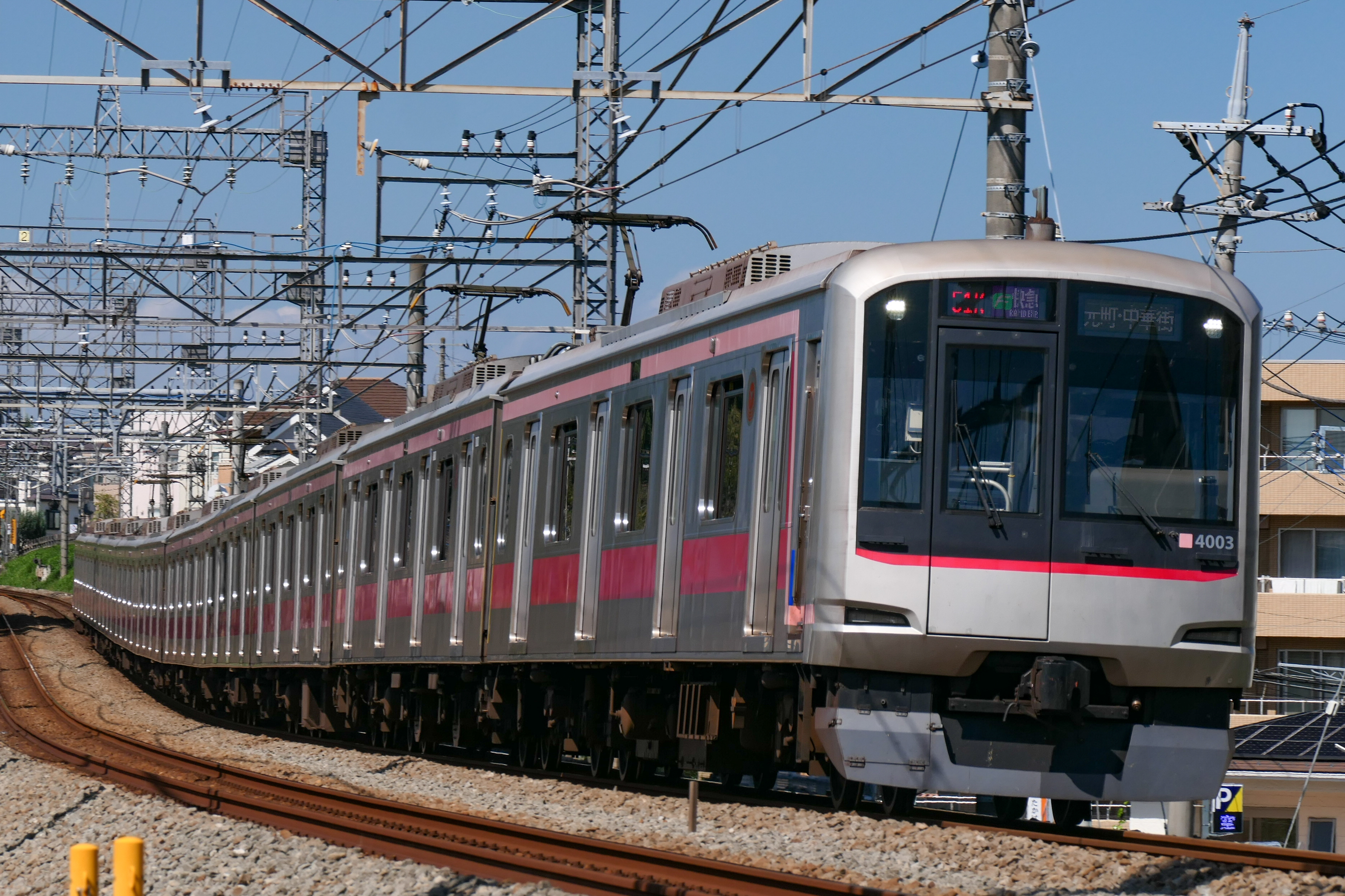
Tokyu 5050–4000 series

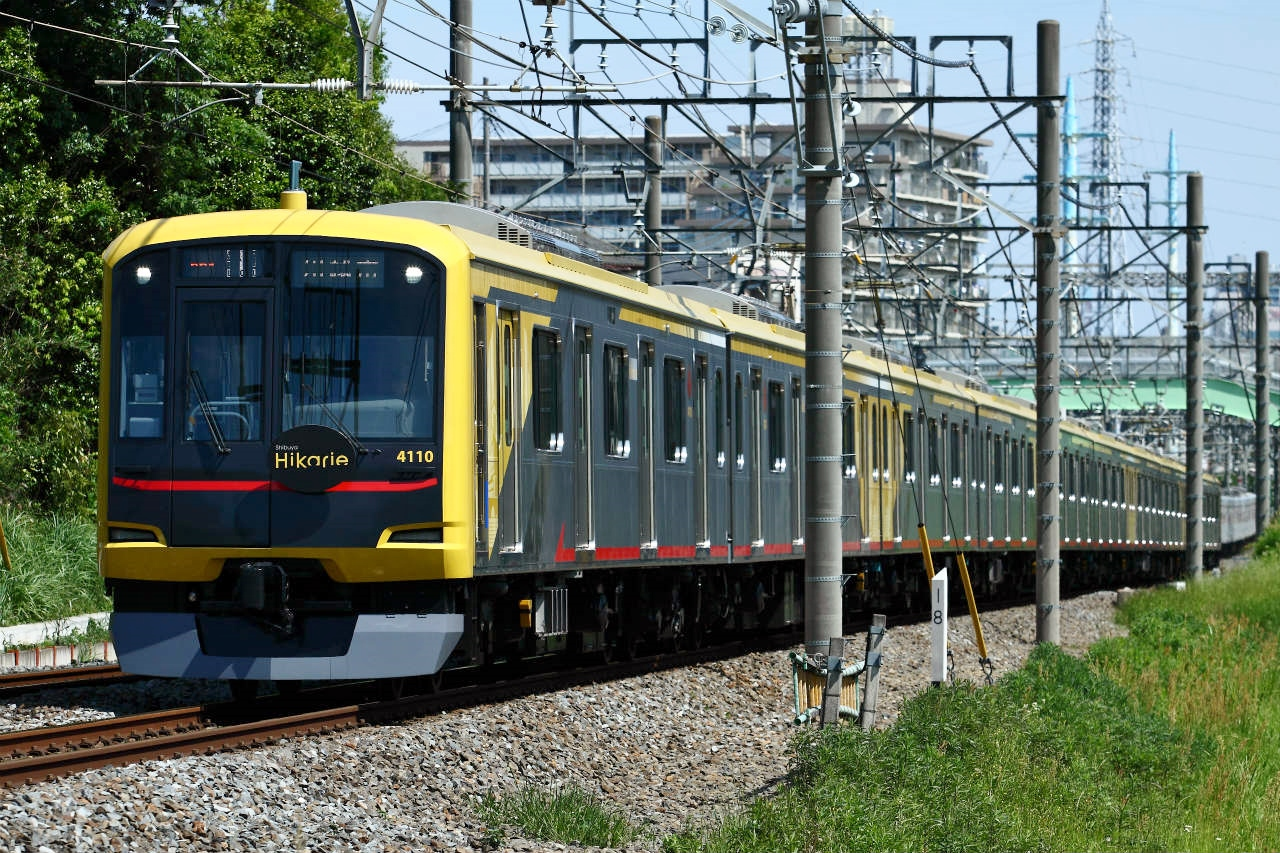
Tokyu 5050–4000 series (Shibuya Hikarie)

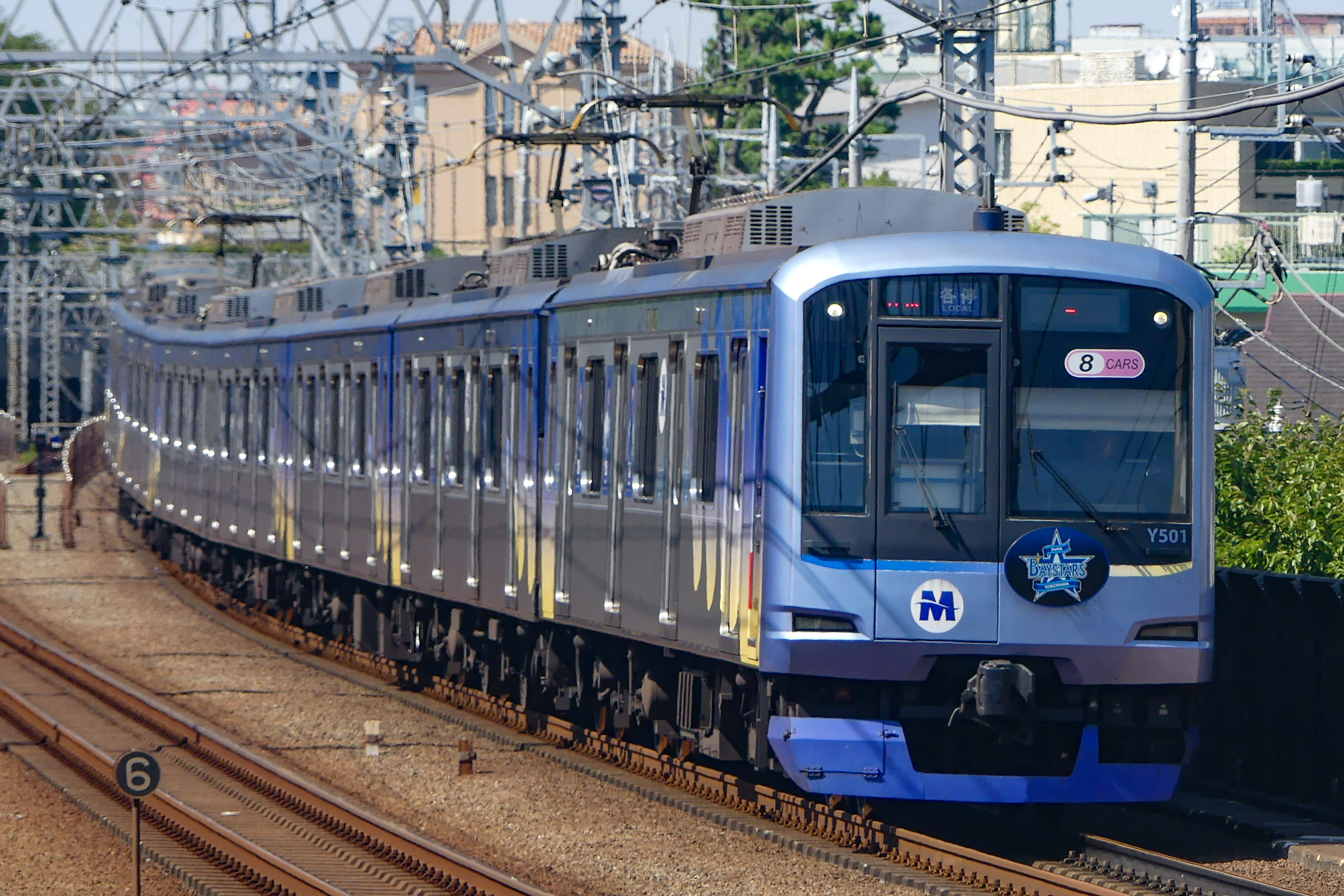
Yokohama Minatomirai Railway Y500 series

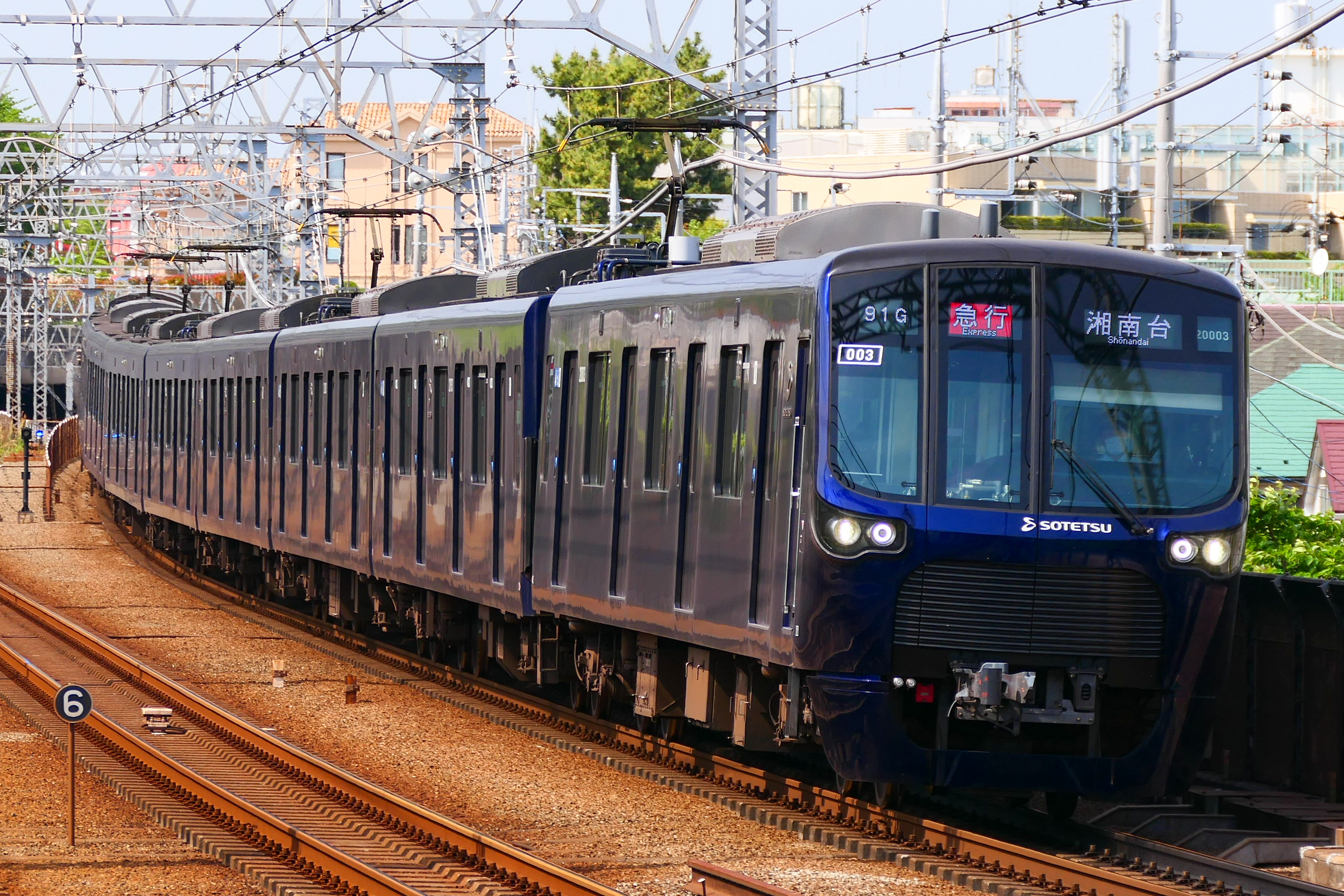
Sotetsu 20000 series

=== Former ===
TRTA/Tokyo Metro

- Tokyo Metro 07 series (10-car sets) (from 1993 until 2007, transferred to Tōzai Line)
- Tokyo Metro 7000 series (8/10-car sets) (from 1974 until April 2022)

Odakyu Electric Railway (Yūrakuchō Line only)

- Odakyu 60000 series MSE (4/6-car sets) (used for Bay Resort Romancecar services)
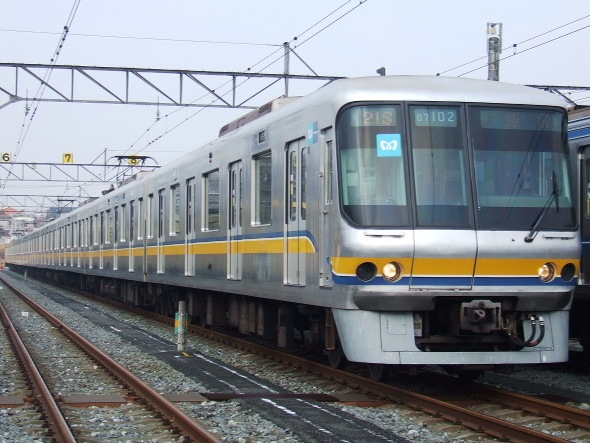
Tokyo Metro 07 series

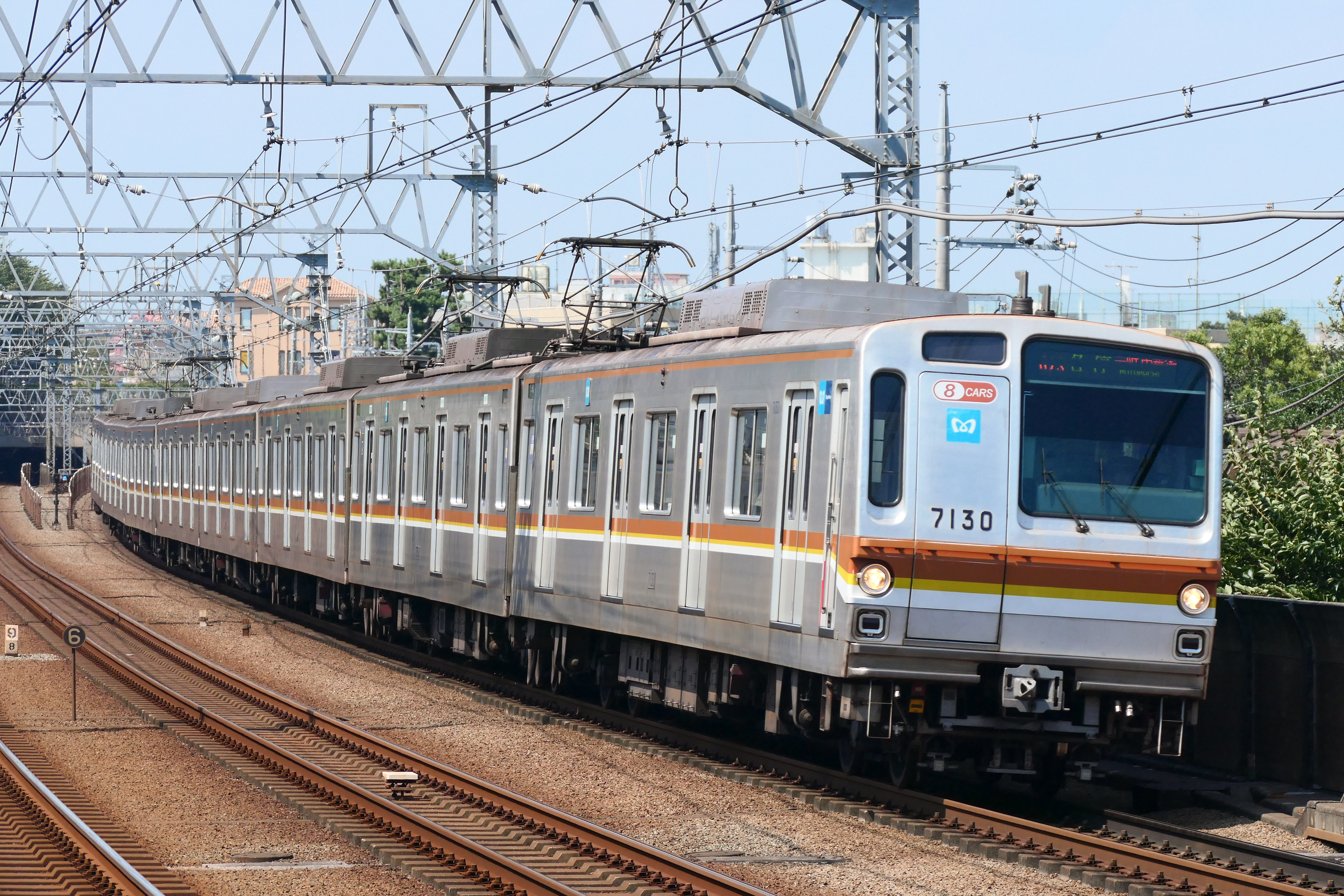
Tokyo Metro 7000 series

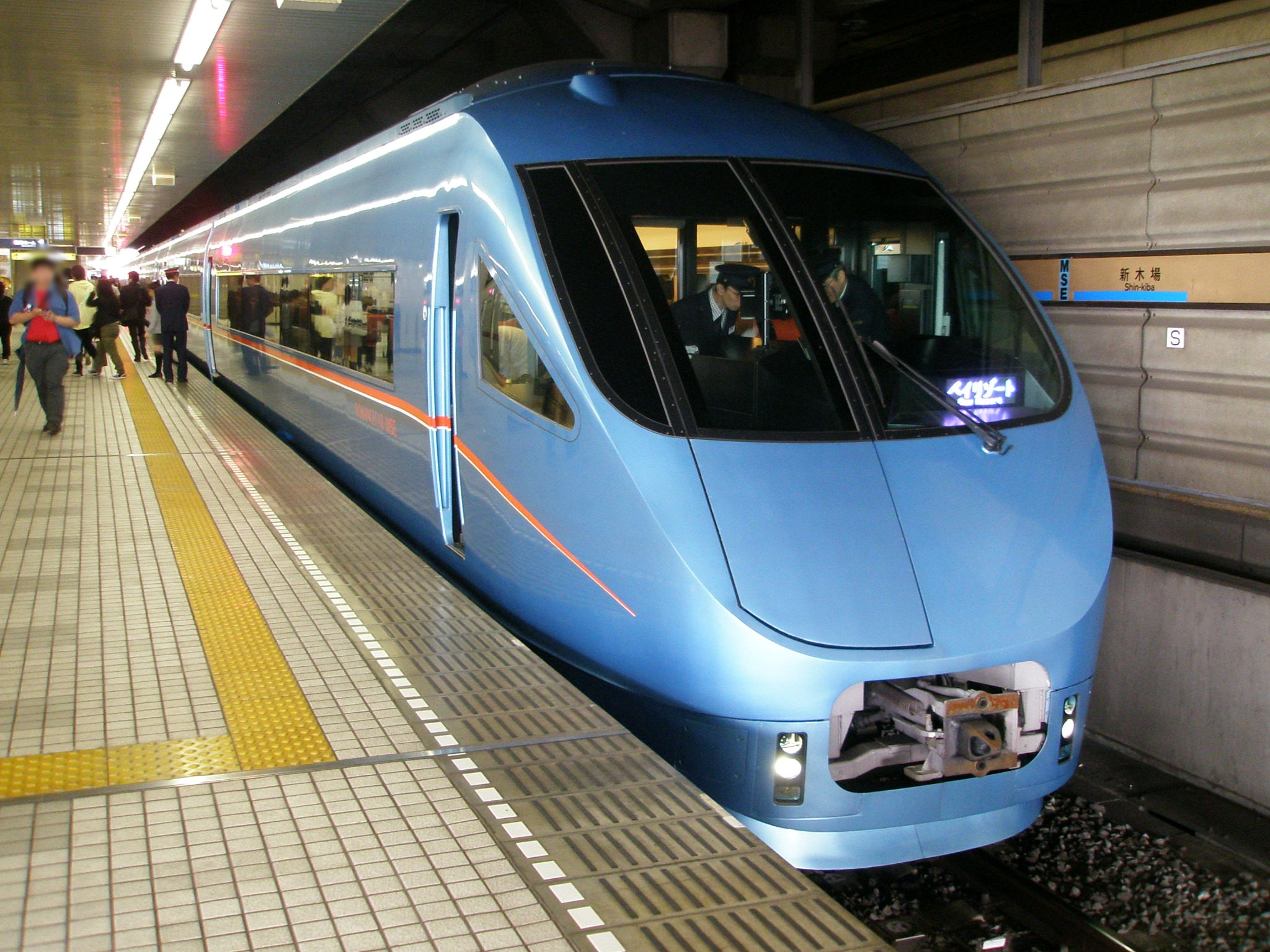
Odakyu 60000 series

== Hanzōmon Line ==
Hanzōmon Line trains are 20-meter-long 10-car formations, with four doors per side and longitudinal seating.

=== Present ===
Tokyo Metro

- Tokyo Metro 8000 series (since 1981)
- Tokyo Metro 08 series (since 2003)
- Tokyo Metro 18000 series (since 2021)

Tokyu Corporation

- Tokyu 5000 series (II) (since 2002)
- Tokyu 2020 series (since 2018)

Tobu Railway

- Tobu 50050 series (since 2006)
- Tobu 50000 series (since September 2020)
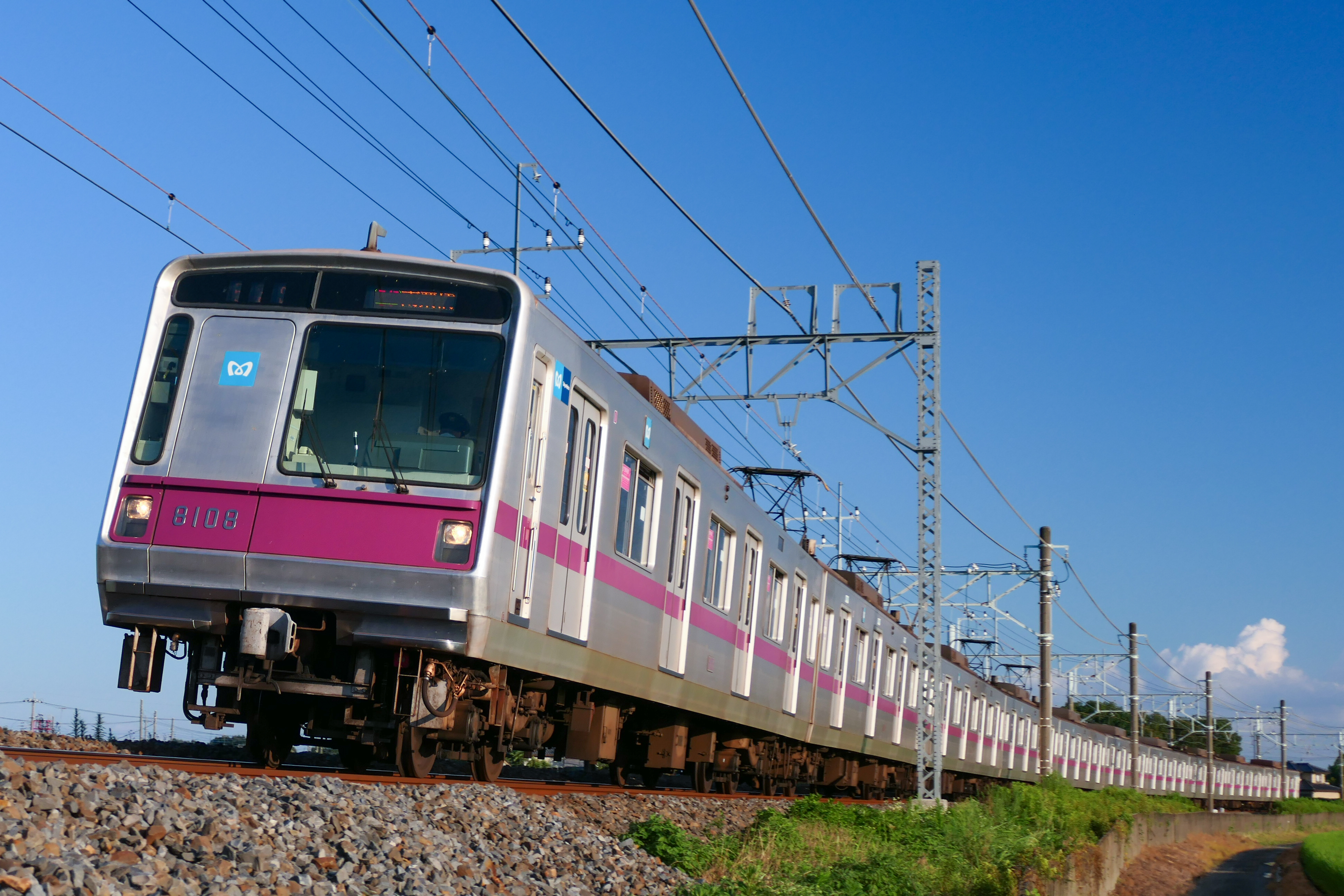
Tokyo Metro 8000 series

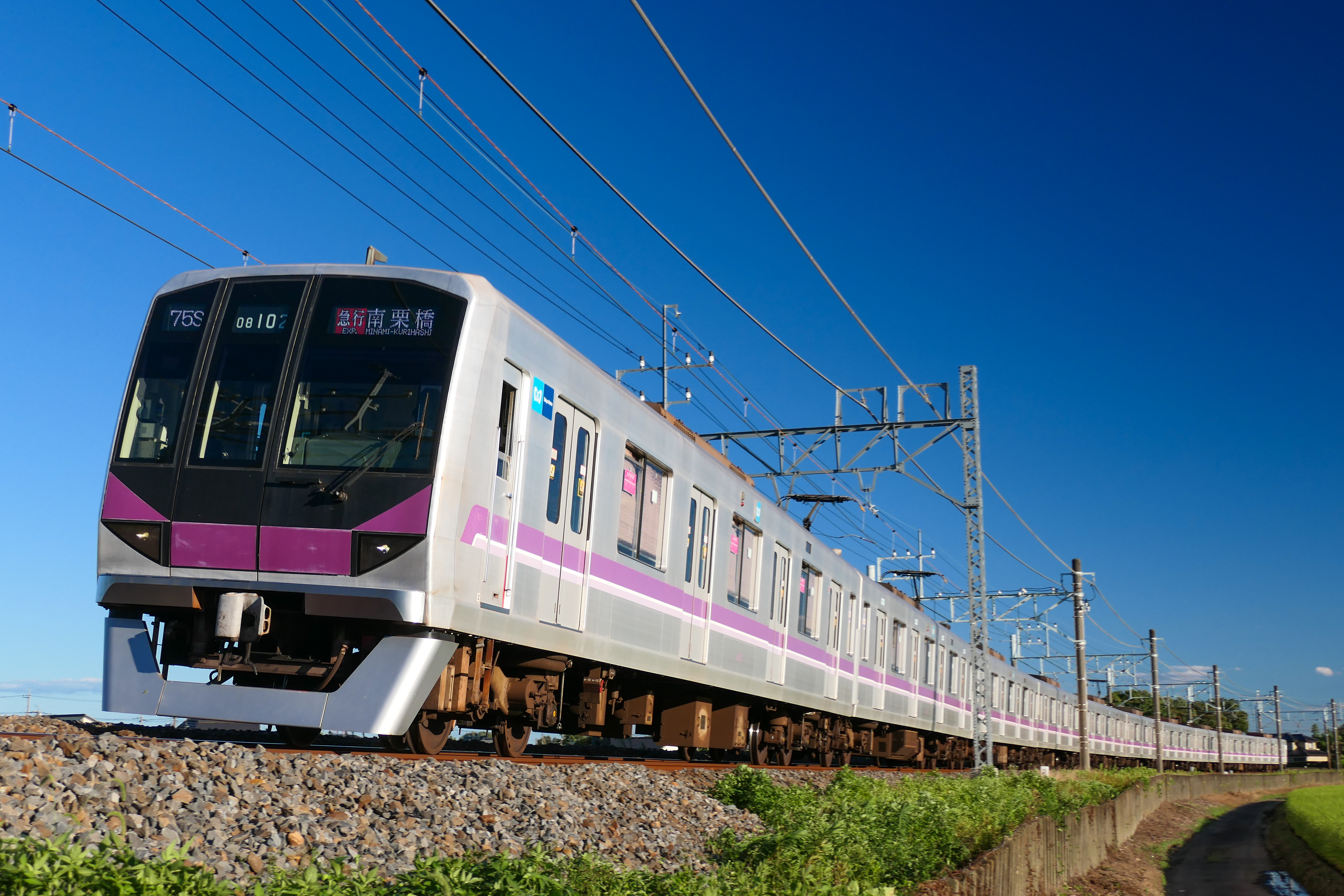
Tokyo Metro 08 series

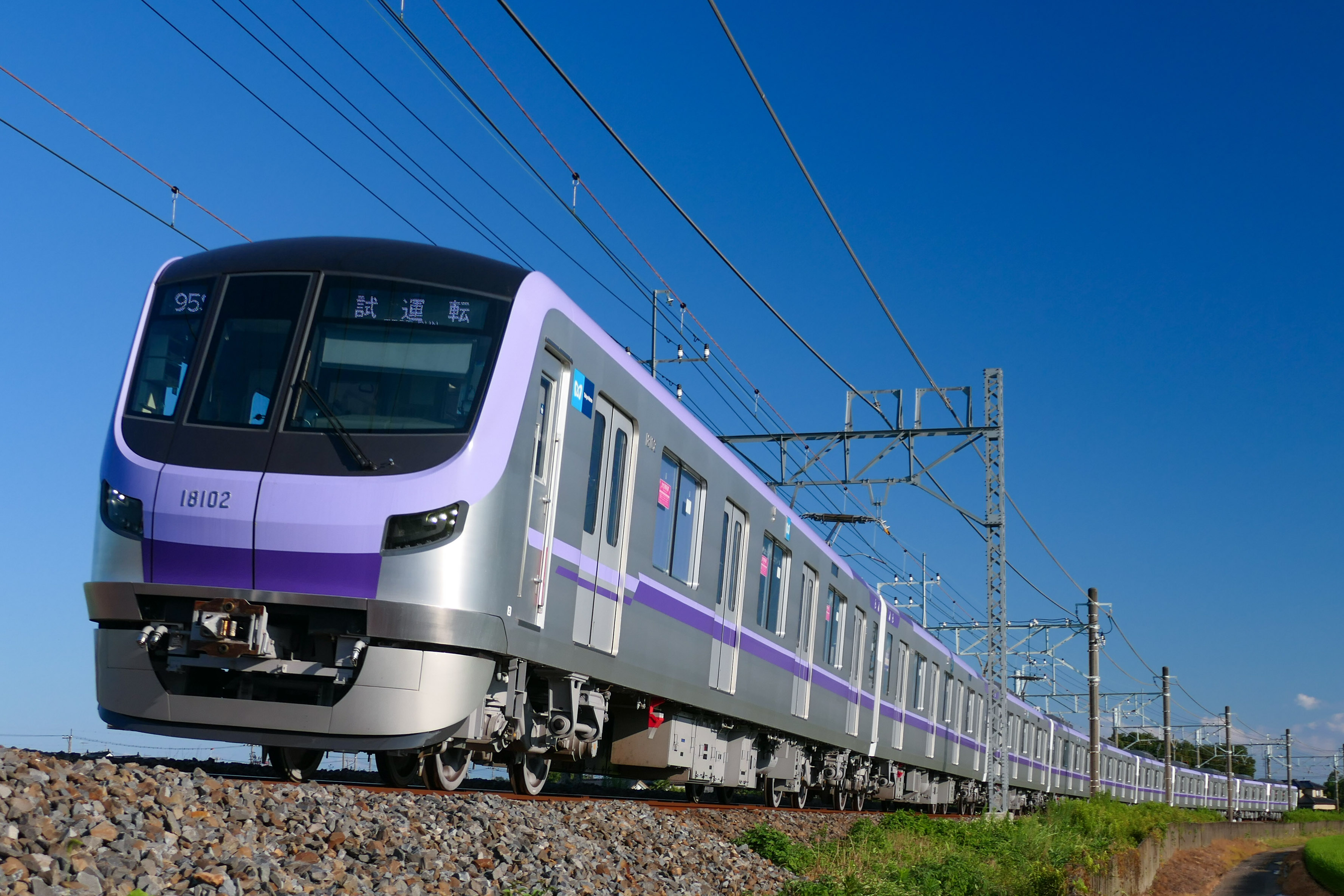
Tokyo Metro 18000 series

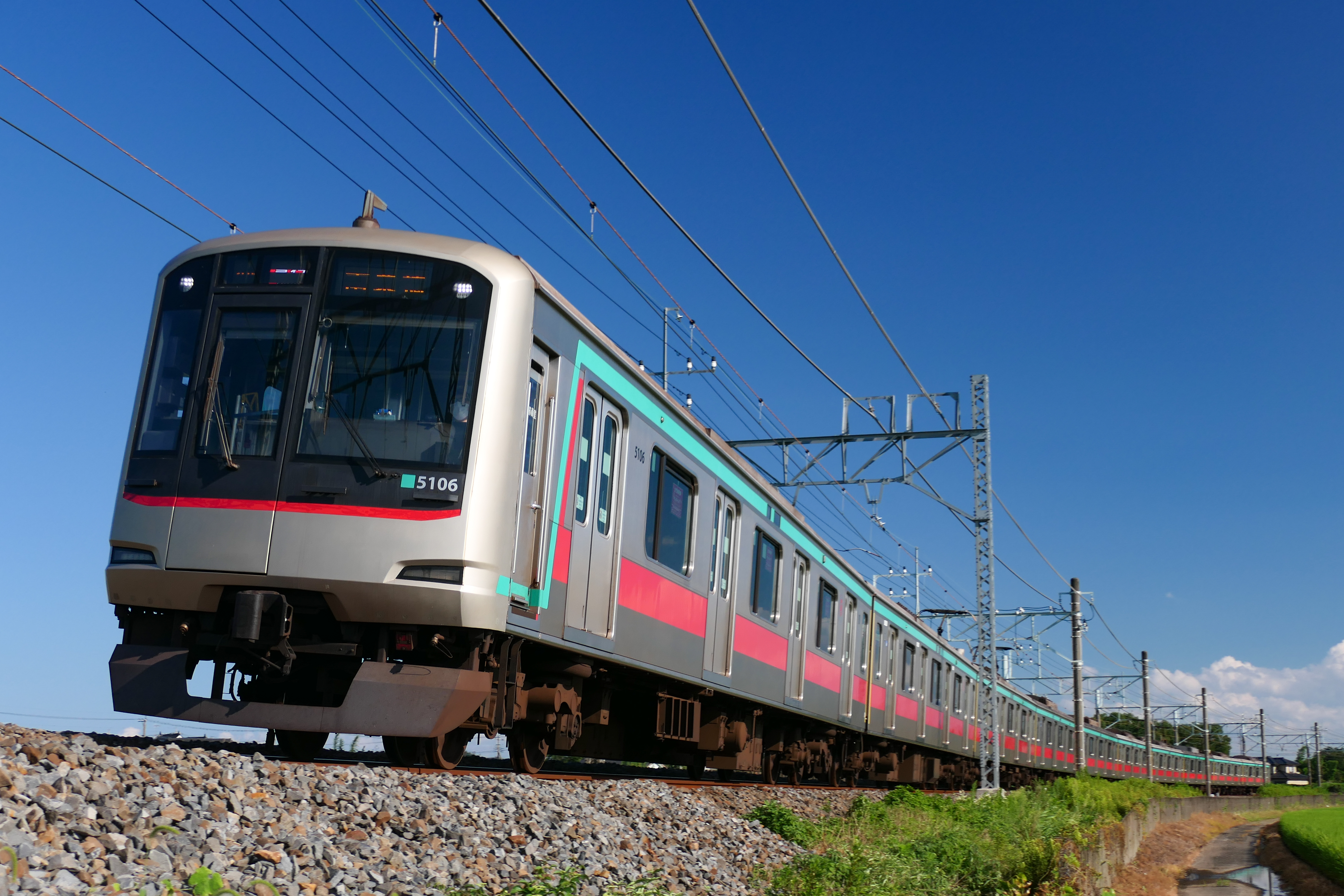
Tokyu 5000 series (II)

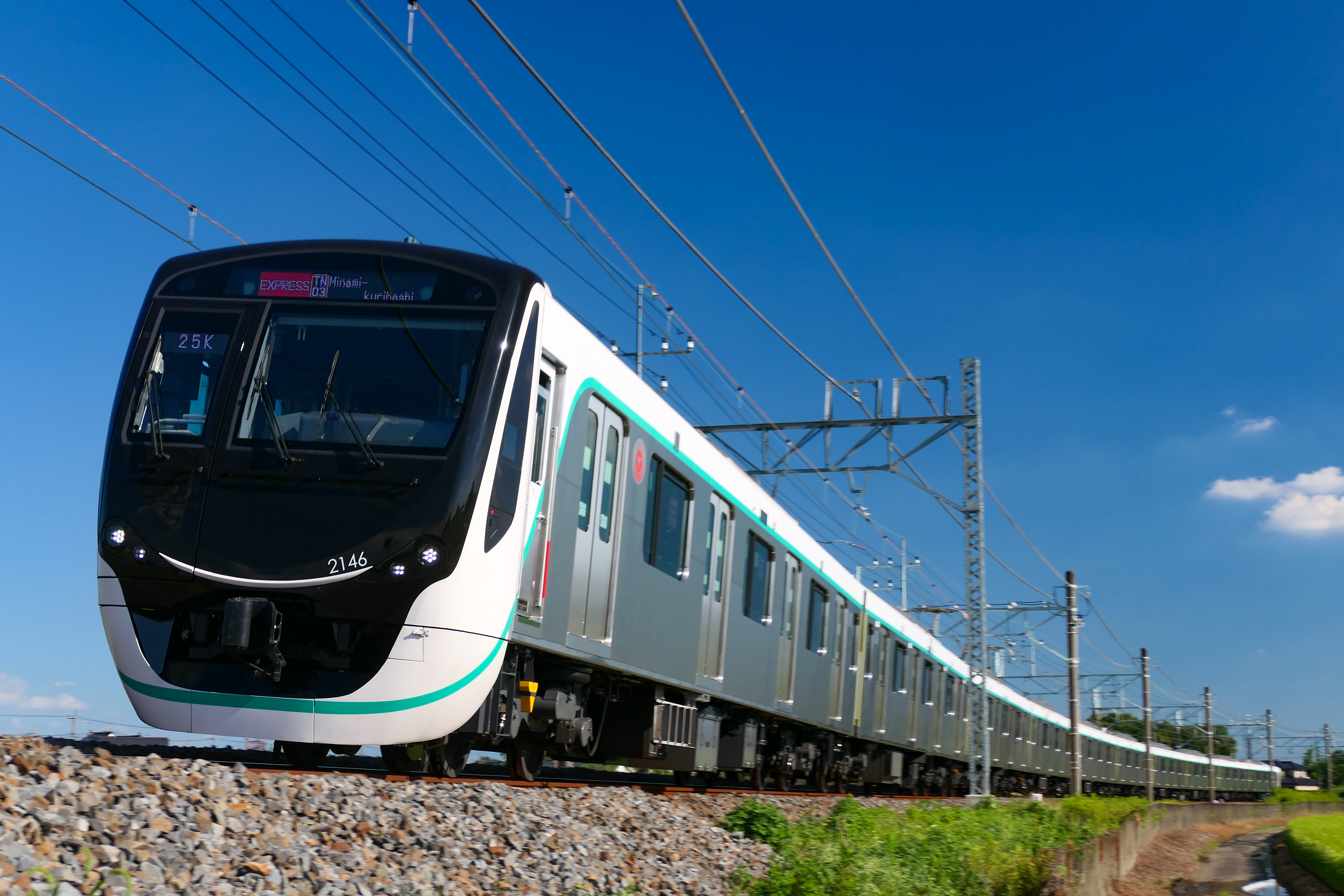
Tokyu 2020 series

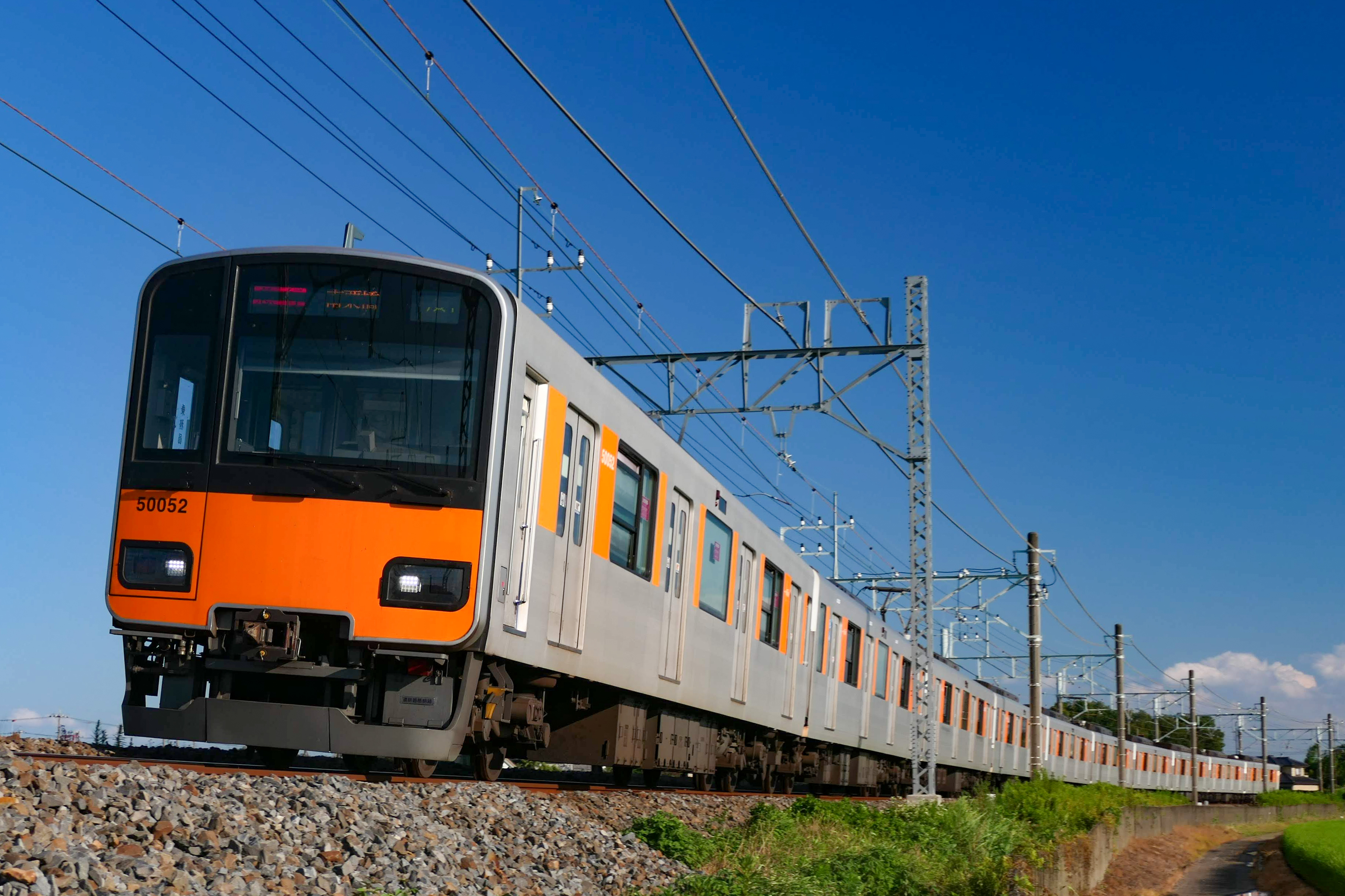
Tobu 50050 series

=== Former ===
Tokyu Corporation

- Tokyu 2000 series (from 1992 until 2018)
- Tokyu 8500 series (from 1978 until January 2023)
- Tokyu 8590 series (from 1988 until 2019)

Tobu Railway

- Tobu 30000 series (from 2003 until June 2021)
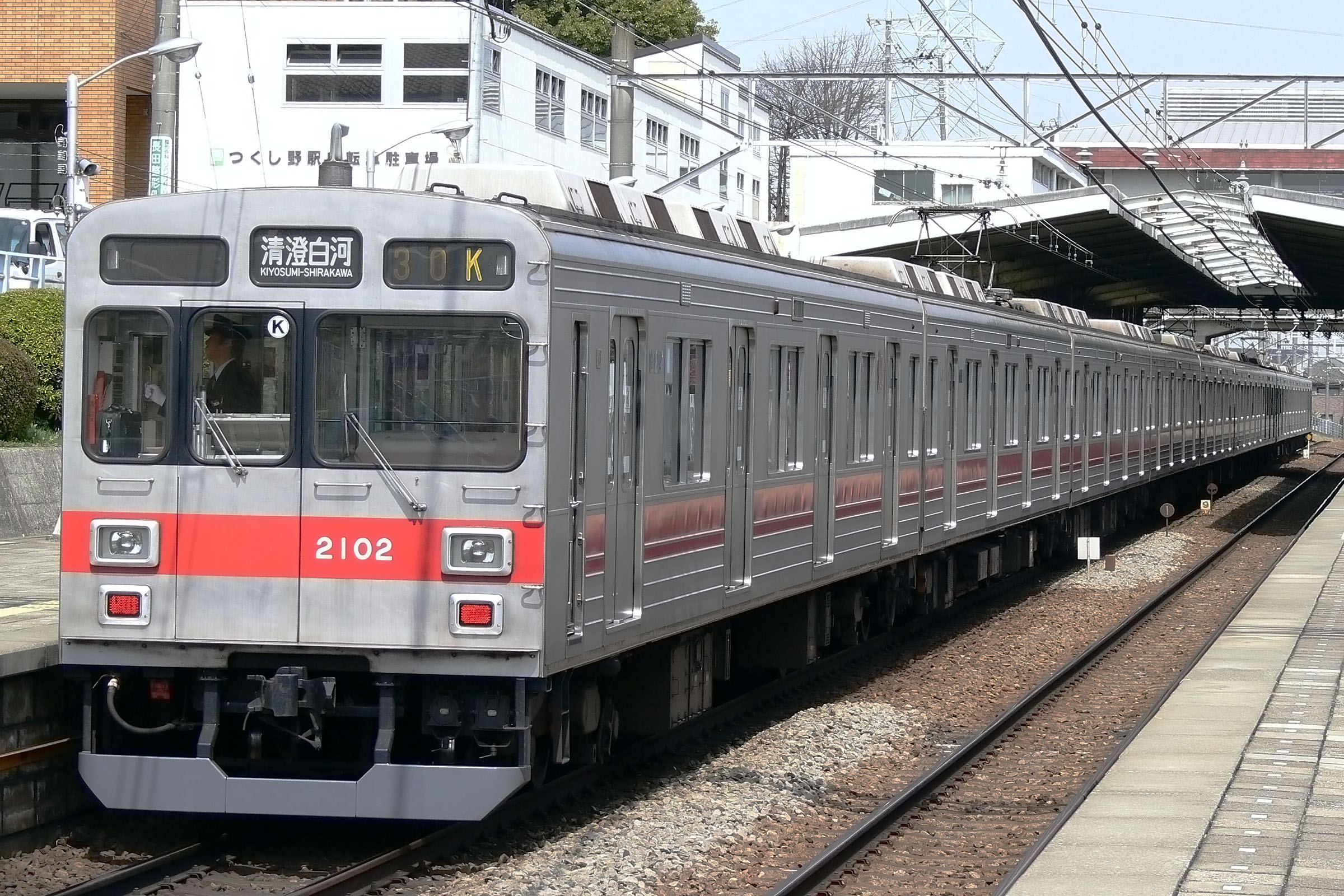
Tokyu 2000 series

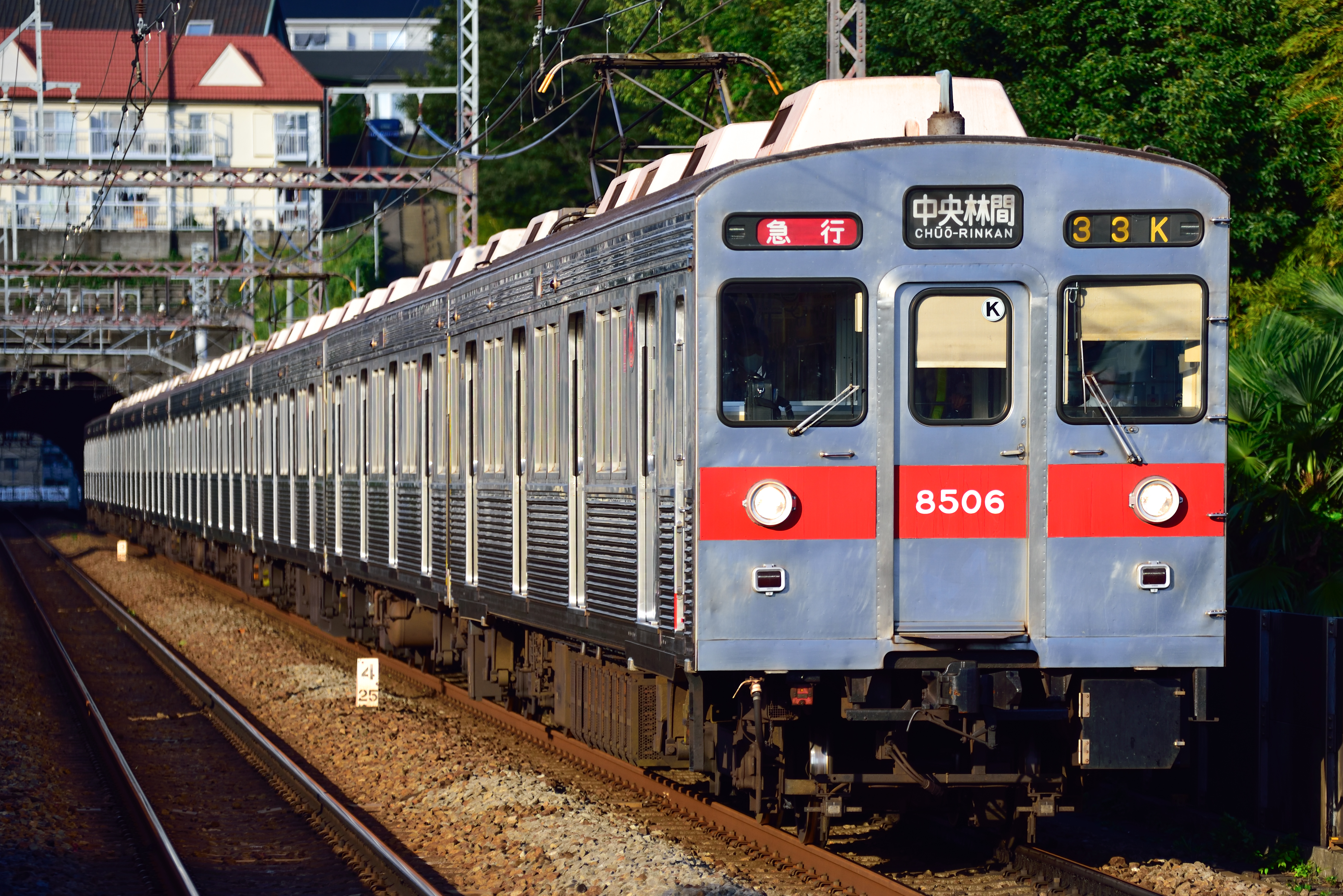
Tokyu 8500 series

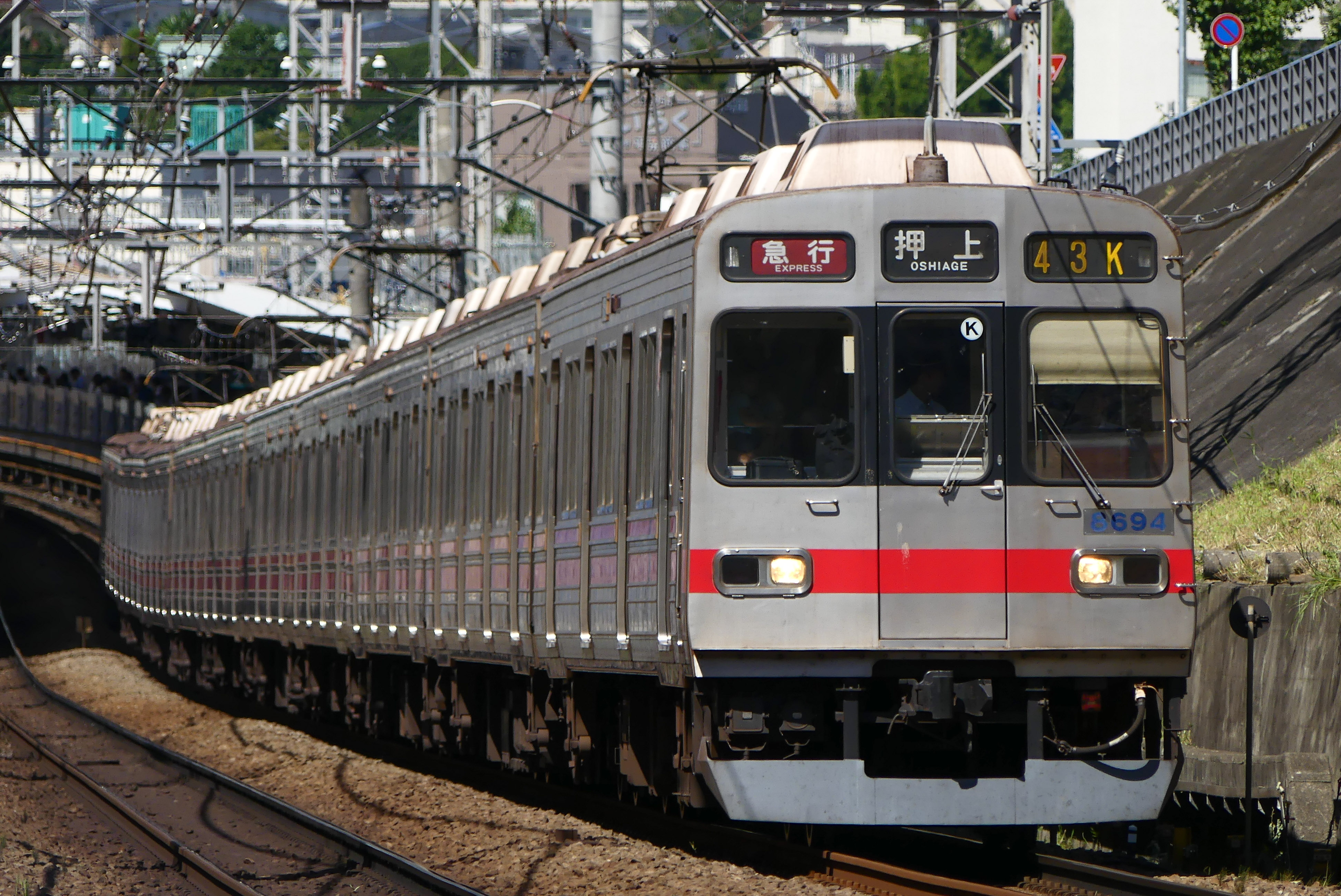
Tokyu 8590 series

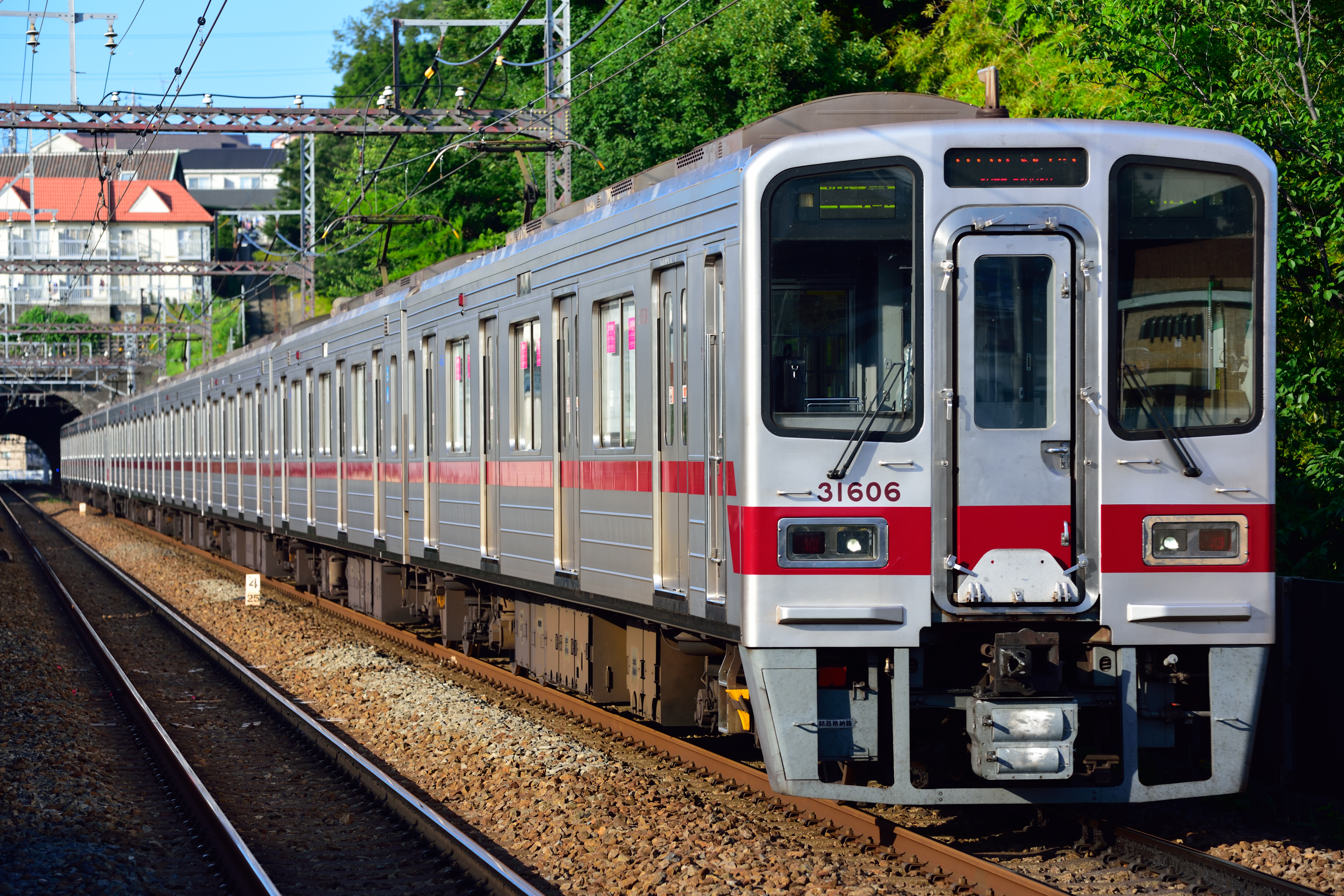
Tobu 30000 series

== Namboku Line ==
Namboku Line trains are 20-meter-long 6-car/8-car formations, with four doors per side.

=== Present ===
Tokyo Metro

- Tokyo Metro 9000 series (6/8-car sets) (since 1991)

Saitama Rapid Railway

- Saitama Rapid Railway 2000 series (6-car sets) (since 2001)

Tokyu Corporation

- Tokyu 3000 series (II) (8-car sets) (since 2000)
- Tokyu 5080 series (8-car sets) (since 2003)
- Tokyu 3020 series (8-car sets) (since 5 January 2020)

Sagami Railway (Sotetsu)

- Sotetsu 21000 series (8-car sets) (since 18 March 2023)
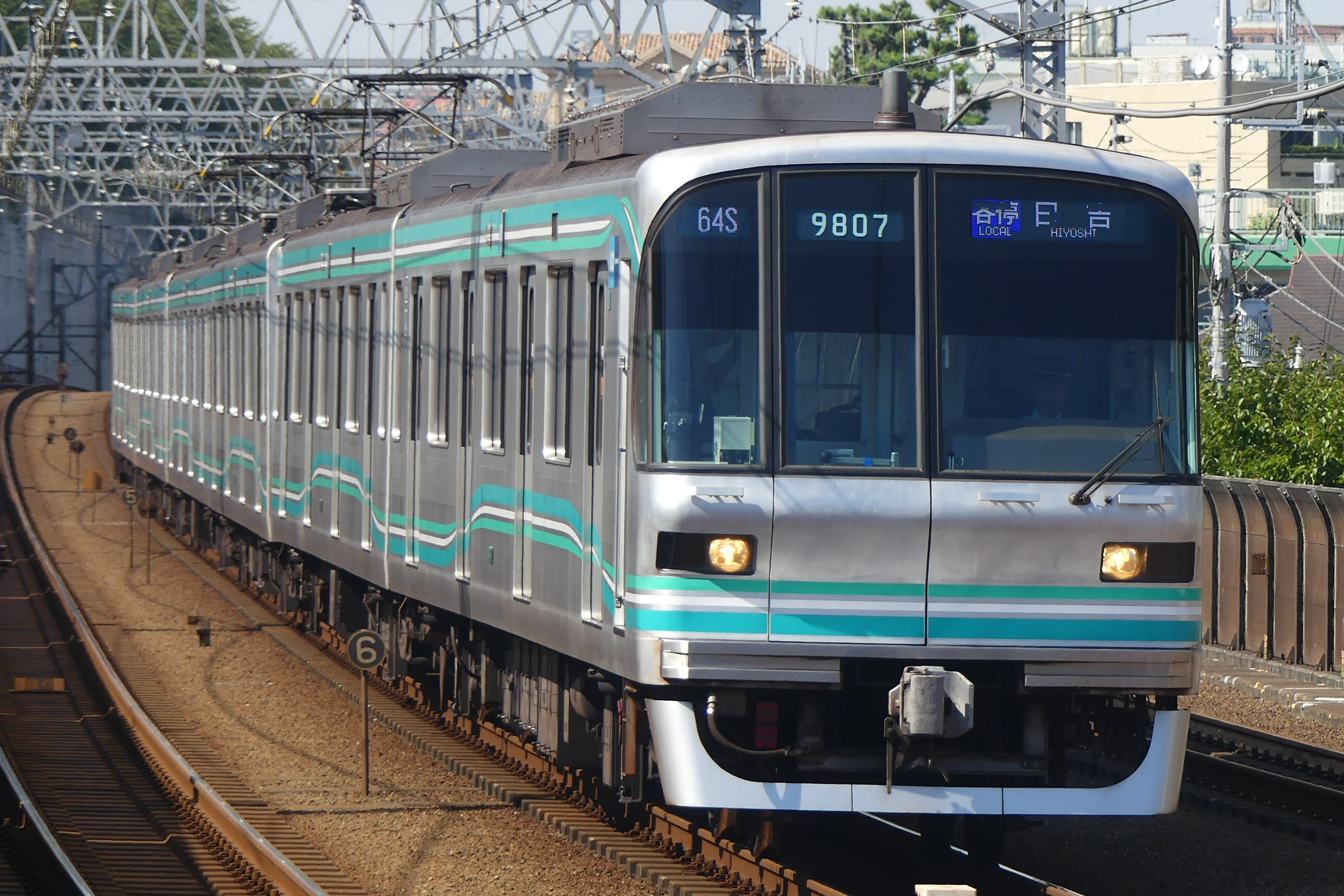
Tokyo Metro 9000 series

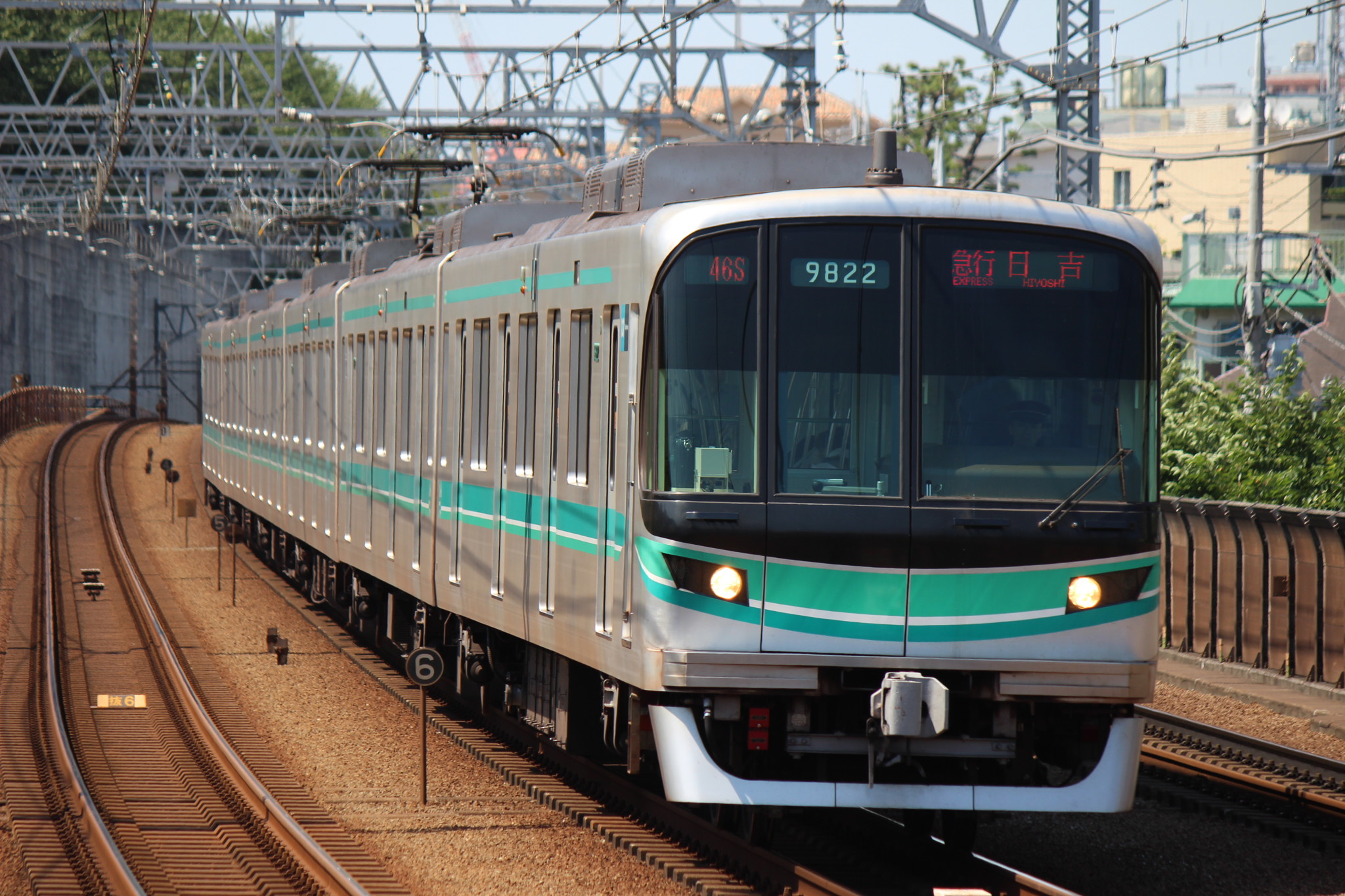
Tokyo Metro 9000 series (5th batch)

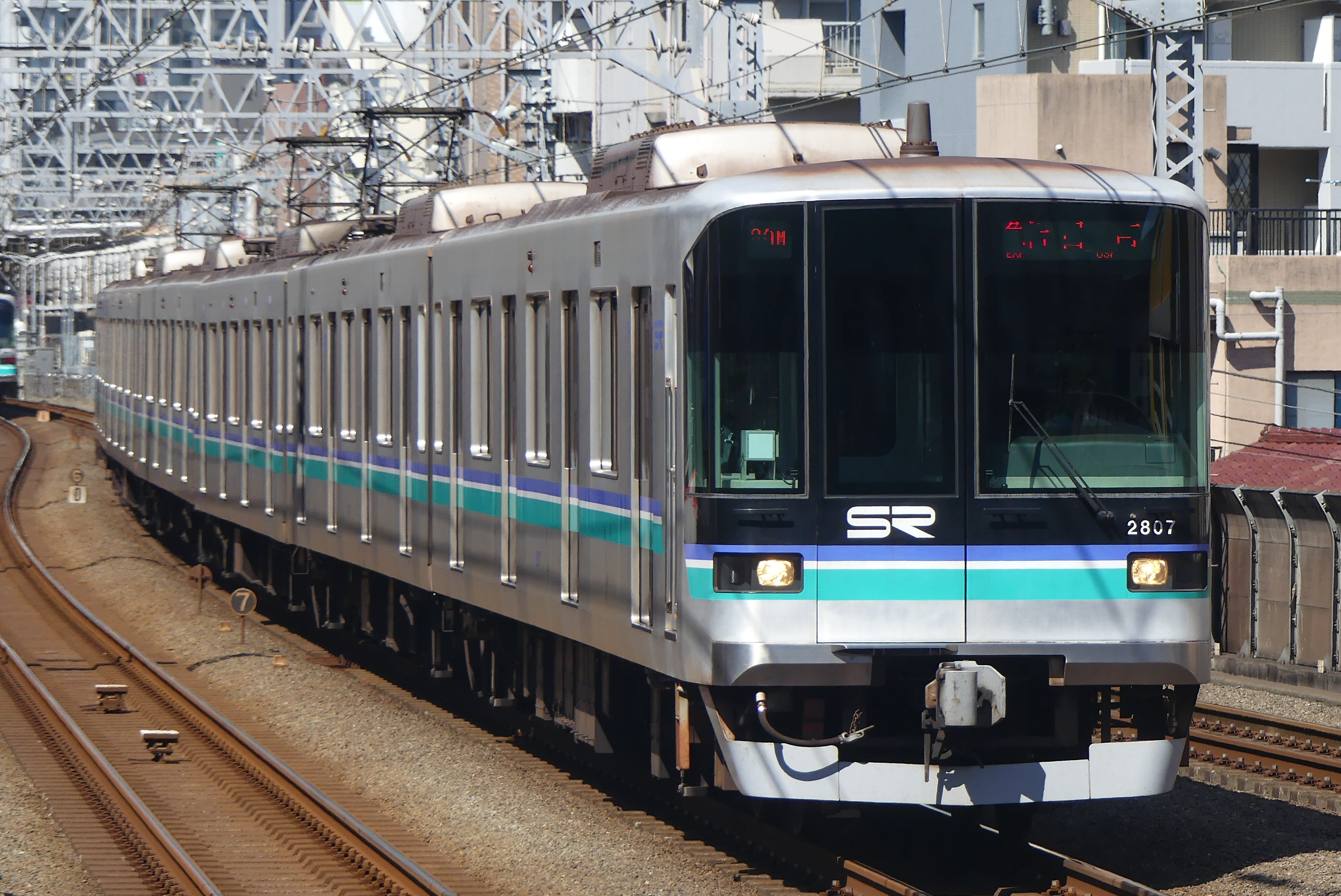
Saitama Rapid Railway 2000 series

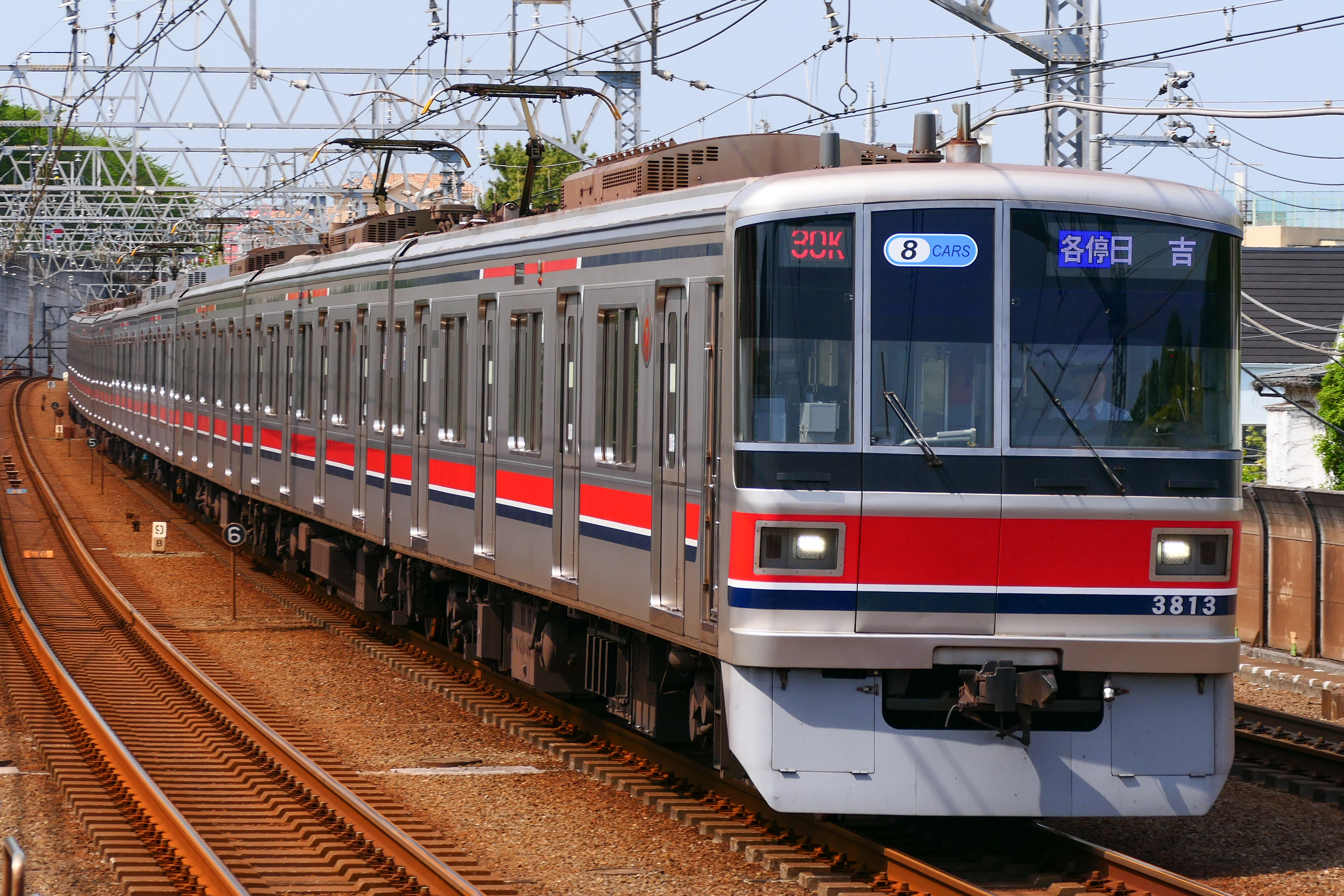
Tokyu 3000 series (II)

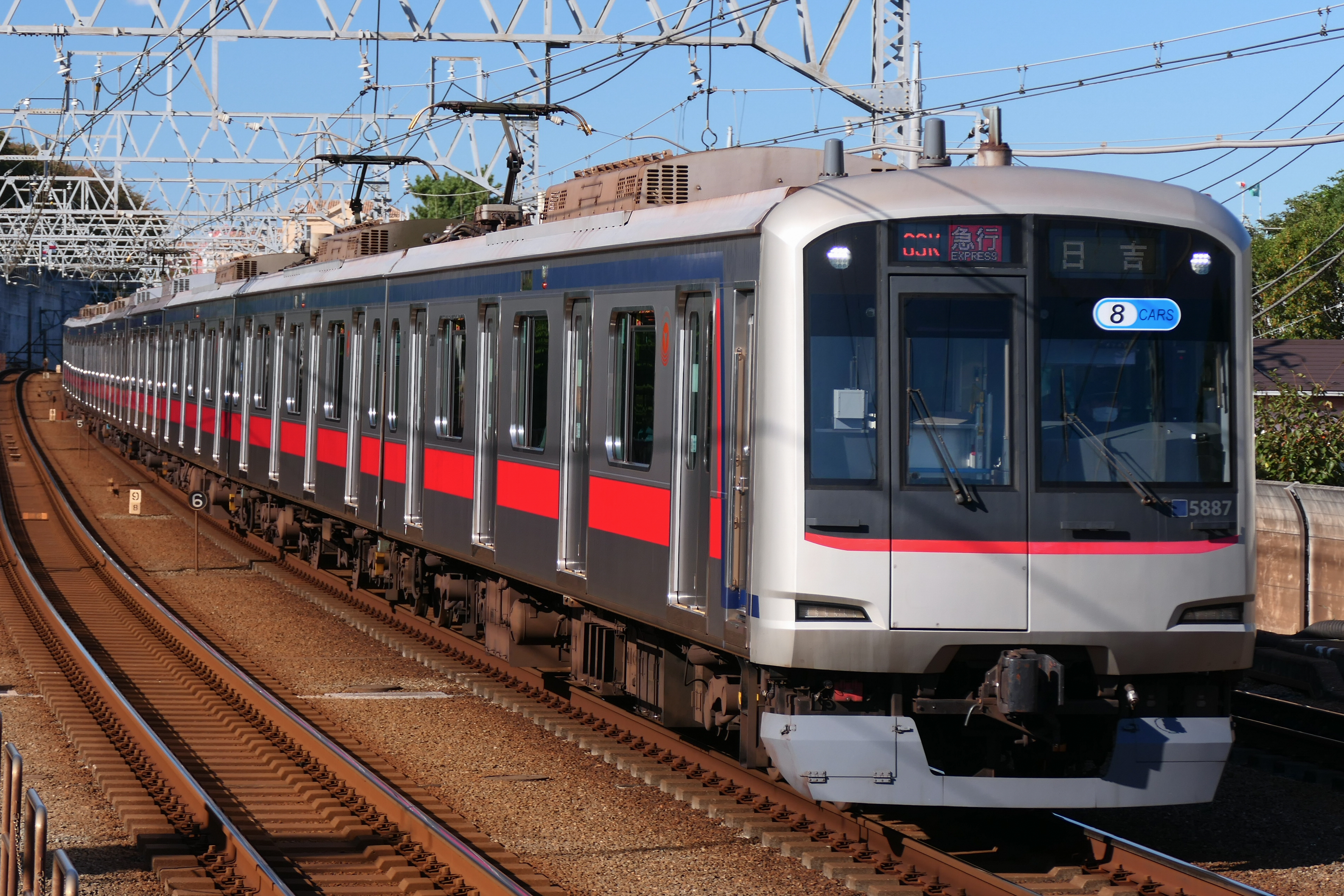
Tokyu 5080 series

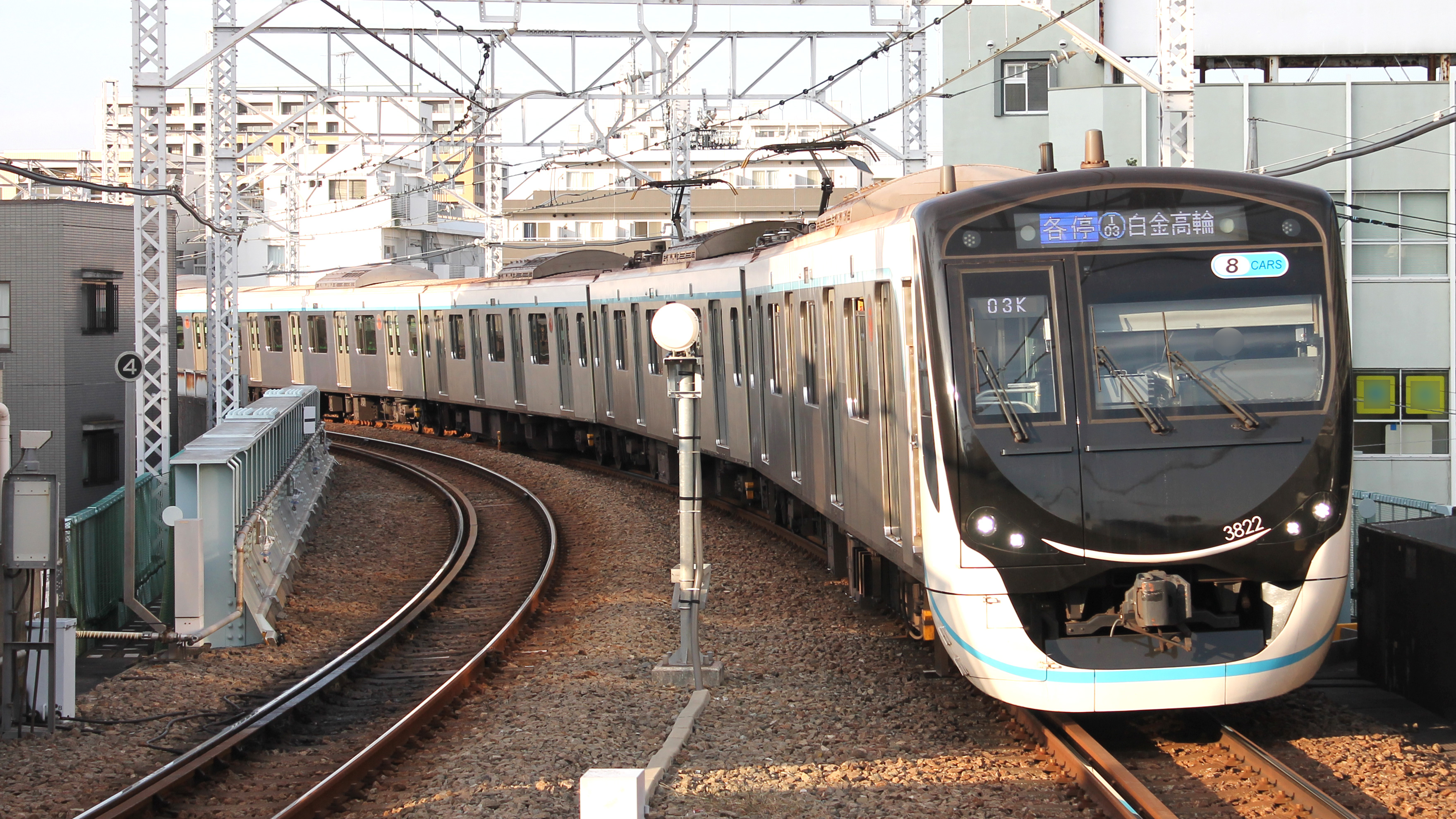
Tokyu 3020 series

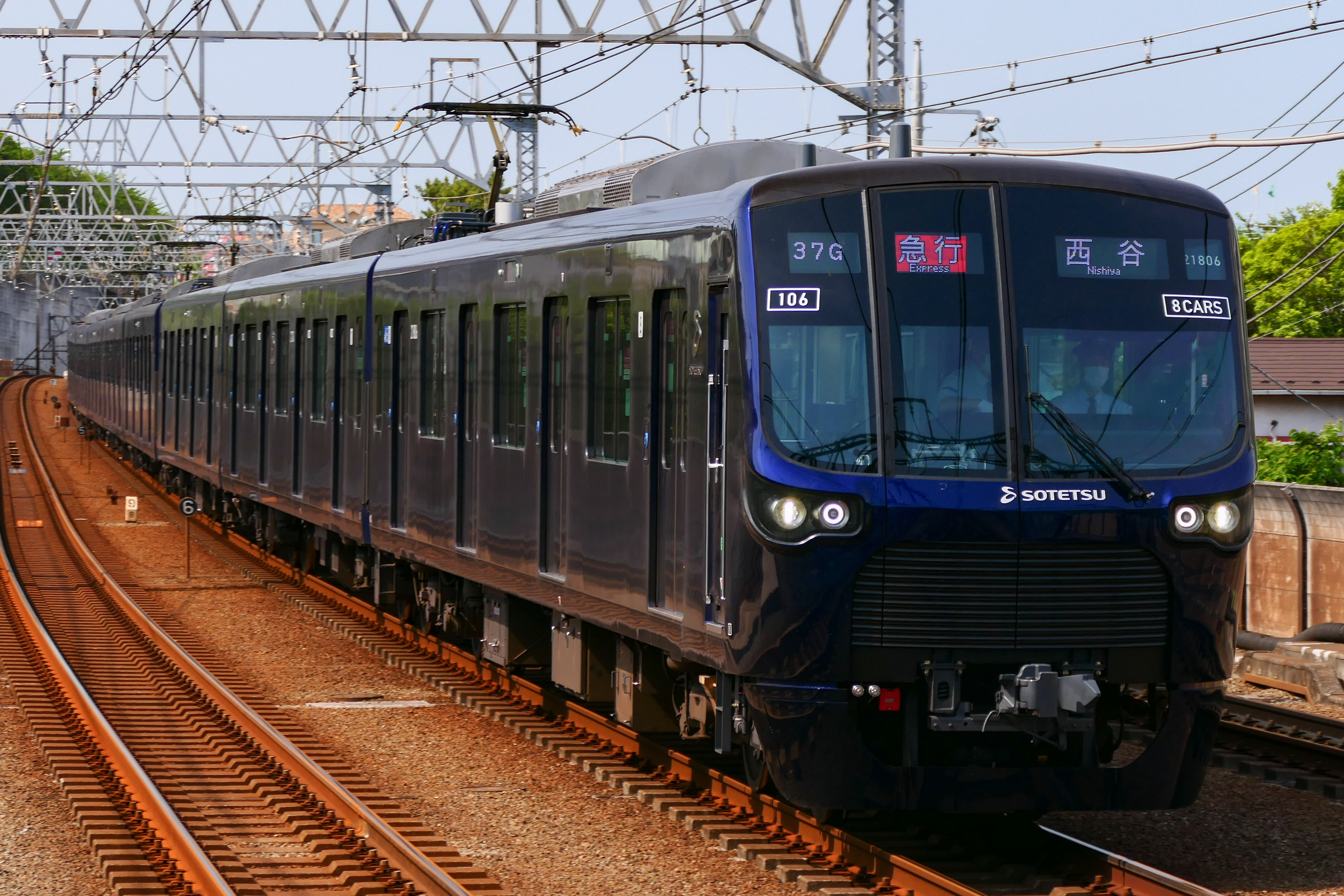
Sotetsu 21000 series

== See also ==
- Toei Subway rolling stock
- Tokyo subway
