= TRTA 3000 series =

Japanese train type

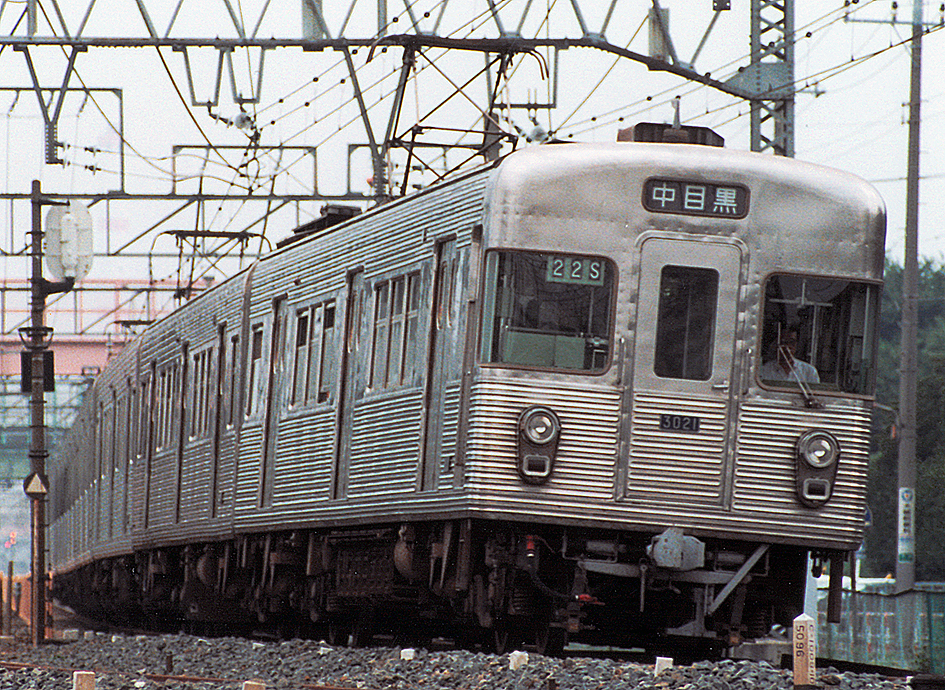
- TRTA 3000 series set 3021 on the Tobu Isesaki Line in 1988
- In service: 1961 – July 1994
- Constructed: 1960–1970
- Entered service: 28 April 1961
- Scrapped: 1988–
- Number built: 304 vehicles (38 sets)
- Number preserved: 2 vehicles (1 set)
- Successor: 03 series
- Formation: 2/4/6/8 cars per trainset
- Fleet numbers: 3001–3574
- Operator: TRTA
- Lines served: TRTA Hibiya Line, Tokyu Toyoko Line, Tobu Isesaki Line

Specifications
- Car body construction: Stainless steel
- Car length: 18,000 mm (59 ft 1 in)
- Width: 2,790 mm (9 ft 2 in)
- Height: 3,995 mm (13 ft 1.3 in)
- Doors: 3 pairs per side
- Maximum speed: 100 km/h (62 mph)
- Acceleration: 4.0 km/(h⋅s) (2.5 mph/s)
- Deceleration: 4.0 km/(h⋅s) (2.5 mph/s) (service); 5.0 km/(h⋅s) (3.1 mph/s) (emergency)
- Electric system: 1,500 V DC
- Current collection: Overhead catenary
- Safety systems: Tobu ATS, Tokyu ATS, WS-ATC (ATO)
- Track gauge: 1,067 mm (3 ft 6 in)

The TRTA 3000 series (営団3000系, Eidan 3000-kei) was an electric multiple unit (EMU) train type operated by TRTA (present-day Tokyo Metro) on the then TRTA Hibiya Line from 1961 to 1994.

== Operations ==
This train was fitted with safety systems compatible with the Tokyu Toyoko Line and Tobu Isesaki Line. This train was also compatible with driverless operation on the Hibiya Line section experimented starting from February 1962 by retrofitting car no. 3015 with autopilot equipment and was extended to the entire Hibiya Line by October 1970, with two additional cars, numbers 3057 and 3035 retrofitted with autopilot equipment in January and November 1963. The autopilot trials were stopped by 1987, and despite the autopilot equipment occupying a large space in these three cars these experiments subsequently became the basis of operating the Namboku Line in driverless mode. The 3000 series ran as full 8-car sets.

== Formations ==
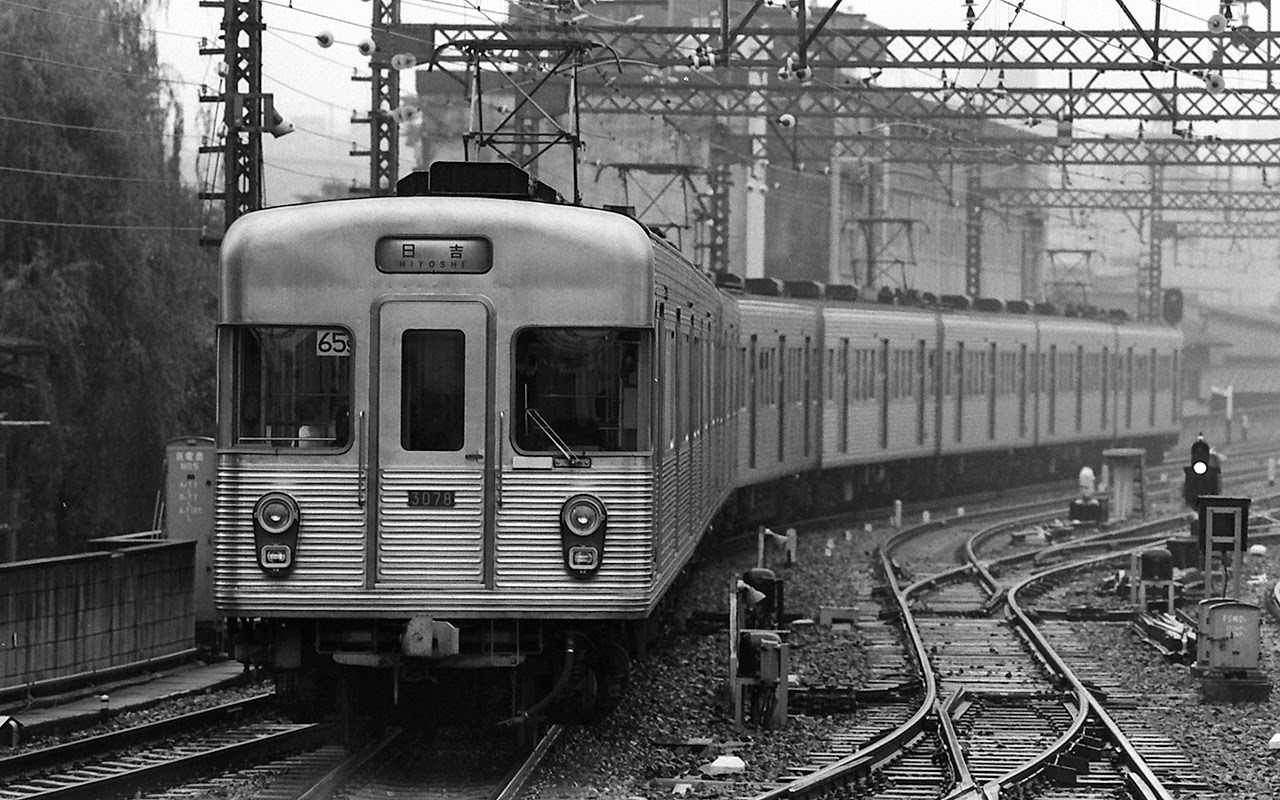
Set 3078 in June 1977

The first 3000 series trains were built as two-car sets, but the fleet was gradually lengthened to four-car, six-car, and finally eight-car formations, as shown below.

=== March 1961 - ===
Designation	CM1	CM2
Numbering	3000	3000

=== May 1962 - ===
Designation	CM1	M2	M1	CM2
Numbering	3000	4000	4000	3000

=== August 1964 - ===
Designation	CM1	M2	M1	M2	M1	CM2
Numbering	3000	4000	4500	4500	4000	3000

=== May 1971 - 1994 ===
Designation	CM1	M2	M1	Mc2	Mc1	M2	M1	CM2
Numbering	3000	4000	4500	3500	3500	4500	4000	3000

The Mc cars had small driving cabs for use in depot shunting.

== History ==
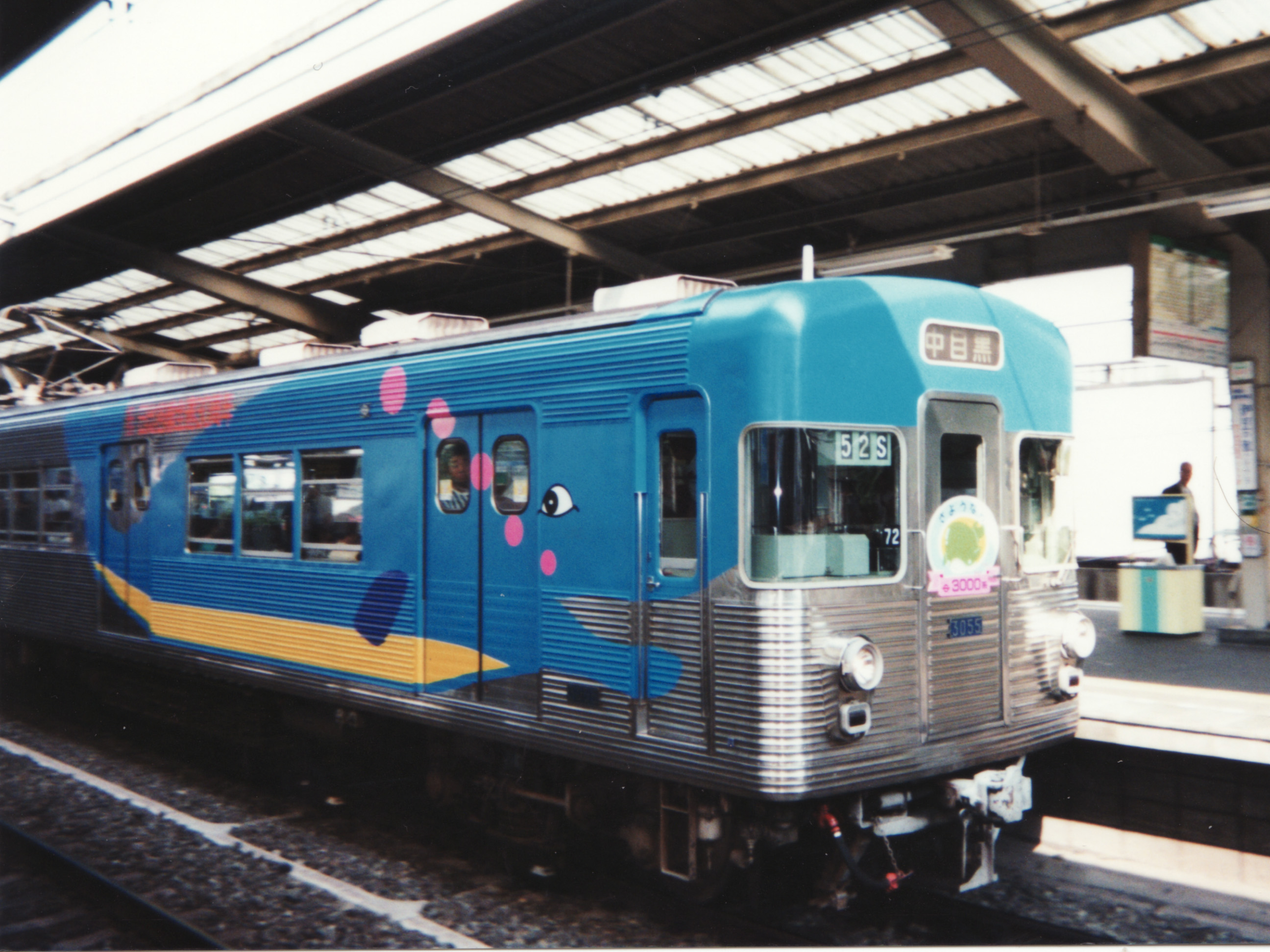
Set 3055 in special whale livery on a farewell run in July 1994

The 3000 series trains were gradually phased out from 1988 following the introduction of new 03 series EMUs. The last sets ran in revenue service on 22 July 1994, with a special "sayonara" run for rail enthusiasts on the following day using set 3055, specially decorated in a "whale" colour scheme and carrying a "Sayonara 3000 series" headboard.

== Resale ==
Some trains were sold to the Nagano Electric Railway where they were operated as two-car and three-car sets reclassified as 3500 and 3600 series.

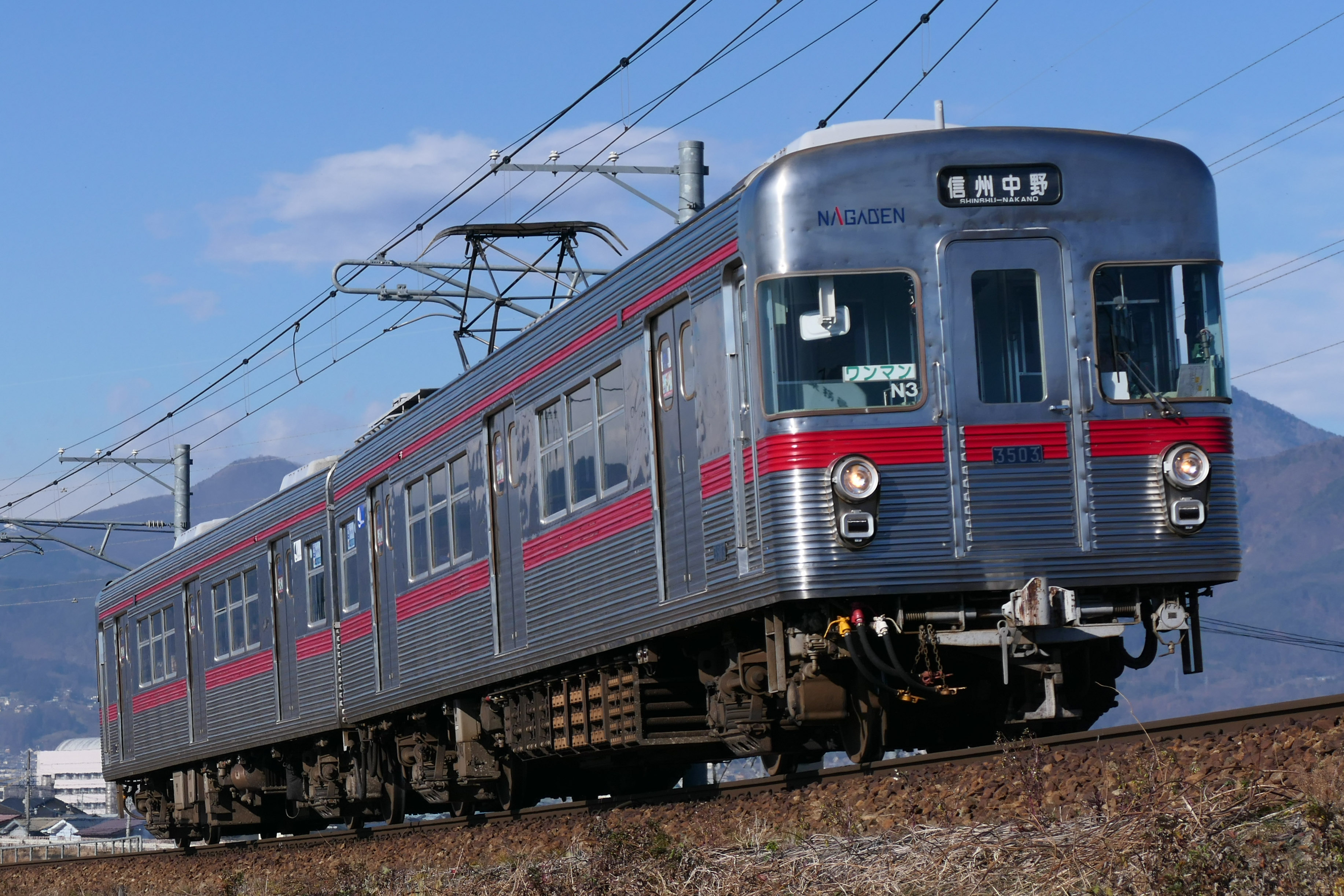
A Nagano Electric Railway 3500 series set in December 2019

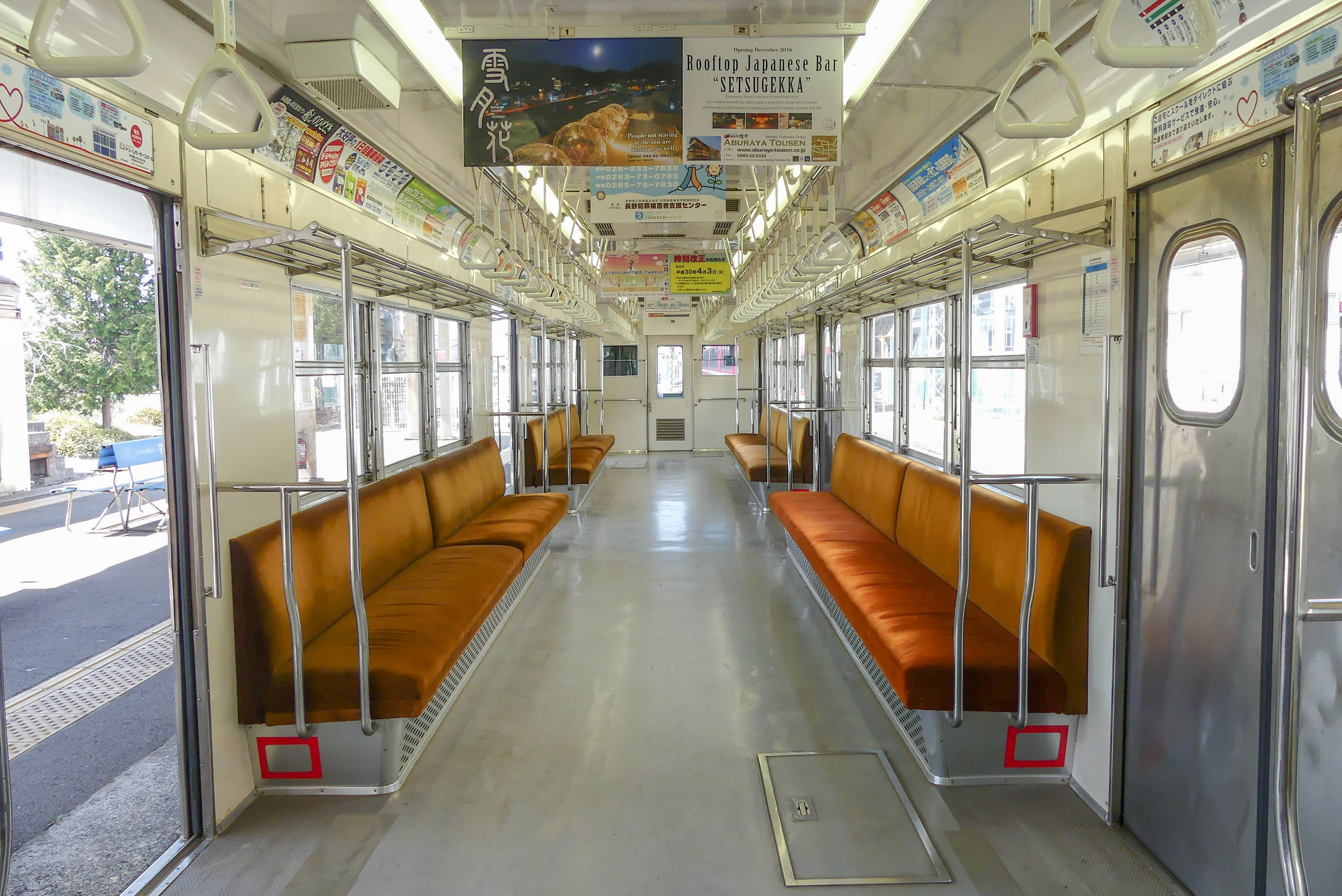
Interior in March 2018

Pantographs and traction motors from withdrawn 3000 series cars were also reclaimed for use on Choshi Electric Railway 1000 series electric cars.

== Preserved examples ==
Two cars, 3001 and 3002, were returned to Tokyo Metro's Ayase Depot in 2007 following their withdrawal from service on the Nagano Electric Railway. The two cars were moved to Senju Depot in 2015 where they are undergoing further renovation.

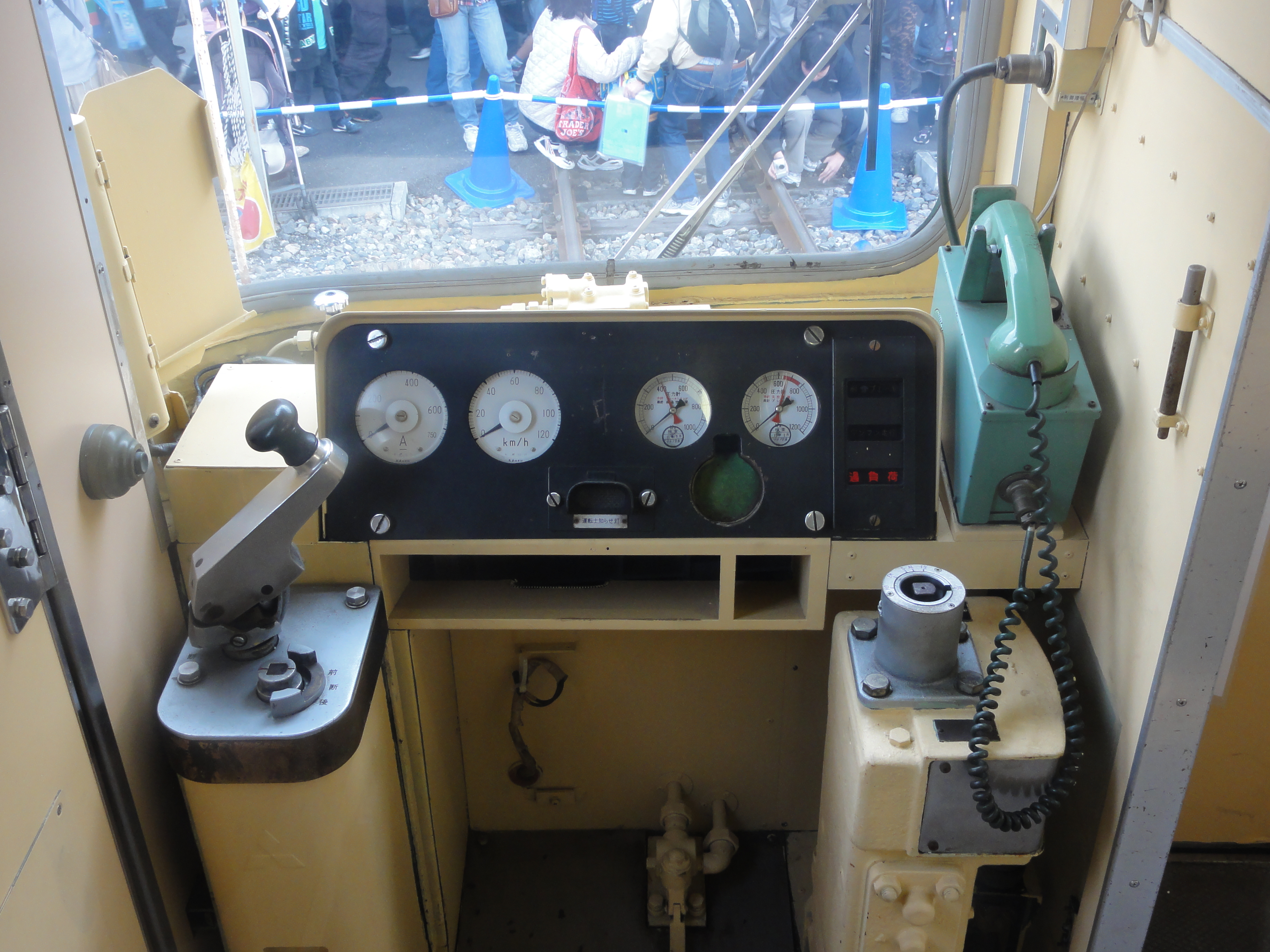
Driver's cab of preserved car 3001 in November 2010

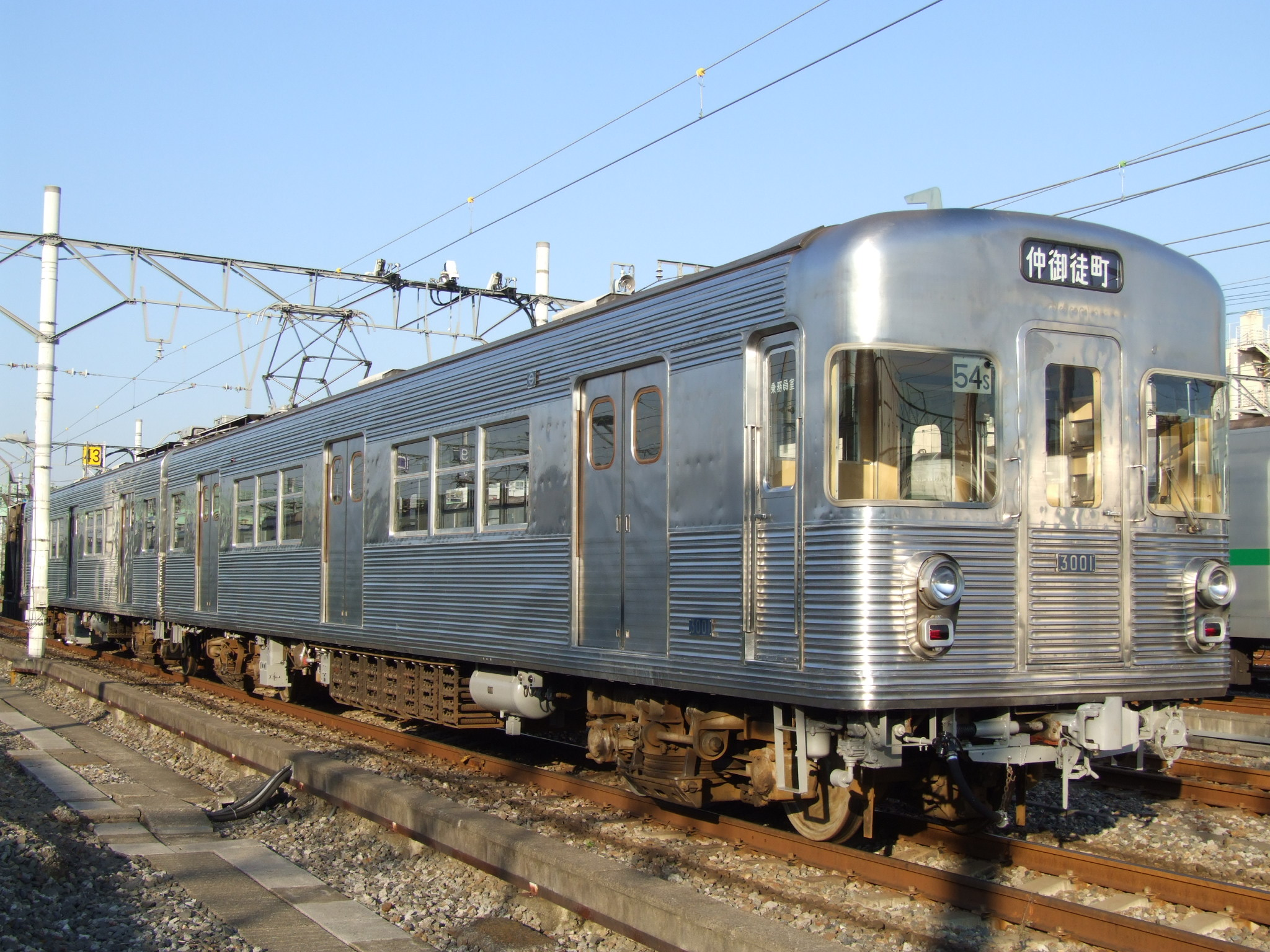
Preserved 3000 series cars 3001 and 3002 at Ayase Depot in December 2007

== See also ==
- List of driverless trains
