= Tokyo Metro 13000 series =

Japanese electric multiple unit train type

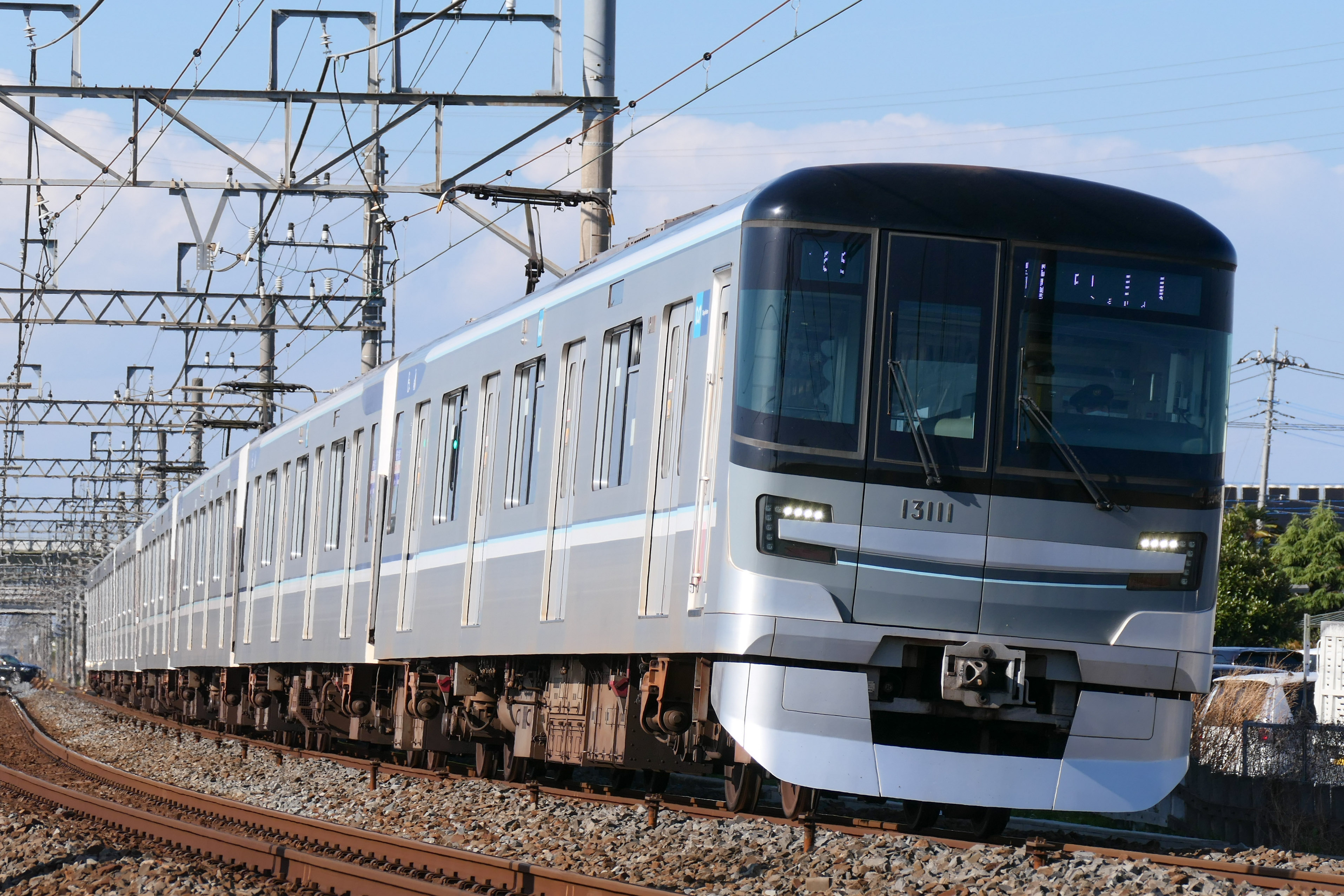
- Set 13122 on the Tobu Skytree Line in April 2021

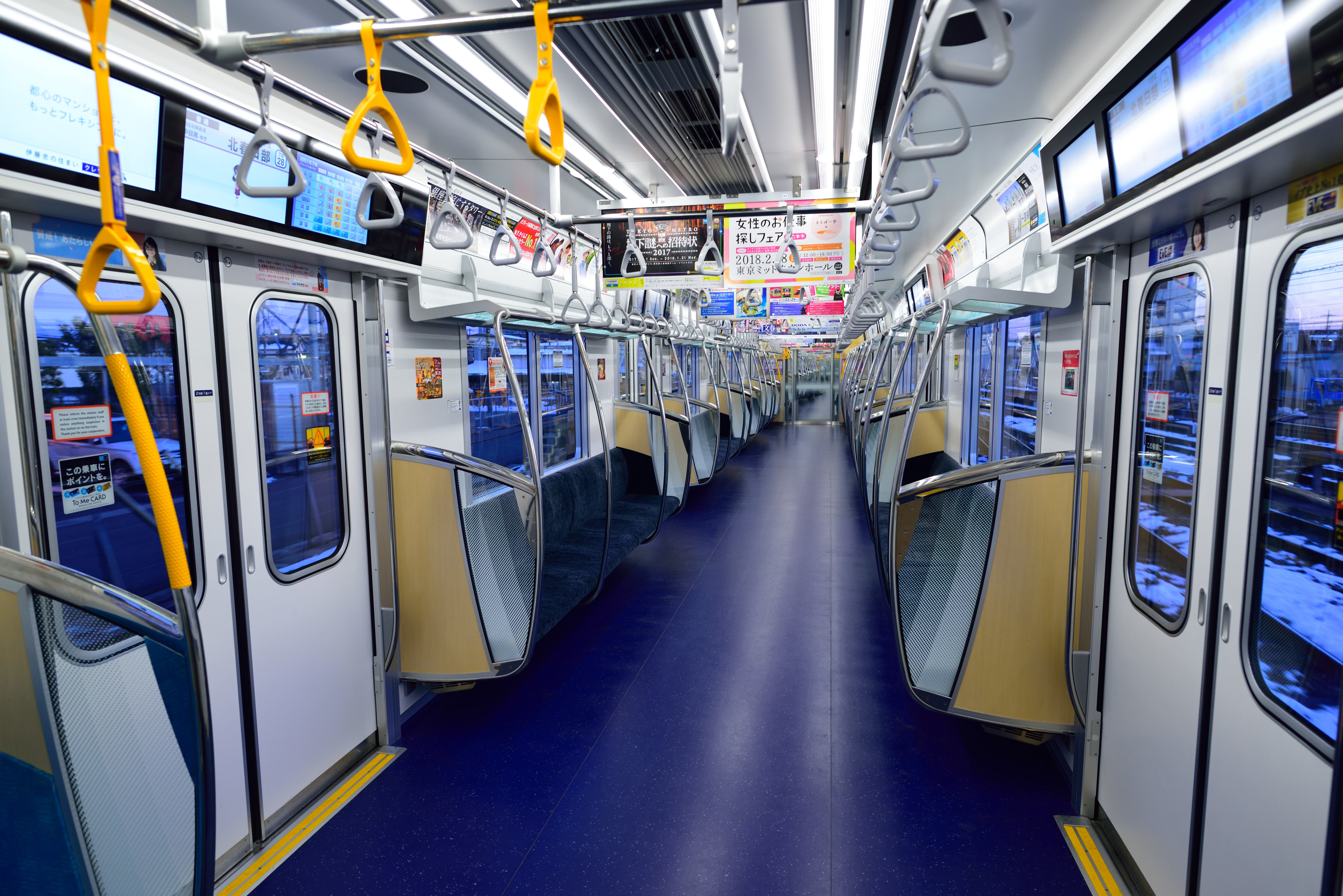
- Interior of the 13000 series, January 2018
- In service: 2017–present
- Manufacturer: Kinki Sharyo
- Replaced: 03 series
- Constructed: 2016–2020
- Entered service: 25 March 2017
- Number built: 308 vehicles (44 sets) (as of 25 April 2020)
- Number in service: 308 vehicles (44 sets)
- Formation: 7 cars per trainset
- Fleet numbers: 13101–13144
- Capacity: 1,035
- Operator: Tokyo Metro
- Depots: Senju, Takenotsuka
- Lines served: Tokyo Metro Hibiya Line; Tobu Skytree Line; Tobu Nikko Line

Specifications
- Car body construction: Aluminium alloy
- Car length: 20,470 mm (67 ft 2 in) (end cars); 20,000 mm (65 ft 7 in) (intermediate cars)
- Width: 2,780 mm (9 ft 1 in)
- Height: 3,585 mm (11 ft 9.1 in)
- Floor height: 1,140 mm (3 ft 9 in)
- Doors: 4 pairs per side
- Maximum speed: 110 km/h (68 mph)
- Weight: 239.1 t (235.3 long tons; 263.6 short tons)
- Traction system: Mitsubishi 2-level VVVF; 13101–13121: Si-IGBT switching device 13122–13144: SiC-MOSFET switching device
- Traction motors: Toshiba totally enclosed self-cooling PMSM
- Power output: 2,870 kW (3,849 hp) (205 kW x 2 per car)
- Transmission: Westinghouse-Natal Drive; Gear ratio: 7.79:1
- Acceleration: 3.3 km/(h⋅s) (2.1 mph/s)
- Deceleration: 3.7 km/(h⋅s) (2.3 mph/s) (service); 4.5 km/(h⋅s) (2.8 mph/s) (emergency)
- Electric systems: 1,500 V DC (overhead catenary)
- Current collection: Pantograph
- AAR wheel arrangement: 7 × (A1)(1A)
- Bogies: SC103
- Braking system: Electronically controlled pneumatic brakes with regenerative braking
- Safety systems: New CS-ATC, Tobu ATS
- Coupling system: Shibata
- Track gauge: 1,067 mm (3 ft 6 in)

The Tokyo Metro 13000 series (東京メトロ13000系, Tōkyō Metoro 13000-kei) is a Japanese DC commuter electric multiple unit (EMU) train type operated by the Tokyo subway operator Tokyo Metro on Tokyo Metro Hibiya Line and Tobu Skytree Line inter-running services. Introduced into service on 25 March 2017, a total of 44 seven-car sets were built by Kinki Sharyo between 2016 and 2020 to replace the 03 series fleet.

== Overview ==
A total of 44 seven-car 13000 series trains (294 vehicles) replaced the 03 series EMUs used on Tokyo Metro Hibiya Line and Tobu Skytree Line inter-running services. Due to the effective length of the new trains which have 20 m (65 ft 7 in) long cars instead of the 18 m (59 ft 1 in) long cars of the 03 series, new sets were formed of seven cars instead of the previous eight cars per set. A unified door arrangement with four pairs per side instead of the mixture of three and five pairs per side on the 03 series trains allows the platform edge doors to be installed at Tokyo Metro Hibiya Line stations once the older train fleets have been replaced. The trains use permanent-magnet synchronous motors, offering 25% energy savings compared to the motors used in earlier 03 series trains.

== Formation ==
The 13000 series trains are formed as seven-car sets, as shown below, with car 1 at the Kita-Senju (northern) end. Each car is motored, with only the outer axle on each bogie motored.

	← Naka-Meguro Kita-Senju →						
Car No.	7	6	5	4	3	2	1
Designation	CM1	M1	M2	M3	M2'	M1'	CM2
Numbering	13100	13200	13300	13400	13500	13600	13000
Weight (t)	35.0	33.4	33.6	35.4	33.3	33.5	34.9
Capacity (total/seated)	140/45	151/51	151/51	151/51	151/51	151/51	140/45

Car 4 has two single-arm pantographs, and cars 2 and 6 each have one.

== Interior ==
Internally, the trains use LED lighting throughout. Three 17-inch LCD passenger information displays are provided above each doorway, with information given in four languages (Japanese, Chinese, English, Korean). Seating consists of longitudinal bench seats throughout, with a seat width of 460 mm (18 in) per person, an increase of 30 mm (1.2 in) over the seats of the 03 series. Areas for wheelchairs and pushchairs are provided at one end of each car.

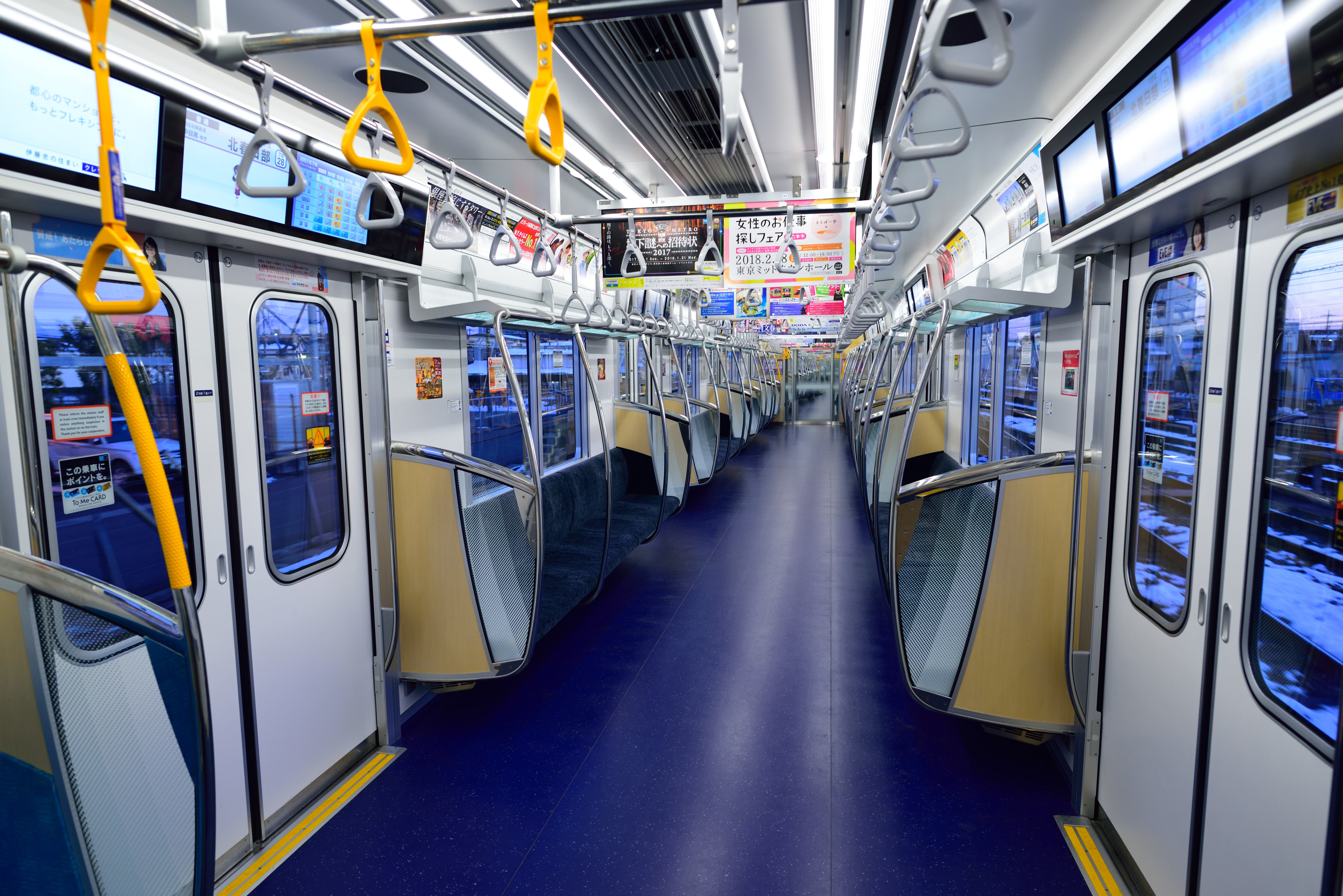
General interior view, January 2018

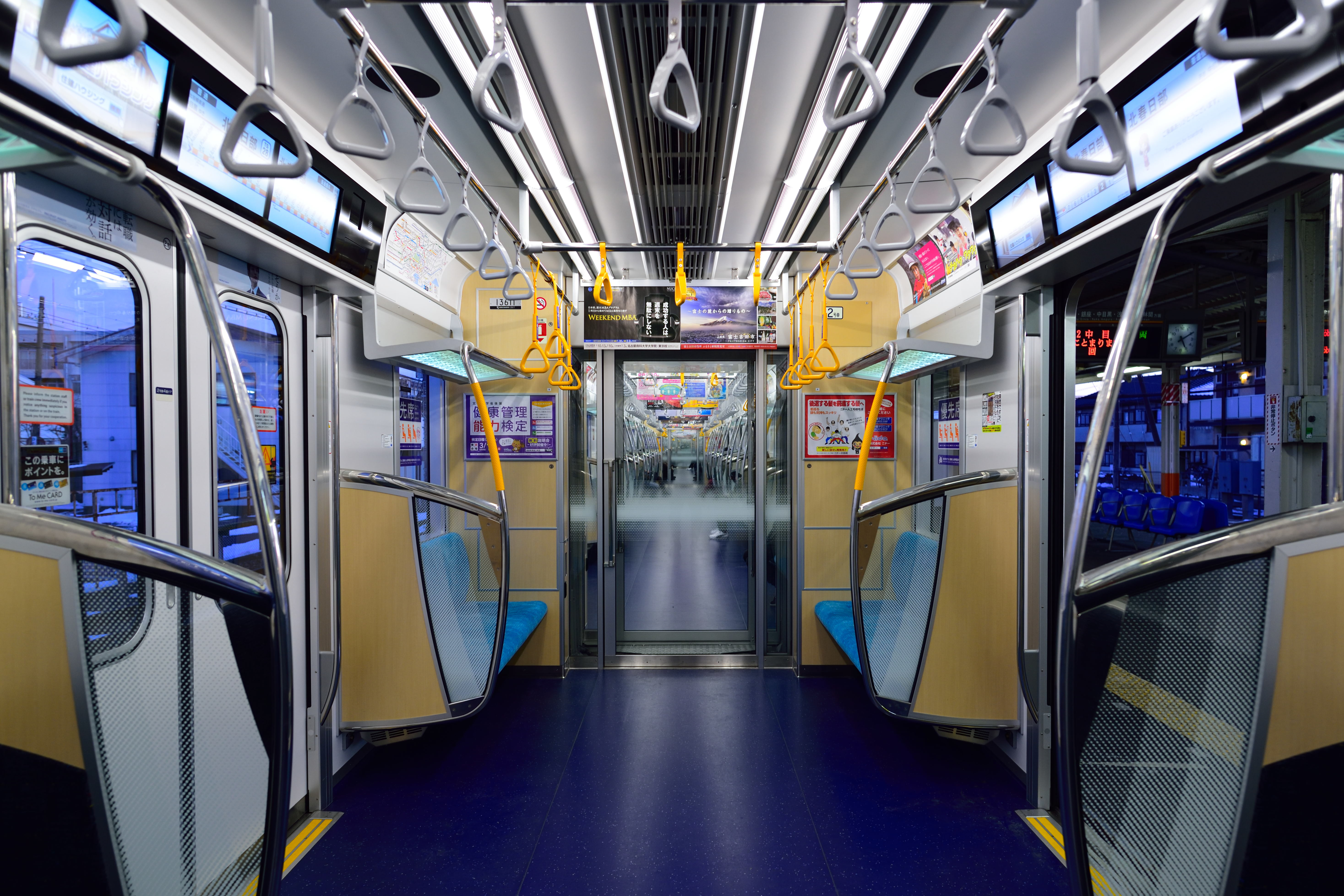
Priority seating, January 2018

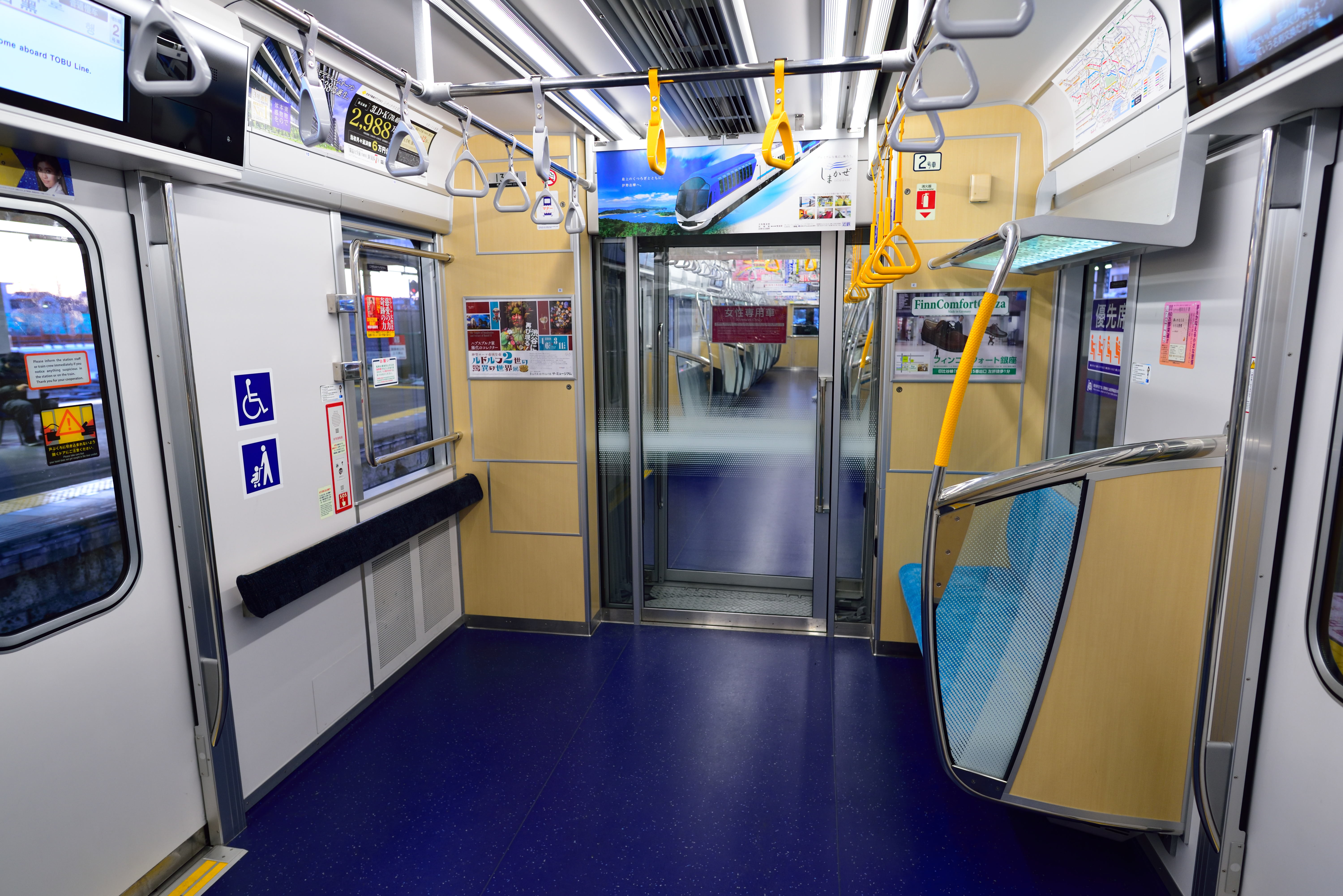
Priority seating with an area for wheelchairs and pushchairs, January 2018

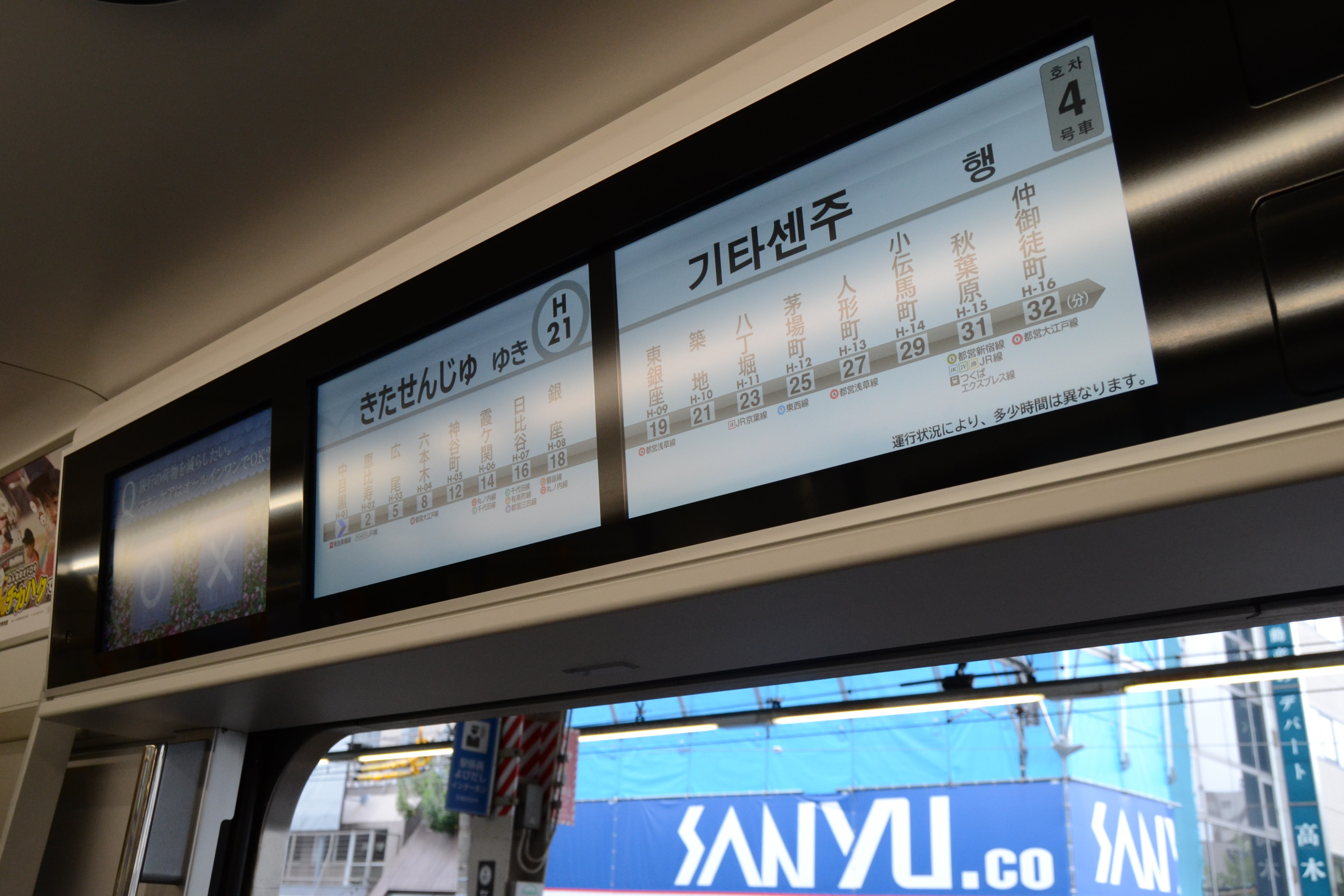
LCD passenger information screens above a doorway in May 2017

== History ==
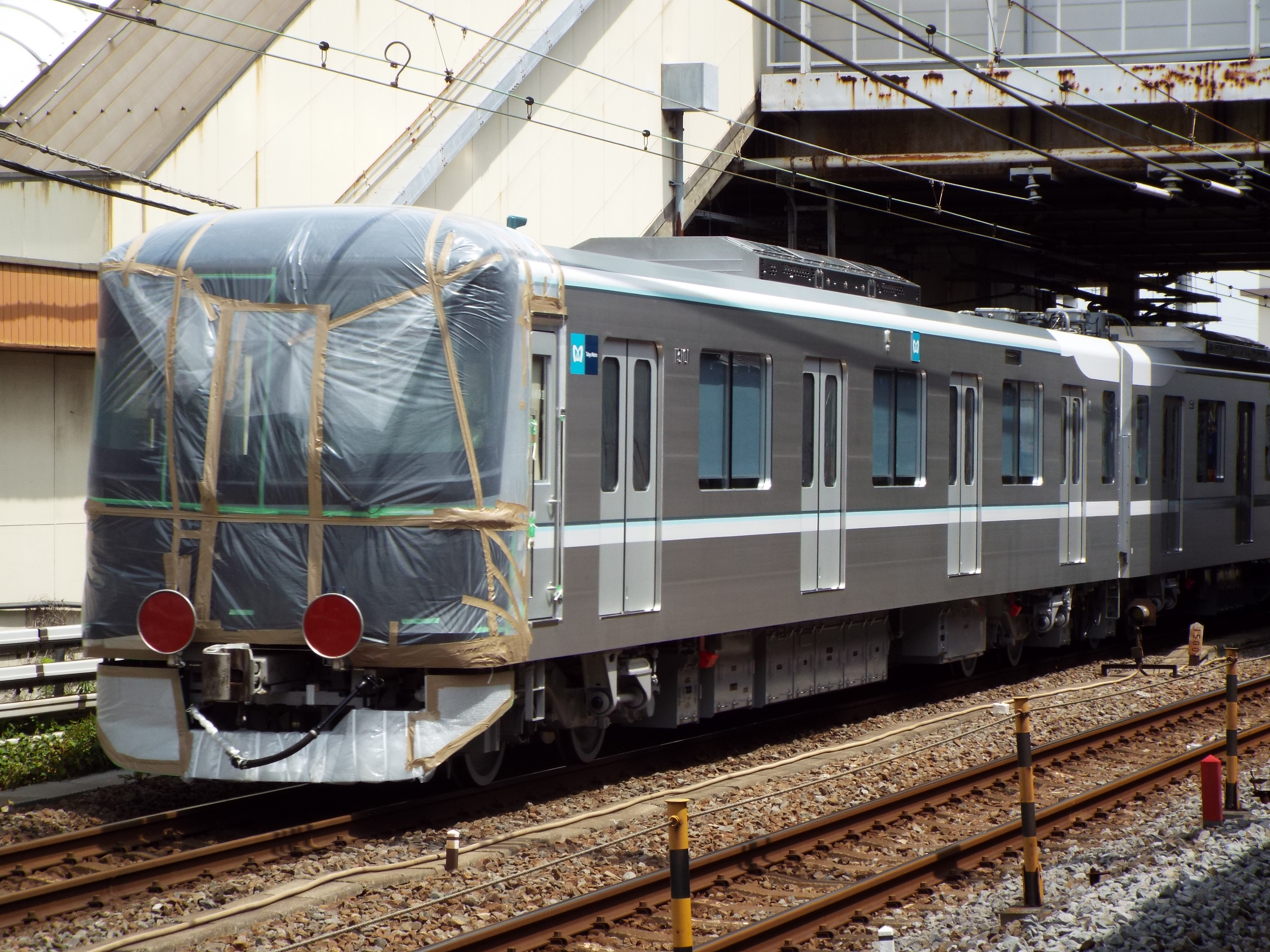
The first set, 13101, on delivery in June 2016

Tokyo Metro announced its plans to introduce a new fleet of trains with 20 m (65 ft 7 in) long cars and four sets of doors per side on each car in April 2014, jointly with Tobu Railway. Details of the new 13000 series trains on order were officially announced on 17 June 2015, together with details of the Tobu 70000 series to be introduced around the same time. The entire fleet of 44 trains (308 vehicles) is scheduled to be delivered between fiscal 2016 and fiscal 2020.

The first set, 13101, was delivered from the Kinki Sharyo factory in Osaka to Tokyo Metro's depot at Minami-Senju in June 2016, and was officially revealed to the media on 31 August 2016.

The trains entered full revenue service on 25 March 2017.

=== Synchronous reluctance motor testing ===
Between March and April 2021, a 13000 series set was used as a testbed by Tokyo Metro and Mitsubishi Electric to determine the feasibility of synchronous reluctance motors (SynRMs) for railway applications. The experiment proved successful, and it was observed that the new traction system offered 18% energy savings over traditional systems using induction motors.

In October 2026, Tokyo Metro announced that it would implement the new motor technology into nine Tozai Line 05 series sets. The first retrofitted set is scheduled to return to service in December of that year.

== Build histories ==
The delivery dates for the fleet are as shown below.

Set No.	Date delivered
13101	6 December 2016
13102	4 January 2017
13103	27 April 2017
13104	14 May 2017
13105	31 May 2017
13106	17 June 2017
13107	4 July 2017
13108	21 July 2017
13109	7 August 2017
13110	24 August 2017
13111	10 September 2017
13112	27 September 2017
13113	14 October 2017
13114	31 October 2017
13115	17 November 2017
13116	4 December 2017
13117	12 April 2018
13118	29 April 2018
13119	16 May 2018
13120	7 June 2018
13121	19 July 2018
13122	31 August 2018
13123	27 September 2018
13124	18 October 2018
13125	4 November 2018
13126	21 November 2018
13127	8 December 2018
13128	26 December 2018
13129	23 January 2019
13130	25 April 2019
13131	12 May 2019
13132	6 June 2019
13133	21 June 2019
13134	10 July 2019
13135	27 July 2019
13136	15 August 2019
13137	1 September 2019
13138	4 October 2019
13139	24 October 2019
13140	14 November 2019
13141	1 December 2019
13142	18 December 2019
13143	22 April 2020
13144	13 May 2020
