= Tokyo Metro 03 series =

Japanese train type

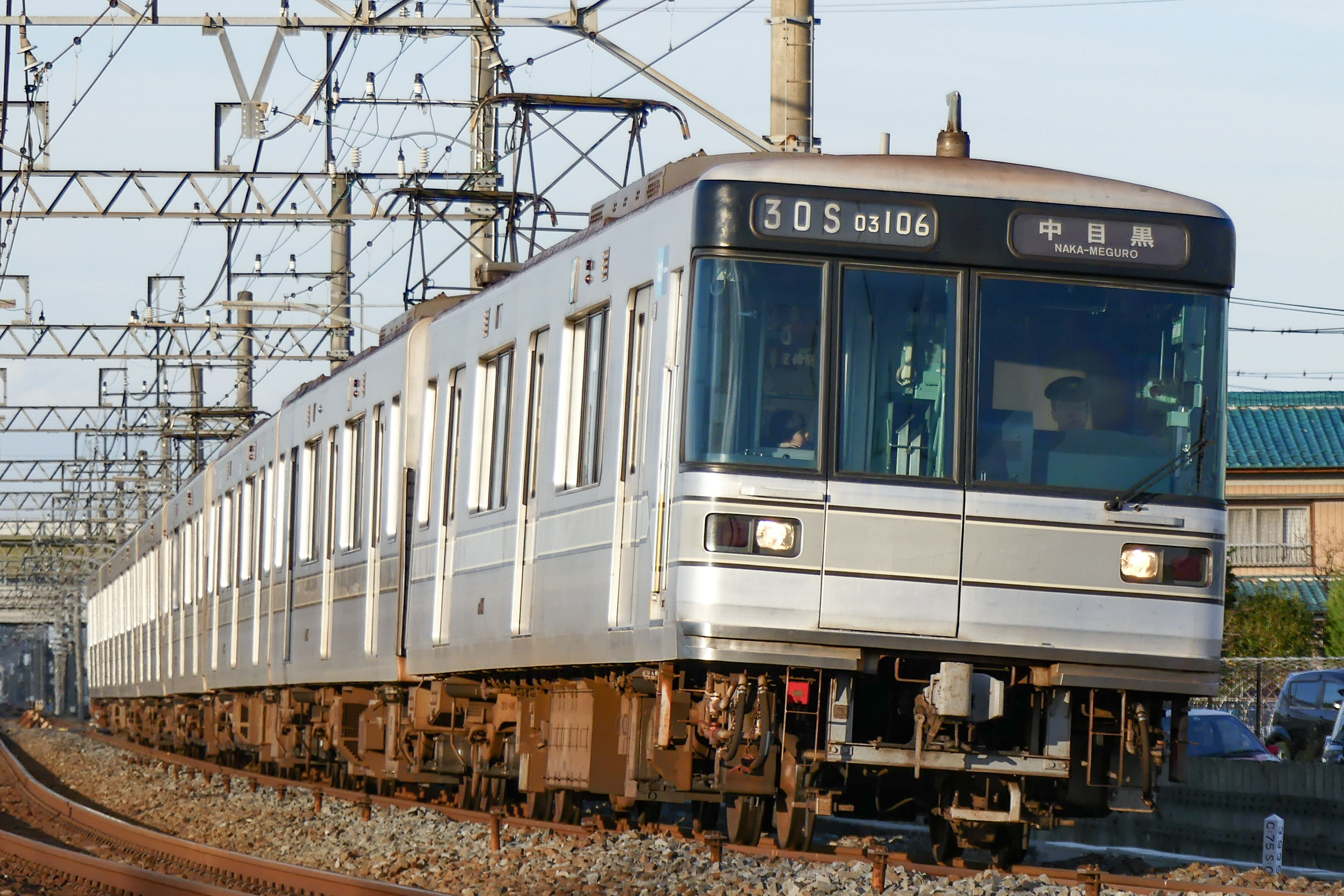
- An 03 series train on the Tobu Nikko Line in December 2018
- Stock type: Electric multiple unit
- In service: 1988–February 2020
- Manufacturers: Kawasaki Heavy Industries, Nippon Sharyo, Kinki Sharyo, Tokyu Car Corporation
- Replaced: TRTA 3000 series (Tokyo Metro); Nagaden 3500/3600 series (Nagaden); Kumaden 6000 series (Kumaden)
- Constructed: 1988–1994, 2001
- Entered service: 1 July 1988
- Scrapped: 2017–2020
- Number built: 337 vehicles (42 sets)
- Number in service: 6 vehicles (3 sets) on Kumamoto Dentetsu, and 3 vehicles (1 set) on Nagano Dentetsu
- Number scrapped: 328 vehicles (+1 from accident damage)
- Successor: Tokyo Metro 13000 series
- Formation: 8 cars per trainset (Hibiya Line); 2 cars per trainset (Kumamoto Dentetsu); 3 cars per trainset (Nagano Dentetsu)
- Operators: Eidan/TRTA (1988–2004); Tokyo Metro (2004–2020); Kumamoto Electric Railway (2019–); Nagano Electric Railway (2020–)
- Depots: Senju, Takenotsuka
- Lines served: Tokyo Metro Hibiya Line, Tobu Skytree Line, Tōbu Nikkō Line, Tokyu Toyoko Line (until 2013)

Specifications
- Car body construction: Aluminium
- Car length: 18 m (59 ft 1 in)
- Width: 2.83 m (9 ft 3 in)
- Height: 3.99 m (13 ft 1 in) (sets 01-25); 3.973 m (13 ft 0.4 in) (sets 26-42); 3.995 m (13 ft 1.3 in) (including pantograph)
- Doors: 3 pairs per side, 5 pairs per side (cars 1,2,7,8 of later sets)
- Maximum speed: 110 km/h (68.4 mph)
- Weight: 21.9-32.7 t (chopper control), 21.3-31.0 t (VVVF)
- Traction system: 4-quadrant GTO chopper Variable frequency (IGBT)
- Power output: 160 kW or 190 kW
- Transmission: Westinghouse-Natal Drive; Gear ratio: 5.73 : 1 (chopper control), 7.79 : 1 (VVVF)
- Acceleration: 3.3 km/(h⋅s) (2.1 mph/s)
- Deceleration: 4 km/(h⋅s) (2.5 mph/s)(service); 5 km/(h⋅s) (3.1 mph/s) (emergency)
- Electric system: 1,500 V DC overhead
- Current collection: Lozenge-style pantograph
- Bogies: SS-111, SS-011 (chopper control), SS-135, SS-035 (VVVF)
- Braking systems: Electronically controlled pneumatic brakes, regenerative braking
- Safety systems: WS-ATC, Tokyu CS-ATC/ATS, Tobu ATS
- Coupling system: Janney coupler
- Track gauge: 1,067 mm (3 ft 6 in)

The Tokyo Metro 03 series (東京メトロ03系, Tōkyō Metoro 03-kei) was an electric multiple unit (EMU) train type operated by the Tokyo subway operator Tokyo Metro in Tokyo, Japan. A total of 42 eight-car trainsets were built, between 1988 and 1994, entering service on 1 July 1988 and the final sets were withdrawn by 8 February 2020.

== Operations ==
The 03 series trains operated on the Tokyo Metro Hibiya Line, with through-running to and from the Tobu Skytree Line and before 2013, on the Tokyu Toyoko Line.

== Formations ==
As of 1 April 2017, the fleet consisted of 40 eight-car sets, formed as shown below, with car 1 at the Naka-Meguro (south) end. Sets consisted of four motored ("M") cars and four non-powered trailer ("T") cars.

Car No.	8	7	6	5	4	3	2	1
Designation	CT1	M1	M2	Tc	Tc'	M1	M2	CT2
Numbering	03-100	03-200	03-300	03-400	03-500	03-600	03-700	03-800

- The M1 cars (cars 2 and 6) each had two lozenge-style pantographs.
- Cars 1, 2, 7, and 8 in sets 09 to 28 had five pairs of doors per side instead of three.
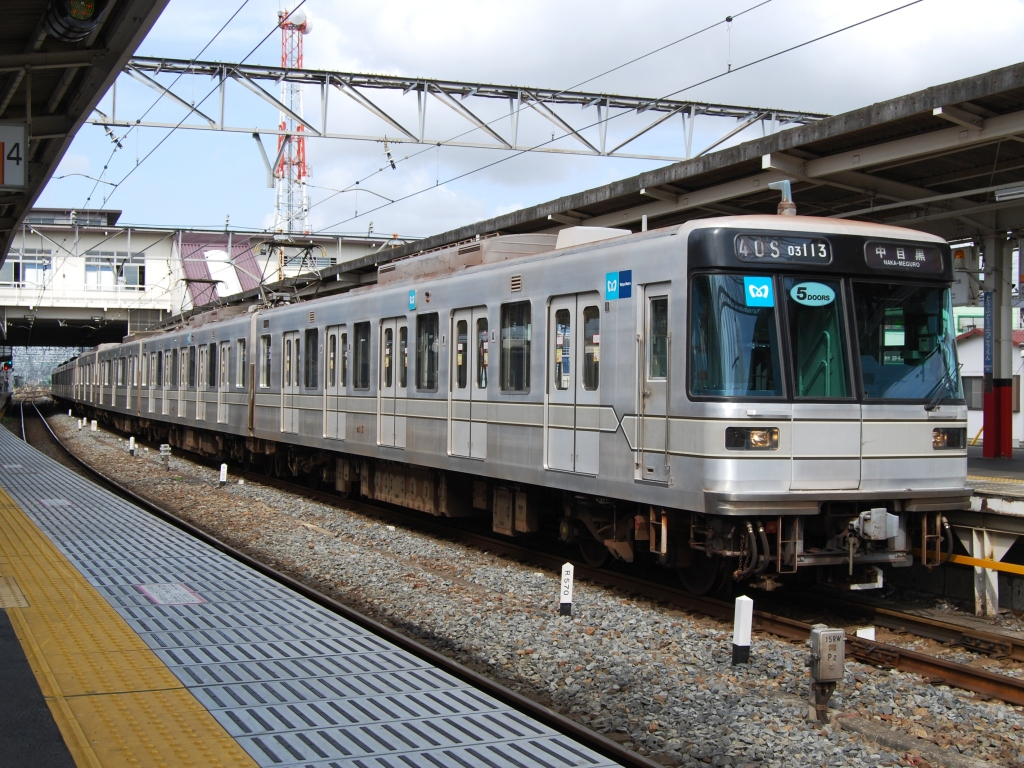
Set 13 in October 2008, with five-door end cars

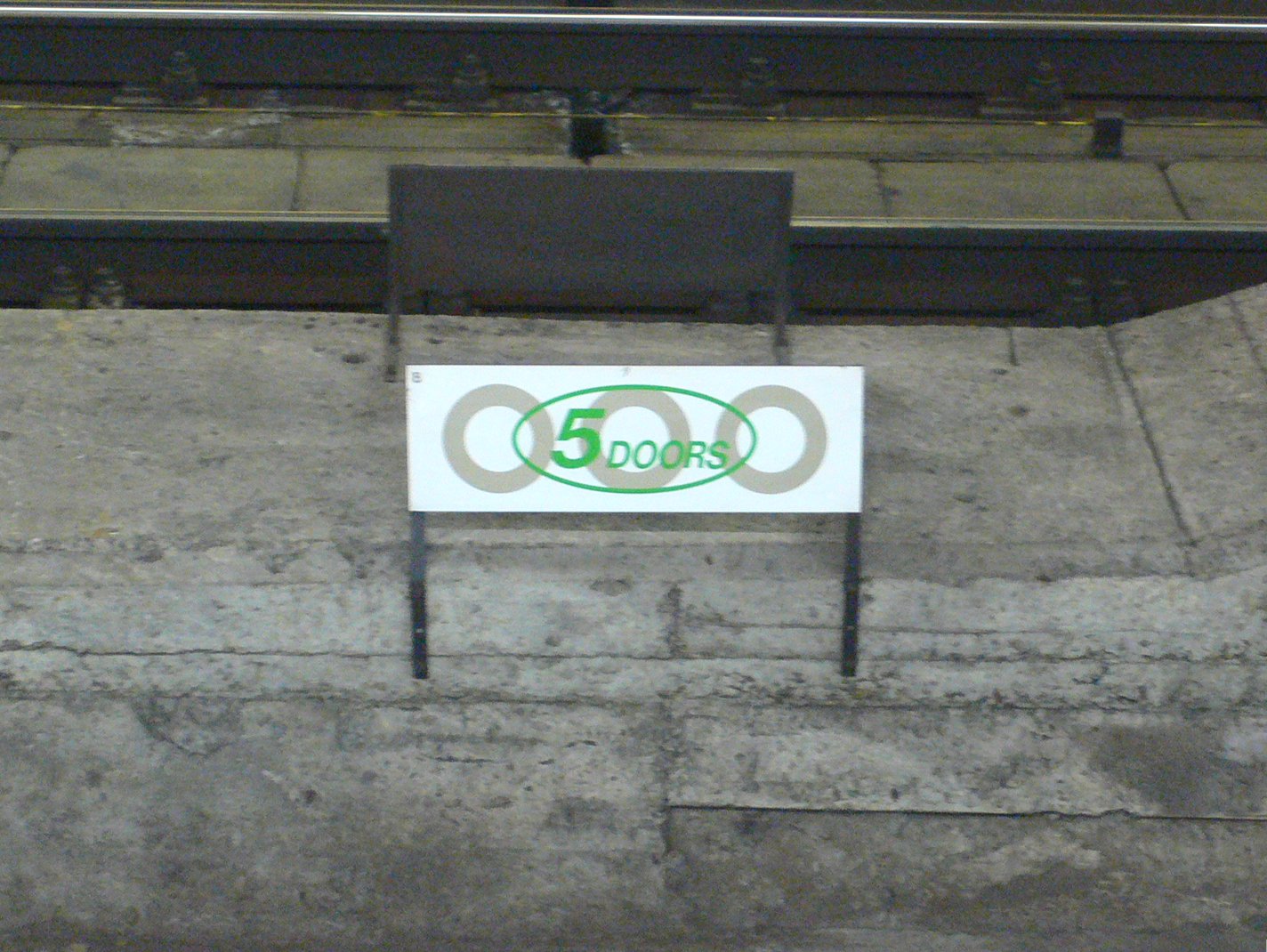
A position marker at a Hibiya Line station for the 5-door cars of the 03 series.

== Withdrawal ==
The 03 series trains began to be replaced by new 13000 series trains from 25 March 2017. The first set to be withdrawn, set 14, was removed for scrapping in February 2017.

The 03 series was fully retired from the Hibiya Line on 28 February 2020 with no fanfare; Tokyo Metro cited the inconvenience created from the crowding of train enthusiasts during the farewell event for the 6000 series as the main reason for this decision.

== Resale ==
=== Kumamoto Electric Railway ===
Three former 03 series EMUs were resold for use by the Kumamoto Electric Railway in Kumamoto Prefecture between 2018 and 2020. They entered service on 4 April 2019.

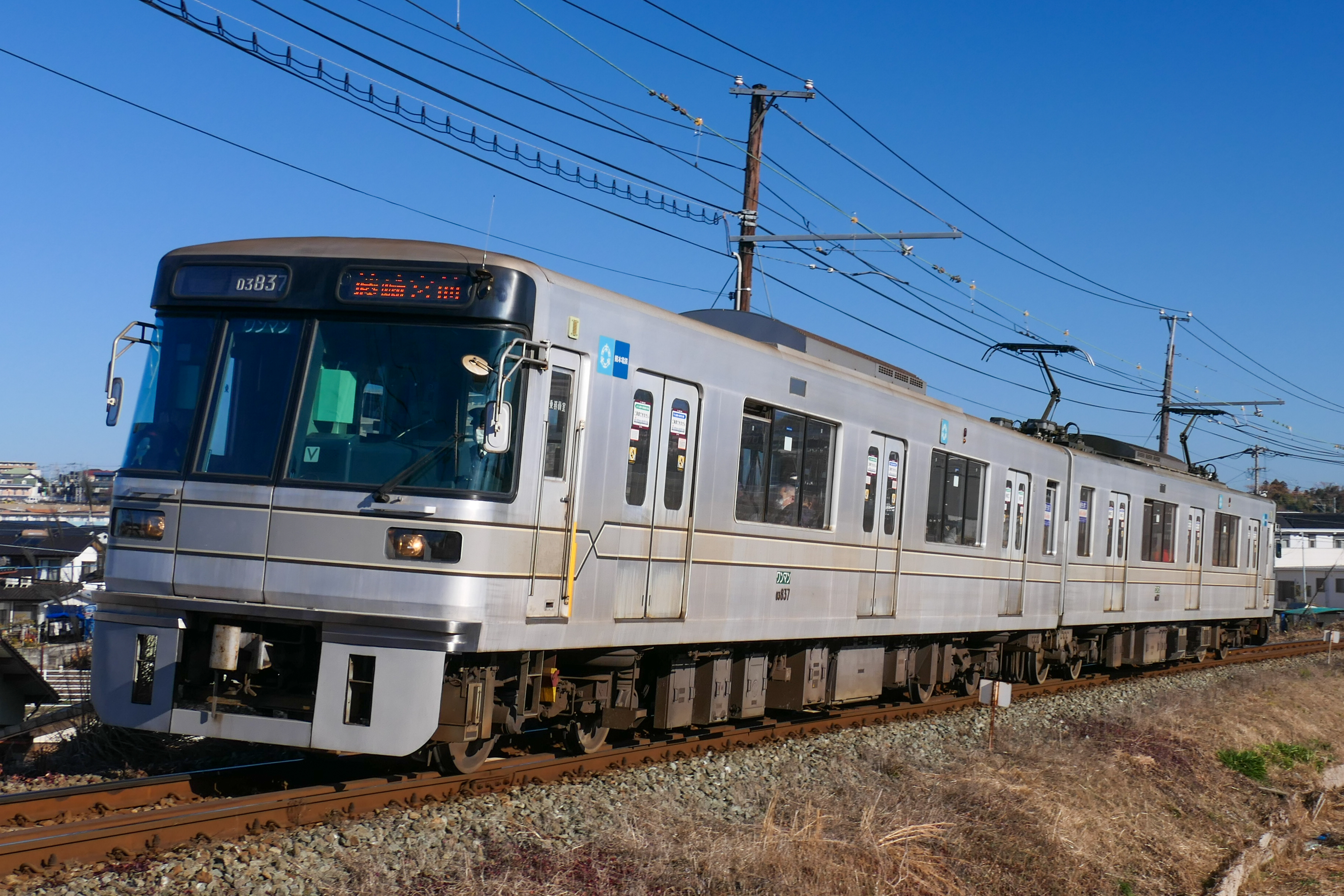
A 03 series train in service on the Kumamoto Electric Railway. These maintain the Tokyo Metro classification and numbering.

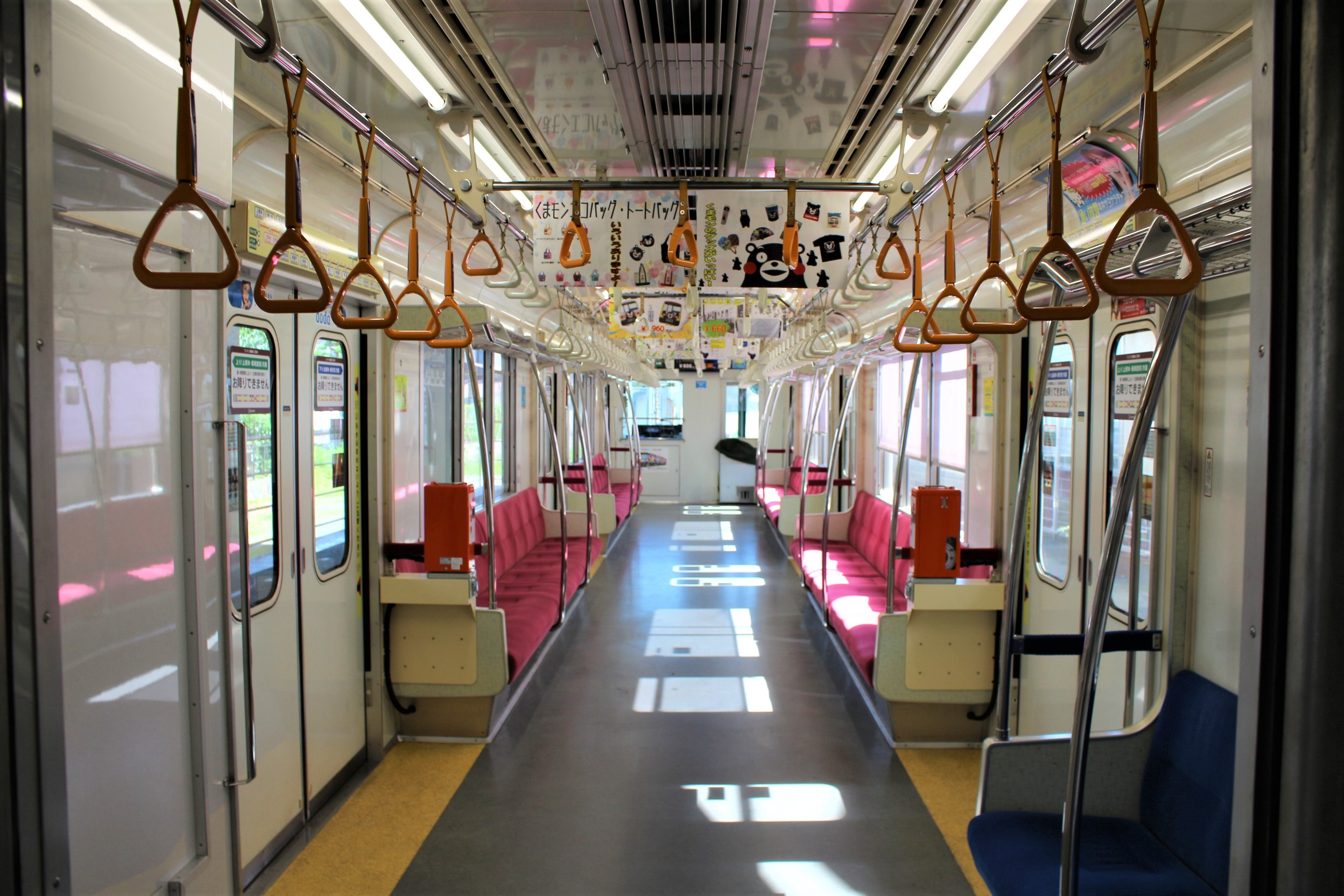
Interior of the Kumaden 03 series

=== Nagano Electric Railway ===
On 31 January 2020, Nagano Electric Railway announced the second-hand purchase of a few 03 series units, which would be redesignated as the 3000 series. They're intended to replace the older 3500 series (ex-TRTA 3000 series, also ex-Hibiya Line stock) which were used on the local service rolling stock on the railway.

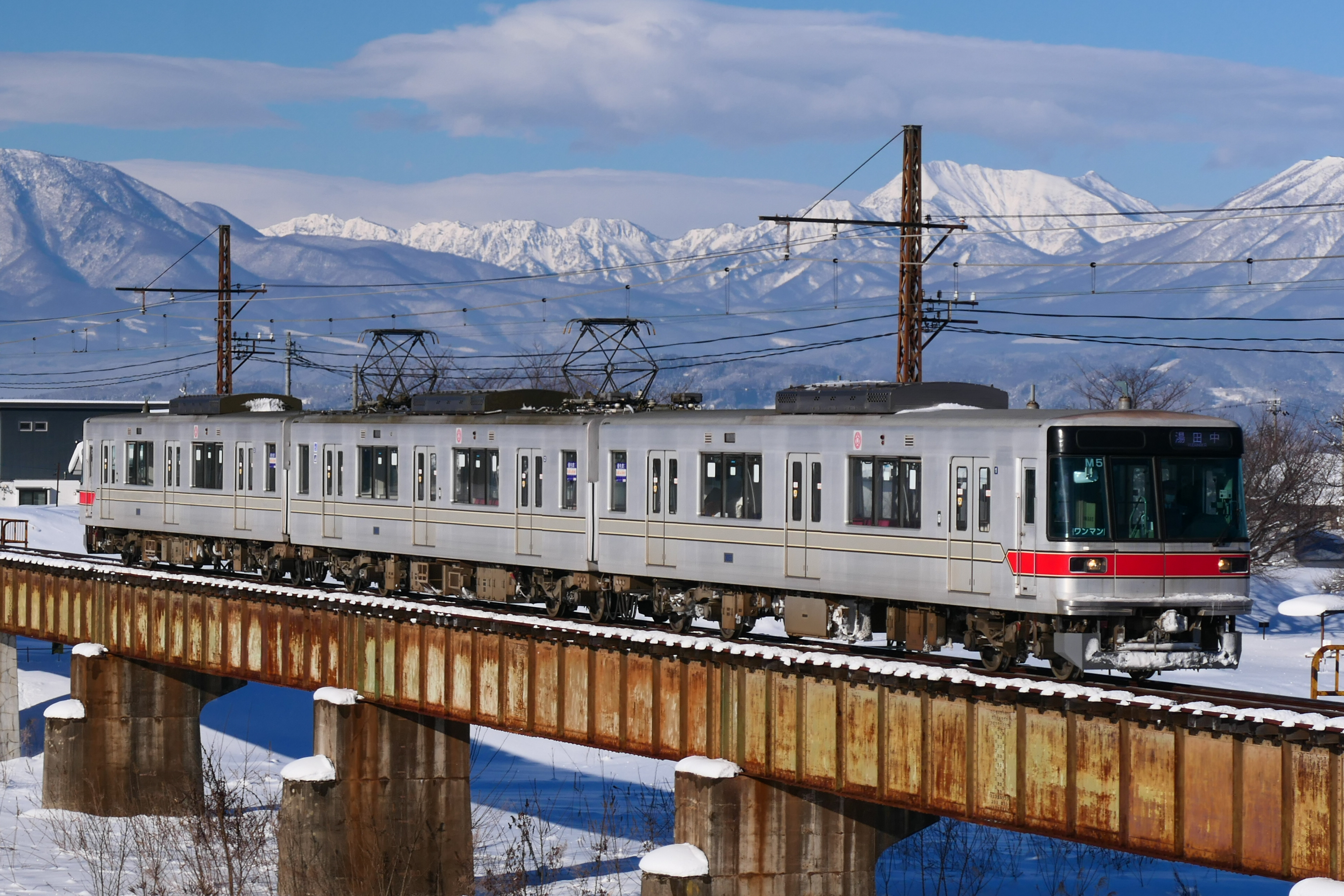
Former 03 series used at Nagano Electric Railway, which redesignated as Nagaden 3000 series

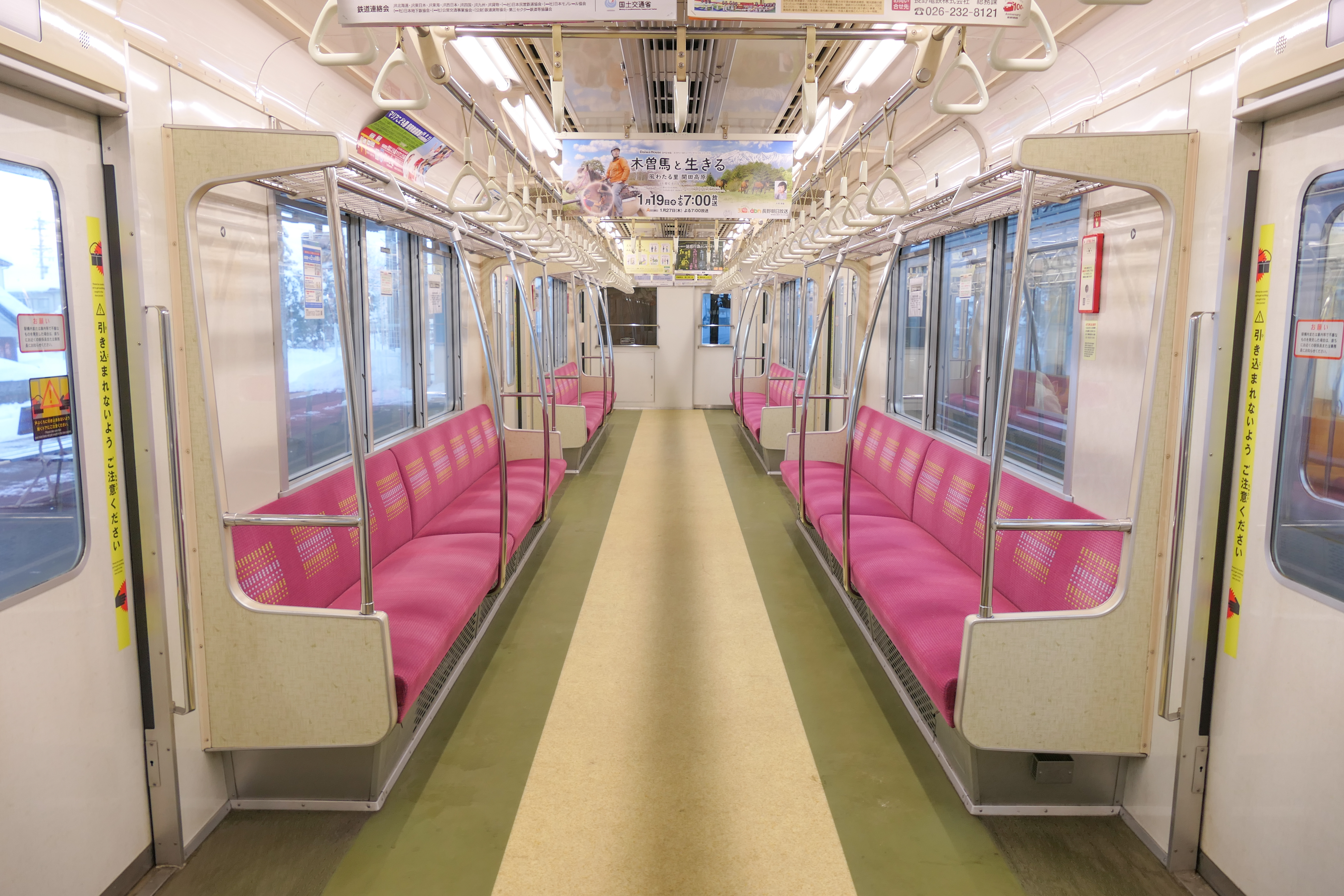
Interior of the Nagaden 3000 series

=== Hokuriku Railway ===
Hokuriku Railway plans to buy a total of five 03 series sets for use on the Asanogawa Line. The first two sets arrived at the railway's depot on 11 January 2020.

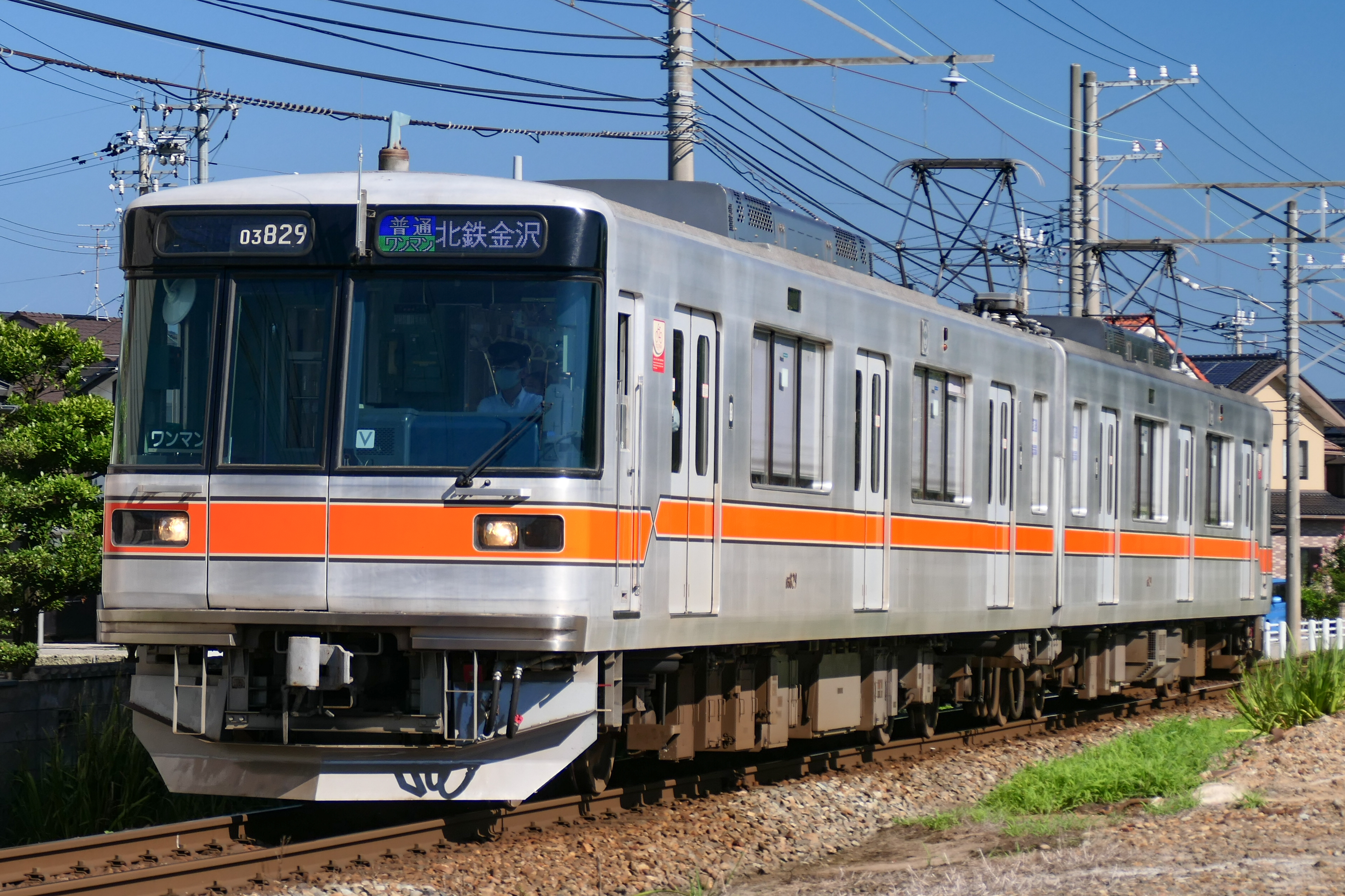
03 series on Hokuriku Railway

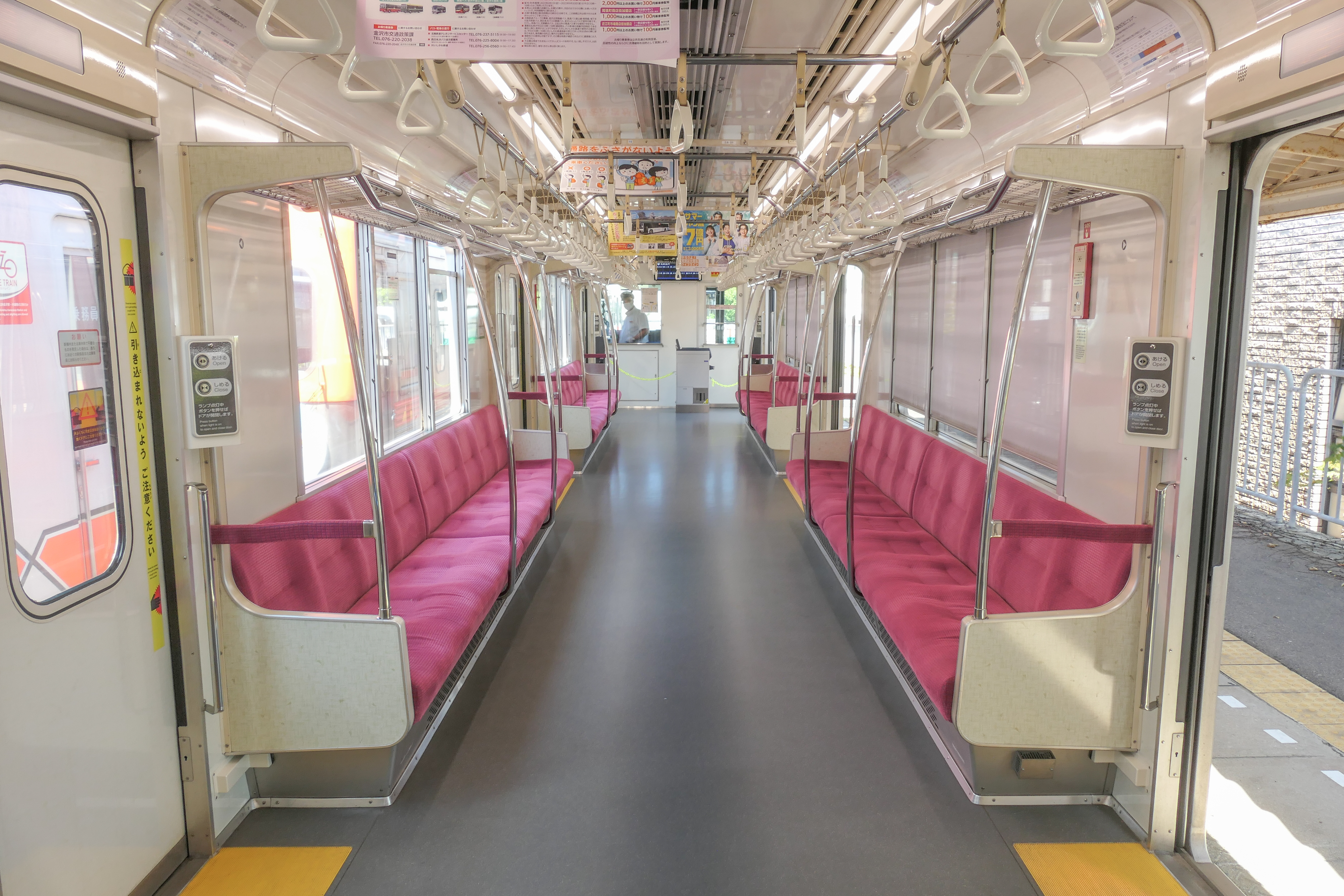
Interior of the Hokuriku Railway 03 series

== Gallery ==
=== Interior ===
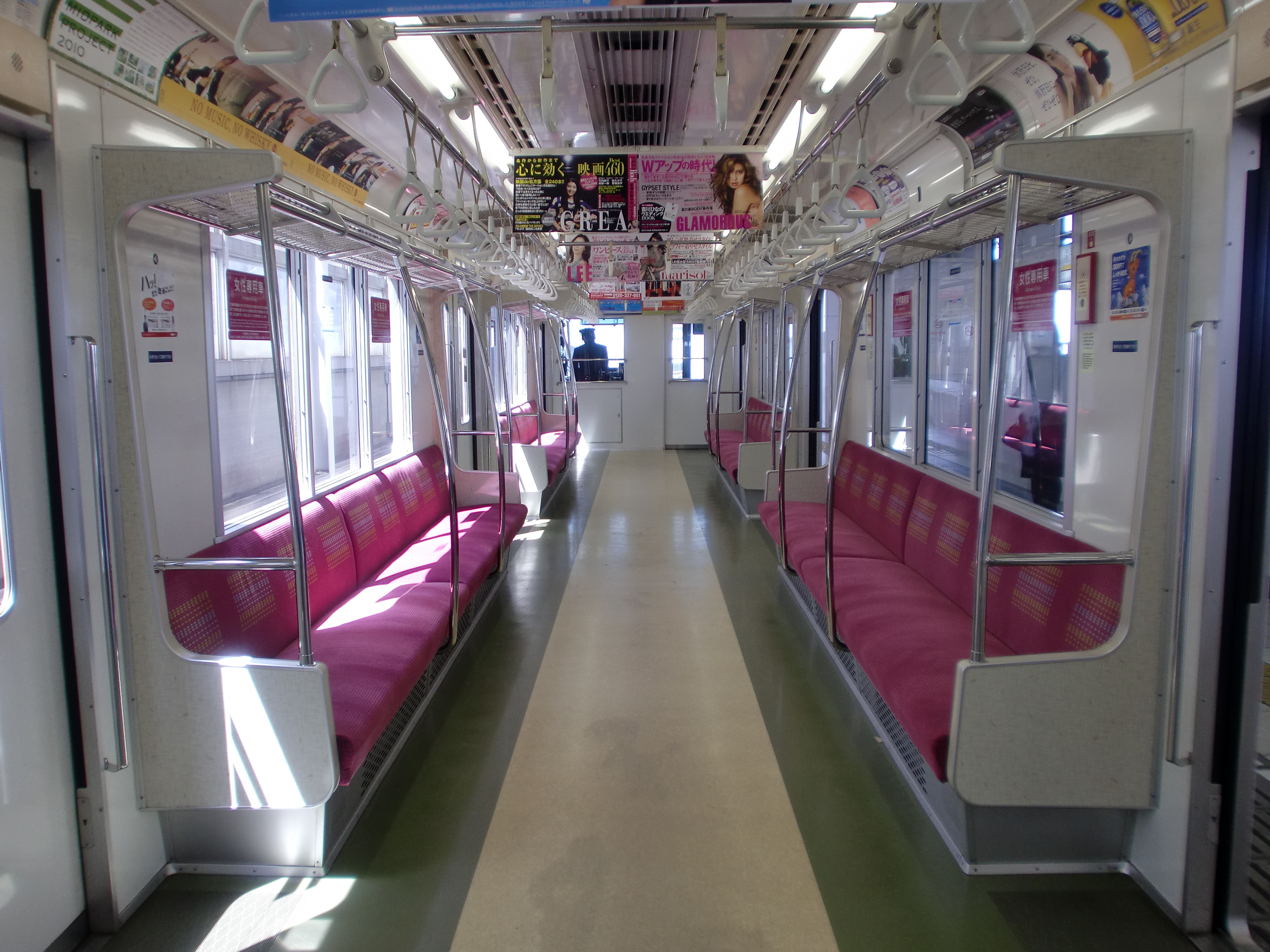
Interior of a 3-door car

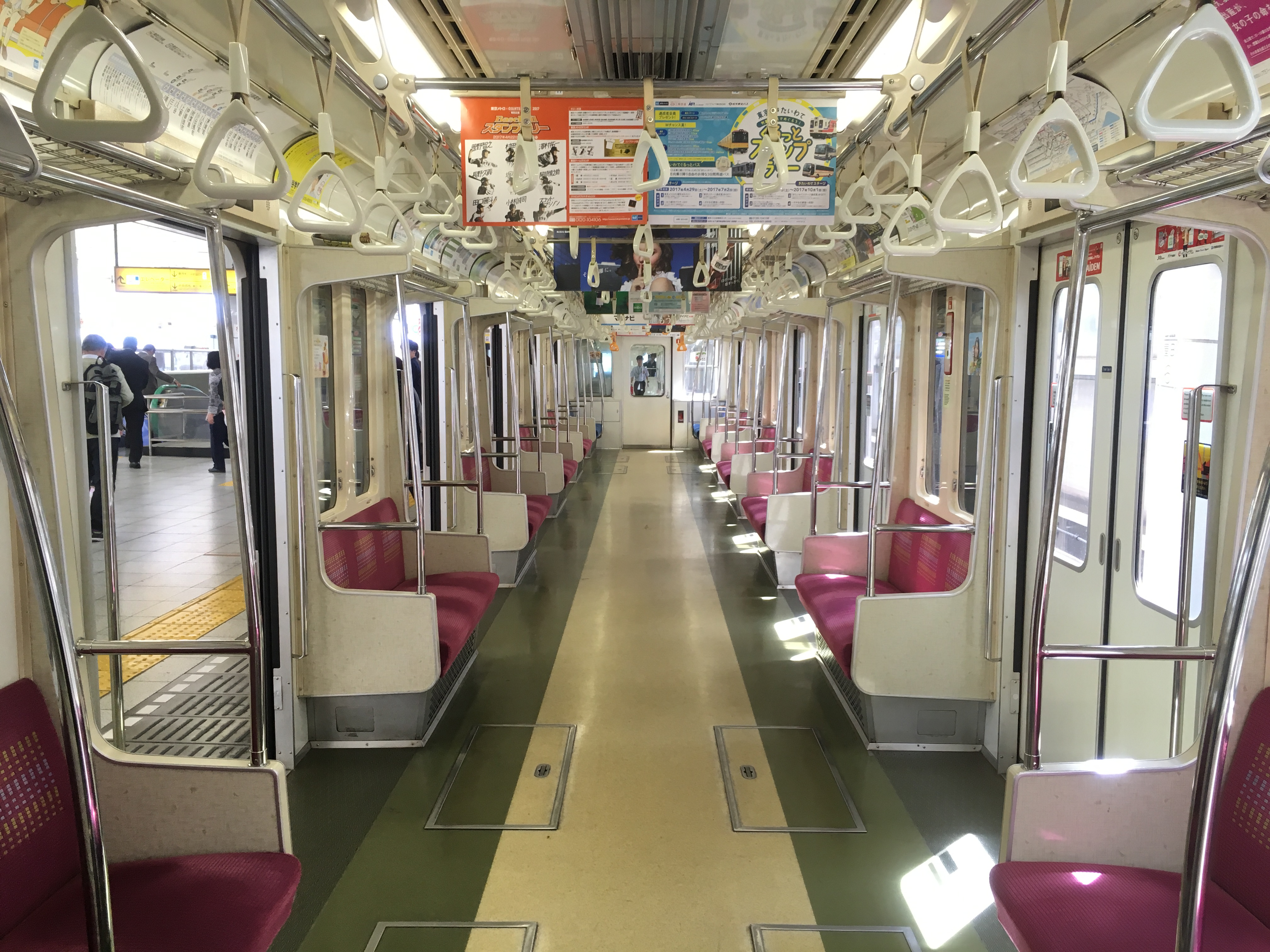
Interior of a 5-door car

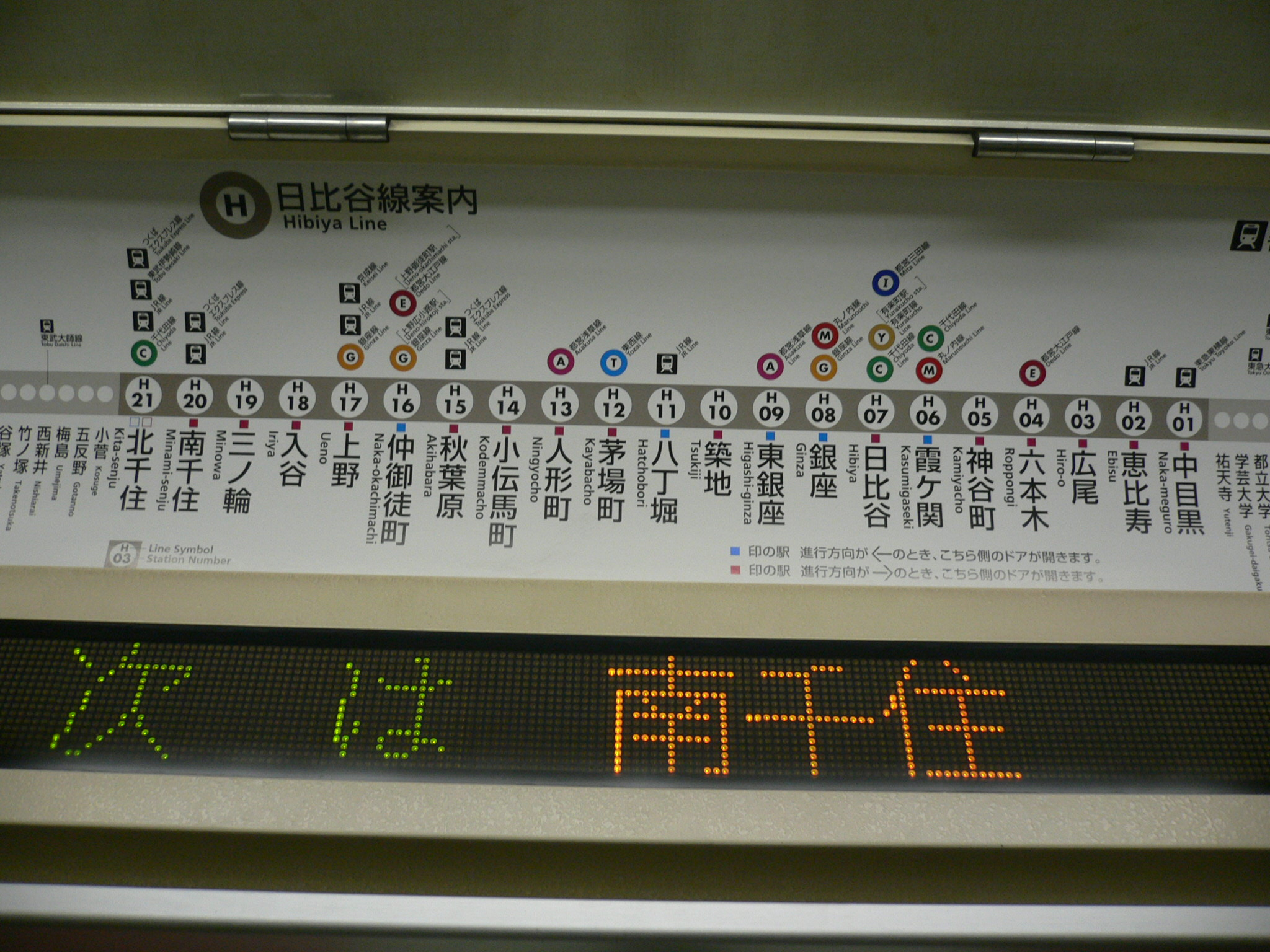
LED display above the passenger doors

=== Underside equipment ===
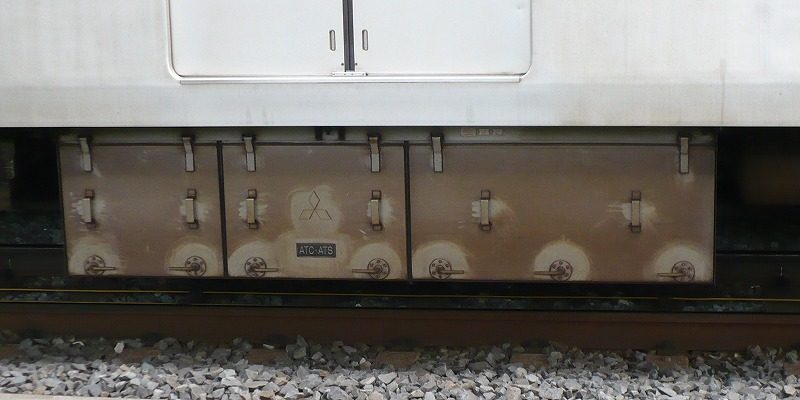
ATC unit of a 03 series

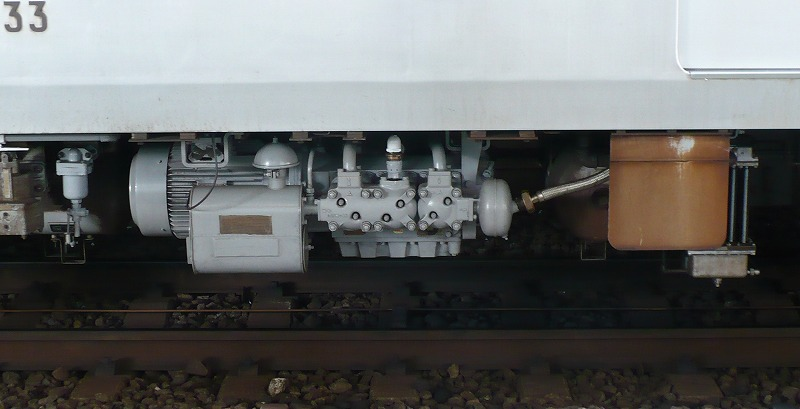
Air compressor

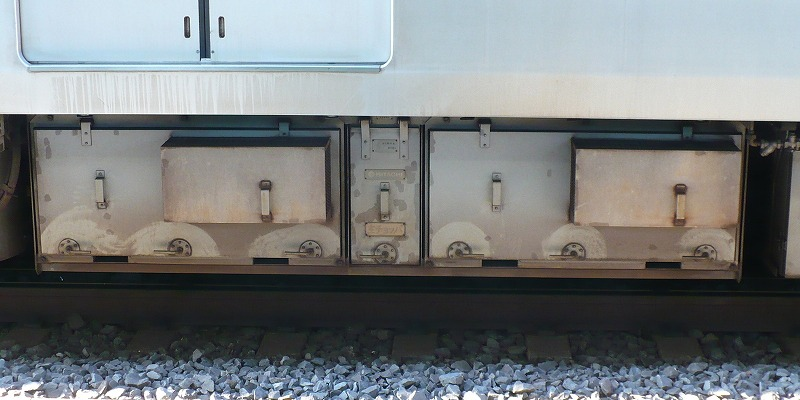
Chopper control for the earlier 03 series sets

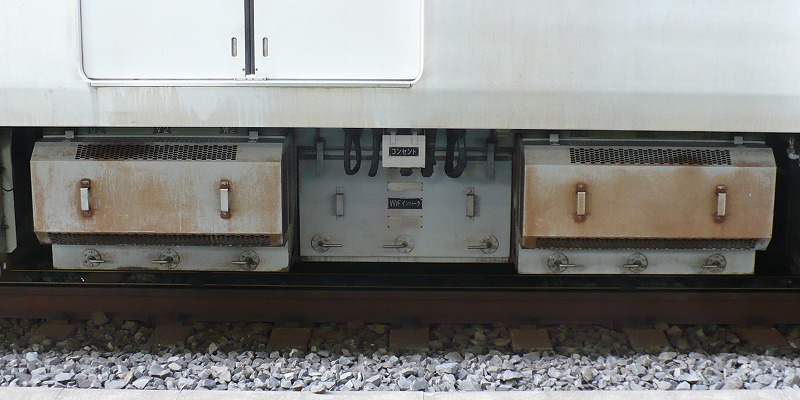
VVVF inverter for the later 03 series sets

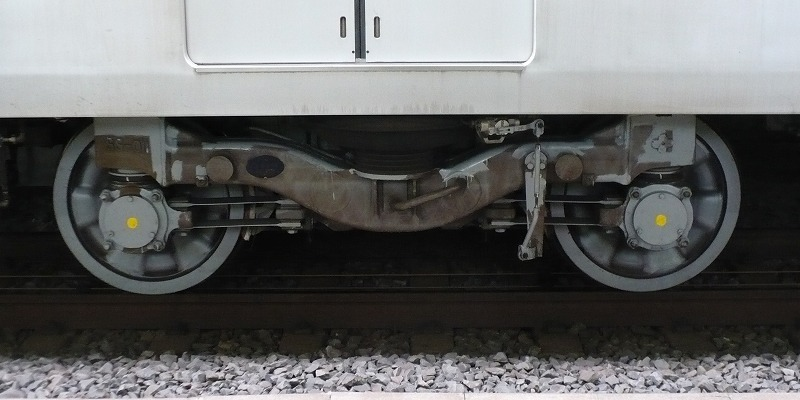
SS011 bogie

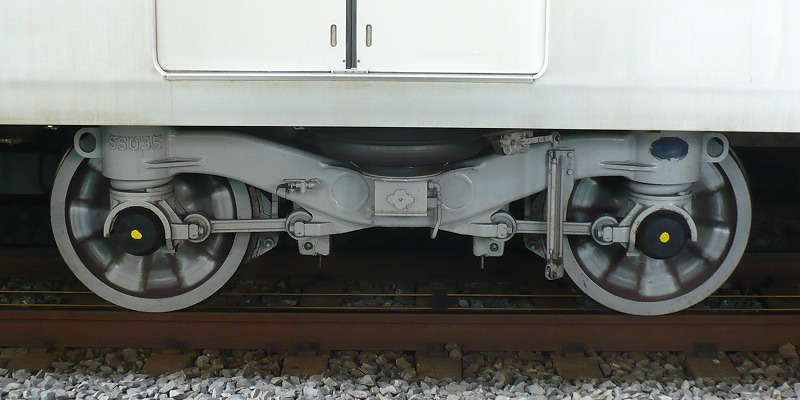
SS035 bogie

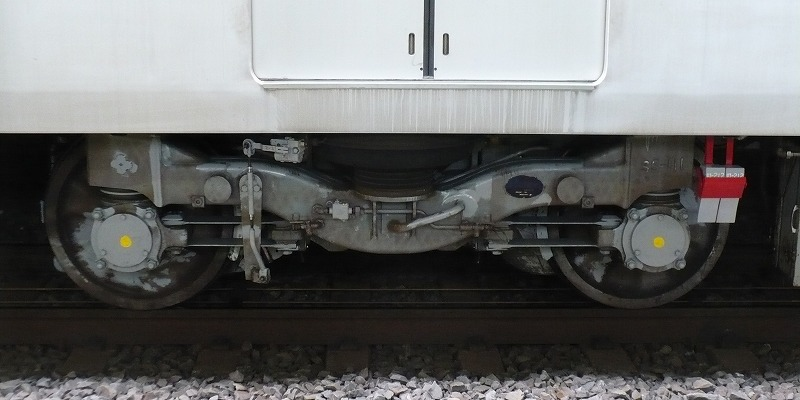
SS111 bogie

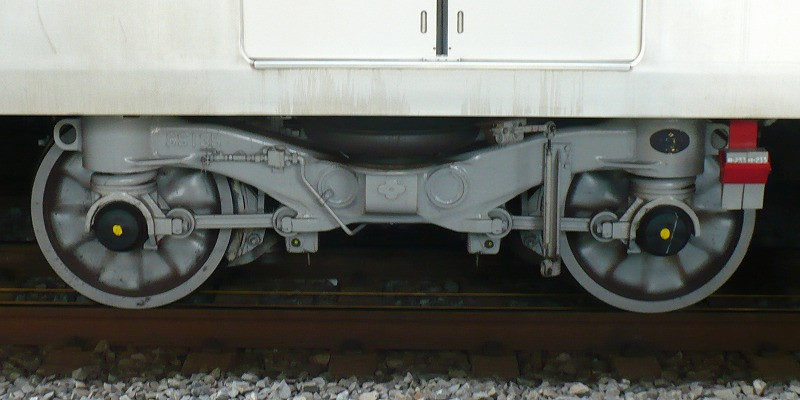
SS135 bogie

== See also ==
- Tokyu 1000 series
- Tobu 20000 series
- Tobu 20050 series
- Tobu 20070 series
