= Tobu 20000 series =

Electric multiple unit train type operated in Japan by Tobu Railway

Tobu 20000/20050/20070/20400 series
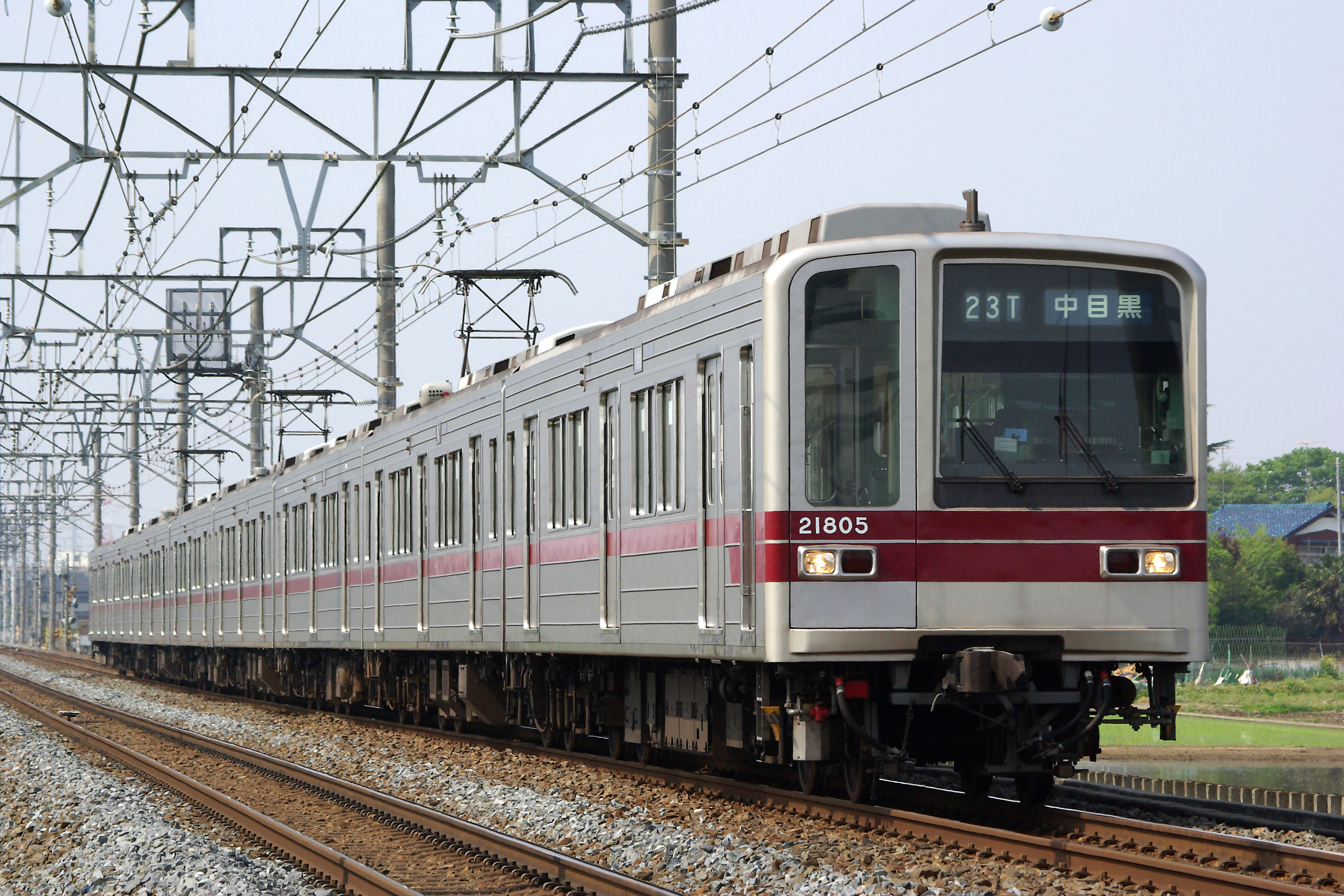
- 20000 series set 21805 in April 2008
- Manufacturers: Alna Kōki, Tokyu Car Corporation
- Built at: Amagasaki, Yokohama
- Replaced: 2000 series; 8000 series (Utsunomiya Line)
- Constructed: 1988–1997
- Entered service: 25 March 1988
- Refurbished: 2018–
- Scrapped: 2017–
- Number built: 192 vehicles (24 sets)
- Number in service: 192 vehicles (24 sets) (as of 1 April 2017)
- Formation: 4/8 cars per trainset
- Operator: Tobu Railway
- Depot: Kasukabe
- Lines served: Tobu Skytree Line; Tobu Nikko Line; Tobu Utsunomiya Line; Tokyo Metro Hibiya Line

Specifications
- Car body construction: Stainless steel
- Car length: 18,000 mm (59 ft 1 in)
- Width: 2,857 mm (9 ft 4.5 in)
- Doors: 3/5 pairs per side
- Maximum speed: 100 km/h (62 mph); 110 km/h (68 mph) (20400 series)
- Traction system: Chopper control (20000 series); Variable frequency (GTO) (20050, 20070 & 20400 series)
- Traction motors: TM-83 (Chopper); TM-92 (GTO-VVVF)
- Acceleration: 3.3 km/(h⋅s) (2.1 mph/s)
- Deceleration: 3.7 km/(h⋅s) (2.3 mph/s) (service); 4.5 km/(h⋅s) (2.8 mph/s) (emergency)
- Electric system: 1,500 V DC overhead line
- Current collection: 20000 series: scissors type pantograph 20070 series: single-arm pantograph 20400 series: single-arm pantograph
- Safety system: Tobu ATS
- Track gauge: 1,067 mm (3 ft 6 in)

The Tobu 20000 series (東武20000系, Tōbu 20000-kei) is a DC electric multiple unit (EMU) commuter train type operated by the private railway operator Tobu Railway in Japan since 1988.

The 20000 series fleet is scheduled to be replaced by new Tobu 70000 series EMUs with 20 m cars.

== Variants ==
- 20000 series: 13 x 8-car sets introduced from March 1988
- 20050 series: 8 x 8-car sets introduced from December 1992 with 5-door cars
- 20070 series: 3 x 8-car sets introduced from March 1997
- 20400 series: 4-car sets introduced from 2018 for the Tobu Utsunomiya Line

== 20000 series ==
A total of 104 vehicles (13 eight-car sets, numbered 21801 to 21813) were built to replace the ageing 2000 series trains on inter-running services between the Tobu Skytree Line and the Tokyo Metro Hibiya Line in Tokyo, entering service on 25 March 1988. The body design uses a new lightweight corrugated stainless steel construction. These trains use the same AFE (Automatic Field Excite) chopper control as the earlier Tobu 9000 series trains and bolsterless bogies.

=== Formation ===
Trains are formed as follows, with six motored ("M") cars and two non-powered driving trailer ("Tc") cars.

Designation	Tc1	M1	M2	M1	M3	M1	M4	Tc2
Numbering	21800	22800	23800	24800	25800	26800	27800	28800

The M1 cars are each fitted with one scissors type pantograph.

== 20050 series ==
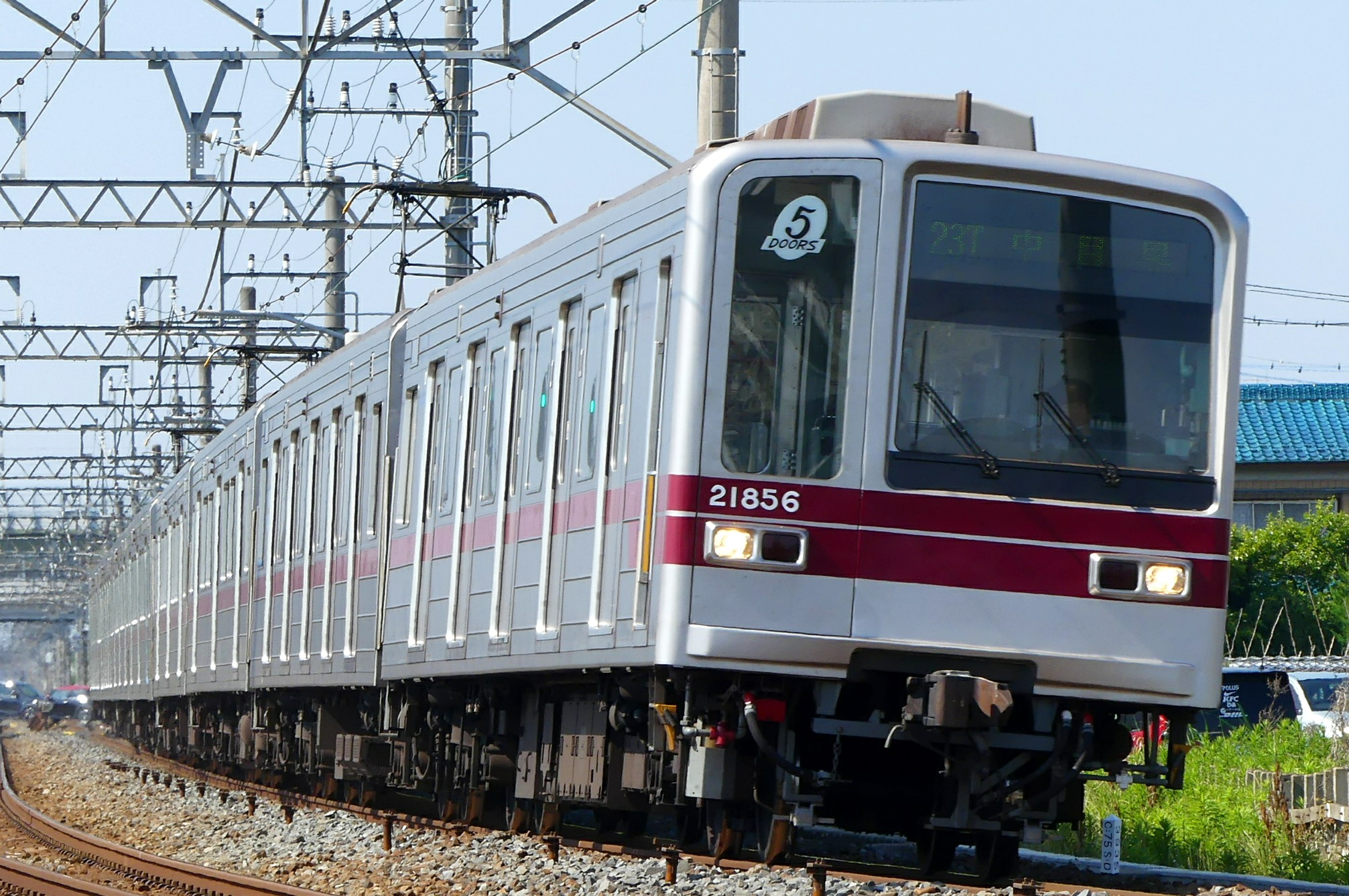
20050 series set 21856 in June 2018

A total of 64 vehicles (8 eight-car sets, numbered 21851 to 21858) were introduced on 29 December 1992 on Tobu Isesaki Line (present-day Tobu Skytree Line) and Tokyo Metro Hibiya Line inter-running services. These sets feature two five-door cars at each end, and also LED destination indicators. These sets have VVVF control.

=== Formation ===
Trains are formed as follows, with six motored ("M") cars and two non-powered driving trailer ("Tc") cars.

Designation	Tc3	M5	M2	M7	M3	M7	M6	Tc4
Numbering	21850	22850	23850	24850	25850	26850	27850	28850

The M5 and M7 cars are each fitted with one scissors type pantograph.

=== Interior ===
Passenger accommodation consists of longitudinal bench seating throughout, with seats for three persons between each pair of doors in the five-door cars. Seat width is 440 mm (17 in) per person for the three-person bench seats in five-door cars and 450 mm (18 in) per person for the ten-person bench seats in three-door cars. As with the 9050 series EMUs introduced around the same time, these sets featured LCD passenger information screens above the doorways, but these were subsequently removed.

== 20070 series ==
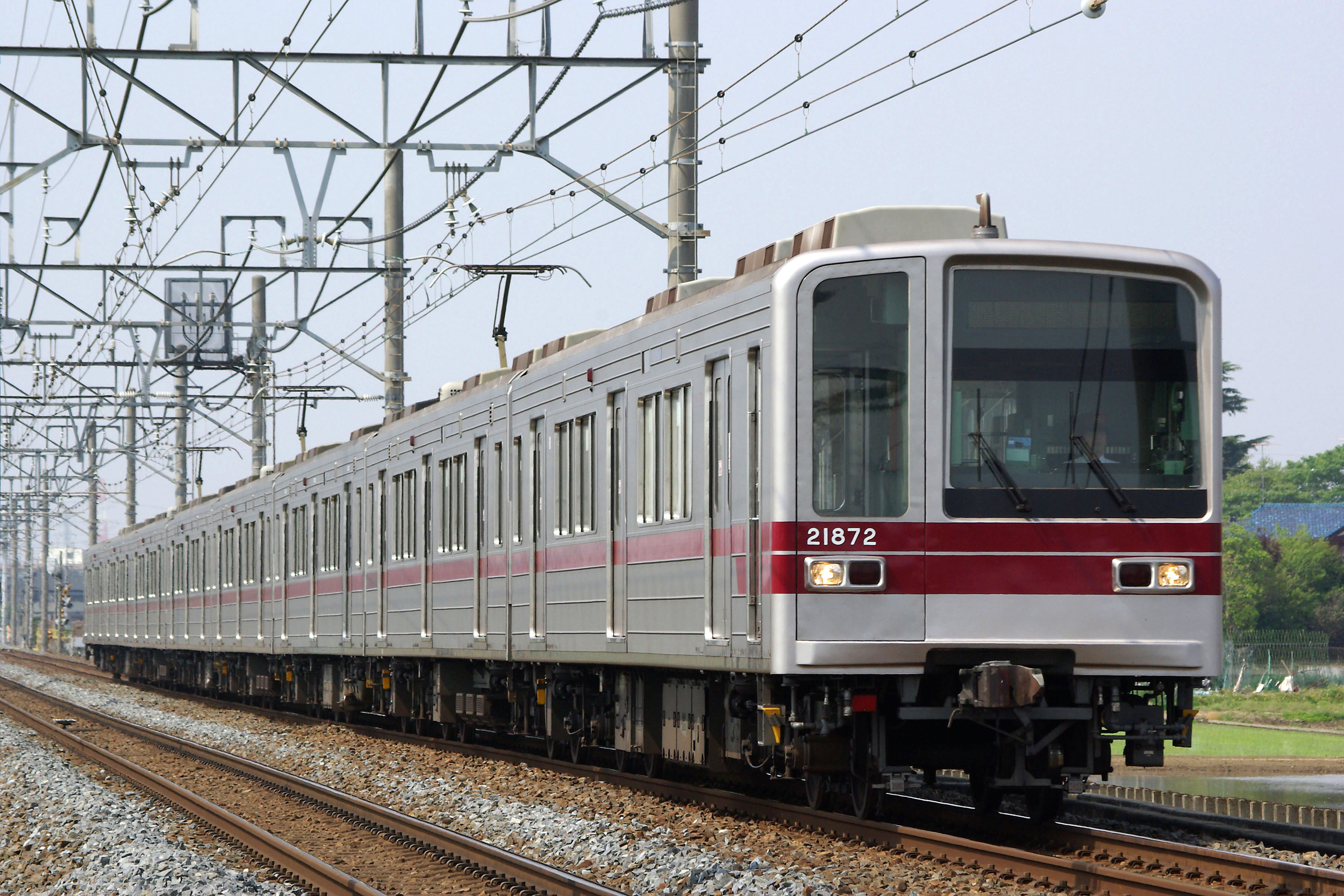
20070 series set 21872 in April 2008

These are eight-car sets that were introduced from 25 March 1997 to cope with an increased service frequency, of which 24 vehicles (three eight-car sets, numbered 21871 to 21873) were built. These sets feature three-door cars throughout, and also LED destination indicators. These sets have VVVF control.

=== Formation ===
Trains are formed as follows, with six motored ("M") cars and two non-powered driving trailer ("Tc") cars.

Designation	Tc1	M1	M2	M3	M4	M3	M5	Tc2
Numbering	21870	22870	23870	24870	25870	26870	27870	28870

The M1 and M3 cars are each fitted with one single-arm pantograph.

=== Interior ===
Passenger accommodation consists of longitudinal bench seating throughout. These sets feature three-colour LED passenger information displays above alternate doorways.

== 20400 series ==
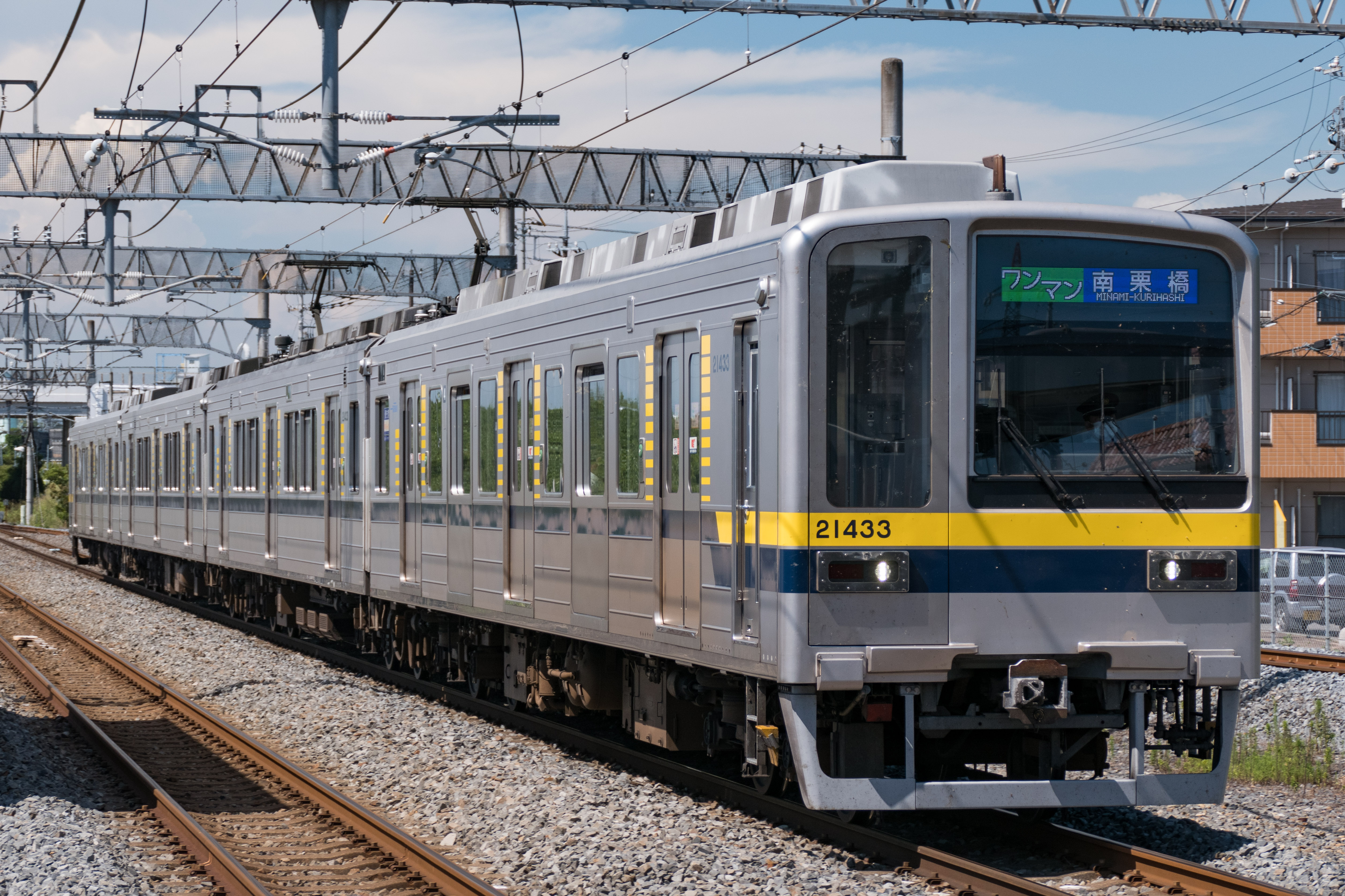
Set 21433 in August 2021

The 20400 series are four-car sets for Tobu Nikko Line and Utsunomiya Line operation north of Minami-Kurihashi Station. The first trains entered revenue service on 3 September 2018.

=== Formation ===
Trains are formed as follows, with two motored cars and two non-powered trailer cars. Car 1 ("Tc2") and 4 ("Tc1") are former 20000 series cars built by Alna Koki in 1988, and cars 2 ("M2") and 3 ("M1") are former 20070 series cars built by Tokyu Car in 1997. Some sets will incorporate former 20050 series cars, which will be converted from five doors to three doors per side.

Designation	Tc2	M2	M1	Tc1
Numbering	24400	23400	22400	21400

The M1 car is fitted with two single-arm pantographs.

=== Interior ===
Passenger accommodation consists of longitudinal bench seating throughout. The interior is based on the 70000 series design.

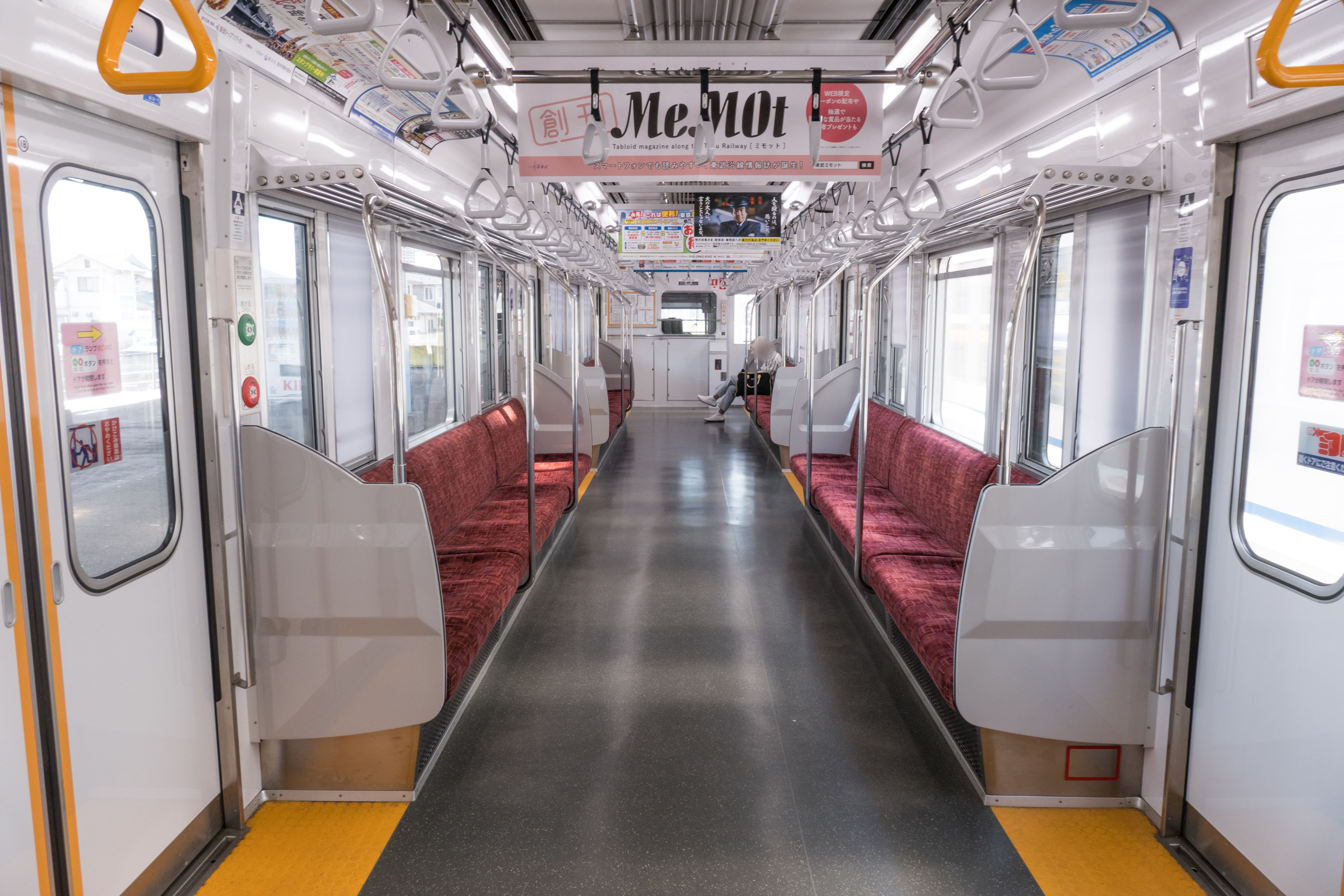
General interior view, July 2021

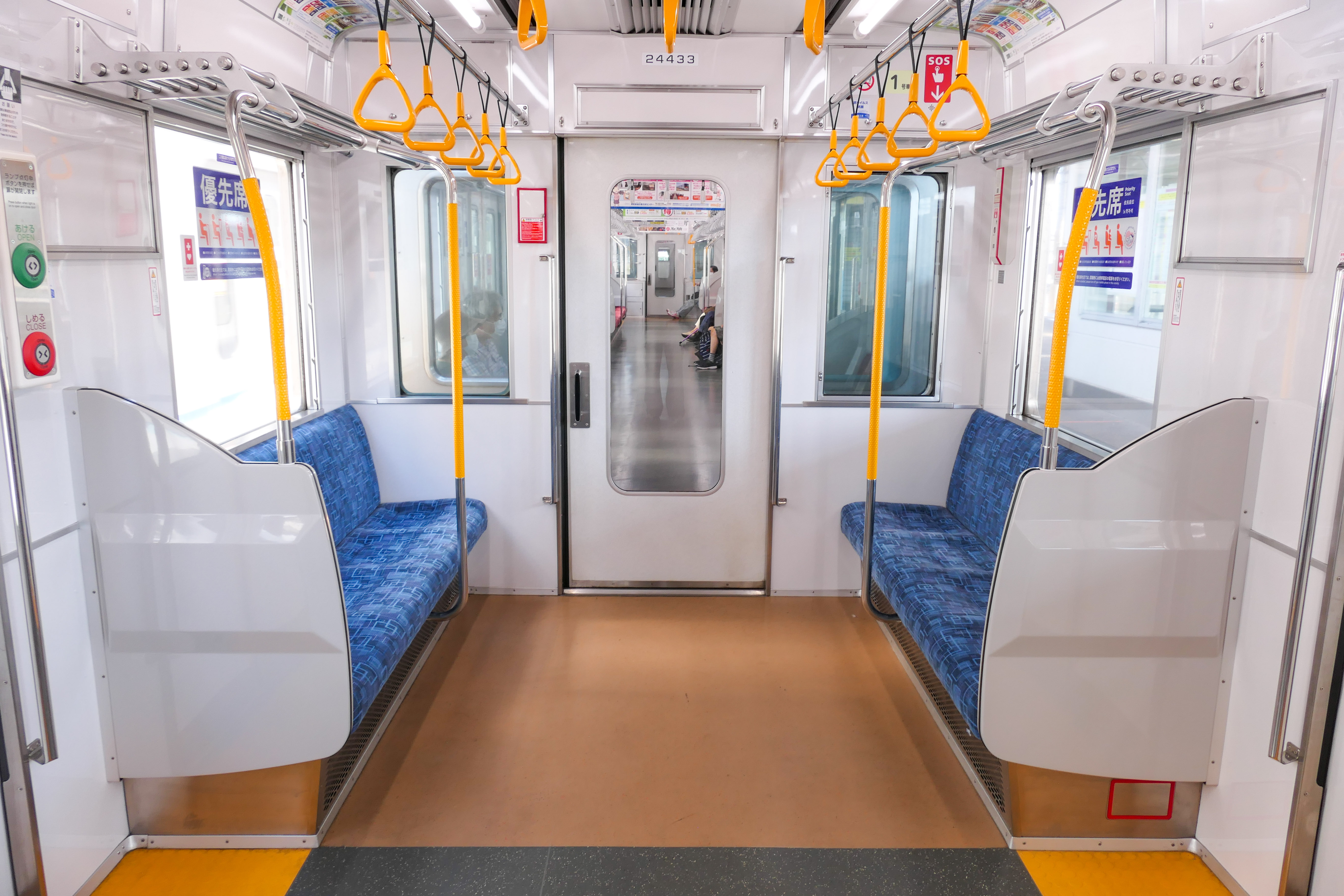
Priority seating, July 2021

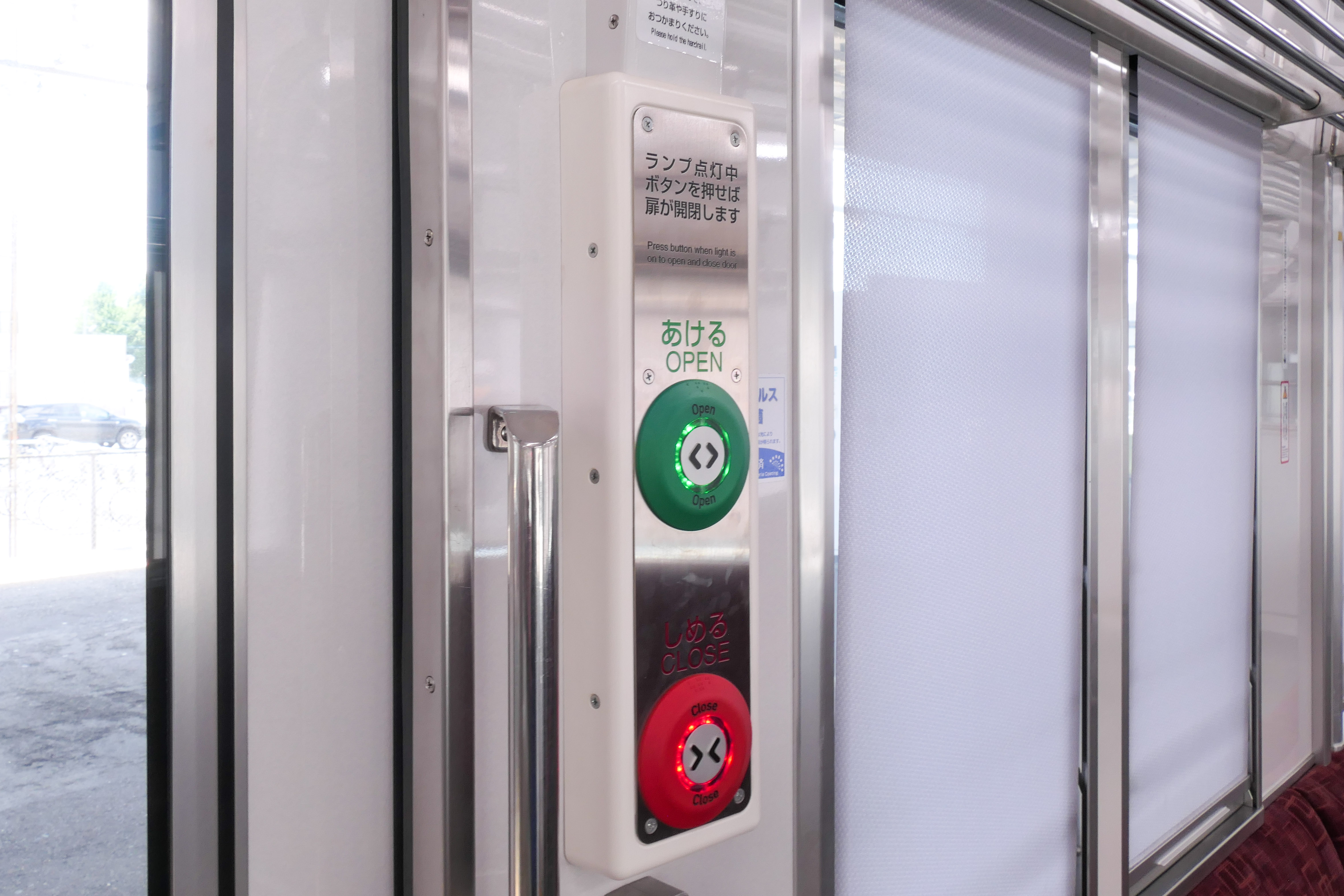
Passenger door buttons, July 2021

== Withdrawal and refurbishment ==
The 20000 series trains began to be replaced by new 70000 series trains from 7 July 2017. The first sets to be withdrawn, sets 21813 and 21809, were removed for scrapping in July 2017. Some of the 20000 series trains are also refurbished as 20400 series to replace 8000 series trains.

The five-door 20000 series trains are being withdrawn so that platform doors can be installed on Tokyo Metro Hibiya Line stations.

=== Transferred vehicles ===
20000 series cars have been transferred to Alpico Kotsu for use on the Kamikōchi Line, with rebuilt cab ends, where they have replaced life-expired former Keio 3000 series trains.

== Livery changes ==
On 15 June 2023, Tobu announced that a 20400 series set would be given a "Berry Happy Train" livery to commemorate the Tochigi Prefecture's 150th anniversary, and it bore the livery until June 2024. On 19 January 2025, Tobu announced that another 20400 series set would be given a "Berry² Happy Train" livery as a revamp of the previous one, and it bore the livery until June 2026. On 26 July 2026, Tobu announced that a third 20400 series set would be given a "Strawberry Kingdom Berry Lucky Train" as another iteration of the series. It is scheduled to bear this livery until June 2029.
