= Tobu 70000 series =

Japanese electric multiple unit train type

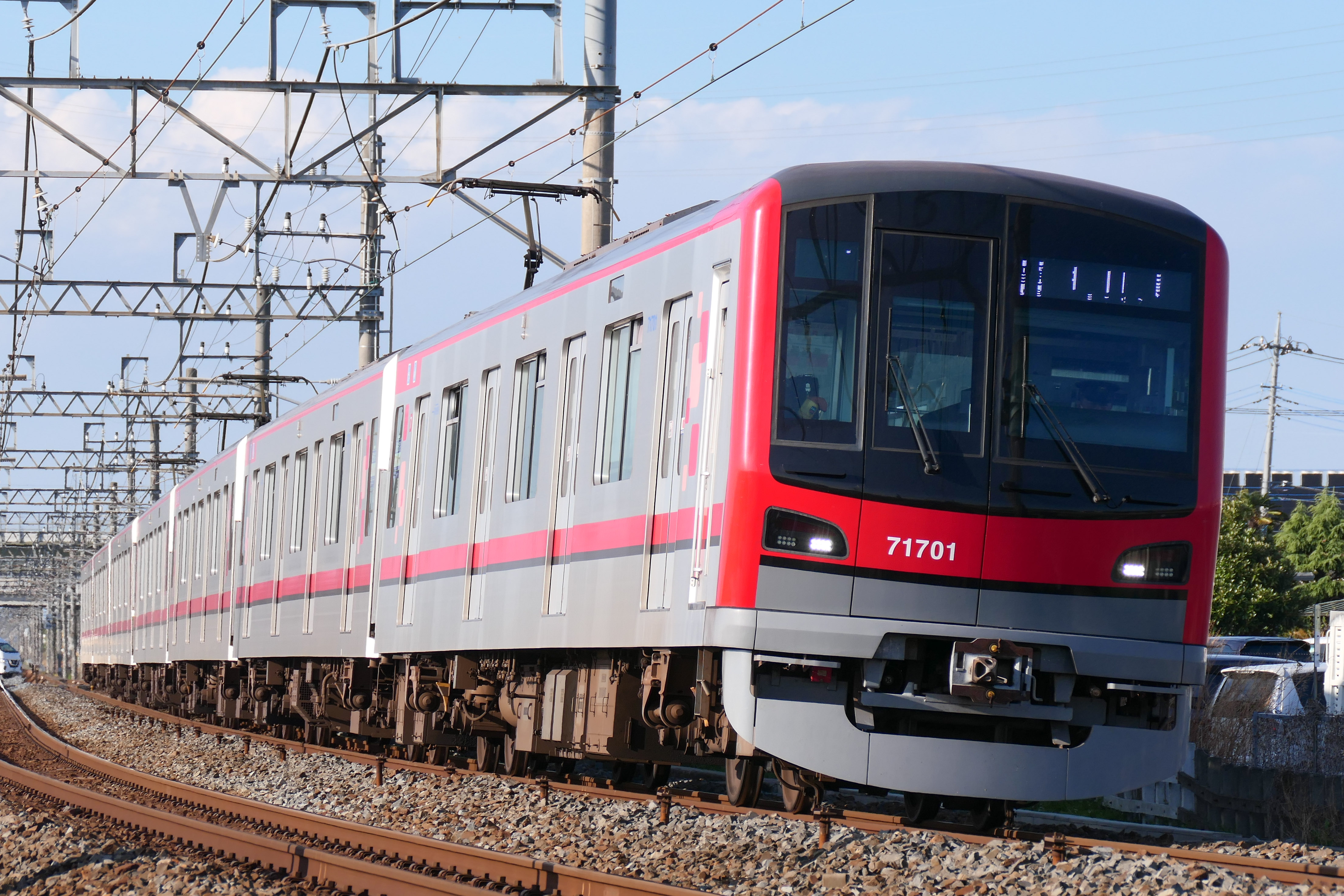
- 70000 series set 71701 in April 2021

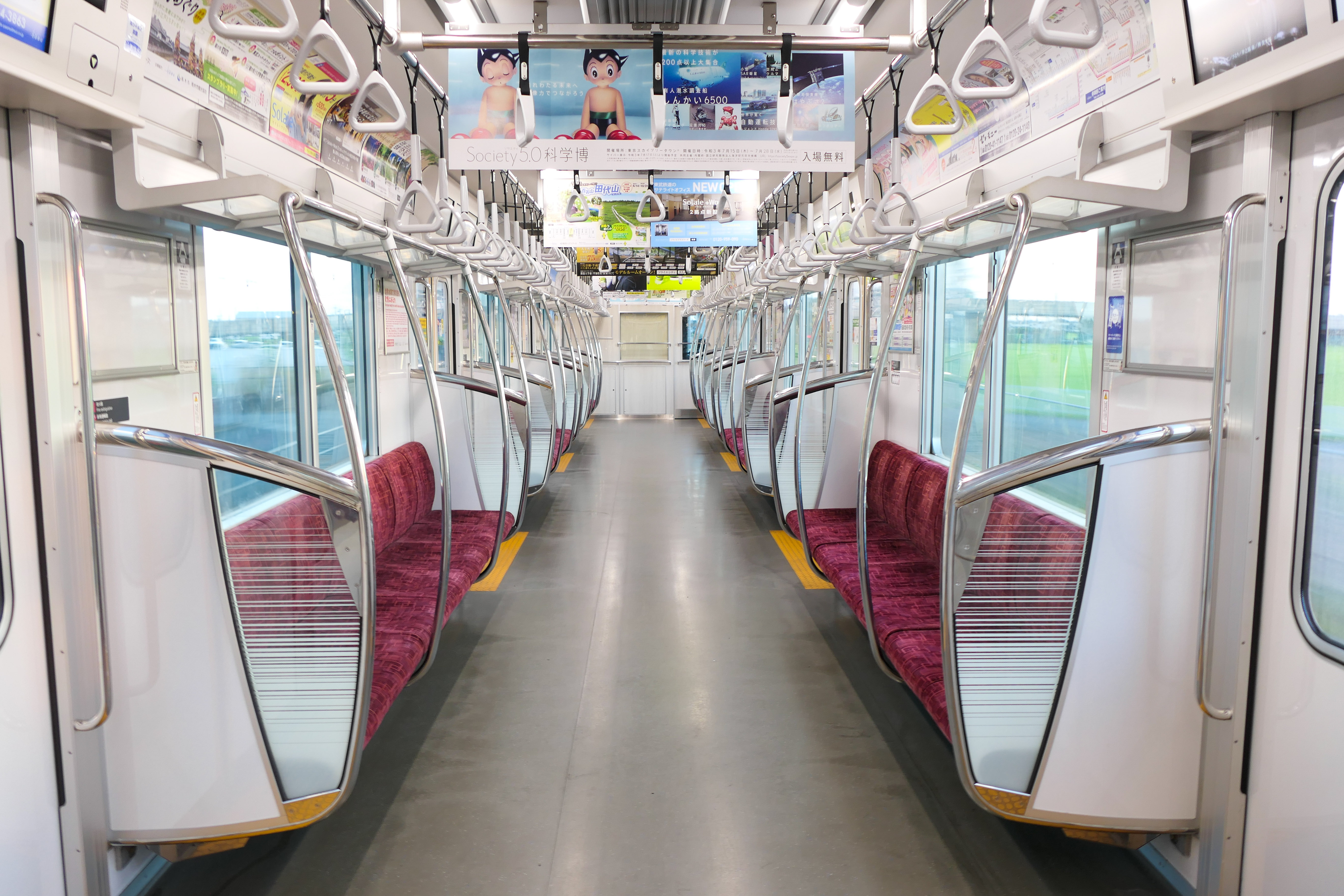
- The interior of the 70000 series
- In service: 2017–present
- Manufacturer: Kinki Sharyo
- Built at: Higashiōsaka, Osaka
- Replaced: 20000 series
- Constructed: 2017–2020
- Entered service: 7 July 2017
- Number built: 70000 series: 126 vehicles (18 sets) (as of March 2020); 70090 series: 42 vehicles (6 sets)
- Formation: 7 cars per trainset Mc1-M1-M2-M3-M2'-M1'-Mc2
- Fleet numbers: 70000 series: 71701-71718; 70090 series: 71791-71796
- Operator: Tobu Railway
- Depot: Kasukabe
- Lines served: Isesaki Line (70090 series only); Tobu Skytree Line; Hibiya Line

Specifications
- Car body construction: Aluminium alloy
- Train length: 140.94 m (462 ft 5 in)
- Car length: 20,470 mm (67 ft 2 in) (end cars); 20,000 mm (65 ft 7 in) (intermediate cars)
- Width: 2,780 mm (9 ft 1 in)
- Height: 3,972 mm (13 ft 0.4 in)
- Doors: 4 pairs per side
- Maximum speed: 110 km/h (68 mph)
- Weight: 236.3 t (232.6 long tons; 260.5 short tons)
- Traction system: Mitsubishi 2-level VVVF (Si-IGBT switching device)
- Traction motors: TM-17 permanent-magnet synchronous motor
- Power output: 2,870 kW (205 kW x 2 per car)
- Acceleration: 3.3 km/(h⋅s) (2.1 mph/s)
- Deceleration: 3.7 km/(h⋅s) (2.3 mph/s) (service); 4.5 km/(h⋅s) (2.8 mph/s) (emergency)
- Electric systems: 1,500 V DC (overhead catenary)
- Current collection: Pantograph
- Bogies: TRS-17M bolsterless
- Safety systems: TSP-ATS, CS-ATC
- Track gauge: 1,067 mm (3 ft 6 in)

The Tobu 70000 series (東武70000系, Tōbu 70000-kei) is a Japanese DC electric multiple unit (EMU) commuter train type operated by the private railway operator Tobu Railway on Tobu Skytree Line and Tokyo Metro Hibiya Line inter-running services since 7 July 2017.

== Variants ==
- 70000 series: sets for use on Tokyo Metro Hibiya Line through services
- 70090 series: sets for use on TH Liner reserved-seat services

== 70000 series ==
=== Overview ===
The 70000 series trains are scheduled to replace the 20000 series EMUs used on Tobu Skytree Line and Tokyo Metro Hibiya Line inter-running services. Due to the effective length of the new trains which have 20 m (65 ft 7 in) long cars instead of the 18 m (59 ft 1 in) long cars of the 20000 series, the trains were formed of seven cars instead of eight cars to cope with Hibiya Line platform lengths, resulting in about a 1% reduction in capacity. A unified door arrangement with four pairs per side instead of the mixture of three and five pairs per side on the 20000 series trains allows the installation of platform edge doors on the Tokyo Metro Hibiya Line once the older train fleets have been replaced. The trains use permanent-magnet synchronous motors (PMSM), offering 25% energy savings compared to the motors used in earlier 20000 series trains.

=== Formation ===
The 70000 series trains are formed as seven-car sets as shown below, with car 1 at the northern end. Each car is motored, with only the outer axle on each bogie motored.

Car No.	1	2	3	4	5	6	7
Designation	Mc2	M1'	M2'	M3	M2	M1	Mc1
Numbering	777xx	767xx	757xx	747xx	737xx	727xx	717xx
Weight (t)	34.5	33.1	33.2	35.1	32.9	33.2	34.3
Capacity (total/seated)	140/45	151/51	151/51	151/51	151/51	151/51	140/45

Car 4 has two single-arm pantographs, and cars 2 and 6 each have one.

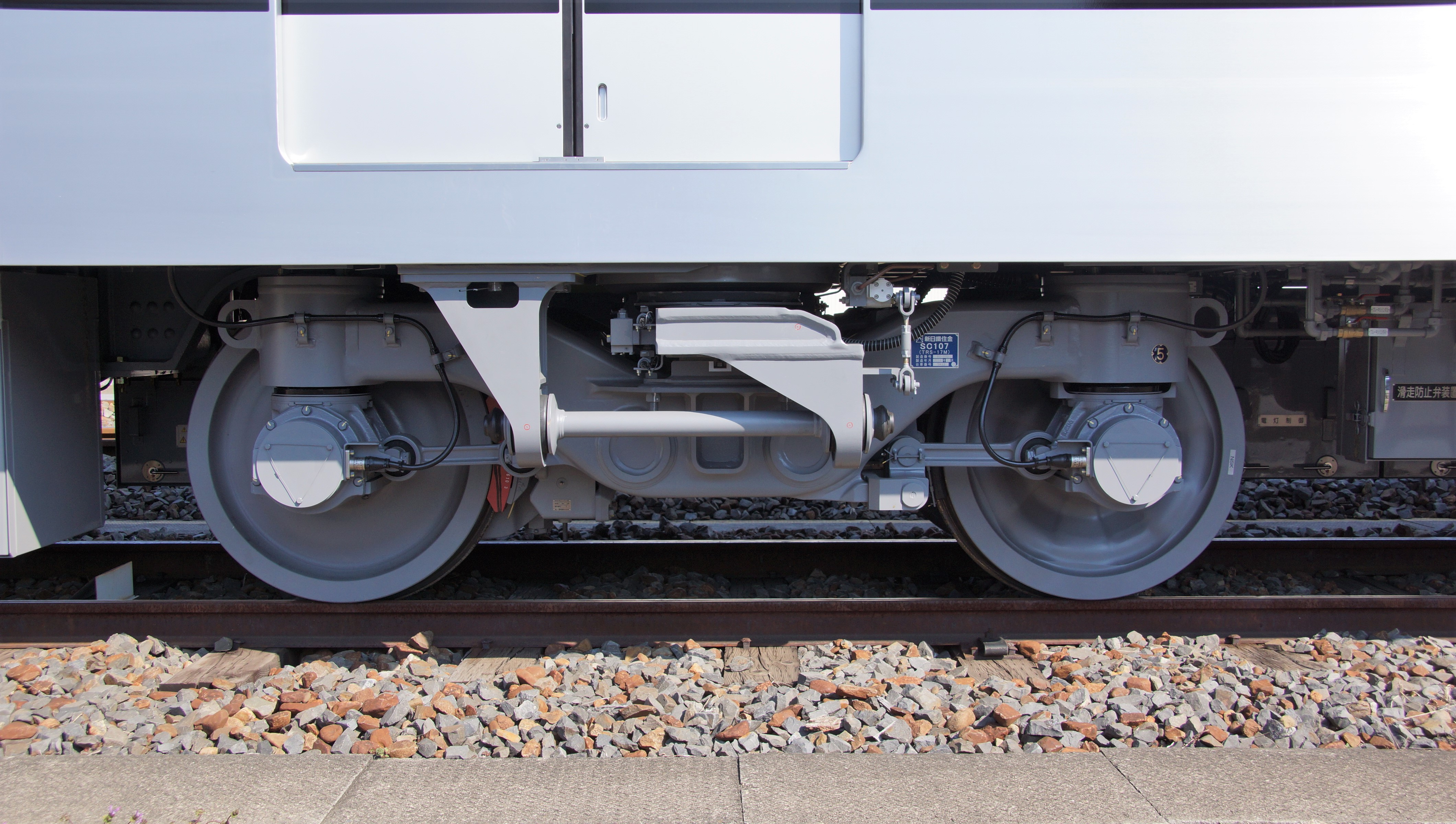
A TRS-17M motor bogie

=== Interior ===
Internally, the trains use LED lighting throughout. Three 17-inch LCD passenger information displays are provided above each doorway. Seating consists of longitudinal bench seats throughout, with a seat width of 460 mm (18.1 in) per person (compared to 450 mm (17.7 in) per person for the 20000 series). Wheelchair spaces are provided at one end of each car.

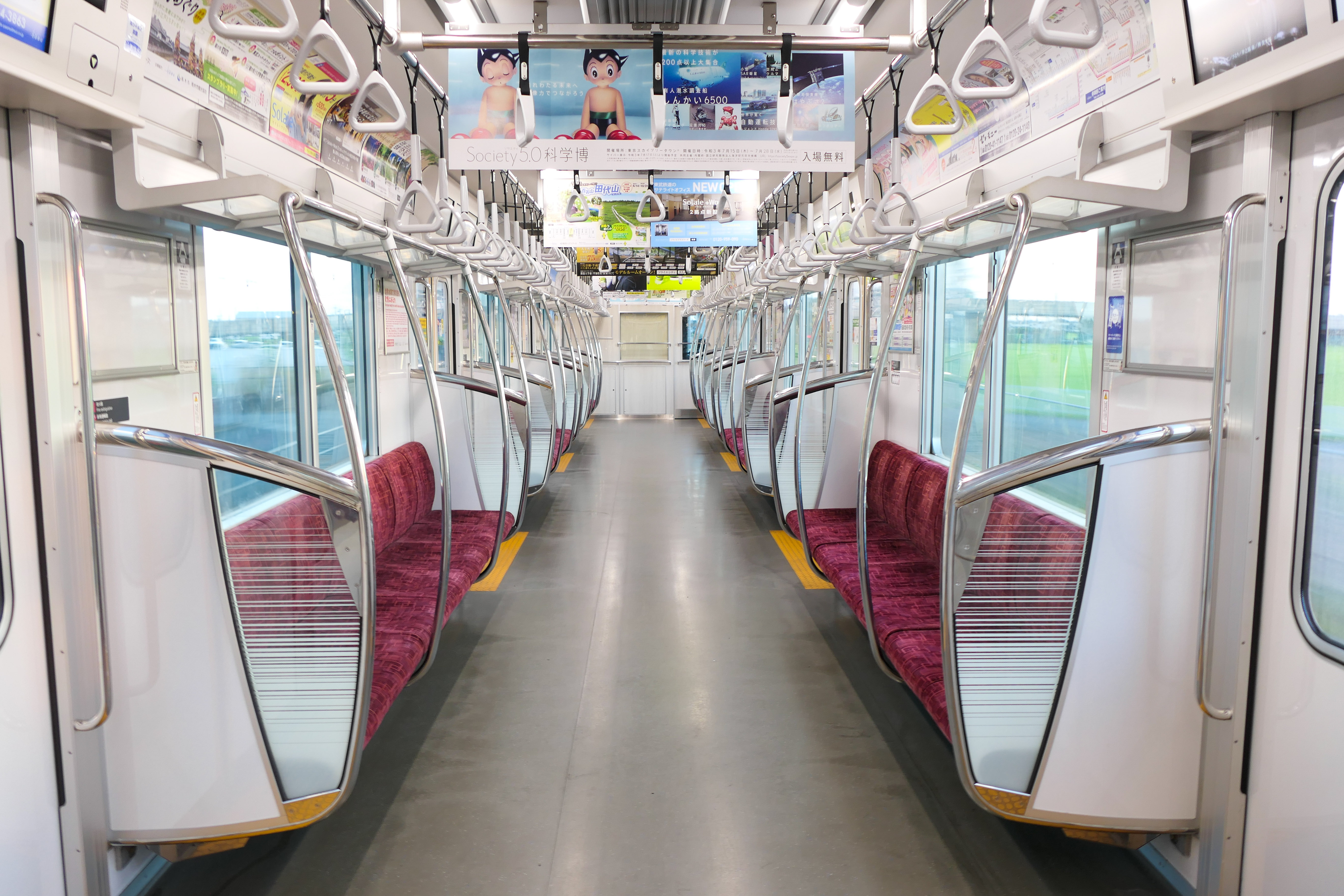
General interior view

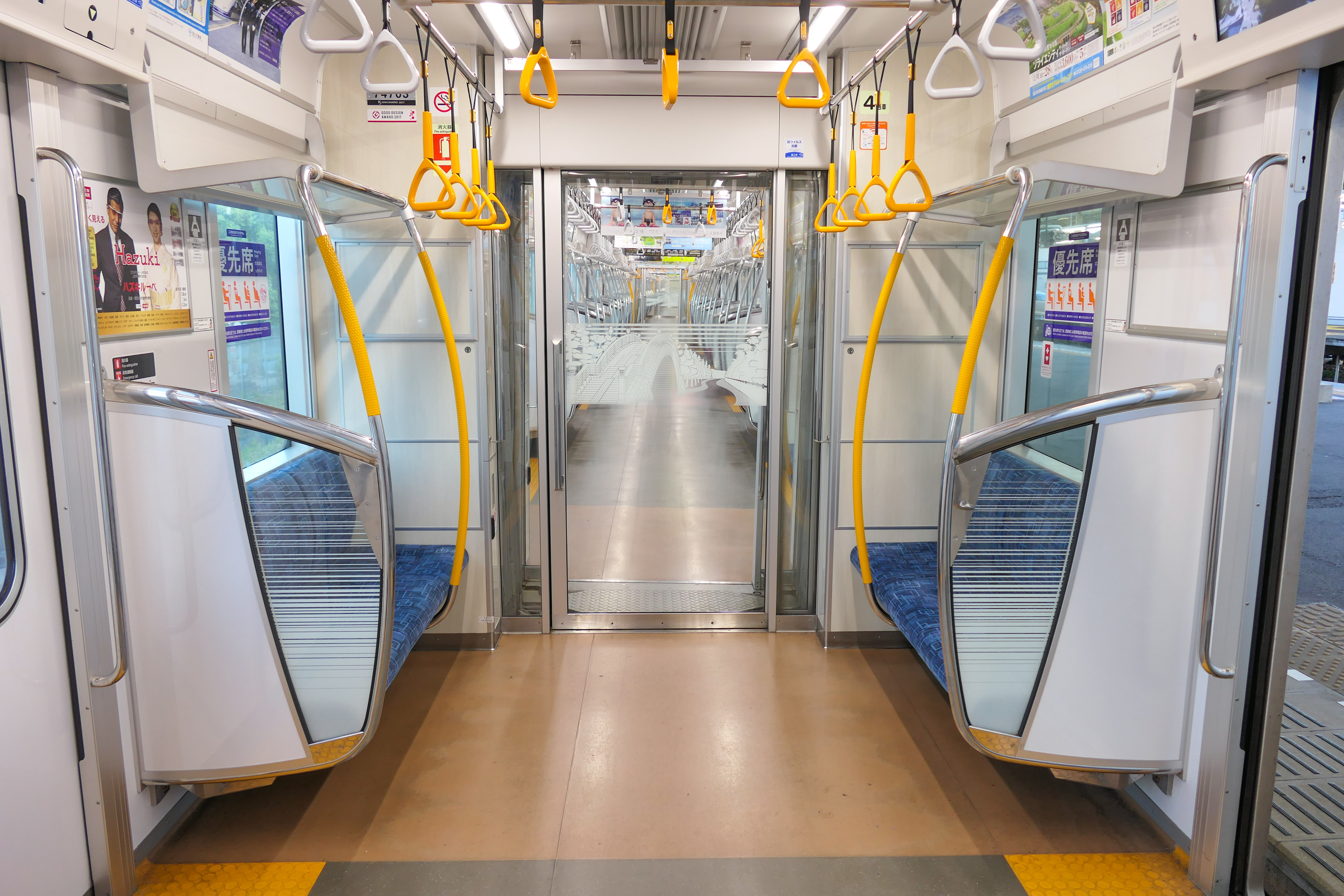
Priority seating

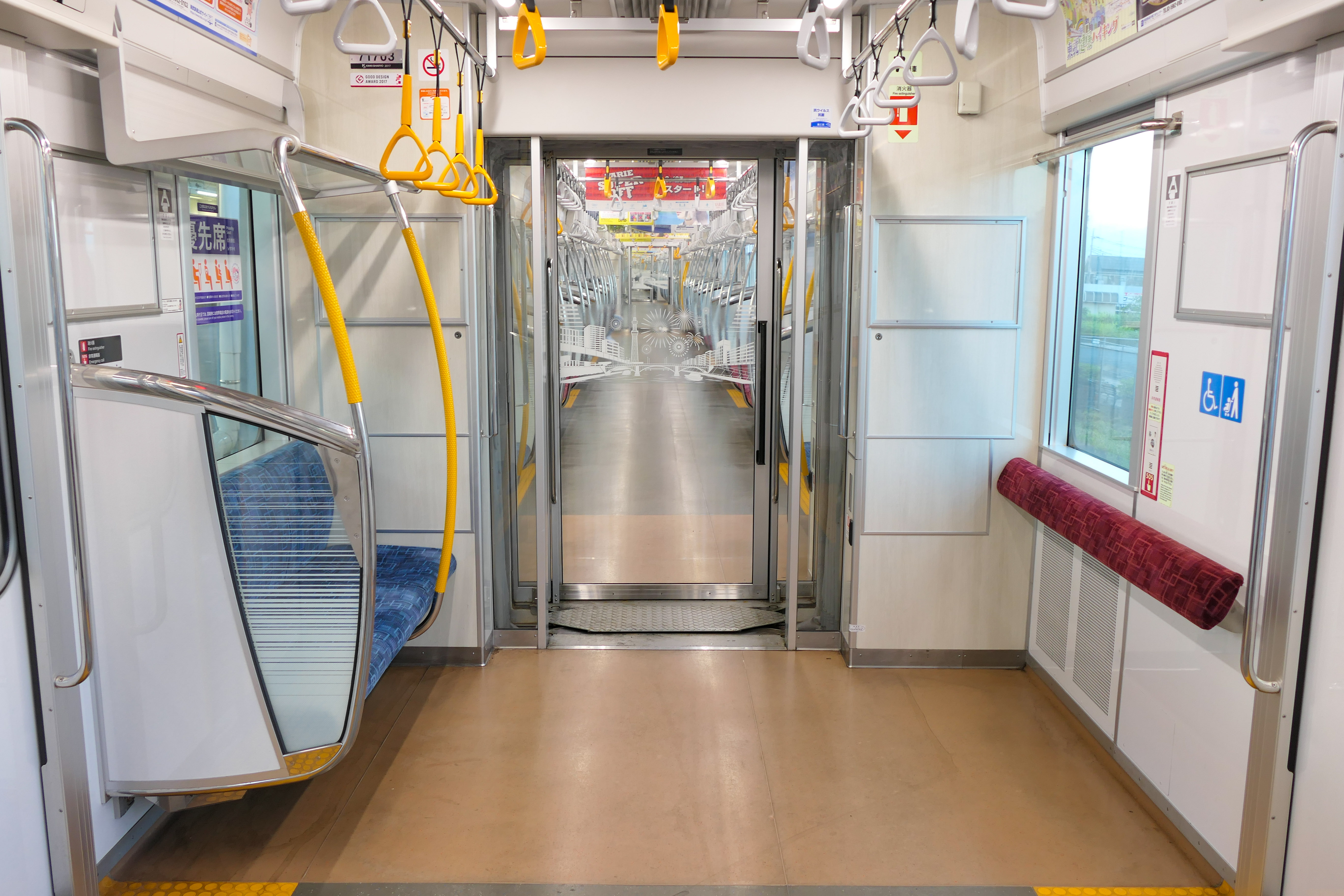
Priority seating with wheelchair space

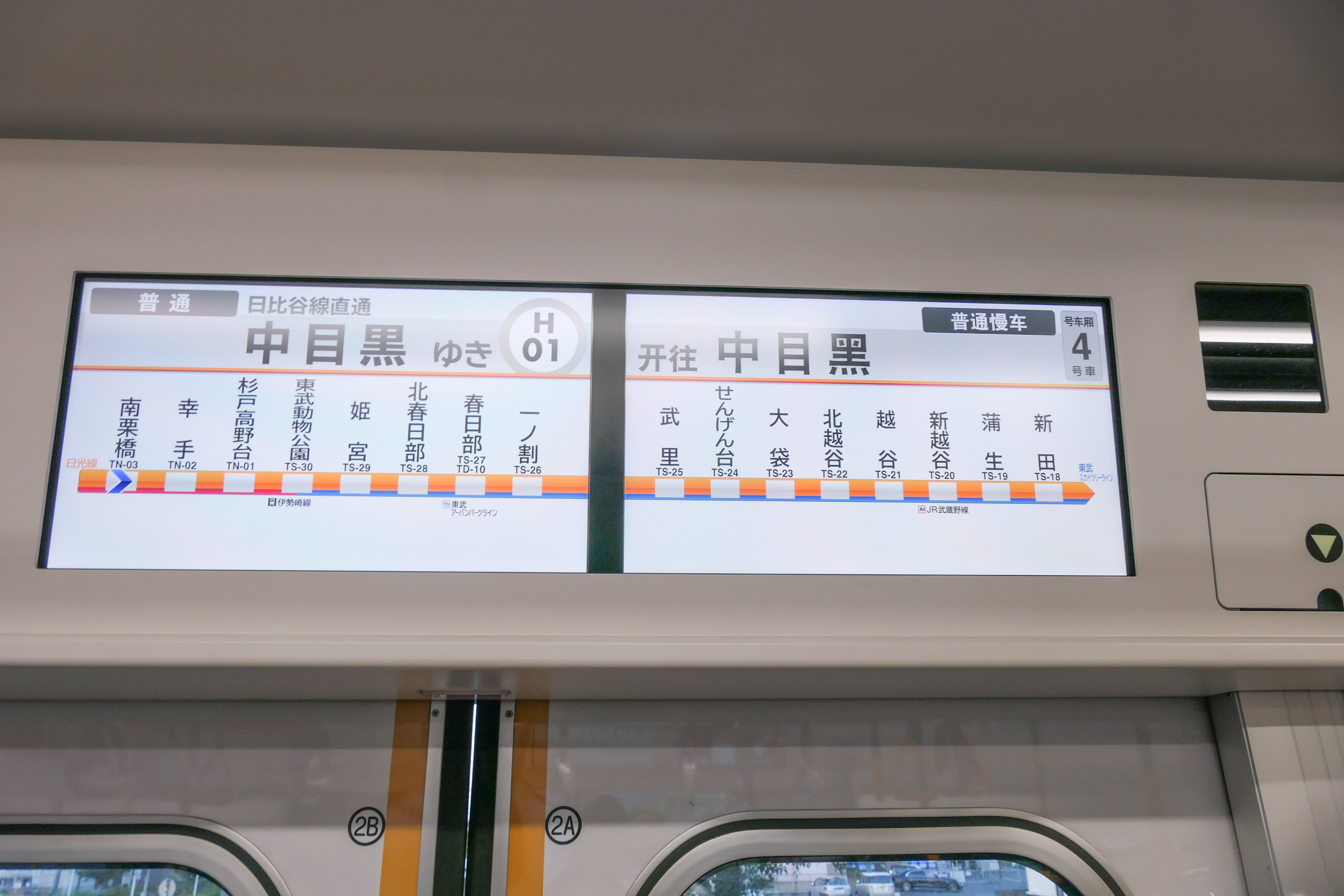
Passenger information displays

=== History ===
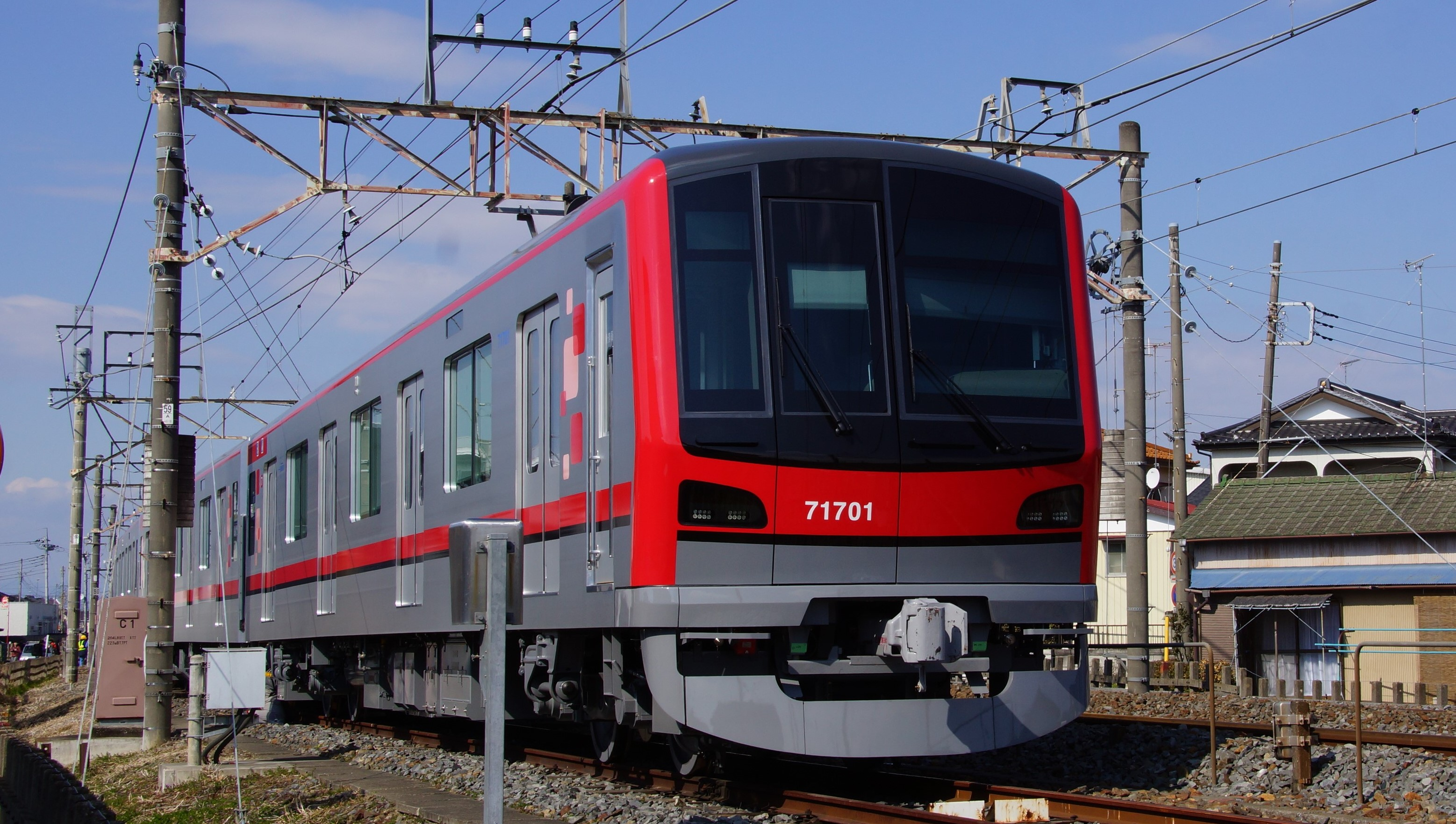
The first set, 71701, on delivery in February 2017

Tobu Railway announced its plans to introduce a new fleet of trains with 20 m (65 ft 7 in) long cars and four sets of doors per side on each car in April 2014, jointly with Tokyo Metro. Details of the new 70000 series trains on order were officially announced on 17 June 2015, together with details of the Tokyo Metro 13000 series to be introduced around the same time. The entire fleet of new trains is scheduled to be delivered between fiscal 2016 and fiscal 2019, with the first set delivered from Kinki Sharyo in February 2017.

The first trains entered revenue service on 7 July 2017.

=== Build histories ===
The delivery dates for the fleet are as shown below.

Set No.	Date delivered
71701	February 2017
71702	March 2017
71703	March 2017
71704	November 2017
71705	December 2017
71706	January 2018
71707	January 2018
71708	February 2018
71709	February 2018
71710	March 2018
71711	January 2019
71712	January 2019
71713	February 2019
71714	February 2019
71715	March 2019
71716	March 2019
71717	January 2020
71718	January 2020

== 70090 series ==
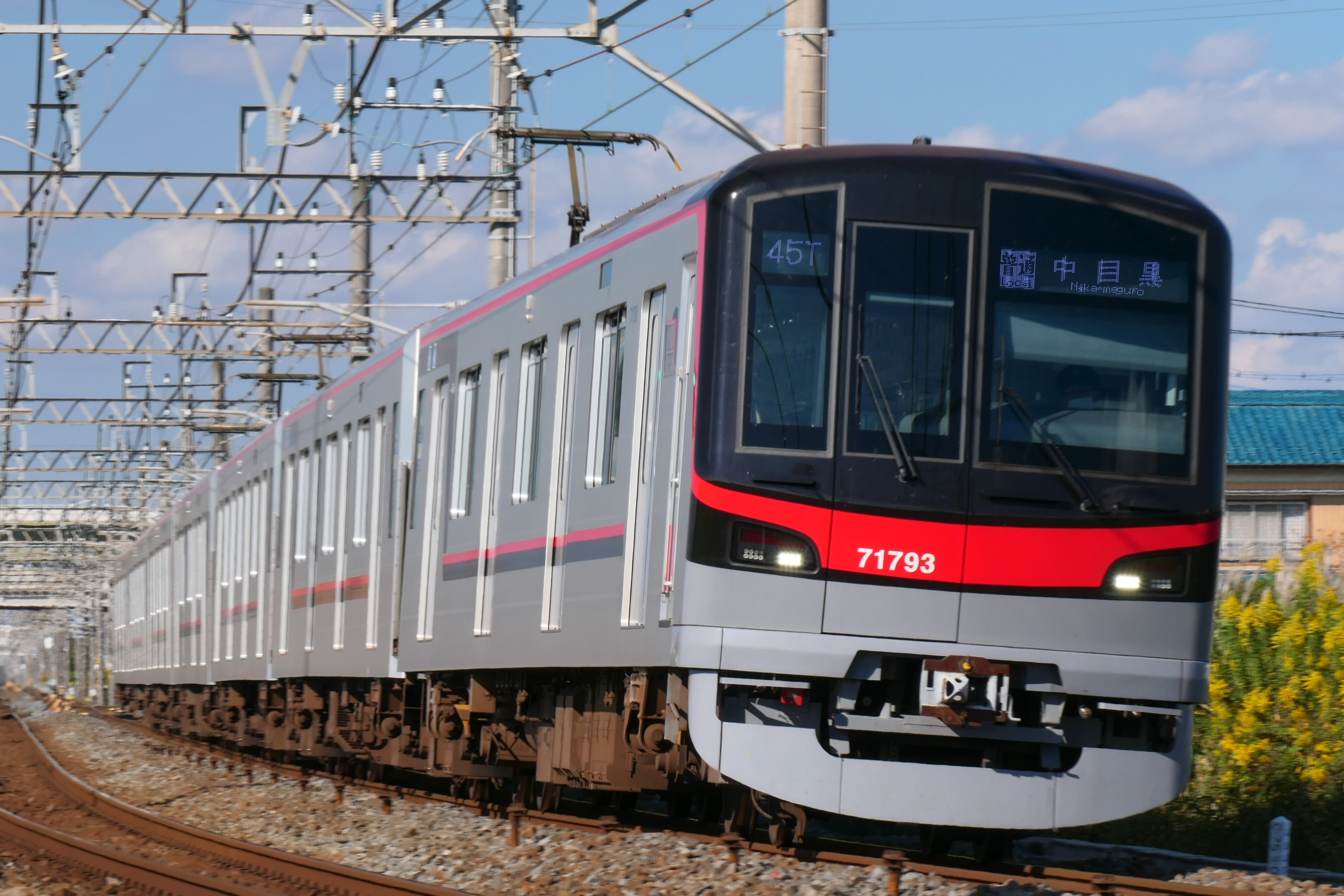
70090 series set 71793 in October 2021

The 70090 series trains are used on Tobu and Tokyo Metro Hibiya Line interrunning services, and were introduced into service on 20 March 2020. They feature a different exterior color scheme than the 70000 series. The service on which these trains operate, branded TH Liner (THライナー), offers reserved seating.

=== Interior ===
The sets have seats that can be arranged longitudinally or transversely.

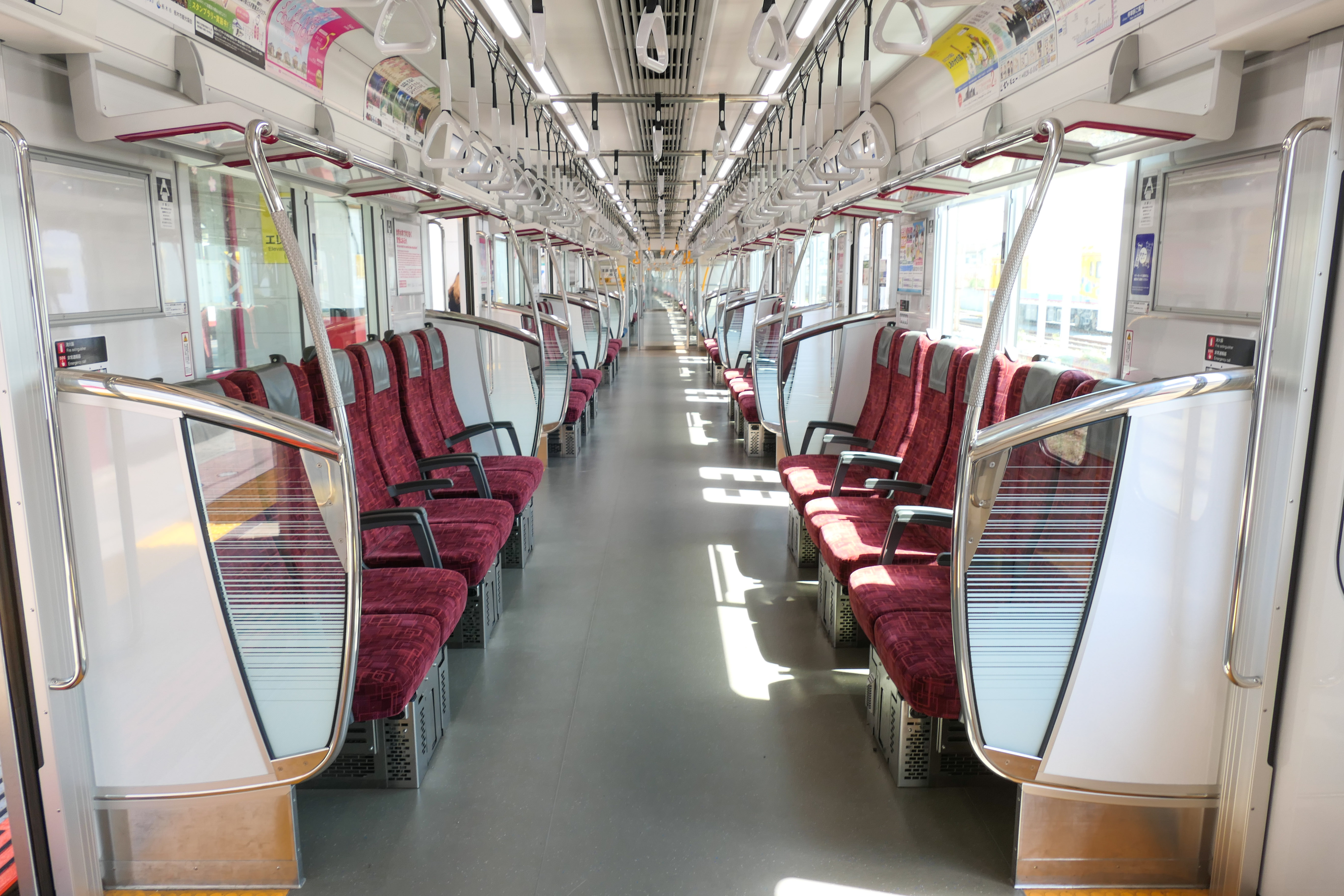
Interior (longitudinal arrangement)

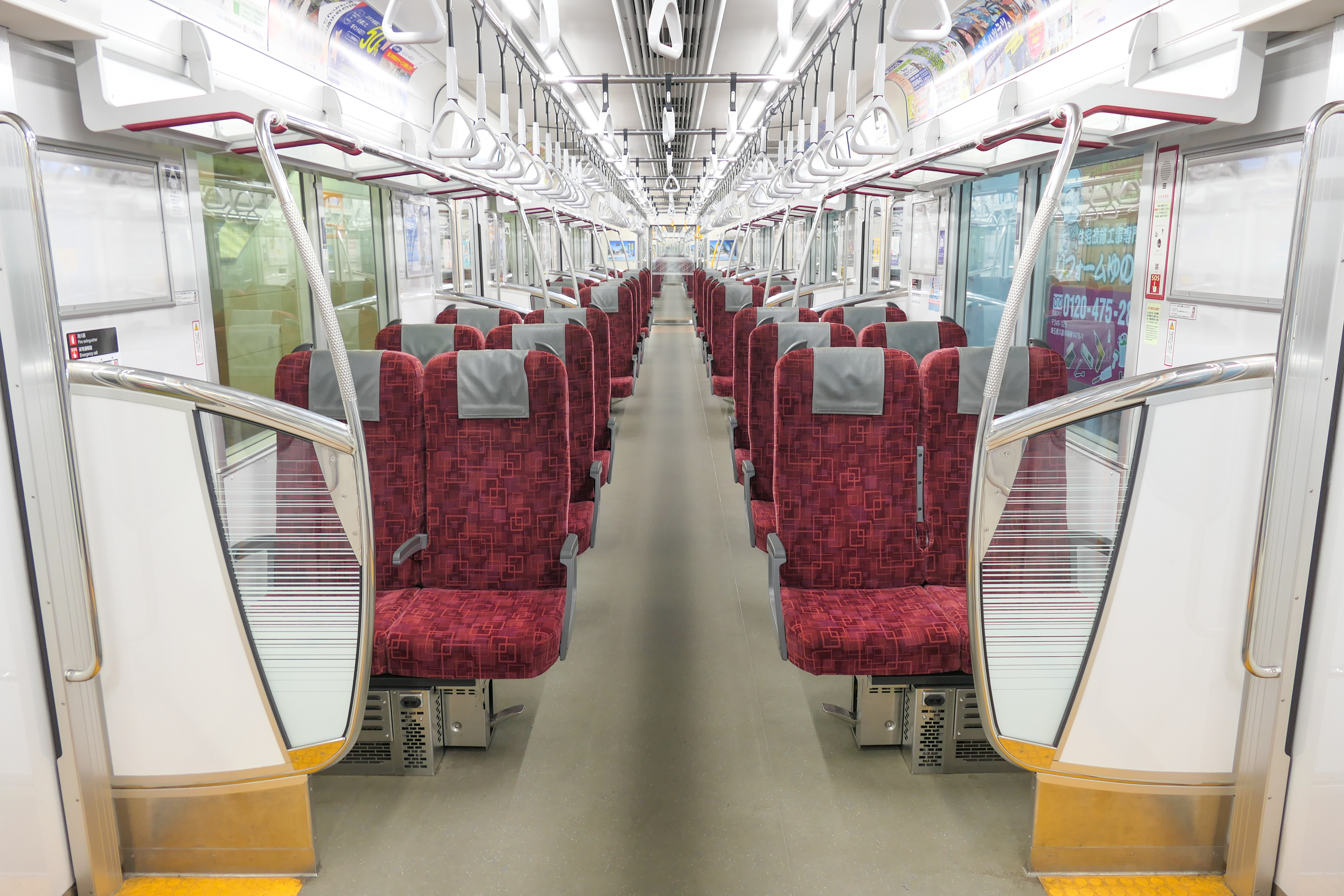
Interior (transverse arrangement)

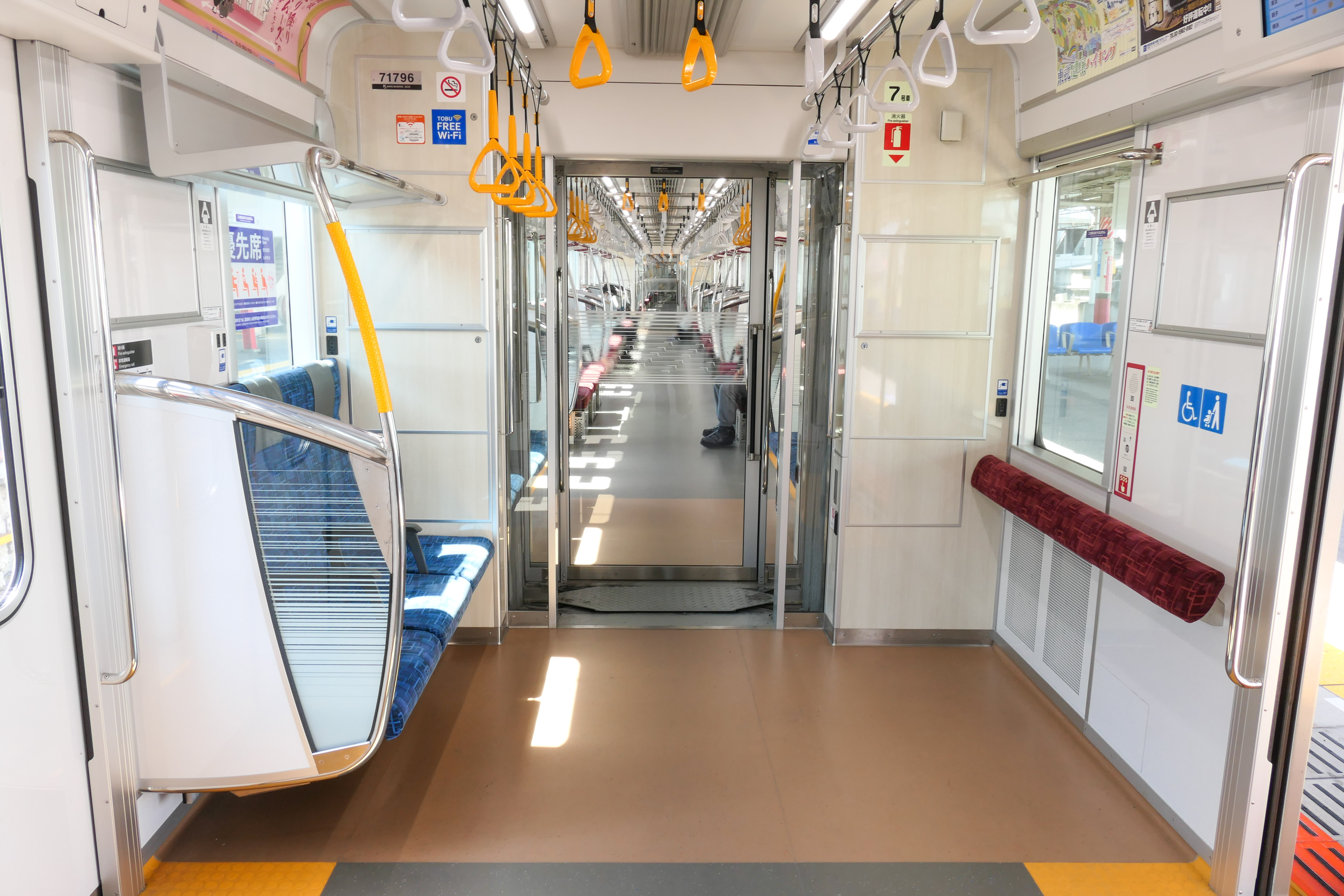
Priority seating

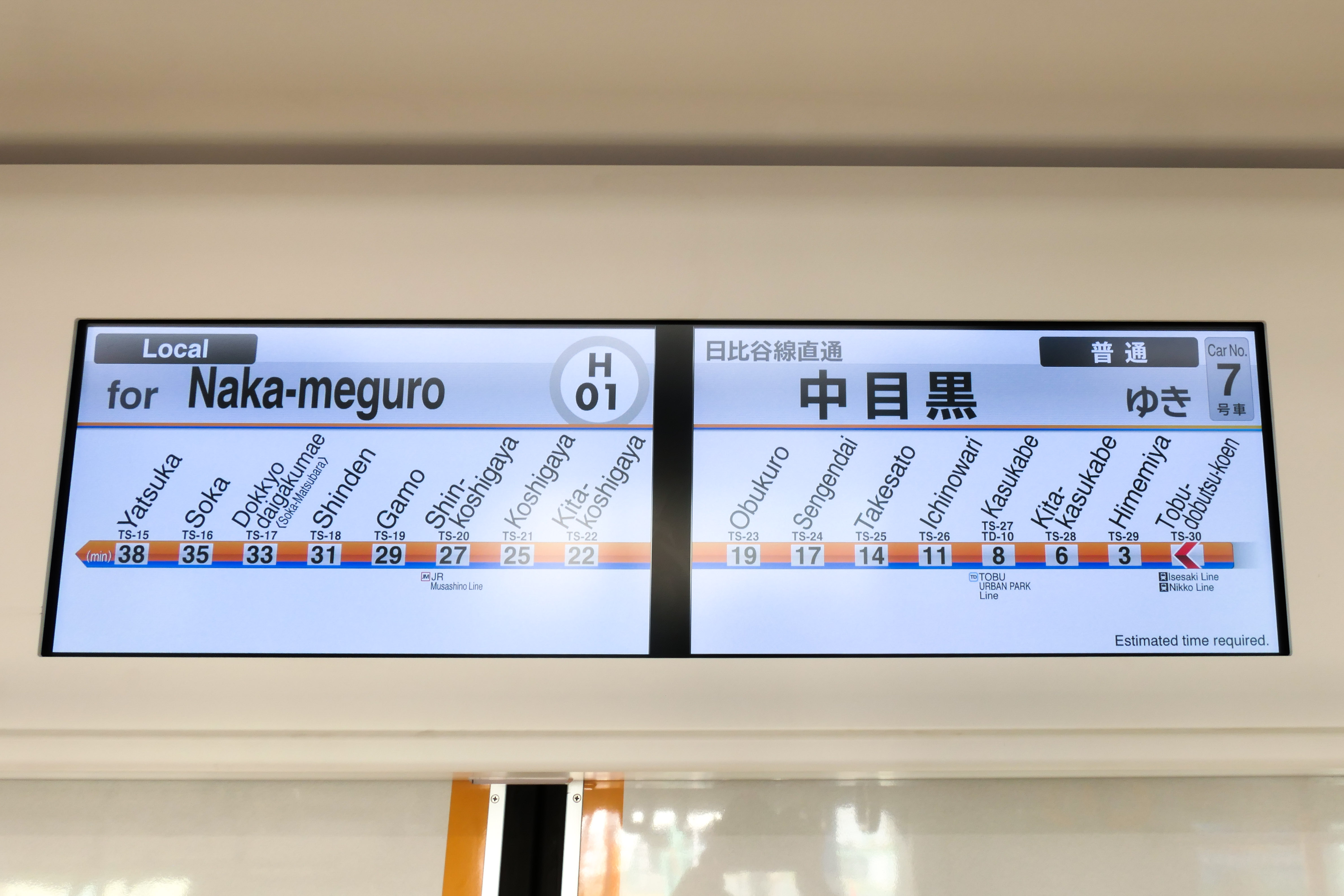
Passenger information displays

=== Build histories ===
The delivery dates for the fleet are as shown below.

Set No.	Date delivered
71791	December 2019
71792	February 2020
71793	March 2020
71794	March 2020
