= Asakusa Station (disambiguation) =

Asakusa Station (浅草駅) is a railway station in the Asakusa district of Taitō, Tokyo, Japan, operated by Tobu Railway, Tokyo Metro, and Toei Subway.

Asakusa Station may also refer to:

- Asakusa Station (Tsukuba Express), operated by Tsukuba Express
- Tokyo Skytree Station, formerly known as Asakusa Station

== See also ==
- Asakusabashi Station, on the Toei Asakusa Line
