= Shin-okachimachi Station =

Metro station in Tokyo, Japan

Coordinates: 35.7072°N 139.7818°E

Shin-okachimachi Station 新御徒町駅

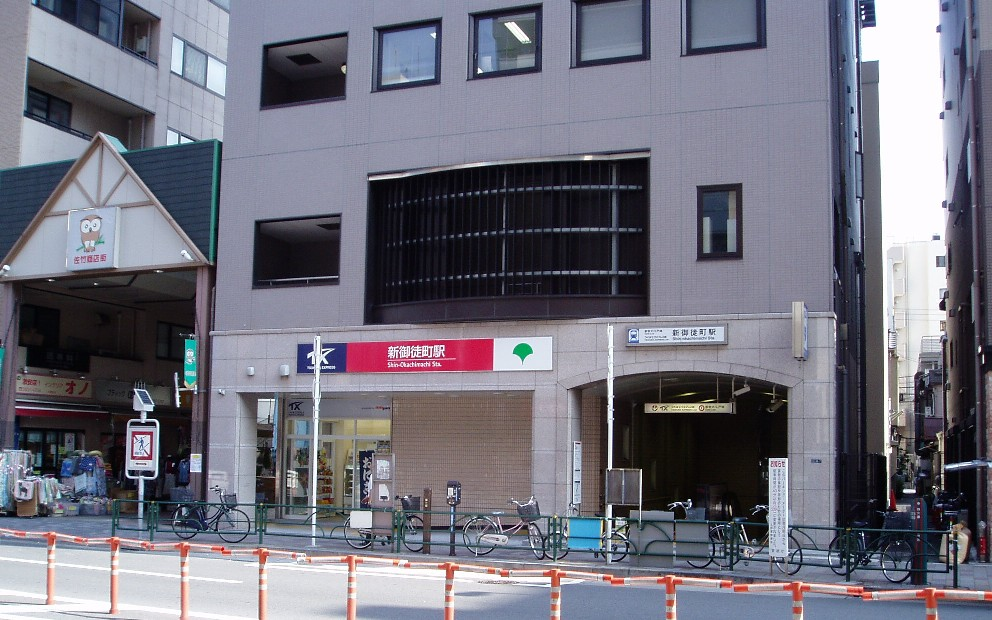
- Exit A2, 2007

General information
- Location: 1 Moto-asakusa, Taitō City, Tokyo （台東区元浅草一丁目） Japan
- Operator: Metropolitan Intercity Railway Company; Toei Subway
- Lines: Tsukuba Express; Ōedo Line
- Platforms: 2 island platform (1 for each line)
- Tracks: 4 (2 for each line)

Construction
- Structure type: Underground

Other information
- Station code: 02 (TX); E-10 (Ōedo Line)

History
- Opened: 12 December 2000; 25 years ago

Services
Preceding station	Tsukuba Express	Following station
Akihabara (TX01) Terminus	Tsukuba Express Rapid Commuter-Rapid Semi-Rapid Local	Asakusa (TX03) towards Tsukuba
Preceding station	Toei Subway	Following station
Ueno-okachimachi towards Tochōmae	Ōedo Line	Kuramae towards Hikarigaoka
Location
- Location within Tokyo Yamanote Loop Location within Tokyo wards area Location within Japan

Shin-okachimachi Station (新御徒町駅, Shin-okachimachi-eki) is a subway station in Taitō, Tokyo, Japan, jointly operated by Toei Subway and Metropolitan Intercity Railway Company.

== Lines ==
Shin-okachimachi Station is served by the following two lines.

- Toei Ōedo Line (E-10)
- Tsukuba Express (02)

== Platforms ==
=== Toei ===
The station consists of an island platform serving two tracks. There are also two siding tracks between this station and Kuramae for trains starting and terminating at this station.

1	Ōedo Line	for Iidabashi and Tochōmae (Transfer at Tochōmae for Nerima, Hikarigaoka, and Roppongi)
2	Ōedo Line	for Ryōgoku, Daimon, Shinjuku, and Hikarigaoka

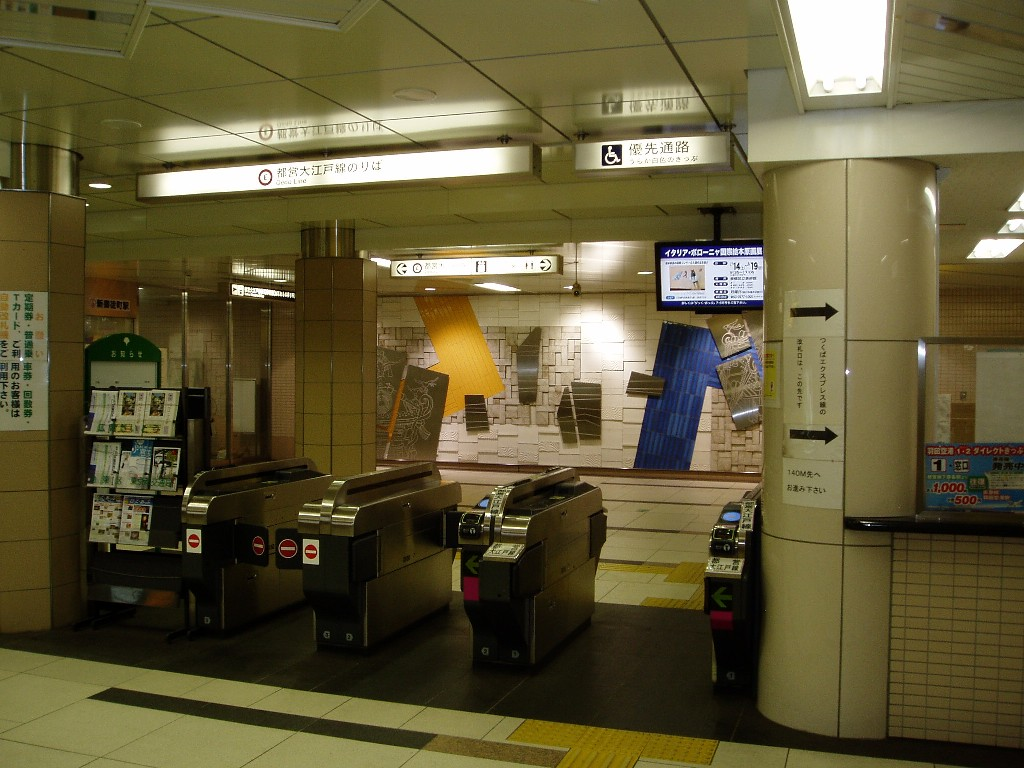
Oedo Line ticket gates, 2007

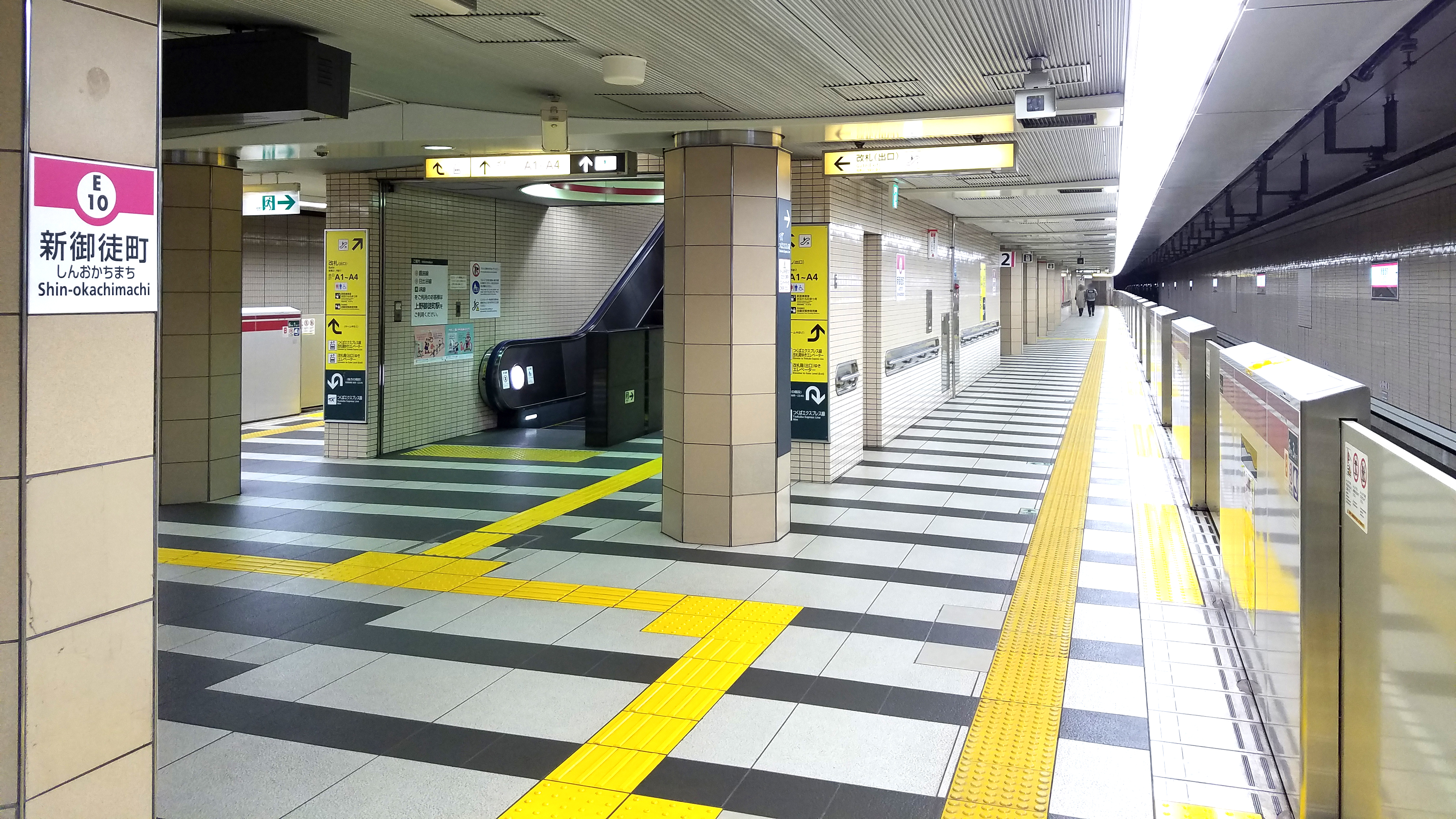
Oedo Line platforms, 2019

=== Tsukuba Express ===
In 2019, platform expansion work commenced to accommodate 8-car trains in the future.

1	Tsukuba Express	for Kita-Senju, Minami-Nagareyama, Moriya and Tsukuba
2	Tsukuba Express	for Akihabara

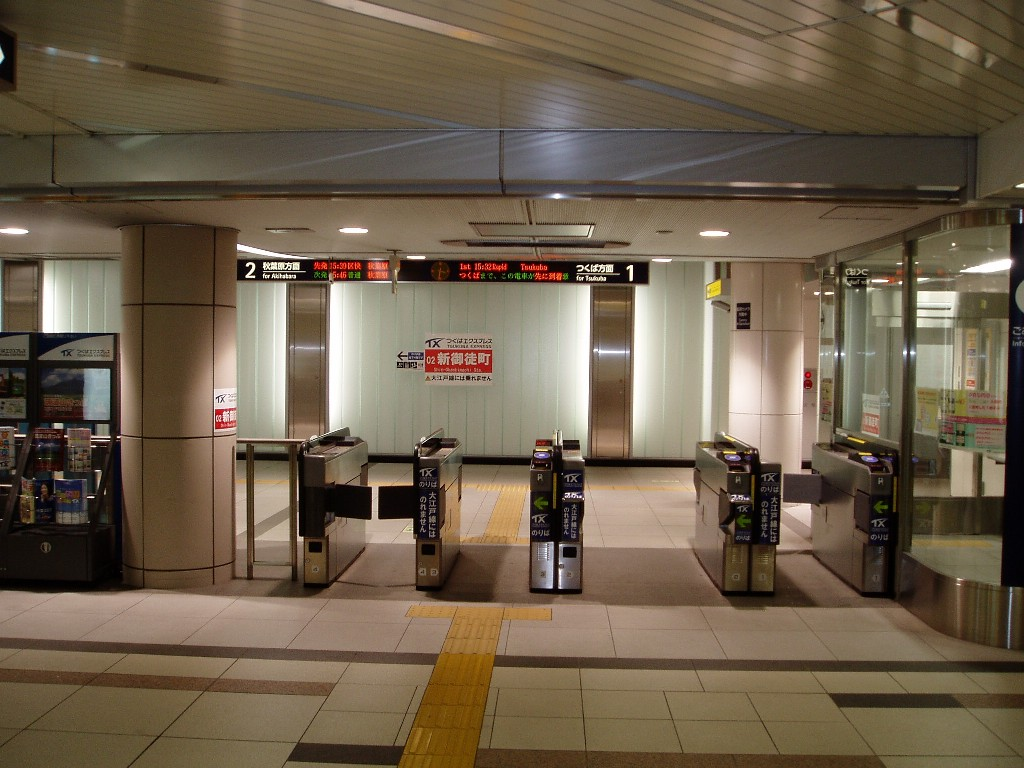
Tsukuba Express ticket gates, 2007

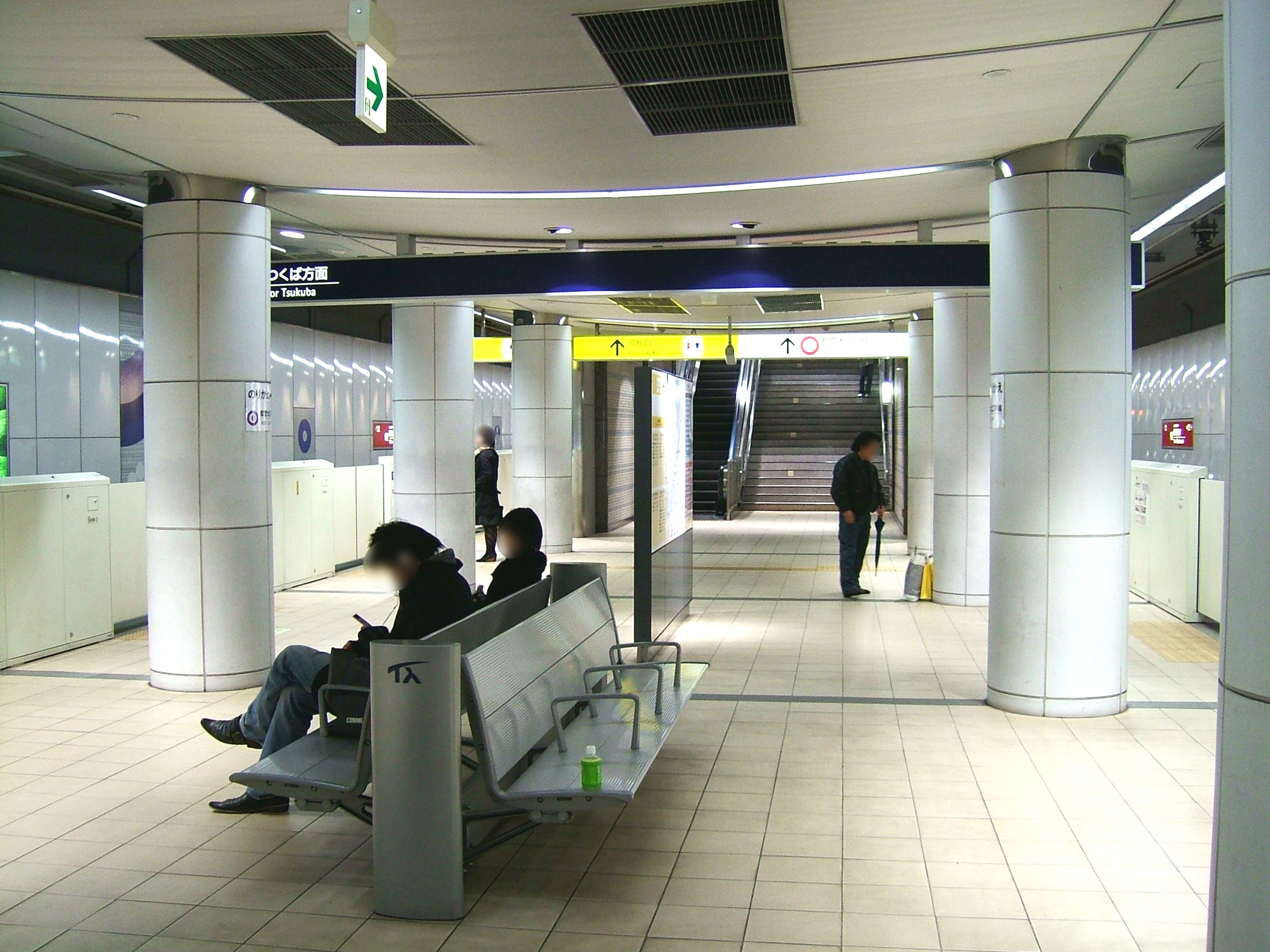
Tsukuba Express platform, 2007

== History ==
The station opened on 12 December 2000, when the Ōedo Line began operation. Service on the Tsukuba Express Line started on August 24 August 2005.
