= Iwamotocho Station =

Metro station in Chiyoda, Tokyo, Japan

Iwamotocho Station 岩本町駅

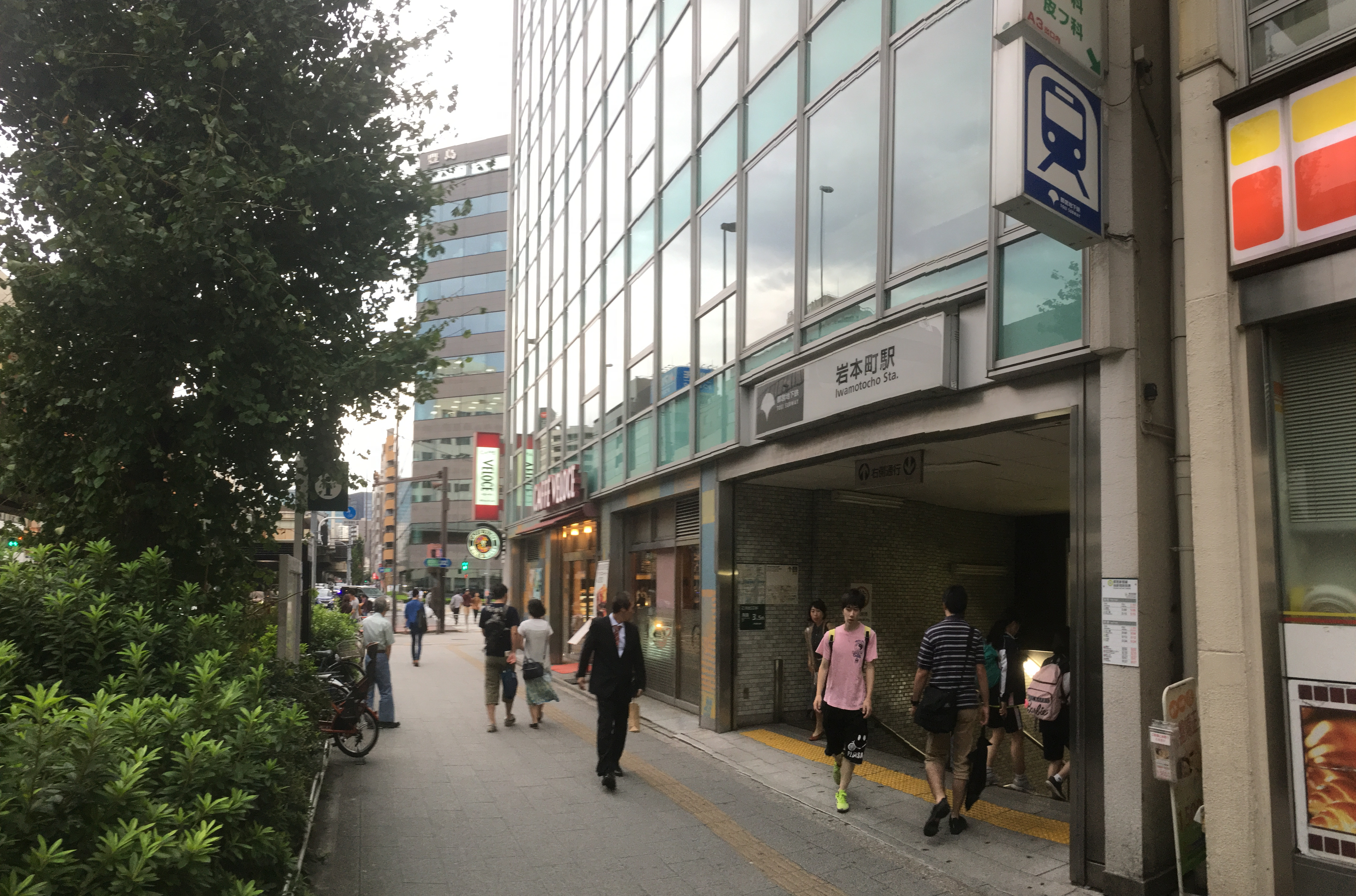
- Entrance A3 in September 2019

General information
- Location: 1 Kanda-Iwamoto-chō, Chiyoda City, Tokyo 〒101-0033; Japan
- Coordinates: 35.695545°N 139.775855°E
- Operator: Toei Subway
- Line: Shinjuku Line
- Distance: 7.3 km (4.5 mi) from Shinjuku
- Platforms: 2 island platforms
- Tracks: 3
- Connections: Akihabara Station; Bus stop

Construction
- Structure type: Underground

Other information
- Station code: S-08
- Website: Official website

History
- Opened: 21 December 1978; 47 years ago

Passengers
- FY2011: 40,324 daily

Services
| Preceding station | Toei Subway | Following station |
|---|---|---|
| Ogawamachi towards Shinjuku | Shinjuku Line Local | Bakuro-yokoyama towards Motoyawata |
Location
- Location within Tokyo Yamanote Loop Location within Tokyo wards area Location within Japan

Iwamotocho Station (岩本町駅, Iwamotochō-eki) is a subway station on the Toei Shinjuku Line in Chiyoda, Tokyo, Japan, operated by Tokyo Metropolitan Bureau of Transportation (Toei). Its station number is S-08. The station opened on December 21, 1978.

== Lines ==
Iwamotocho Station is served by the Toei Shinjuku Line, and lies 7.3 km from the starting point of the line at Shinjuku. Express Trains skip this station, which affects commuters going to Akihabara Station.

== Platforms ==
Iwamotocho Station consists of two island platforms serving three tracks.

| 1 | Shinjuku Line | for Shinjuku; Keio Line for Sasazuka and Hashimoto |
| 2 | Shinjuku Line | for Shinjuku; Keio Line for Sasazuka, and Hashimoto (used for waiting for passing expresses or terminating trains) |
| 3 | Shinjuku Line | for Bakuro-yokoyama and Motoyawata (used for waiting for passing expresses or terminating trains) |
| 4 | Shinjuku Line | for Bakuro-yokoyama and Motoyawata |

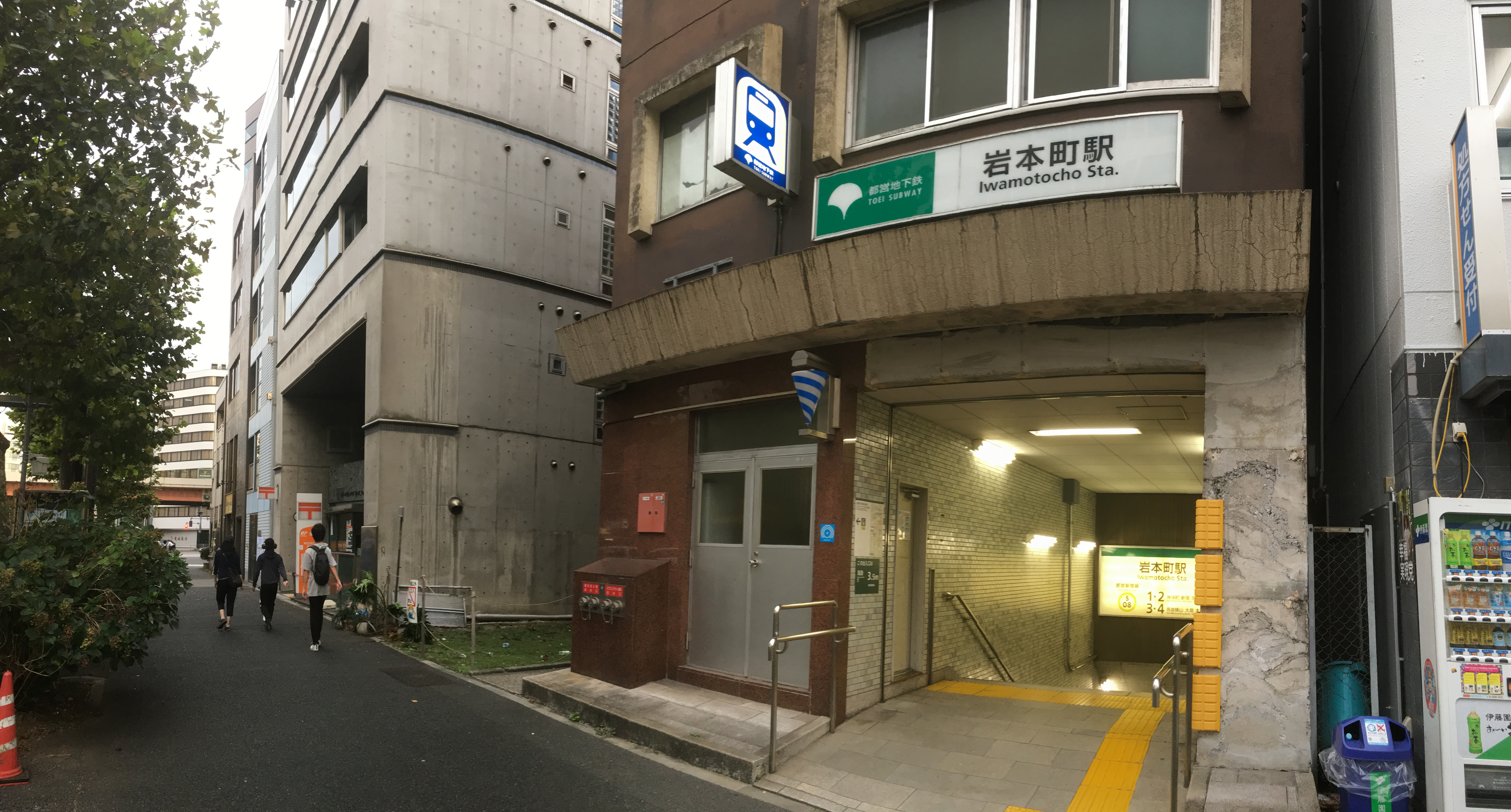
Entrance A1 in September 2019

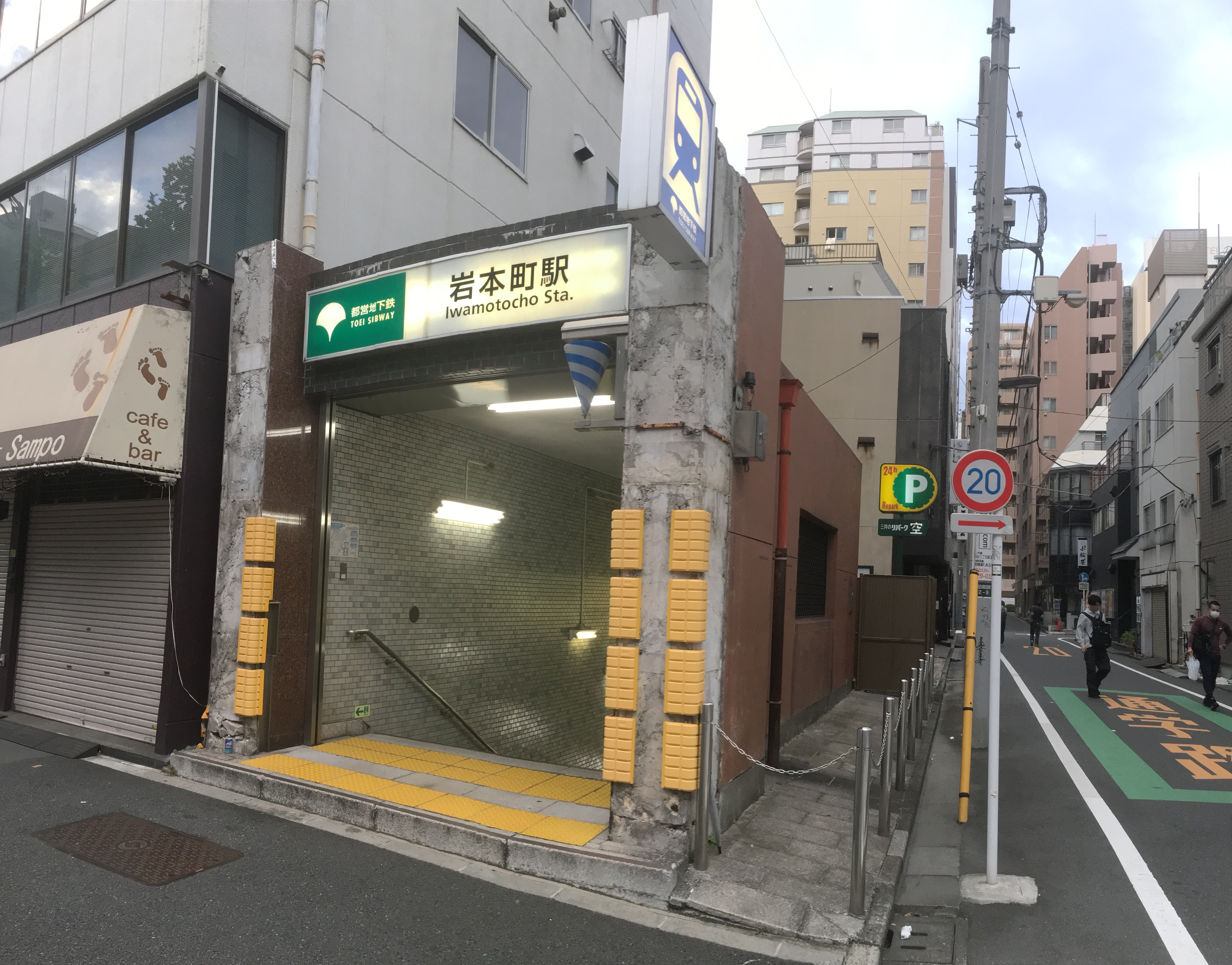
Entrance A2 in September 2019

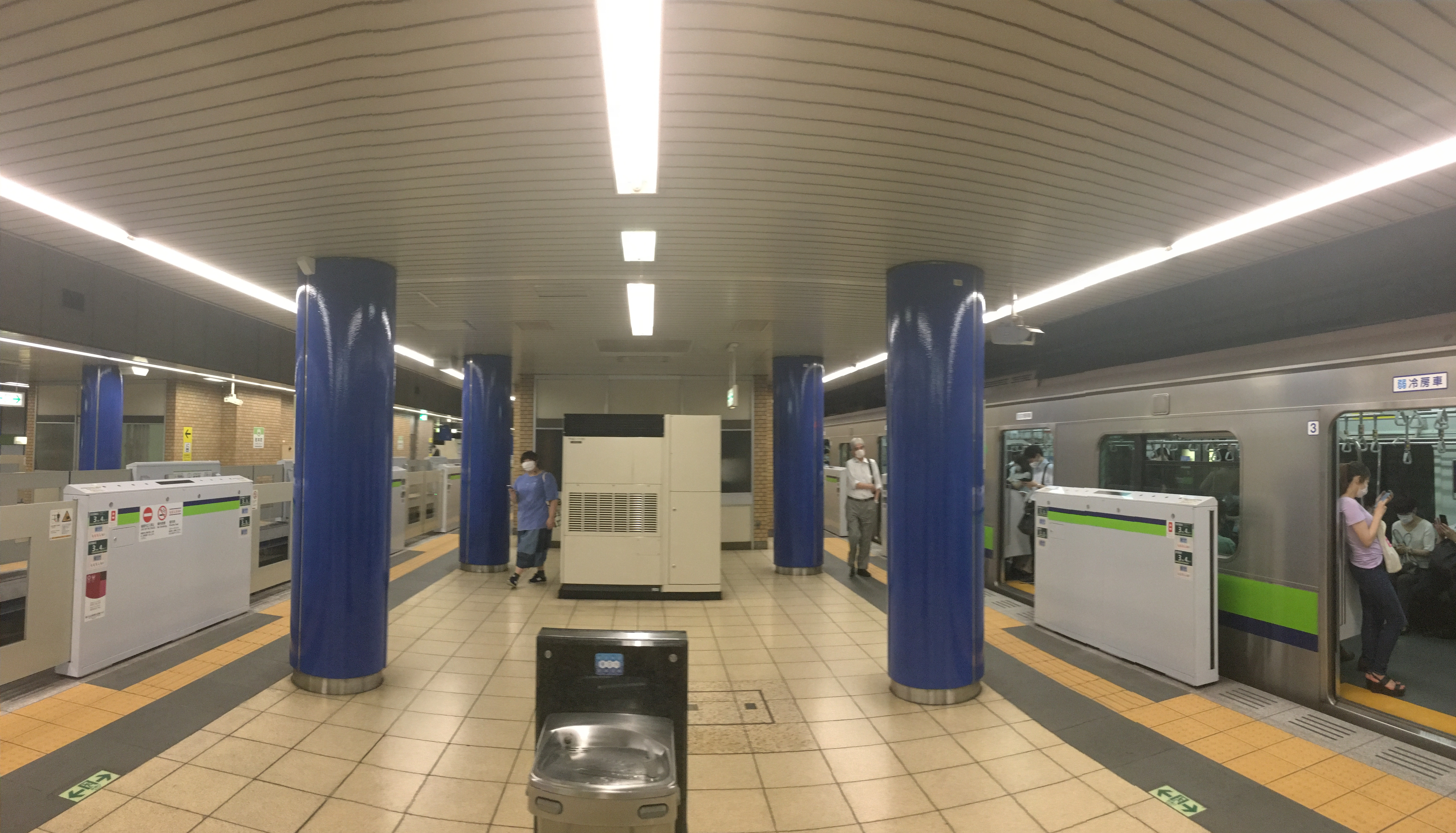
Platforms 1 and 2 in May 2020

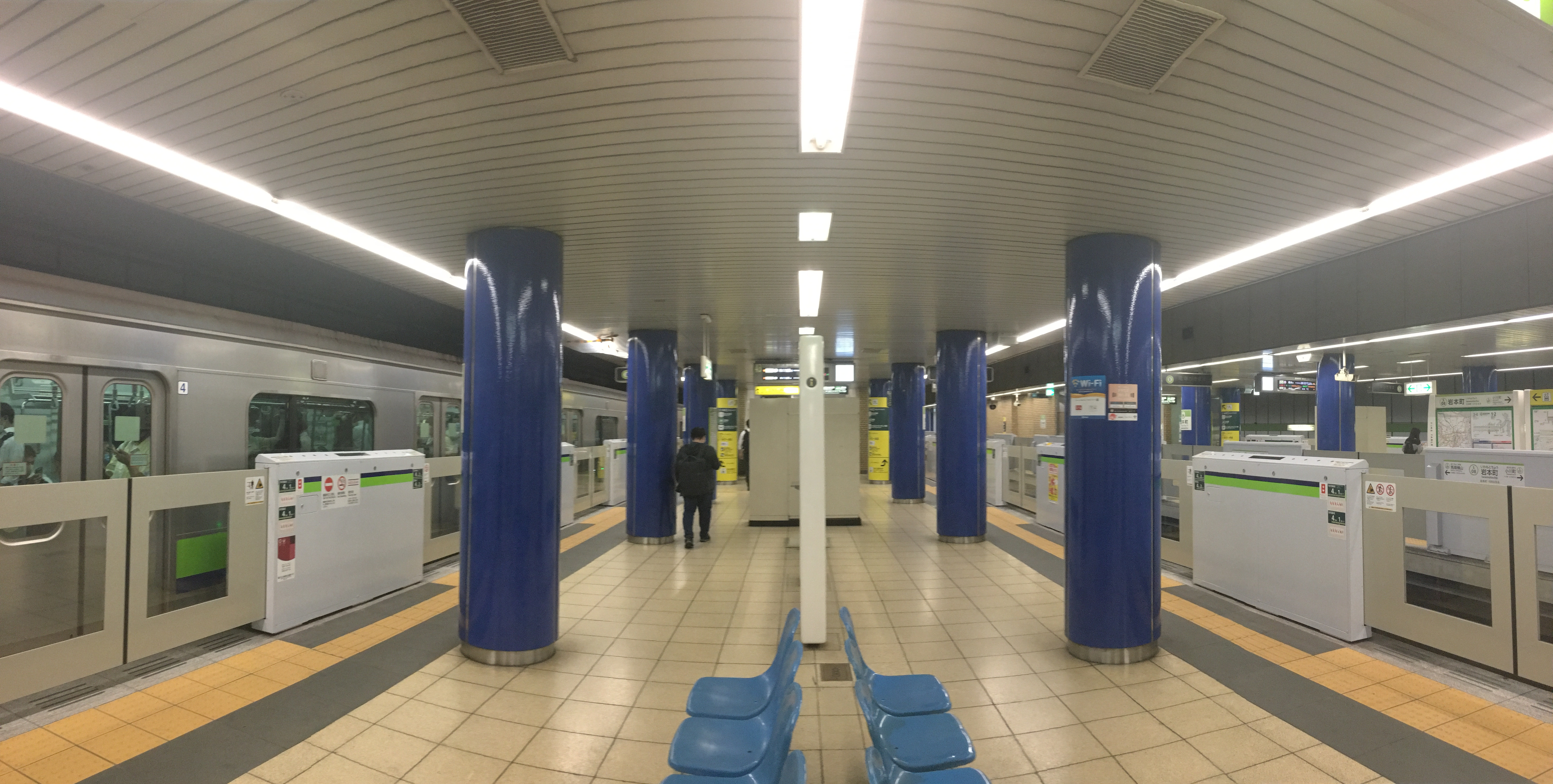
Platforms 3 and 4 in May 2020

== History ==
Iwamotocho Station opened on 21 December 1978.

== Passenger statistics ==
In fiscal 2011, the station was used by an average of 40,324 passengers daily.

== Surrounding area ==
The station is located 200 meters southeast of Akihabara near the Kanda River, underneath the intersection of National Route 4 (Shōwa-dōri) and Tokyo Metropolitan Route 302 (Yasukuni-dōri). The Shuto Expressway's No. 1 Ueno Line runs overhead. The area is mostly commercial, with some apartment buildings scattered throughout. Other points of interest include:

- Yamazaki Baking head office
- Higashi-Kanda textile wholesale district

== Bus services ==
Stop: Iwamotochō-Ekimae

- Aki 26 for Kasai Station

== See also ==
- List of railway stations in Japan
