= Asakusa Station (Tsukuba Express) =

Railway station in Tokyo, Japan

Coordinates: 35.7132509°N 139.7923082°E

Asakusa Station 浅草駅
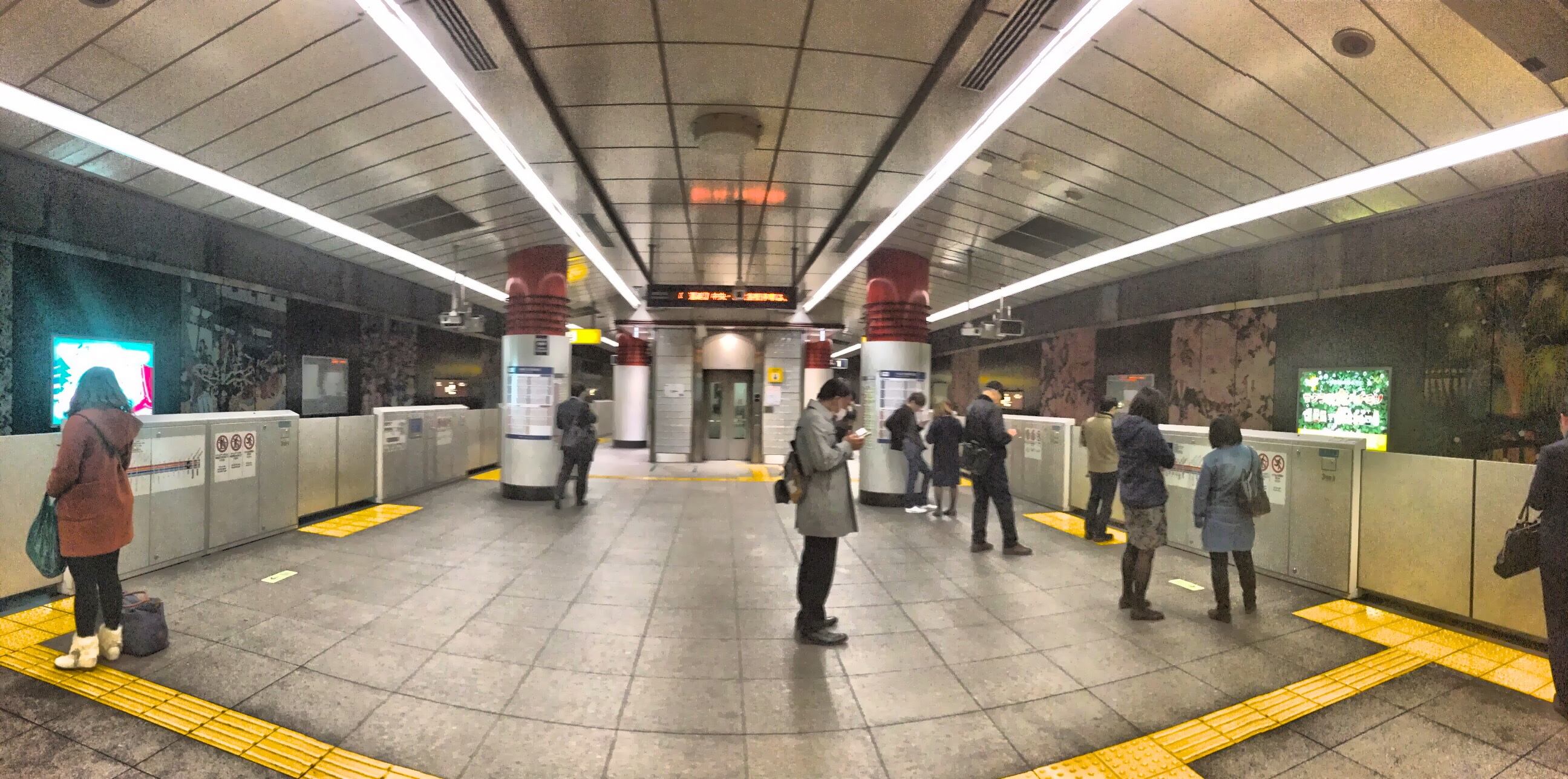
- Platform level of Asakusa Station, 2018

General information
- Location: 3-1-11 Nishi-Asakusa, Taito, Tokyo （東京都台東区西浅草3-1-11） Japan
- Operator: Metropolitan Intercity Railway Company
- Line: Tsukuba Express
- Platforms: 2 (1 island platform)

Construction
- Structure type: Underground

Other information
- Station code: TX03

History
- Opened: 2005

Services
| Preceding station | Tsukuba Express | Following station |
|---|---|---|
| Shin-okachimachi (TX02) towards Akihabara | Tsukuba Express Rapid Commuter-Rapid Semi-Rapid Local | Minami-Senju (TX04) towards Tsukuba |
Location

Asakusa Station (浅草駅, Asakusa-eki) is an underground railway station on the Tsukuba Express line in the Asakusa district of Taitō, Tokyo, Japan, operated by the private railway operator Metropolitan Intercity Railway Company. It is numbered "TX03".

This station is 600 meters (2,000 ft) to the west of the station complex of the same name serving the Tobu Skytree Line of the Tobu Railway, the Ginza Line of the Tokyo Metro, and the Asakusa Line of the Toei Subway. There are no transfer passageways between these two stations; passengers must transfer by walking at street level.

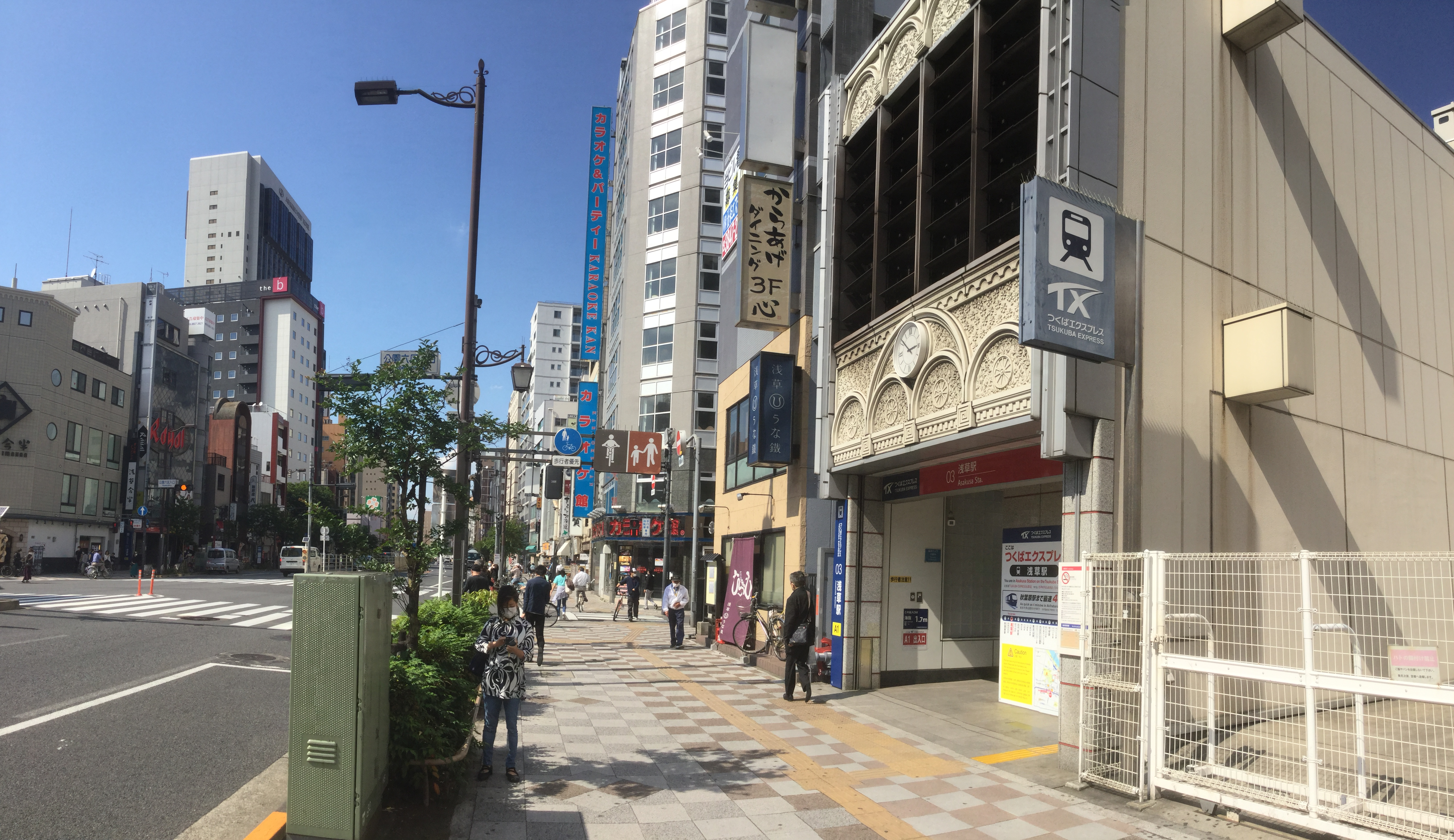
Exit A1, 2020

While the station is located only 300 meters from the Tawaramachi station on the Ginza Line, there is no transfer corridor between the two.

== Lines ==
- Tsukuba Express:
  - Tsukuba Express

== Station layout ==
The station has a single underground island platform located on the fourth basement ("B4F") level.

=== Platforms ===
| 1 | Tsukuba Express | for Kita-Senju, Minami-Nagareyama, Moriya and Tsukuba |
| 2 | Tsukuba Express | for Akihabara |

== History ==
The station opened on August 24, 2005.

== Surrounding area ==
The station is about 300 meters (980 ft) west of Sensō-ji temple.

The Rox department store can be reached from the southeast of the station, and the Asakusa View Hotel is located at the northeast corner of the station. The station is also surrounded by a variety of restaurants, theaters, pachinko parlors, and the Hanayashiki amusement park.
