= Kuramae Station =

Metro station in Tokyo, Japan

Coordinates: 35.7030°N 139.7911°E

Kuramae Station 蔵前駅

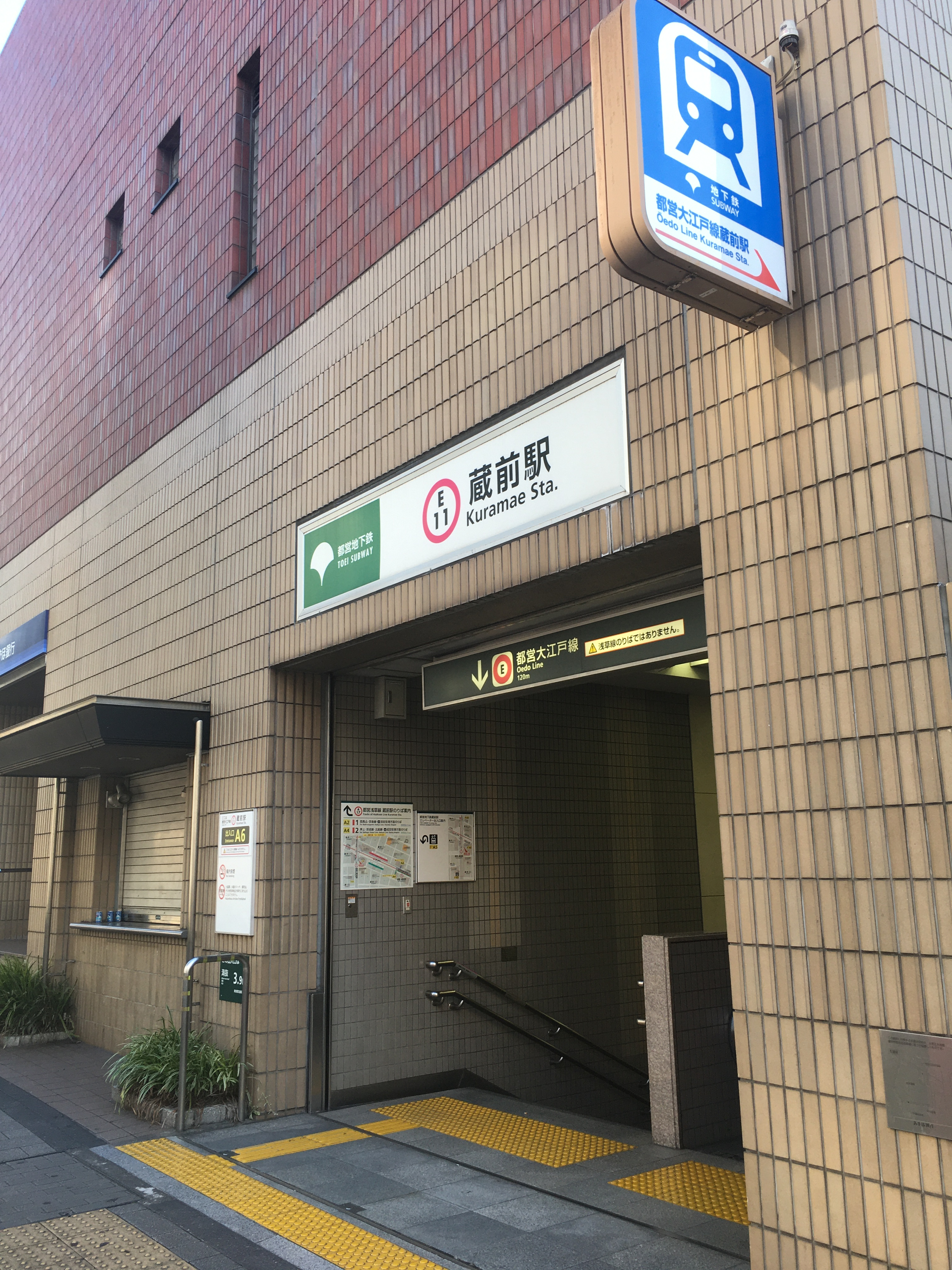
- Kuramae Station entrance

Japanese name
- Shinjitai: 蔵前駅
- Kyūjitai: 藏前驛
- Hiragana: くらまええき

General information
- Location: 2-3-1 Kuramae (Asakusa Line); 3-3-1 Kotobuki (Ōedo Line); Taitō City, Tokyo; Japan
- Operator: Toei Subway
- Lines: Ōedo Line; Asakusa Line
- Platforms: 2 side platforms (Asakusa Line), 2 side platforms (Ōedo Line)
- Tracks: 4 (2 for each line)

Construction
- Structure type: Underground

Other information
- Station code: E-11 (Oedo Line); A-17 (Asakusa Line)

History
- Opened: 4 December 1960; 65 years ago

Services
Preceding station	Toei Subway	Following station
Asakusabashi towards Nishi-magome	Asakusa Line	Asakusa towards Oshiage
Shin-okachimachi towards Tochōmae	Ōedo Line	Ryogoku towards Hikarigaoka
Location
- Location within Special wards of Tokyo Location within Tokyo Bay and Bōsō Peninsula Location within Tokyo Location within Japan

Kuramae Station (蔵前駅, Kuramae-eki) is a subway station located in the Kuramae and Kotobuki neighborhoods of Taitō, Tokyo, Japan. It serves the Toei Asakusa Line and Toei Oedo Line, both of which are operated by the Tokyo Metropolitan Bureau of Transportation (Toei). The station is identified as A-17 on the Asakusa Line and E-11 on the Ōedo Line. While there is no underground connection between the two lines, passengers can transfer between them at ground level.

== Station layout ==
On the Asakusa Line, Kuramae has two platforms with the two tracks between them. Track 1 is for passengers bound for Nihombashi and Nishi-magome Stations. Track 2 is for those traveling in the opposite direction toward the terminal of the Asakusa subway line at Oshiage Station.

1	Asakusa Line	for Nihombashi, Shimbashi, and Nishi-magome; Keikyū Main Line for Shinagawa and Haneda Airport (International Terminal and Domestic Terminal)
2	Asakusa Line	for Asakusa, and Oshiage; Keisei Main Line for Narita Airport (Terminal 2·3 and Terminal 1); Narita Sky Access Line for Narita Airport; Hokusō Line for Imba Nihon-idai; Shibayama Railway Line for Shibayama-Chiyoda

On the Oedo Line, an island platform stands between the two tracks. Track 1 serves passengers bound for Iidabashi and Tochōmae Stations, while Track 2 carries trains toward Ryōgoku and Daimon Stations.

1	Ōedo Line	for Iidabashi and Tochomae
2	Ōedo Line	for Ryogoku and Daimon

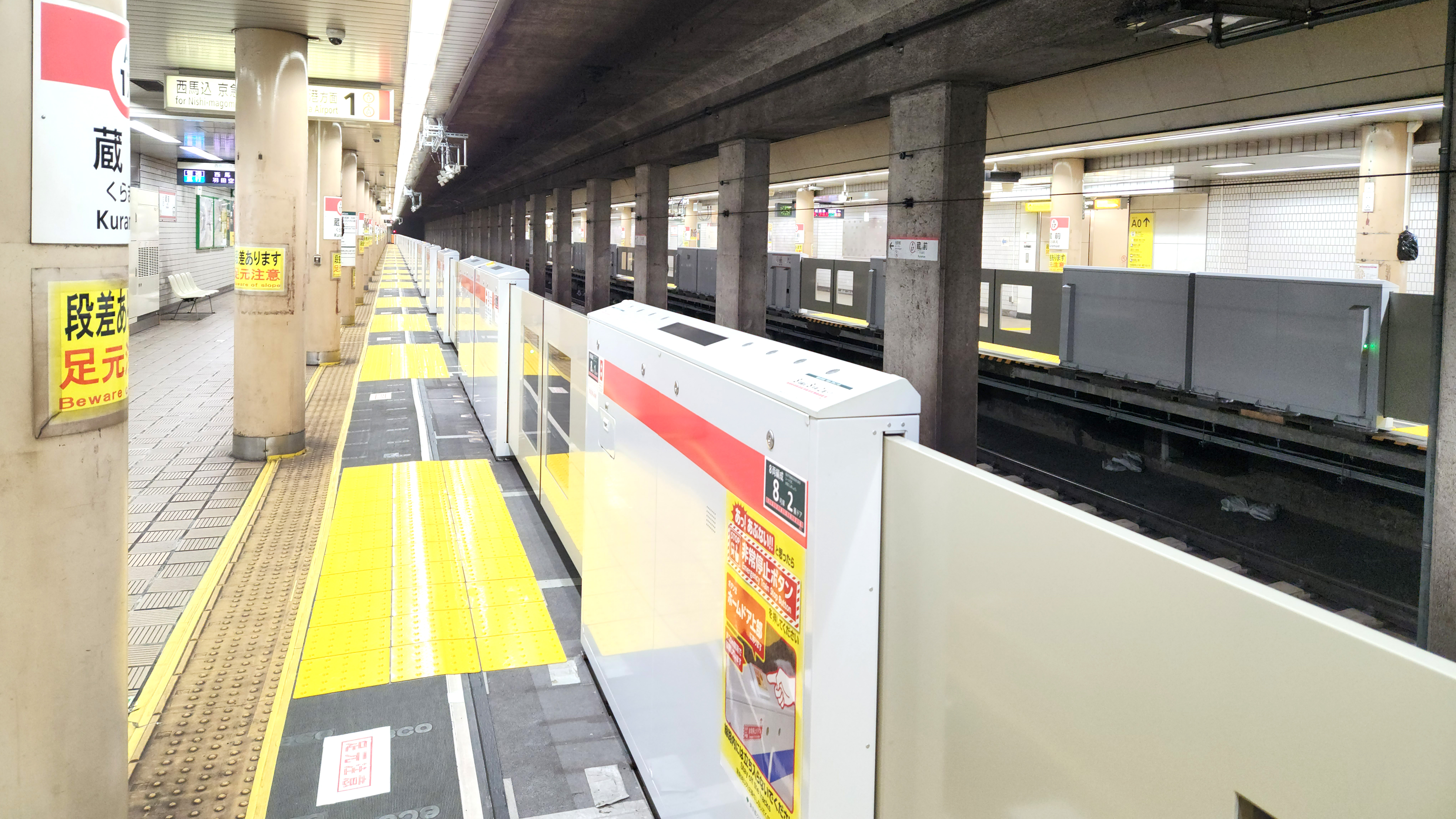
Asakusa Line platforms, May 2023

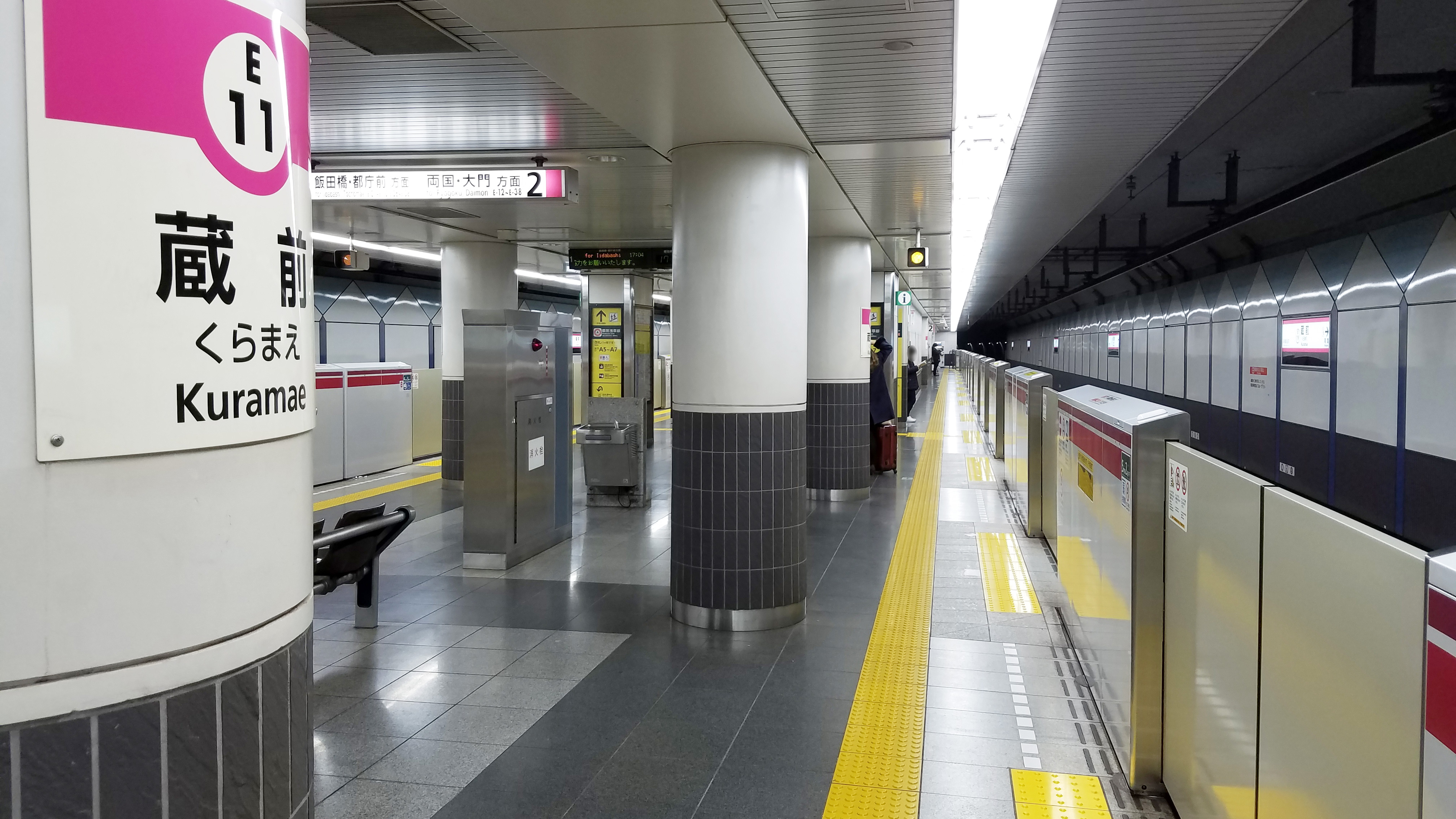
Oedo Line platforms, December 2017

== History ==
Kuramae Station opened on December 4, 1960, as a station on Toei Line 1 (the present-day Asakusa Line). The Oedo Line (Line 12) station opened on December 12, 2000.

== Surrounding area ==
The station serves the Kuramae and Kotobuki neighborhoods. Nearby are the Kuramae Water Treatment Center (on the site of the old Kuramae sumo stadium, which the station served until the stadium closed), the Sumida River, National Route 6, offices of the city's Bureau of Waterworks and Bureau of Sewerage, and Torigoe Shrine.

== See also ==
- List of railway stations in Japan
