= Akihabara Station =

Railway and metro station in Tokyo, Japan

Akihabara Station 秋葉原駅
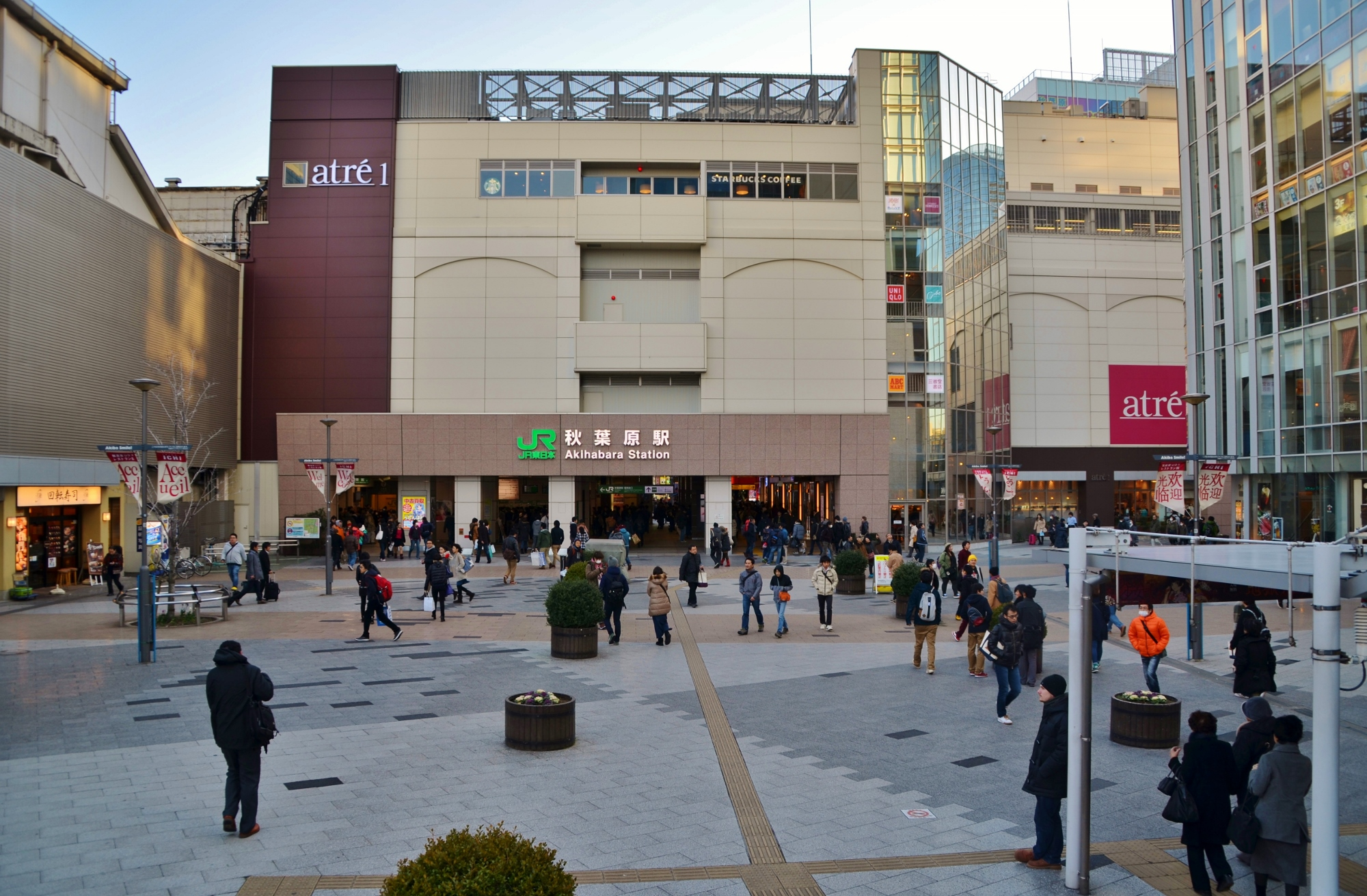
- The Akihabara Electric Town entrance of Akihabara Station in February 2015

General information
- Location: 1 Soto-Kanda (JR Station); Kanda-Sakuma-chō (Tokyo Metro); Kanda-Hanaoka-chō (Tsukuba Express); Chiyoda City, Tokyo; Japan
- Operator: JR East; Tokyo Metro; Metropolitan Intercity Railway Company
- Connections: Iwamotocho Station; Bus Terminal

History
- Opened: 1 November 1890; 136 years ago

Passengers
- FY2024: 442,842 daily; 111,781 daily; 123,783 daily
Location
- Location within Tokyo Yamanote Loop Location within Tokyo wards area Location within Japan

Akihabara Station (秋葉原駅, Akihabara-eki) is an interchange railway station in Chiyoda, Tokyo, Japan. It is at the center of the Akihabara shopping district specializing in electronic goods.

== Lines ==
Akihabara Station is served by the following lines.
JR East:

- Tōhoku Main Line
  - Keihin-Tohoku Line
  - Yamanote Line
- Sōbu Main Line
  - Chūō-Sōbu Line

Tokyo Metro:

- Hibiya Line

Metropolitan Intercity Railway Company:

- Tsukuba Express

The above-ground section of the station is cross-shaped, with the Chūō-Sōbu Line tracks running from east to west, and the Yamanote and Keihin-Tohoku Line (and Tohoku Shinkansen and Ueno–Tokyo Line, which do not stop at Akihabara) from north to south.

== Station layout ==
=== JR East ===
AKBJK28 JY03 JB19 Akihabara Station 秋葉原駅
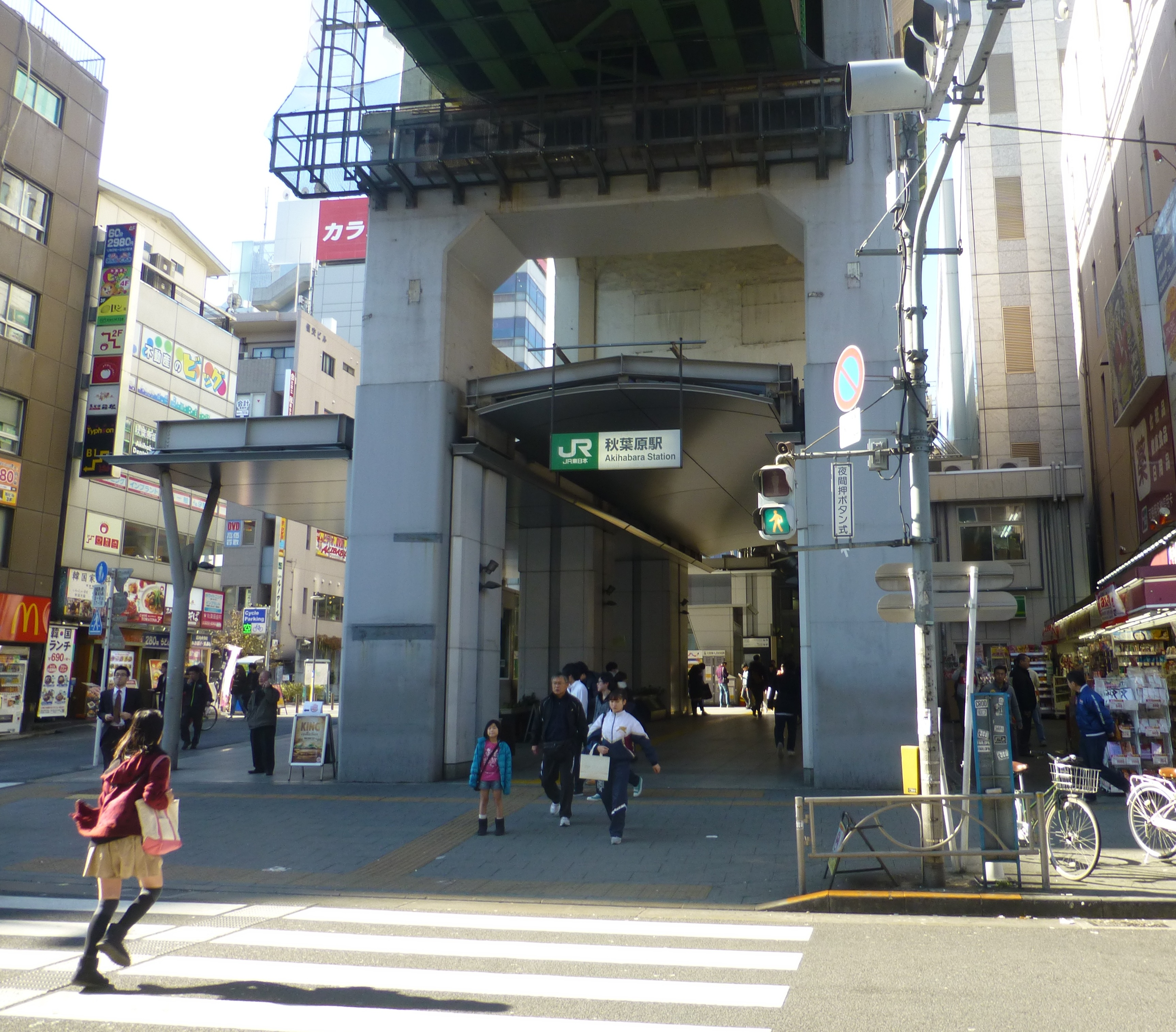
- JR Akihabara Station Showa Dori Entrance in January 2016

General information
- Location: 1 Soto-Kanda, Chiyoda City, Tokyo; Japan
- Coordinates: 35°41′54″N 139°46′23″E
- Operator: JR East
- Lines: Tōhoku Main Line; Sōbu Main Line (Branch); Yamanote Line
- Platforms: 2 island platforms (Keihin-Tōhoku and Yamanote Lines); 2 side platforms (Sōbu Line)
- Connections: Bus terminal

Construction
- Structure type: Elevated

Other information
- Station code: AKB (JR East); JK28 (Keihin-Tōhoku Line); JY03 (Yamanote Line); JB19 (Sōbu Line)
- Website: Official website

History
- Opened: 1 November 1890; 136 years ago

Services
| Preceding station | JR East | Following station |
|---|---|---|
| Kanda Next clockwise | Yamanote Line | Okachimachi JY04 Next counter-clockwise |
| Kanda towards Yokohama | Keihin–Tōhoku Line Rapid (weekdays) | Ueno towards Ōmiya |
| Kanda towards Yokohama | Keihin–Tōhoku Line Rapid (weekends, holidays); Local | Okachimachi JK29 towards Ōmiya |
| Ochanomizu JB18 towards Mitaka | Chūō–Sōbu Line | Asakusabashi JB20 towards Chiba |
Location

There are two island platforms serving four tracks for the Yamanote Line and the Keihin-Tohoku Line on the 2nd level, and two side platforms serving two tracks for the Sobu Line Local service on the 4th level.

| 1 | Keihin-Tohoku Line | northbound for Ueno, Tabata, and Ōmiya |
| 2 | Yamanote Line | counterclockwise for Ueno, Tabata, and Ikebukuro |
| 3 | Yamanote Line | clockwise for Tokyo, Shimbashi, and Shinagawa |
| 4 | Keihin-Tohoku Line | southbound for Tokyo, Shinagawa, and Yokohama |
| 5 | Chūō-Sōbu Line | westbound for Ochanomizu, Shinjuku, Nakano, and Mitaka |
| 6 | Chūō-Sōbu Line | eastbound for Kinshichō, Funabashi, and Chiba |

Chest-high platform edge doors were installed on the Yamanote Line platforms in May 2015, to be brought into operation from 20 June 2015.

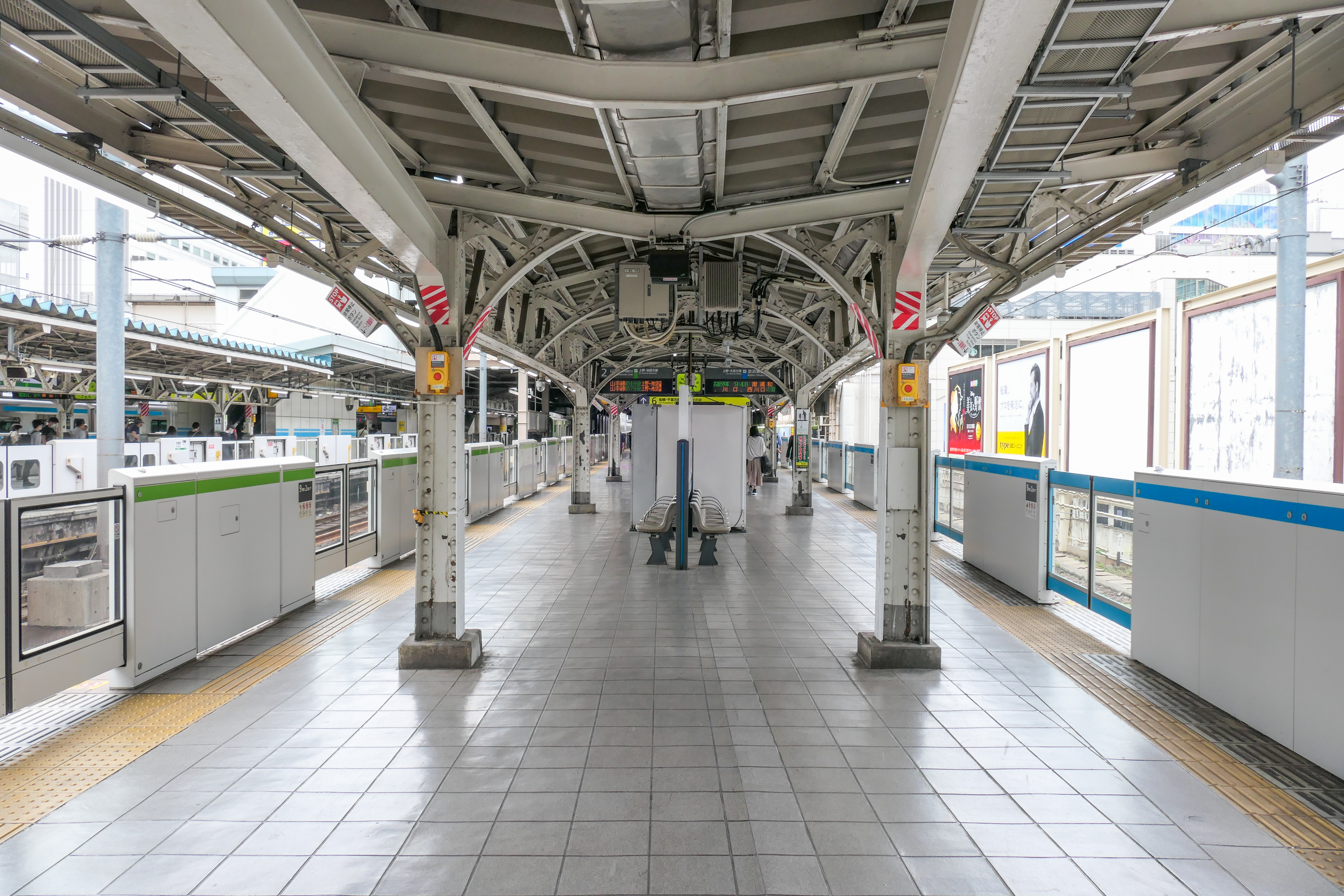
Platform 1 and 2 in June 2022

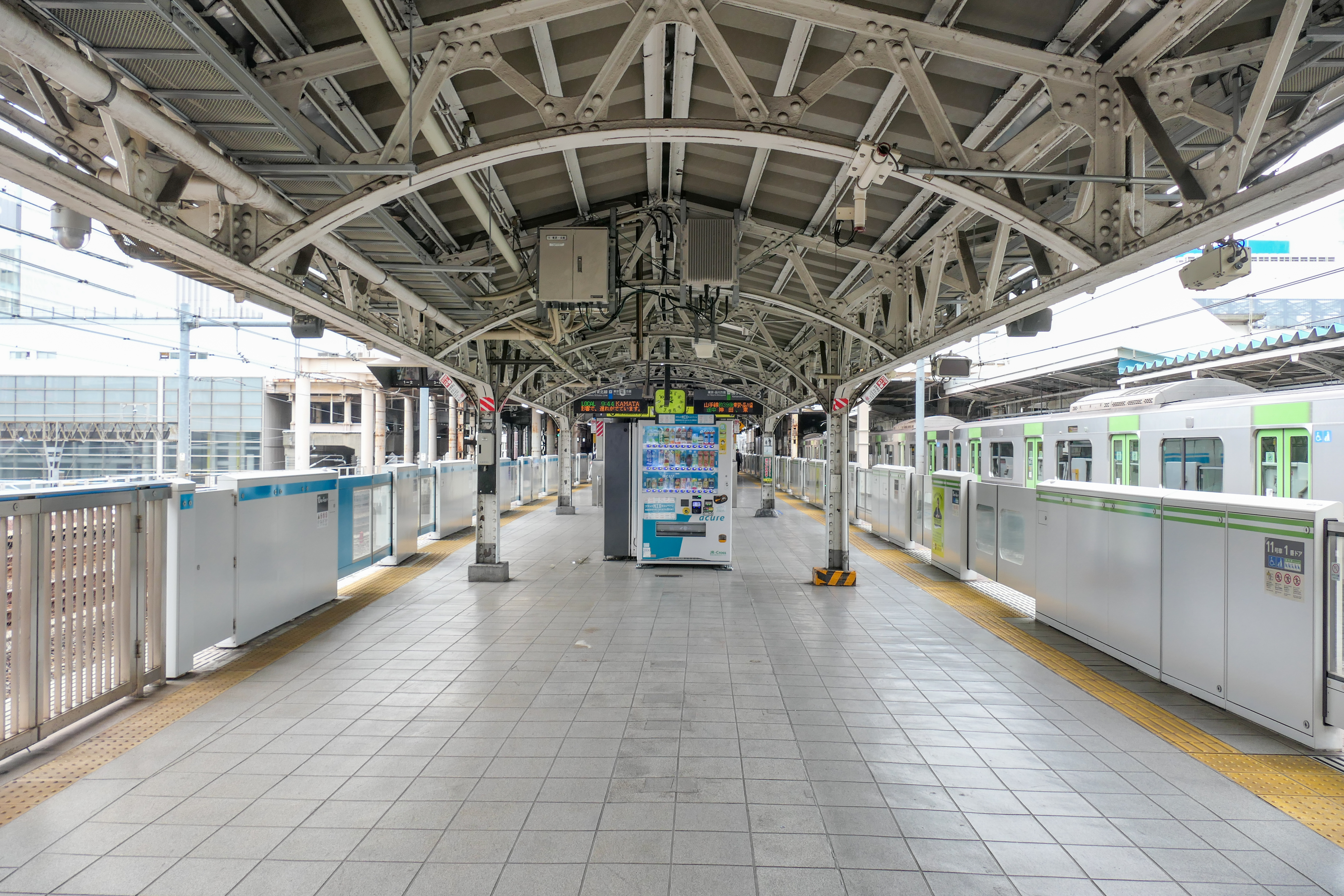
Platform 3 and 4 in June 2022

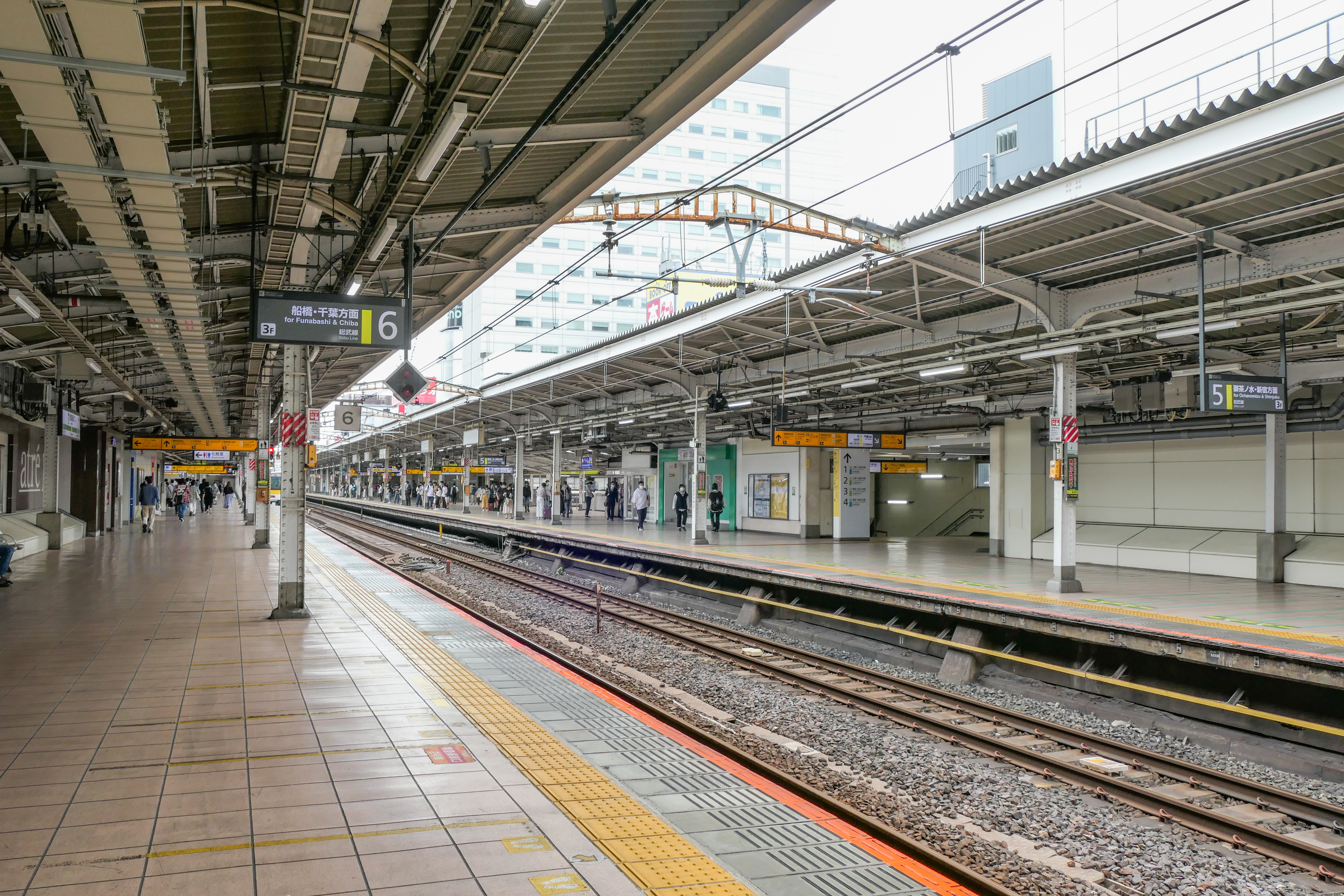
Platform 5 and 6 in June 2022

=== Tokyo Metro ===
Akihabara Station 秋葉原駅

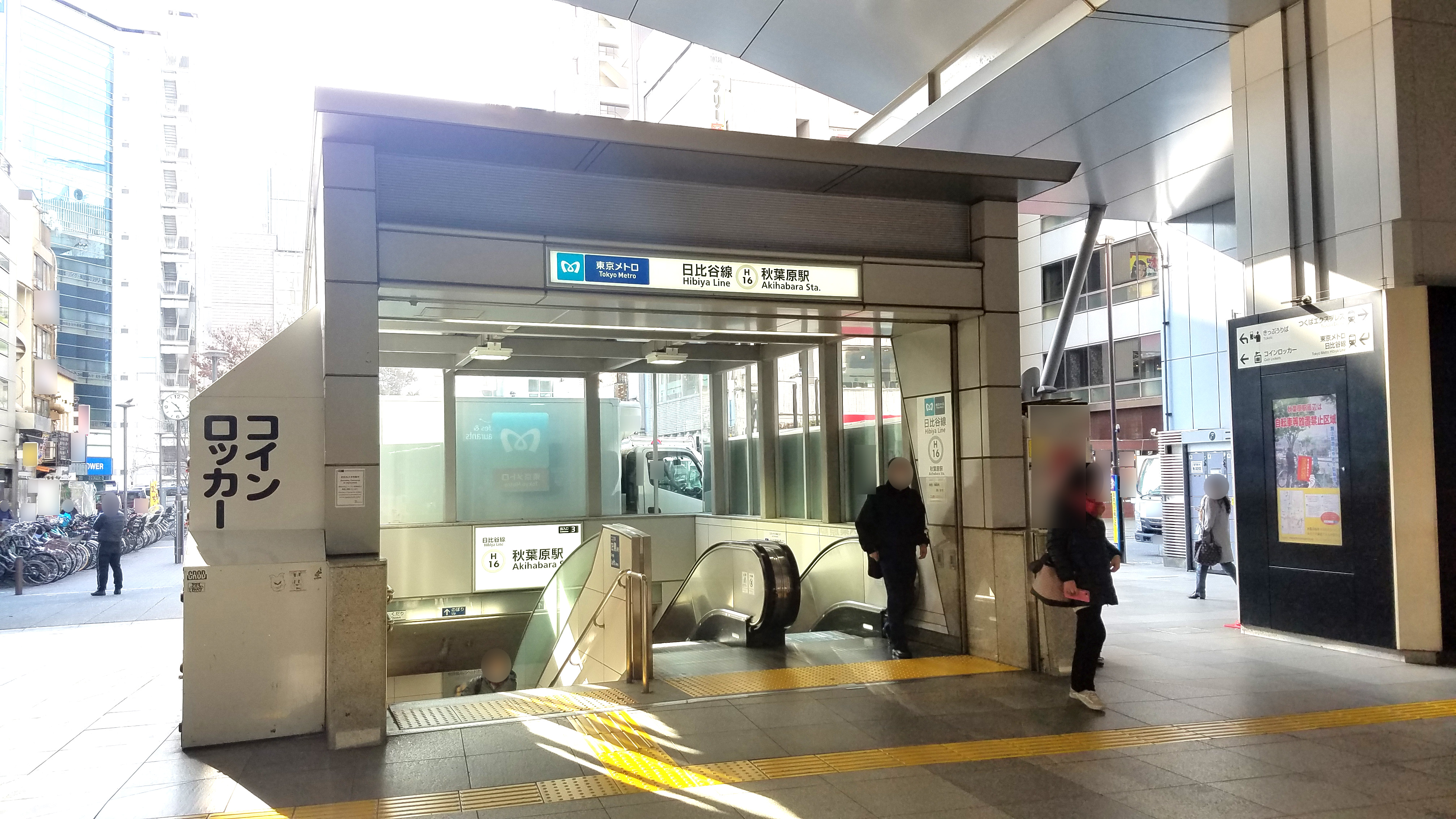
- Tokyo Metro Hibiya Line No. 3 Entrance in December 2021

General information
- Location: Kanda-Sakuma-chō; Chiyoda, Tokyo; Japan
- Coordinates: 35°41′55″N 139°46′31.8″E
- Operator: Tokyo Metro
- Line: Hibiya Line
- Platforms: 2 side platforms
- Tracks: 2
- Connections: Bus terminal

Construction
- Structure type: Underground

Other information
- Station code: H16

History
- Opened: 31 May 1962; 64 years ago

Services
| Preceding station | Tokyo Metro | Following station |
|---|---|---|
| Kayabachō towards Ebisu | TH Liner | Ueno towards Kuki |
| Kodemmachō towards Naka-meguro | Hibiya Line | Naka-Okachimachi towards Kita-Senju |
Location

There are two underground side platforms serving two tracks.

| 1 | Hibiya Line | for Ginza, Kasumigaseki, and Naka-Meguro |
| 2 | Hibiya Line | for Ueno and Kita-Senju; Tobu Skytree Line for Tōbu-Dōbutsu-Kōen; Tobu Nikko Line for Minami-Kurihashi |

The song "Koi Suru Fortune Cookie" by AKB48 is to be used as the departure melody on the Hibiya Line platforms from spring 2016.

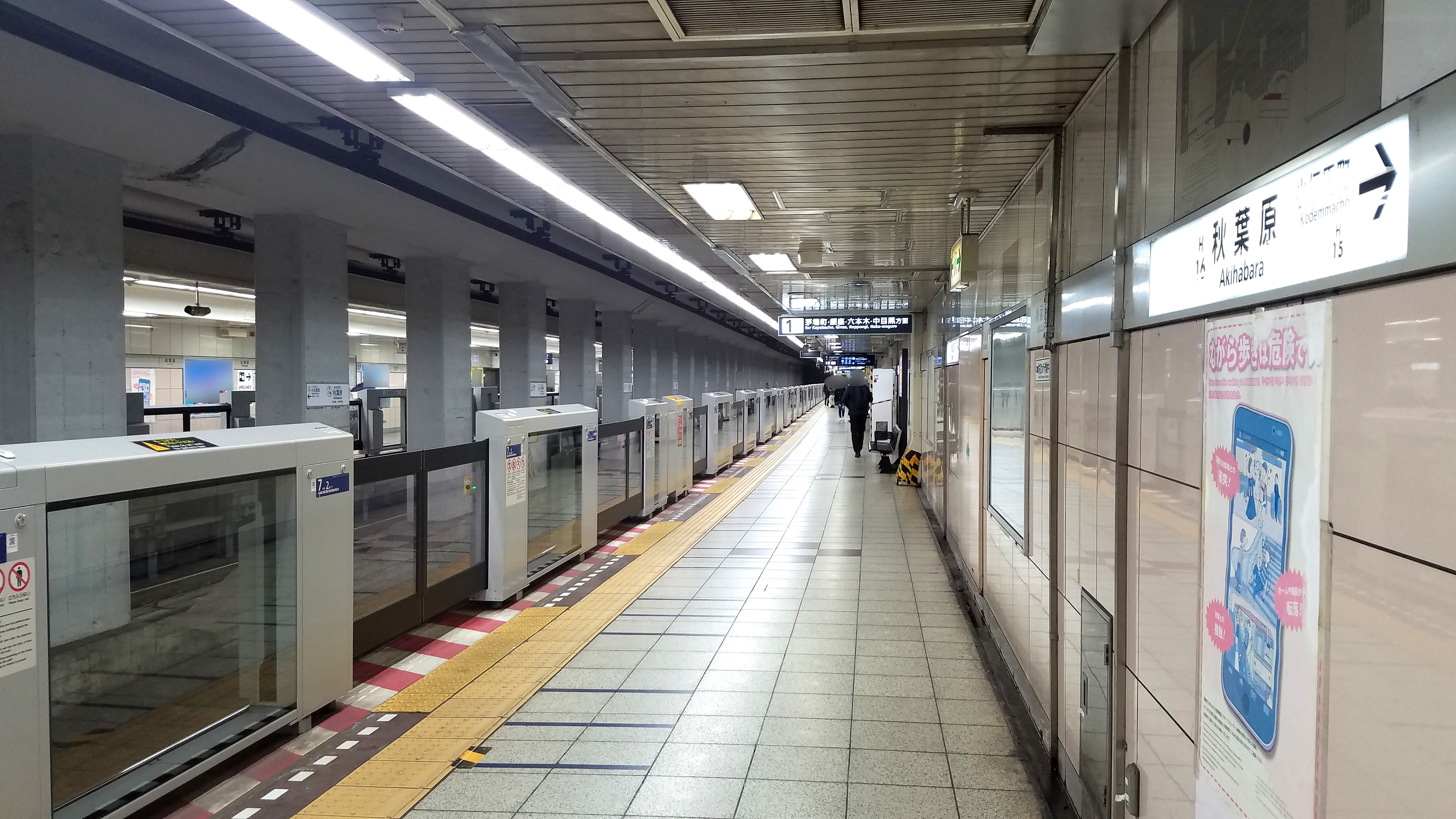
Hibiya Line platforms in December 2021

=== Tsukuba Express ===
Akihabara Station 秋葉原駅
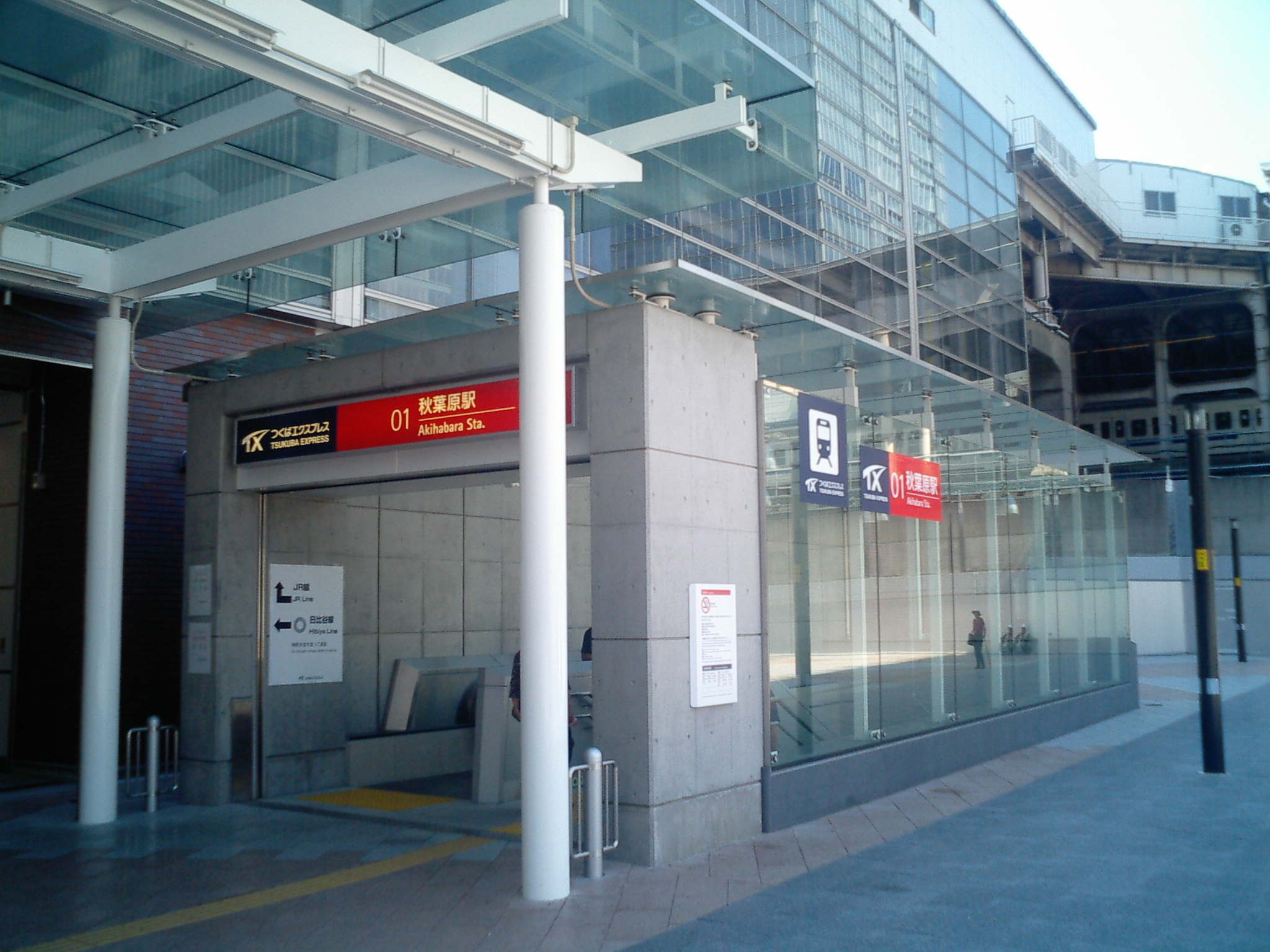
- Tsukuba Express No. 1 Entrance in October 2005

General information
- Location: Kanda-Hanaoka-chō; Chiyoda, Tokyo; Japan
- Coordinates: 35°41′55″N 139°46′27.2″E
- Operator: Metropolitan Intercity Railway Company
- Line: Tsukuba Express
- Connections: Bus terminal

History
- Opened: 24 August 2005

Services
| Preceding station | Tsukuba Express | Following station |
|---|---|---|
| Terminus | Tsukuba Express Rapid Commuter-Rapid Semi-Rapid Local | Shin-okachimachi (TX02) towards Tsukuba |
Location

There is an underground island platform serving two tracks.

| G | Street level | Exits/Entrances, connection to JR services |
| B1F | Upper Mezzanine | Fare control, station agent, ticket/Pasmo/Suica vending machines, FamilyMart, shopping, elevator to platform |
| B2F | Center Mezzanine | Staircases and escalators to Lower Mezzanine |
| B3F | Lower Mezzanine | Staircases and escalators to platform |
| B4F; Platform level | 1 | TX Tsukuba Express towards Tsukuba (Shin-Okachimachi) → |
| B4F; Platform level | Island platform, doors will open on the left or right |
| B4F; Platform level | 2 | TX Tsukuba Express towards Tsukuba (Shin-Okachimachi) → |

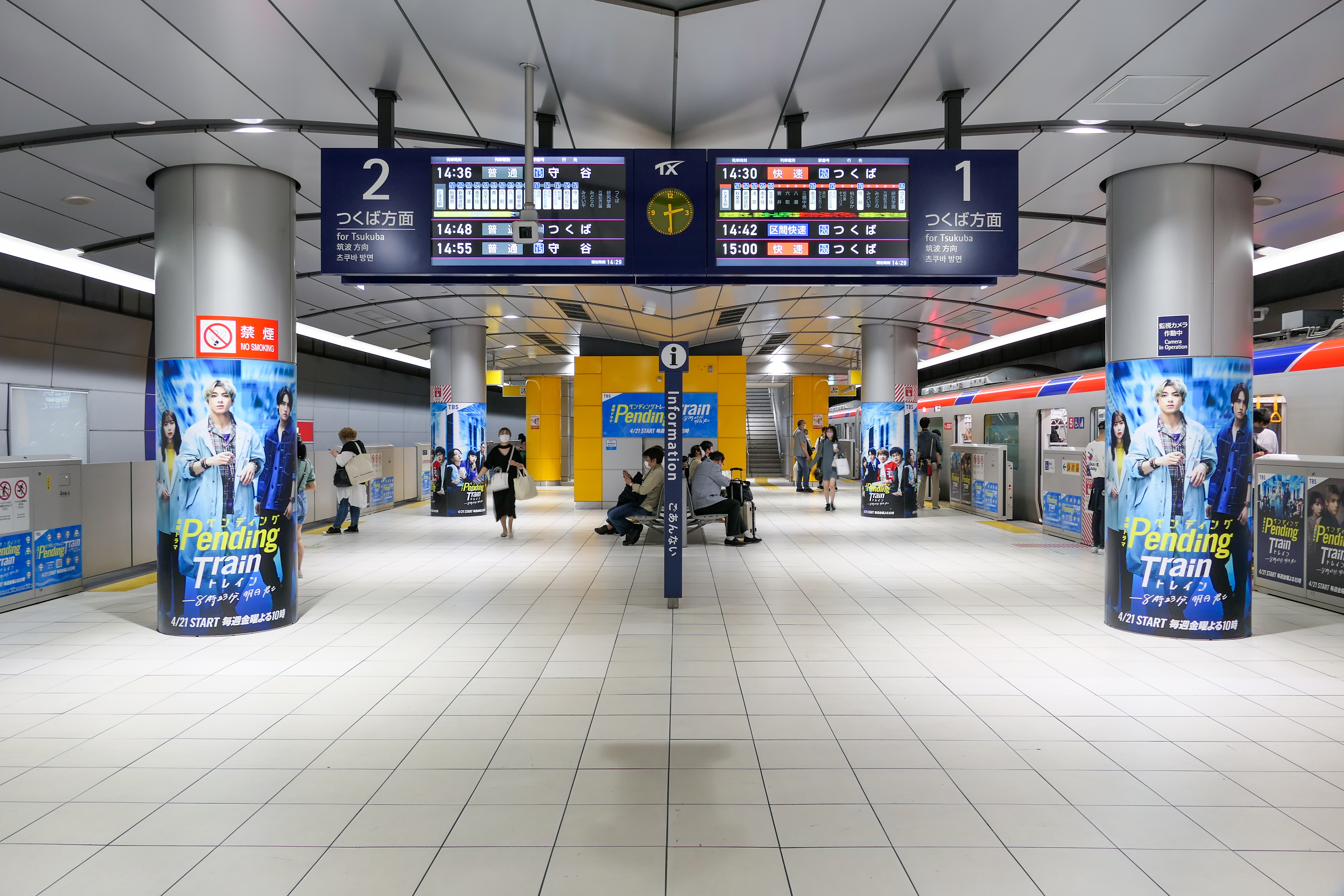
Tsukuba Express platforms in May 2023

== History ==
Akihabara Station was opened in November 1890 as a freight terminal linked to Ueno Station via tracks following the course of the modern day Yamanote Line.

It was opened to passenger traffic in 1925 following the construction of the section of track linking Ueno with Shimbashi via Tokyo Station and the completion of the Yamanote Line. The upper-level platforms were added in 1932 with the opening of an extension to the Sōbu Line from its old terminal at Ryōgoku to Ochanomizu, making Akihabara an important transfer station for passengers from the east of Tokyo and Chiba Prefecture.

The huge growth in commuter traffic following the Second World War caused considerable congestion and was only relieved with the construction of the Sōbu line tunnel linking Kinshichō with Tokyo, bypassing Akihabara.

The Hibiya Line subway station was opened on May 31, 1962, with the line's extension from Naka-Okachimachi to Ningyōchō.

The station facilities of the Hibiya Line were inherited by Tokyo Metro after the privatization of the Teito Rapid Transit Authority (TRTA) in 2004.

On August 24, 2005, the underground terminus of the new Tsukuba Express Line opened at Akihabara. The entire station complex, including the JR station, was also refurbished and enlarged in preparation for the opening of the Tsukuba Express.

Station numbering was introduced in 2016 with Akihabara being assigned station numbers JY03 for the Yamanote line, JK28 for the Keihin-Tōhoku line, and JB19 for the Chūō-Sōbu line. At the same time, JR East assigned a three-letter code to their major interchange stations; Akihabara was assigned the three-letter code "AKB".

TH Liner services on the Hibiya Line between Ebisu and Kuki commenced on 6 June 2020.

== Passenger statistics ==
In fiscal 2013, the JR East station was used by an average of 240,327 passengers daily (boarding passengers only), making it the ninth-busiest station operated by JR East. Over the same fiscal year, the Tokyo Metro station was used by an average of 122,576 passengers daily (both exiting and entering passengers), making it the 23rd busiest Tokyo Metro station. The passenger figures for previous years are as shown below. Note that JR East figures are for boarding passengers only.

| Fiscal year | Daily average | |
| Fiscal year | JR East | Tokyo Metro |
|---|---|---|
| 2000 | 137,736 | |
| 2005 | 171,166 | |
| 2010 | 226,646 | |
| 2011 | 230,689 | 119,184 |
| 2012 | 234,187 | 119,409 |
| 2013 | 240,327 | 122,576 |

== Surrounding area ==
The main attraction is the Akihabara electronics retail district to the north and west of the station.

- Iwamotocho Station ( Toei Shinjuku Line)
- Suehirocho Station ( Tokyo Metro Ginza Line)

== Bus terminal ==
=== Route buses ===
- Cha 51(茶51); For Ochanomizu Station, Hongō-sanchōme Station, and Komagome Station
- Aki 26(秋26); For Kanda Station, Iwamotochō Station, Kiyosumi-shirakawa Station, and Kasai Station
- Kazaguruma Akihabara Route; For Ochanomizu Station, Chiyoda City Office
- Kazaguruma Akihabara Route; For Ochanomizu Station, Chiyoda City Office

=== Highway buses ===
- My Town Direct Bus; For Tokyo Disney Resort, Shin-Urayasu Area
- Airport Limousine; For Haneda Airport
- Kanto Yakimono Liner; For Kasama Station, Mashiko Station
- For Takasaki Station, Shin-Maebashi Station, Maebashi Station, and Maebashi Bus Center
- Tono Kamaishi; For Shin-Hanamaki Station, Tōno Station, Kamaishi Station, Kirikiri, and Yamada
- Yuhi; For Tsuruoka Station, Amarume Station, and Sakata Station
- Southern Cross; For Kyōto Station, Ōsaka Station, Namba Station, and Osaka City Air Terminal (JR Namba Station)
- Tokyo Tokkyu New Star; For Kyōto Station, Ōsaka Station, Universal Studios Japan, Tennōji Station, Ōsaka Uehommachi Station, and Fuse Station
- For Toyama Station, Kanazawa Station, and Kenroku-en

== See also ==
- List of railway stations in Japan
