= Ryōgoku Station =

Railway and metro station in Tokyo, Japan

Coordinates: 35°41′44.66″N 139°47′38.24″E

JB21 Ryōgoku Station 両国駅

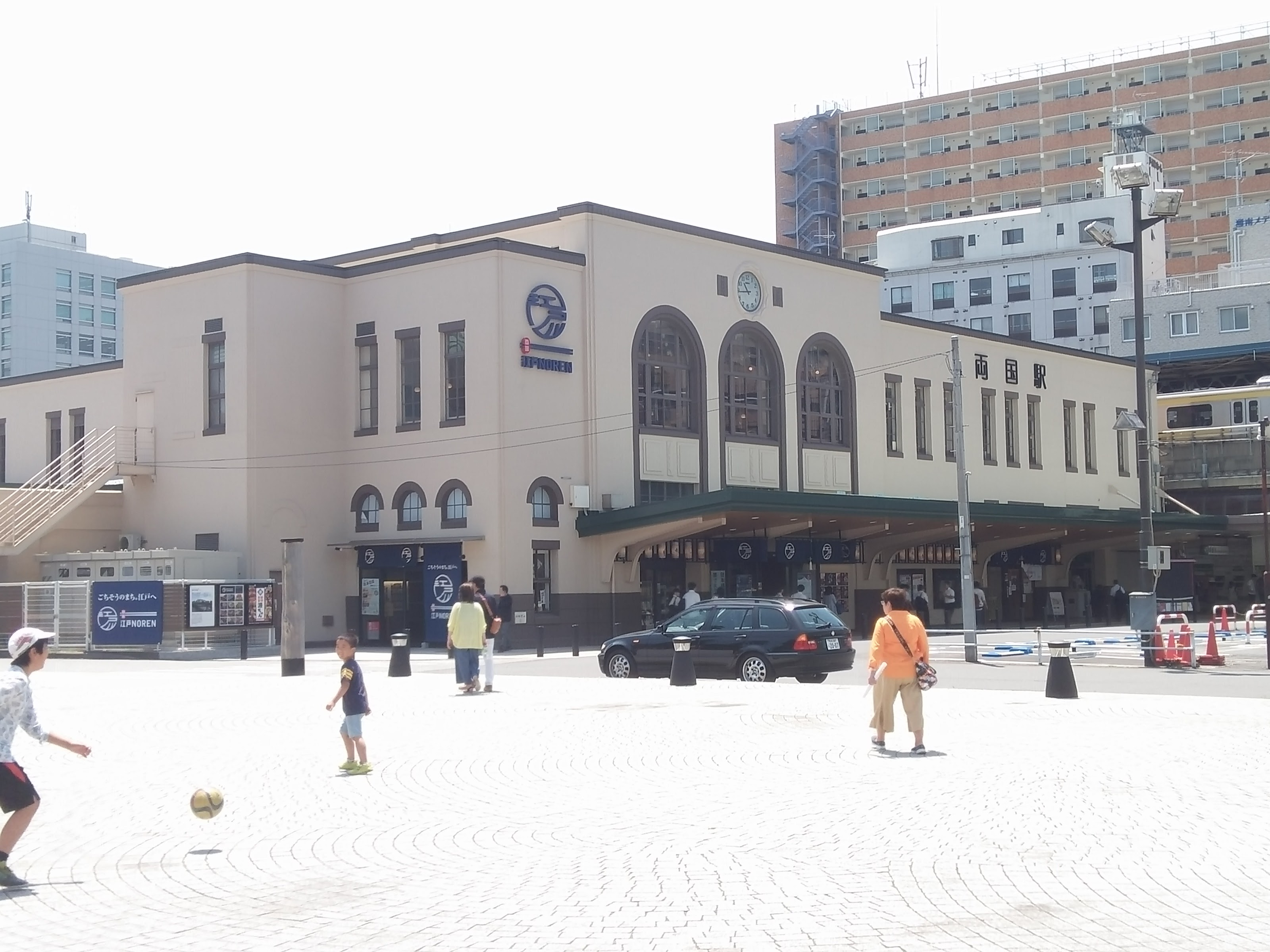
- Station building, May 2017

Japanese name
- Shinjitai: 両国駅
- Kyūjitai: 兩國驛
- Hiragana: りょうごくえき

General information
- Location: 1 Yokoami, Sumida City, Tokyo （東京都墨田区横網1丁目） Japan
- Operator: JR East; Toei Subway
- Lines: Chūō-Sōbu Line; Ōedo Line

Other information
- Station code: JB21 (Chūō-Sōbu Line); E-12 (Toei Oedo Line)

History
- Opened: 5 April 1904; 122 years ago
- Former names: Ryōgokubashi (until 1931)

Passengers
- JR East FY2010: 38,733 daily

Services
Preceding station	JR East	Following station
Asakusabashi JB20 towards Mitaka	Chūō–Sōbu Line	Kinshichō JB22 towards Chiba
Preceding station	Toei Subway	Following station
Kuramae towards Tochōmae	Ōedo Line	Morishita towards Hikarigaoka
Location
- Location within Special wards of Tokyo Location within Tokyo Bay and Bōsō Peninsula Location within Tokyo Location within Japan

Ryōgoku Station (両国駅, Ryōgoku-eki) is a railway station in Yokoami, Sumida, Tokyo, Japan, operated by East Japan Railway Company (JR East) and Tokyo Metropolitan Bureau of Transportation (Toei).

== Lines ==
The station is served by the JR East Chūō-Sōbu Line and the Toei Oedo Line, for which it is numbered as station E-12.

== Station layout ==
Ryōgoku Station consists of two separate stations that are considered an interchange. The elevated station is operated by JR East and the underground station is operated by the Toei Subway. Although they are an interchange, passengers must pass through ticket barriers and pay separate fares to switch between services.

=== JR East ===
Ryōgoku is a local stop on the Chūō-Sōbu Line. "Rapid" trains bypass the station through a tunnel whose portal is to the north of the main station complex. The Chūō-Sōbu Line services use an island platform serving two tracks, with platform 1 used for westbound trains to central Tokyo and beyond, and platform 2 for eastbound trains to Chiba. As a remnant of its former terminal days, there is also a third platform (platform 3) at a slightly lower level used for special services only and not used by regular services.

==== Platforms ====
1	Chūō-Sōbu Line	for Akihabara, Shinjuku, Nakano, and Mitaka
2	Chūō-Sōbu Line	for Kinshichō, Nishi-Funabashi, Tsudanuma, and Chiba
3	■ Boso Bicycle Base (B.B.Base)	Special platform used for B.B.Base reserved seat services

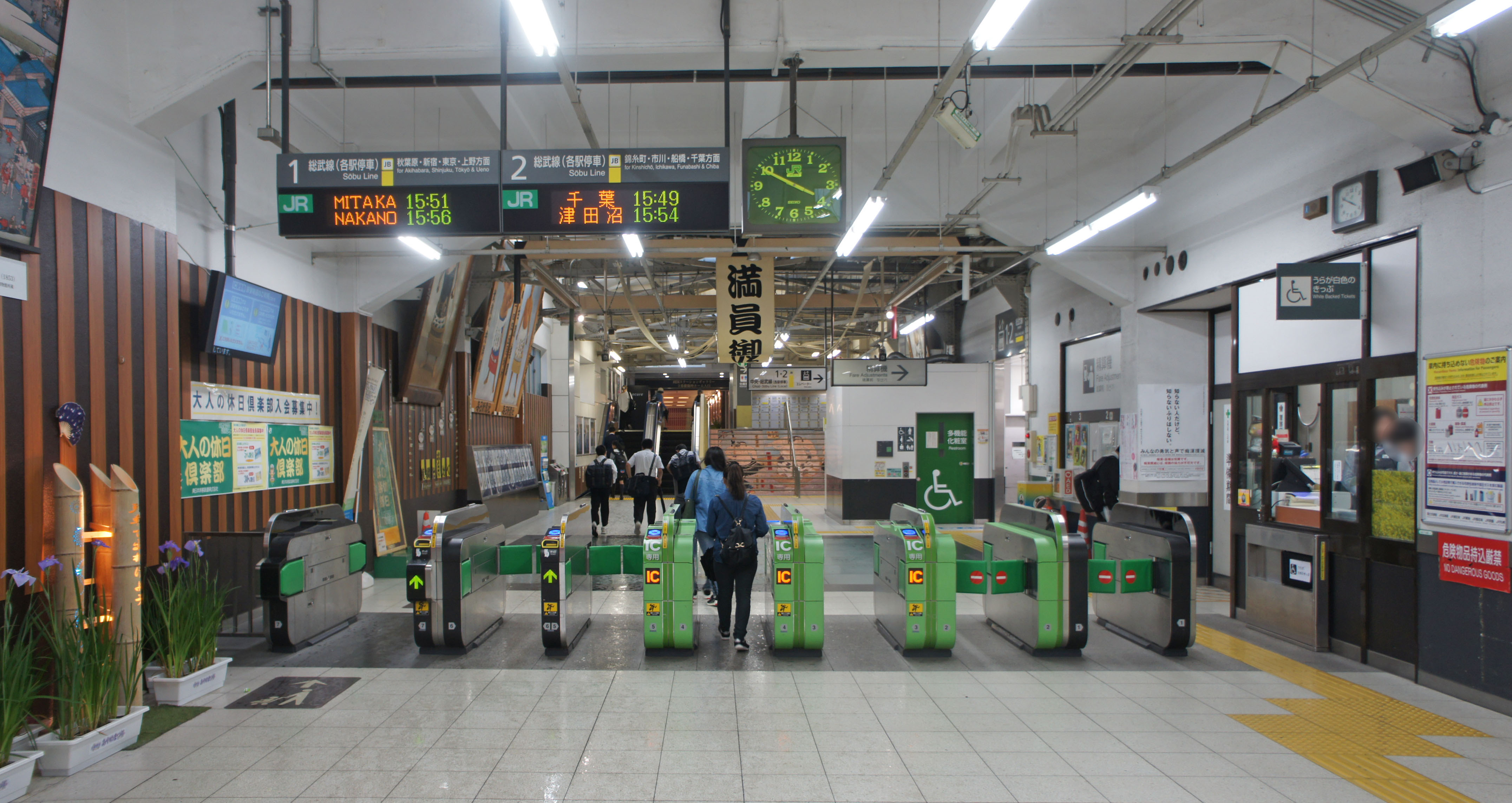
West ticket gates

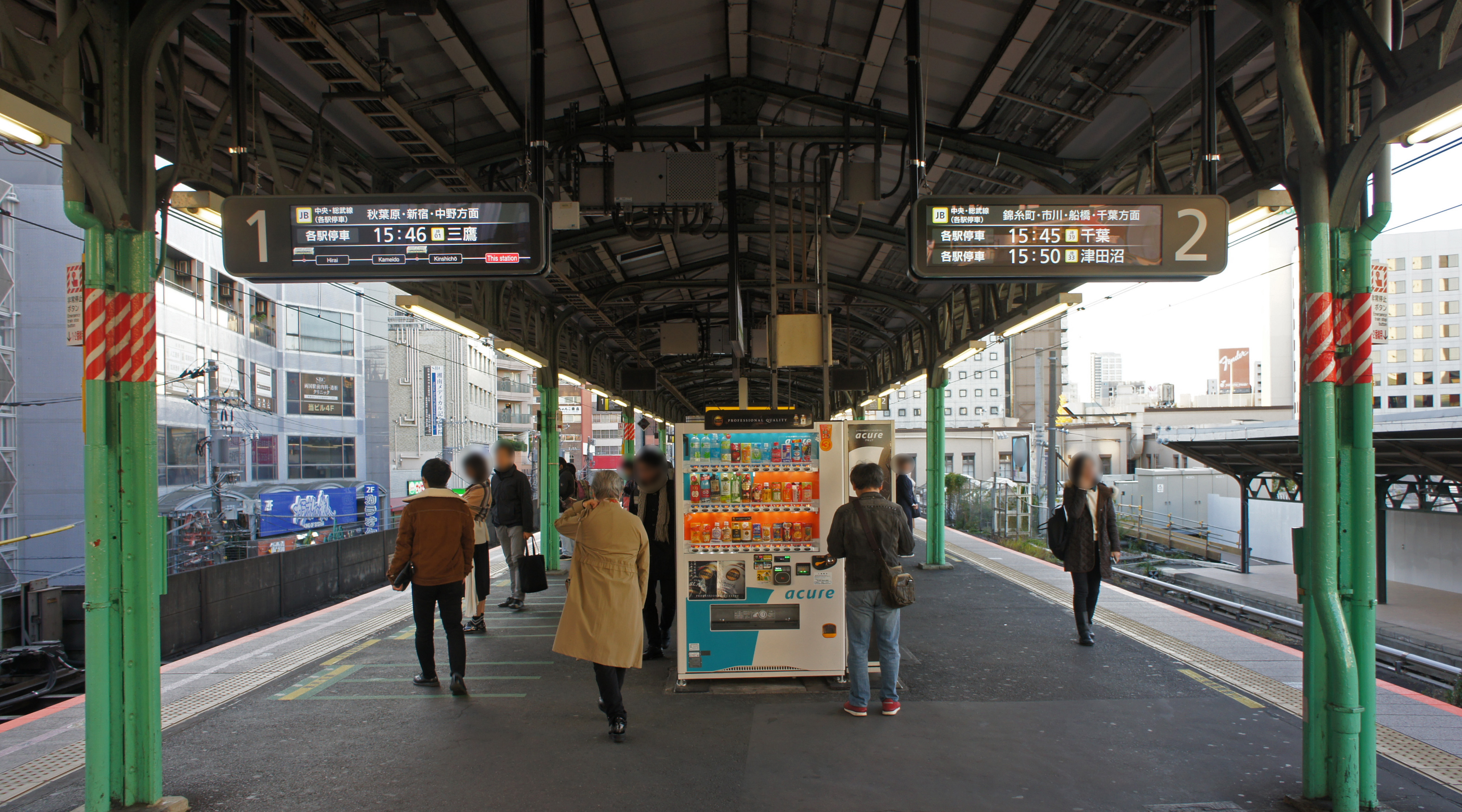
JR platforms

=== Toei ===
The Toei subway station lies on a north–south axis underneath Kiyosumi Street (清澄通り, Kiyosumi-dori) and has five exits, labelled A1-A5.

==== Platforms ====
1	Ōedo Line	for Iidabashi and Tochomae (change trains at Tochomae for Nerima and Hikarigaoka)
2	Ōedo Line	for Daimon and Roppongi

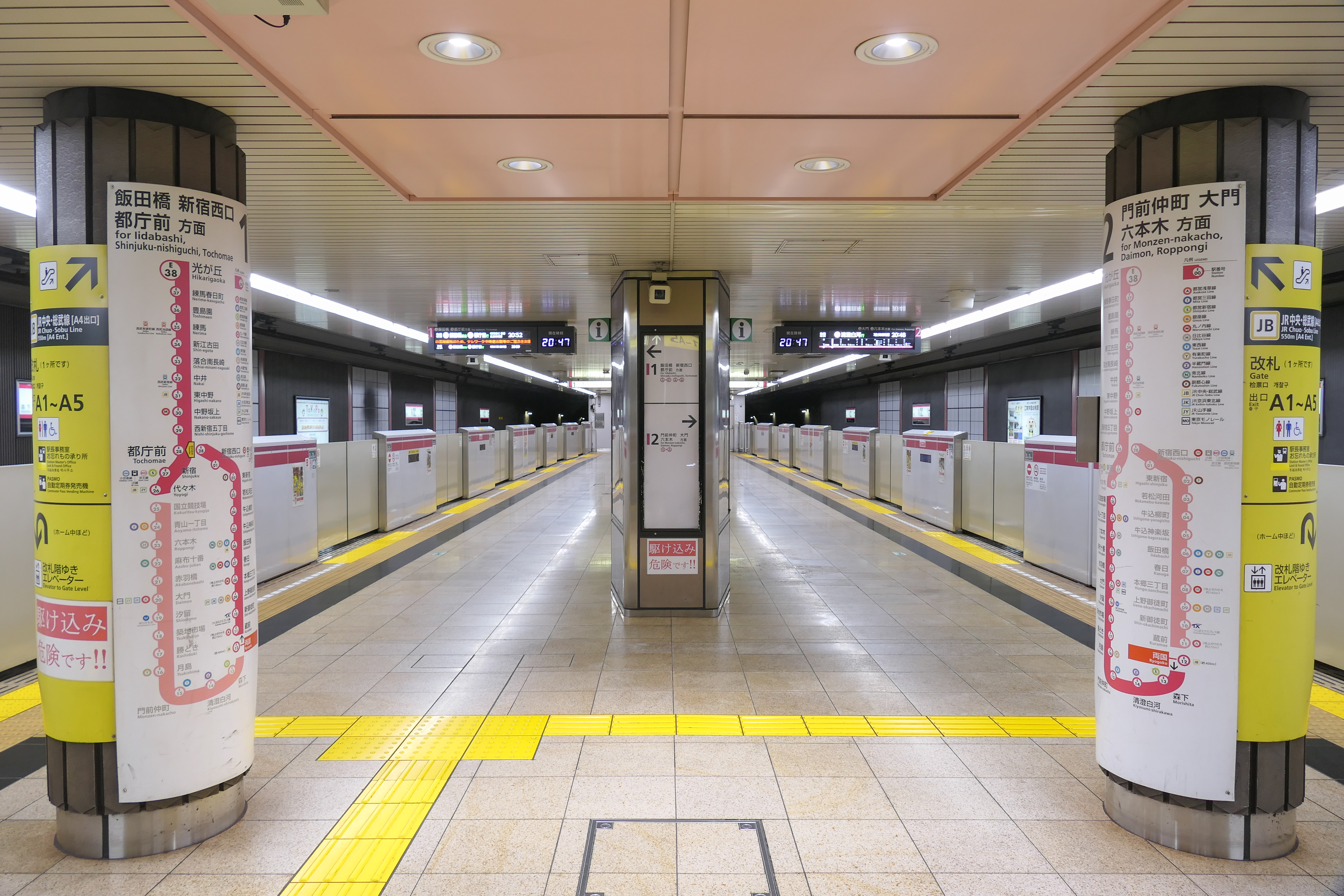
Toei platforms

== History ==
Ryōgoku Station opened on 5 April 1904 as Ryōgokubashi, gaining its current name in 1931. The Toei Ōedo Line station opened on 12 December 2000.

== Passenger statistics ==
In fiscal 2010, the JR East station was used by an average of 38,733 passengers daily (boarding passengers only).

== Surrounding area ==
Ryōgoku station is located at the southern end of the Yokoami neighbourhood and directly bordering on the Ryōgoku neighbourhood. The station is close to sites such as the Ryōgoku Kokugikan sumo stadium, the Edo-Tokyo Museum, and the memorial to the victims of the Great Kantō earthquake.

Other landmarks in the surrounding area include:

- Yokoamicho Park

== See also ==
- List of railway stations in Japan
