= Asakusabashi Station =

Railway and metro station in Tokyo, Japan

Coordinates: 35.6974°N 139.7847°E

JB20 Asakusabashi Station 浅草橋駅

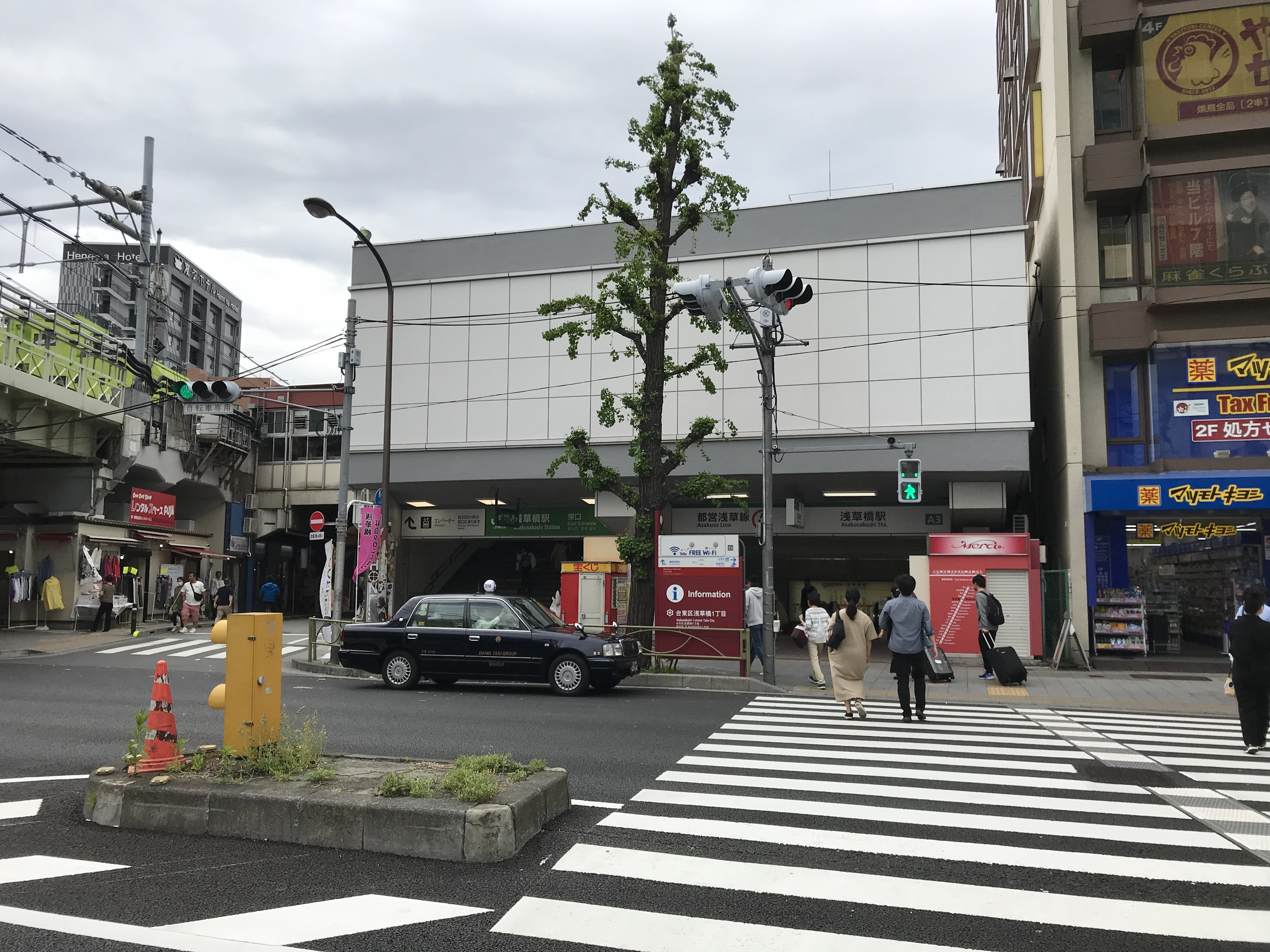
- The east side of the station in May 2019

Japanese name
- Shinjitai: 浅草橋駅
- Kyūjitai: 淺草橋驛
- Hiragana: あさくさばしえき

General information
- Location: 1 Asakusabashi, Taitō City, Tokyo; Japan
- Operator: JR East; Toei Subway
- Lines: Chūō-Sōbu Line; Asakusa Line
- Platforms: 2 side platforms (JR East), 1 island platform (Asakusa Line)
- Tracks: 2

Construction
- Structure type: Elevated (JR East); Underground (Asakusa Line)

Other information
- Station code: JB20 (Chūō-Sōbu Line); A-16 (Toei Asakusa Line)

History
- Opened: 1 July 1932; 94 years ago

Services
Preceding station	JR East	Following station
Akihabara JB19 towards Mitaka	Chūō–Sōbu Line	Ryōgoku JB21 towards Chiba
Preceding station	Toei Subway	Following station
Higashi-nihombashi towards Nishi-magome	Asakusa Line	Kuramae towards Oshiage
Track layout
Location
- Location within Tokyo Yamanote Loop Location within Tokyo wards area Location within Japan

Asakusabashi Station (浅草橋駅, Asakusabashi-eki) is a subway station on the Toei Asakusa Line operated by the Tokyo Metropolitan Bureau of Transportation, and a railway station above ground level on the Chūō-Sōbu Line at the same site operated by the East Japan Railway Company (JR East). It is located in the Asakusabashi neighborhood of Taitō, Tokyo, Japan. Its number on the Asakusa Line is A-16.

== Station layout ==
=== JR platforms ===
1	Chūō-Sōbu Line	for Akihabara, Shinjuku and Mitaka
2	Chūō-Sōbu Line	for Kinshichō, Funabashi and Chiba

JR Asakusabashi Station has two side platforms with two tracks between them. Platform 1 is for passengers going toward Akihabara and Mitaka Stations. Platform 2 serves those bound for Kinshichō and Chiba Stations.

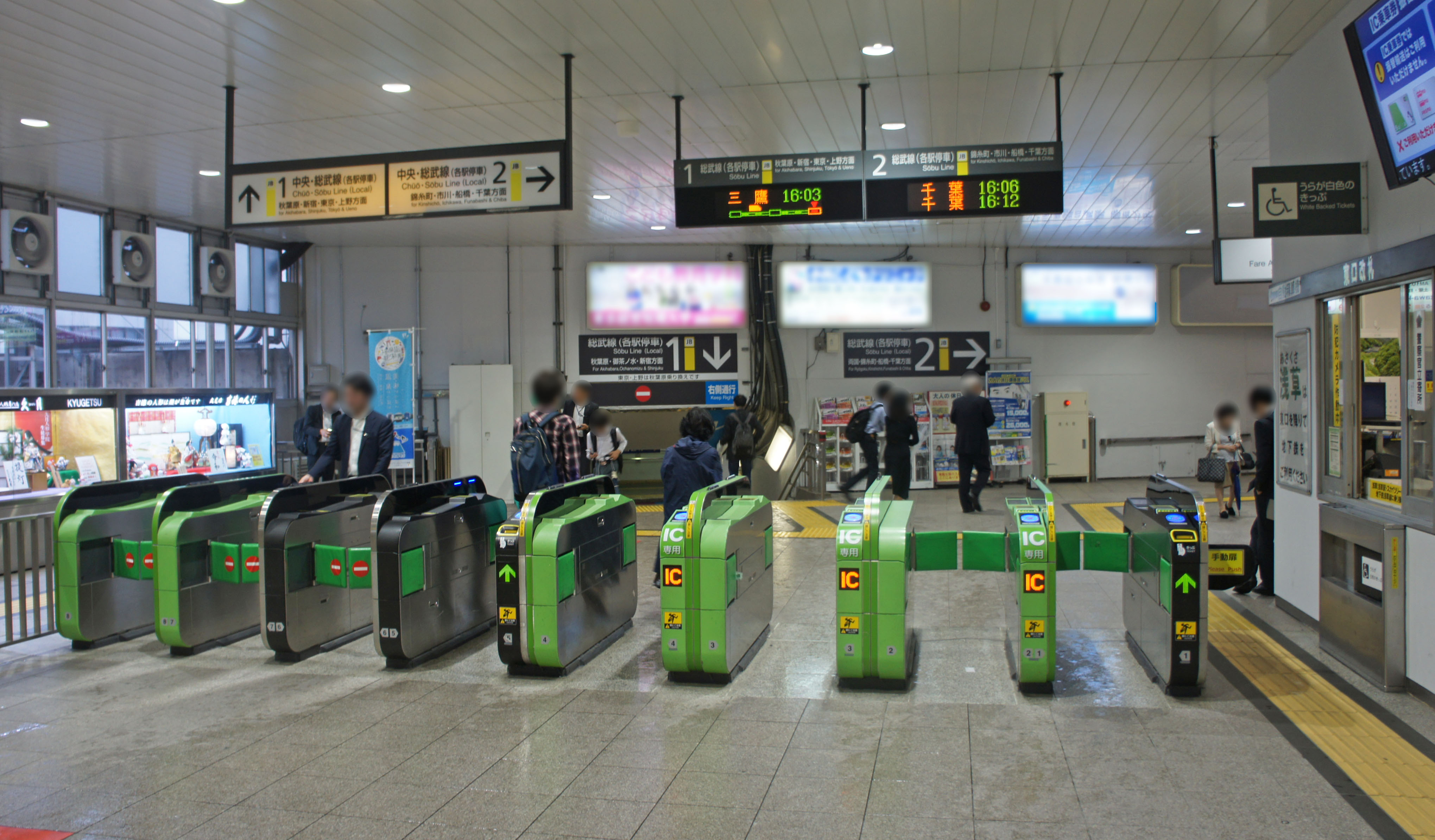
East ticket gates

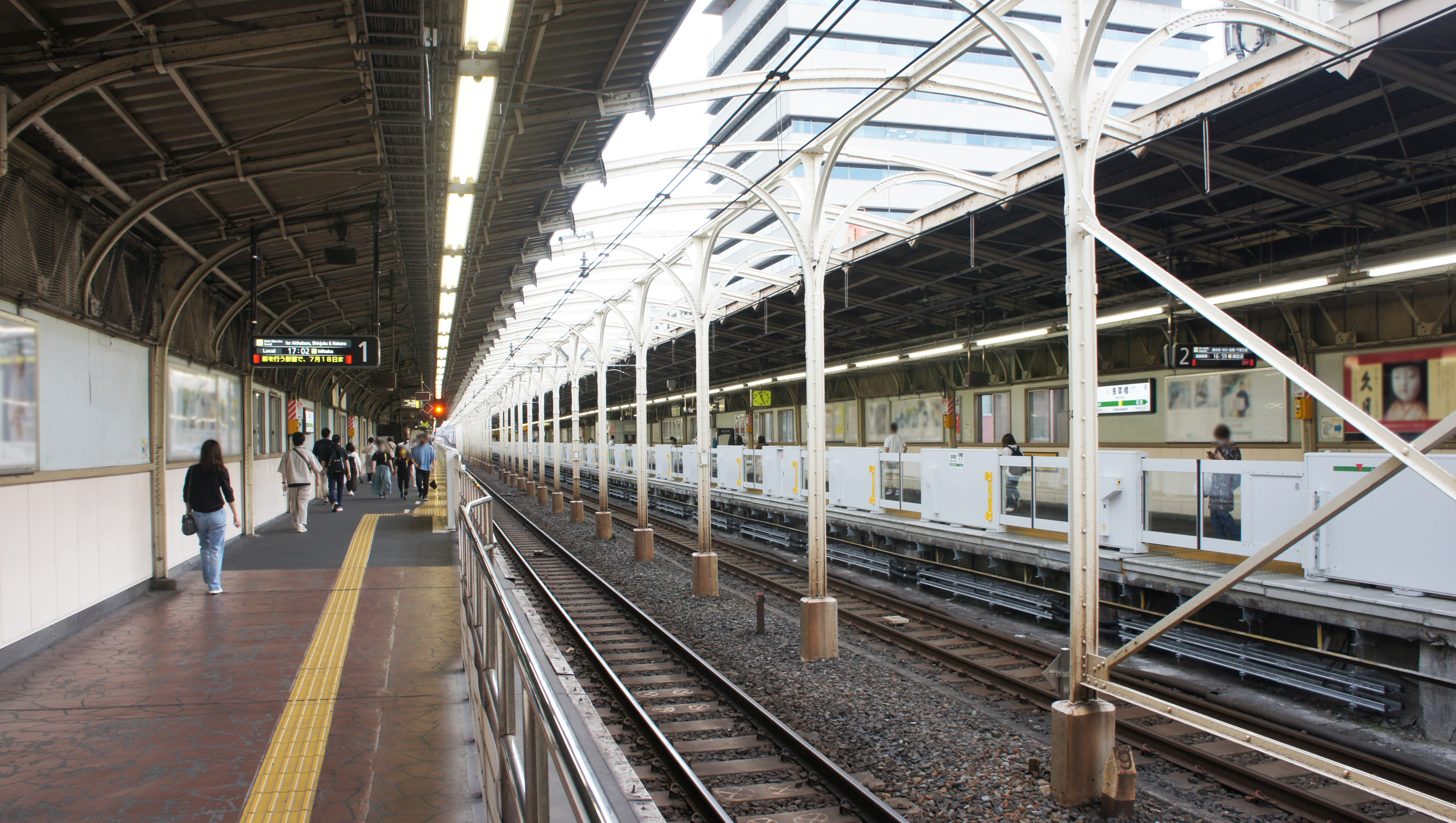
JR platform, 2021

=== Toei platforms ===
1	Asakusa Line	for Nihombashi, Shimbashi, and Nishi-magome; Keikyu Main Line for Shinagawa, Haneda Airport (International Terminal and Domestic Terminal), and Misakiguchi
2	Asakusa Line	for Asakusa and Oshiage; Keisei Line for Aoto, Keisei Narita, and Narita Airport (Terminal 2·3 and Terminal 1); Narita Sky Access Line for Narita Airport; Hokusō Line for Imba Nihon-idai; Shibayama Railway Line for Shibayama-Chiyoda

Underground, the Asakusa Line station has an island platform between the two tracks. Trains on Platform 1 go toward Nihombashi and Nishi-magome Stations, while those on Platform 2 depart for the terminal of the subway line at Oshiage Station; through trains continue onward from there.

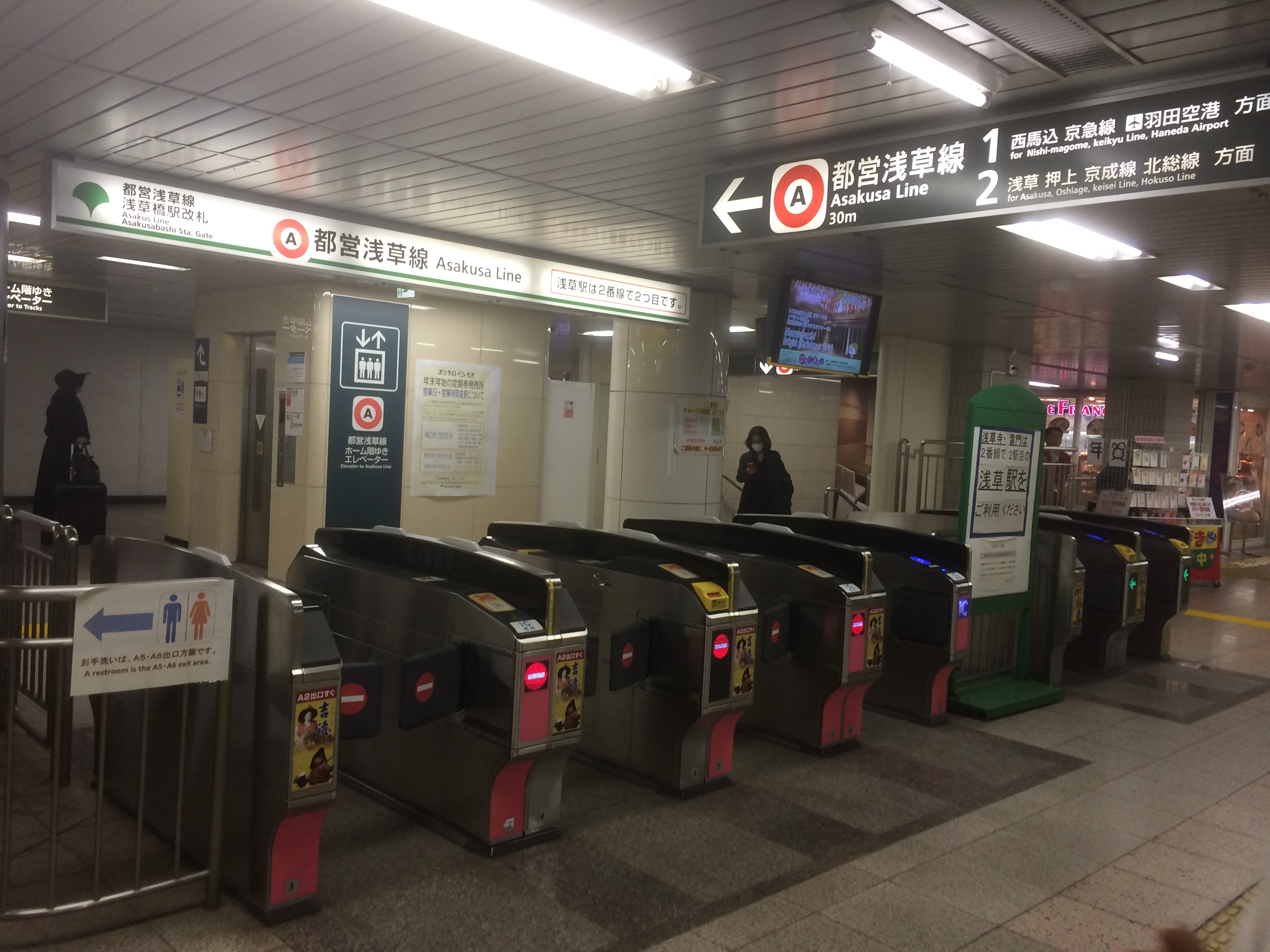
Toei ticket gates

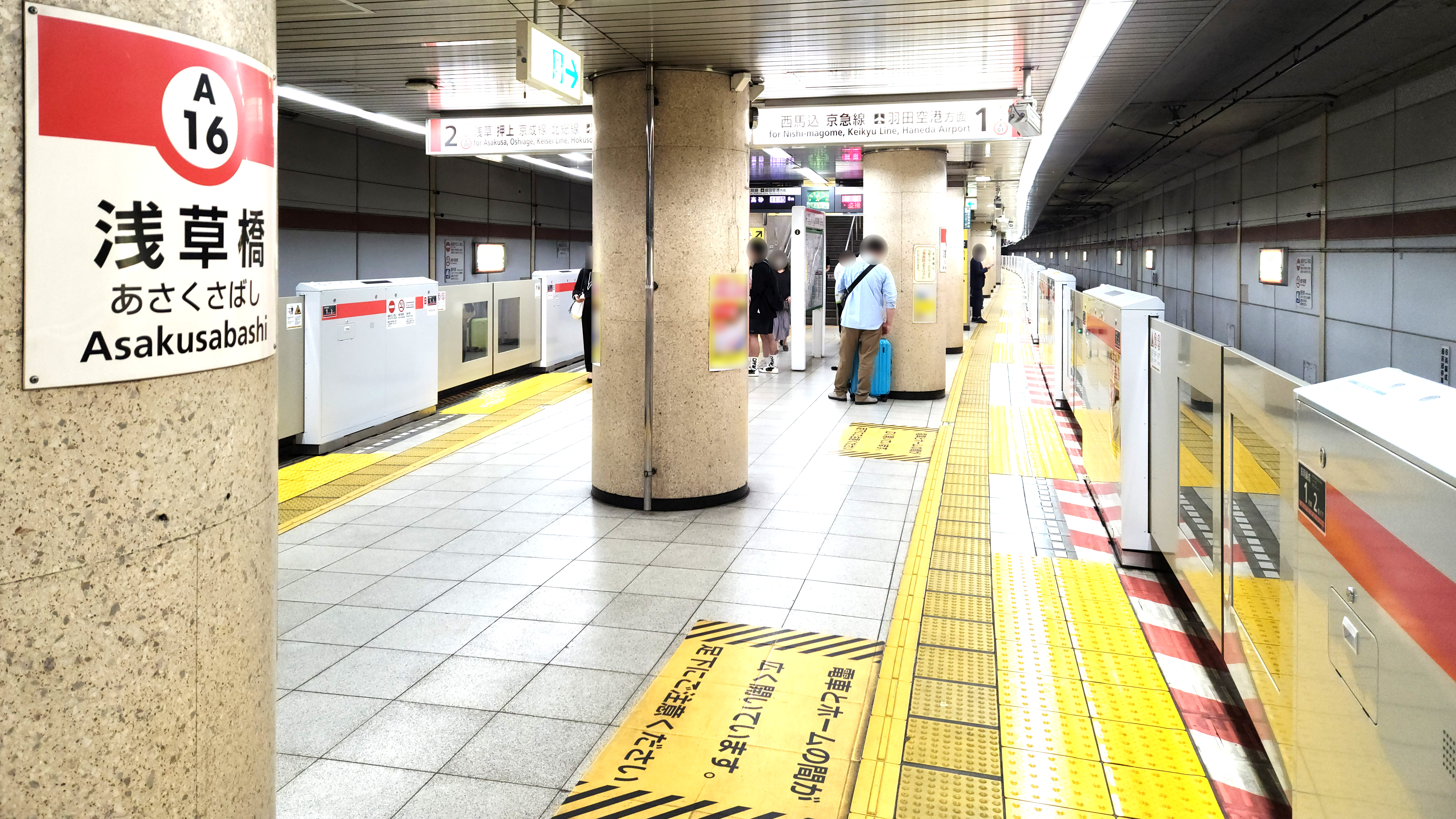
Toei platform, June 2023

== History ==
Asakusabashi opened on July 1, 1932, as a station on the Sōbu Line. On December 4, 1960, the subway station on what was then known as Toei Line 1 began to operate.

On November 28, 1985, Asakusabashi Station was firebombed by masked members of the Revolutionary Communist League, National Committee, who claimed that this action, as well as other acts of sabotage committed across several prefectures the same day were to support the 24-hour strike by the labour union Doro-Chiba protesting against the impending privatisation of Japanese National Railways (JNR). This incident did not affect operations on the Toei Asakusa Line as the underground platforms were not targeted. 48 persons were arrested during the investigation.

== Surrounding area ==
The station serves the neighborhood. Nearby are the Lycée Franco-Japonais de Tokyo, the Kanda River, and the Sumida River. The former Yanagibashi geisha quarter was located to the south of the station.

== See also ==
- List of railway stations in Japan
