= Chichibu Railway 6000 series =

Japanese train type

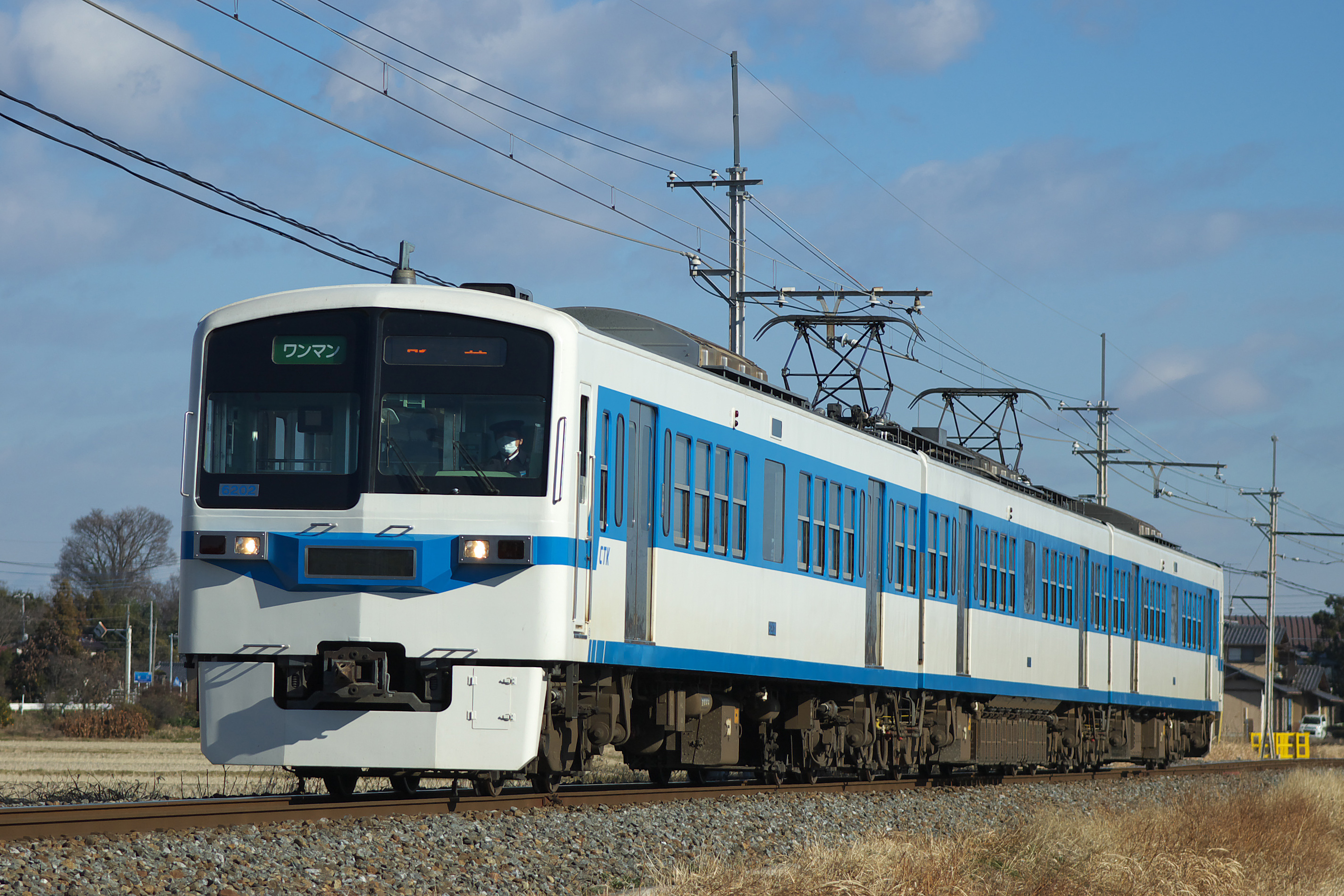
- A 6000 series set in January 2009
- In service: 2006 – Present
- Replaced: 3000 series
- Entered service: 15 March 2006
- Number built: 9 vehicles (3 sets)
- Number in service: 9 vehicles (3 sets)
- Formation: 3 cars per trainset
- Fleet numbers: 6001 - 6003
- Operator: Chichibu Railway
- Depot: Kumagaya
- Line served: Chichibu Main Line

Specifications
- Car body construction: Steel
- Car length: 20 m (65 ft 7 in)
- Doors: 2 pairs per side
- Electric system: 1,500 V DC
- Current collection: Overhead wire
- Track gauge: 1,067 mm (3 ft 6 in)

The Chichibu Railway 6000 series (秩父鉄道6000系) is an electric multiple unit (EMU) train type for express services on the Chichibu Main Line operated by the private railway operator Chichibu Railway in Japan since 2006.

== Formation ==
The three three-car sets are formed as shown below, with two motored ("M") cars and one non-powered trailer ("T") car.

DeHa (M2c)	DeHa (M1)	KuHa (Tc)
6001 (ex MoHa 230)	6101 (ex MoHa 229)	6201 (ex KuHa 1229)
6002 (ex MoHa 232)	6102 (ex MoHa 231)	6202 (ex KuHa 1231)
6003 (ex MoHa 234)	6103 (ex MoHa 233)	6203 (ex KuHa 1233)

The DeHa 6100 car is fitted with two lozenge-type pantographs.

== History ==
Three 3-car trains were converted from 2005 from former Seibu 101 series 4-car EMUs. Conversion involved sealing the centre pair of side doors and installing transverse seating displaced from Seibu 10000 series limited express EMUs when they were refurbished. The seats are arranged in facing bays, and no longer rotate.

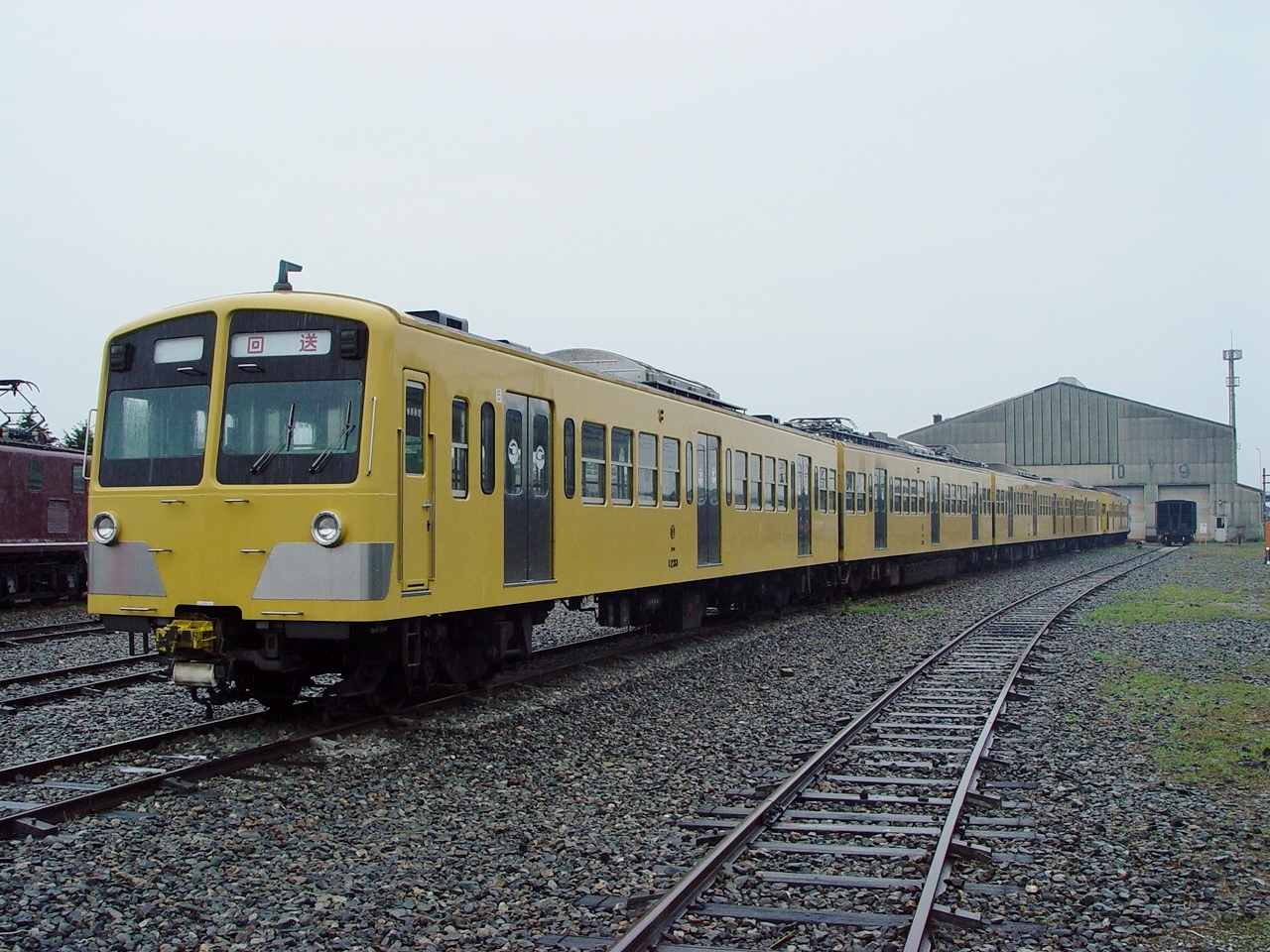
Former Seibu 101 series at the Chichibu Railway Hirosegawara Depot in May 2006 awaiting conversion to become 6000 series trains

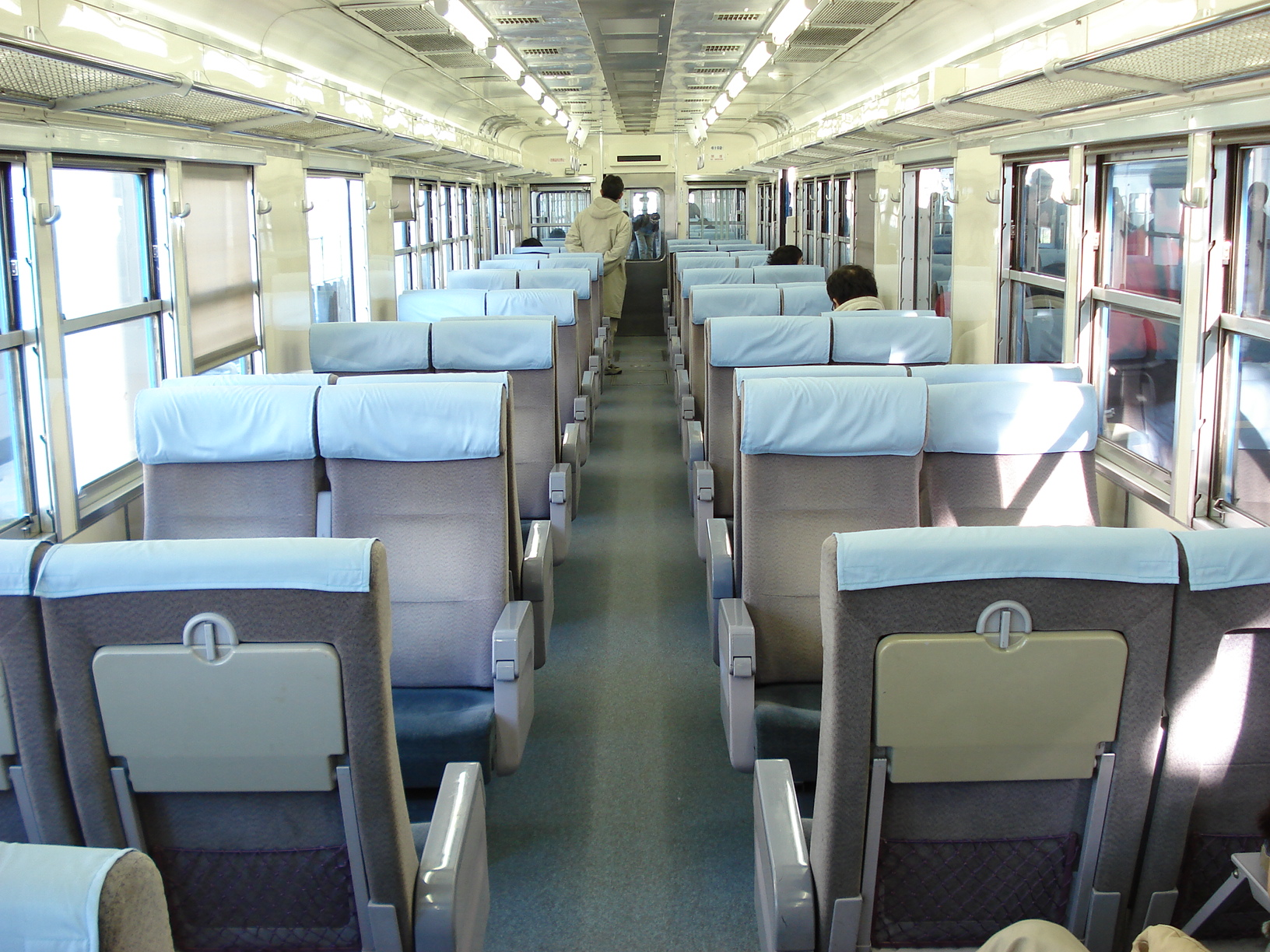
Interior view

== Special liveries ==
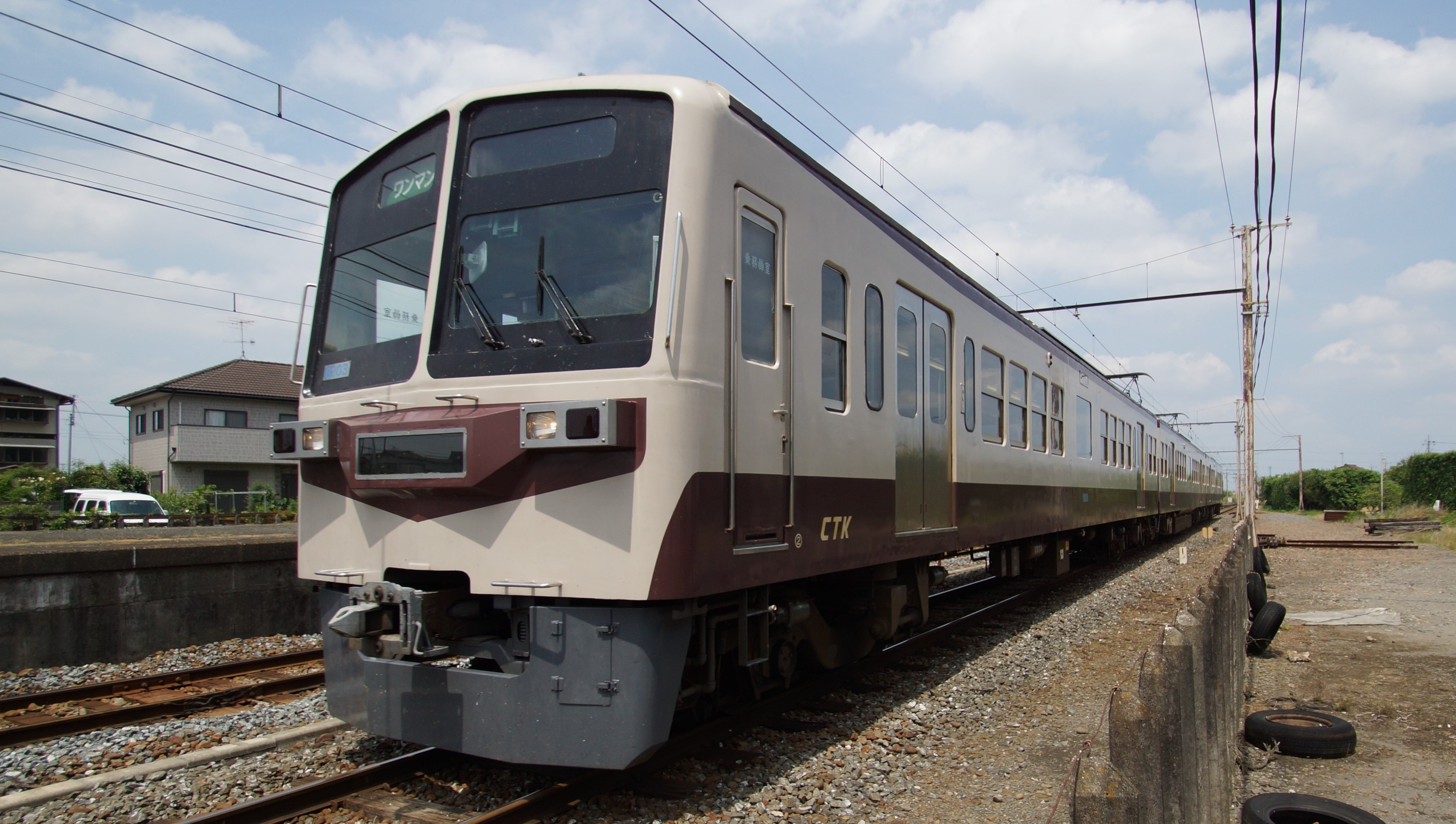
Reliveried set 6003 in June 2017

In October 2014, set 6003 was repainted in a revival beige and brown livery based on that carried by the former 300 series trains.
