= Seibu 30000 series =

Electric multiple unit of Seibu Railway

Seibu 30000 series Smile Train
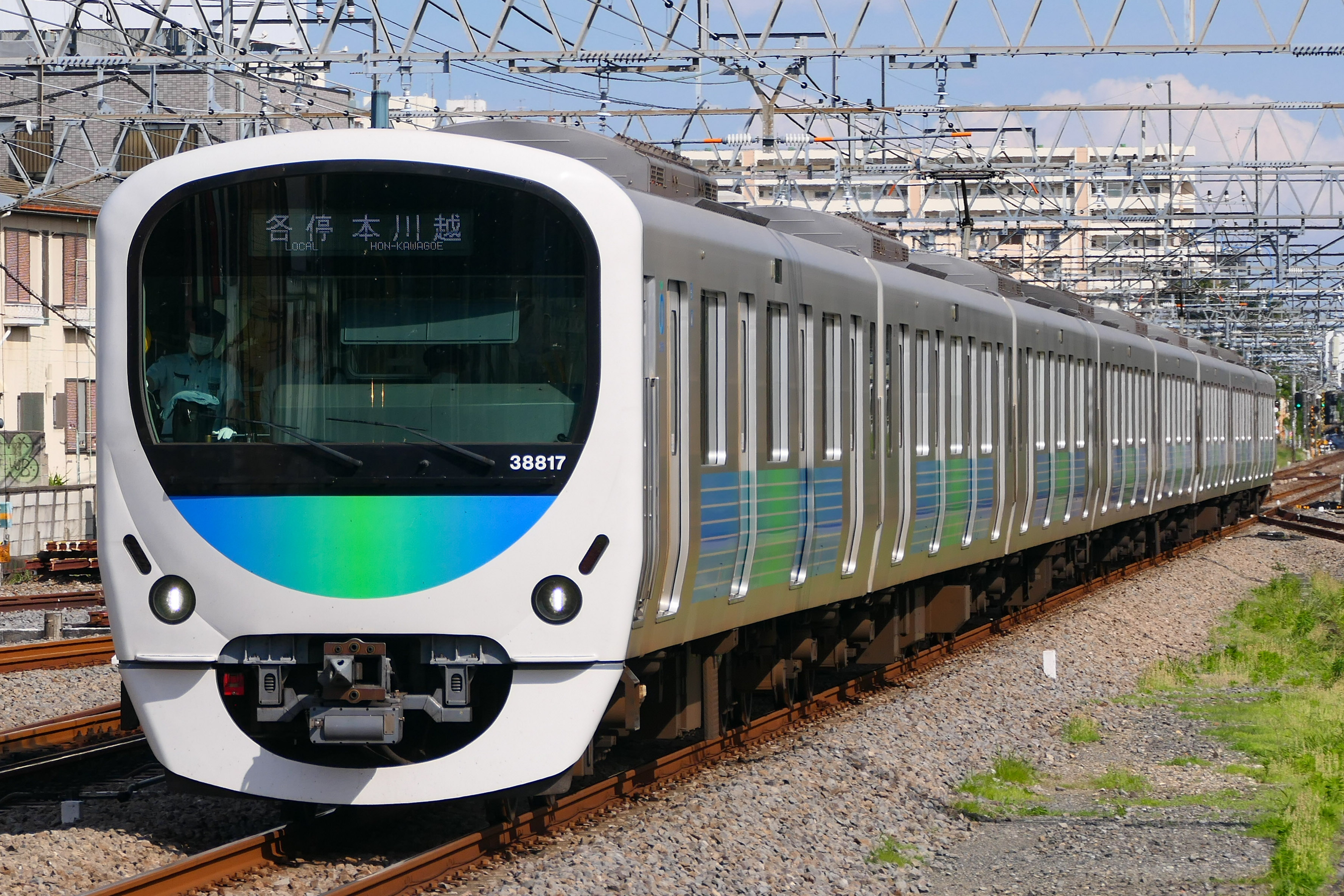
- 8-car set 38117 in June 2024
- In service: 2008–present
- Manufacturer: Hitachi Rail
- Built at: Kudamatsu, Yamaguchi
- Family name: Hitachi A-train
- Replaced: 101 series, 301 series
- Constructed: 2008–2016
- Entered service: April 2008
- Number built: 216 vehicles (30 sets)
- Number in service: 216 vehicles (30 sets)
- Formation: 2/8/10 cars per trainset
- Operator: Seibu Railway
- Depots: Kotesashi, Minami-Iriso, Musashigaoka, Tamagawa-Josui
- Lines served: Seibu Shinjuku Line; Seibu Ikebukuro Line

Specifications
- Car body construction: Aluminium
- Car length: 20,000 mm (65 ft 7 in)
- Width: 2,930 mm (9 ft 7 in)
- Doors: 4 pairs per side
- Maximum speed: 105 km/h (65 mph)
- Acceleration: 3.3 km/(h⋅s) (2.1 mph/s)
- Electric system: 1,500 V DC
- Current collection: overhead catenary
- Track gauge: 1,067 mm (3 ft 6 in)

The Seibu 30000 series (西武30000系) is an electric multiple unit (EMU) train type operated by the private railway operator Seibu Railway on commuter services in the Tokyo area of Japan. First introduced in April 2008, a total of six 10-car sets, eighteen 8-car sets, and six 2-car sets were built by Hitachi Rail between 2008 and 2016 to replace older three-door 101 series and 301 series sets. It is nicknamed the "Smile Train" (スマイルトレイン, Sumairu Torein).

== Design ==
Sets are formed as two-, eight-, and ten-car units, consisting of aluminium wide-bodied (2.93 m (9 ft 7 in)) 20 m (65 ft 7 in) long four-door cars with no end gangway doors. Six-car sets were also scheduled to be built by fiscal 2011, but none were ultimately delivered.

== Fleet ==
As of 10 November 2021, the fleet consists of 6 ten-car sets, 18 eight-car sets, and six two-car sets, based at Kotesashi, Minami-Iriso, Musashigaoka, and Tamagawa-Josui depots for use on Seibu Shinjuku Line and Seibu Ikebukuro Line workings.

The last set ordered, eight-car set 38118, was delivered in June 2016, bring the total size of the fleet to 216 vehicles (30 sets).

== Formations ==
Sets are formed as shown below.

=== 2-car sets ===
The six 2-car sets, numbered 32101 to 32106, are formed as follows, with car 1 at the Hanno end.

| Car No. | 1 | 2 |
|---|---|---|
| Designation | Mc | Tc |
| Numbering | 32100 | 32200 |

- The Mc cars are equipped with two single-arm pantographs.

=== 8-car sets ===
The eighteen 8-car sets, numbered 38101 to 38118, are formed as follows, with car 1 at the Hanno end.

| Car No. | 1 | 2 | 3 | 4 | 5 | 6 | 7 | 8 |
|---|---|---|---|---|---|---|---|---|
| Designation | Tc1 | M1 | M2 | T1 | T3 | M5 | M6 | Tc2 |
| Numbering | 38100 | 38200 | 38300 | 38400 | 38500 | 38600 | 38700 | 38800 |

- The M1 and M5 cars are each equipped with one single-arm pantograph.

=== 10-car sets ===
The six 10-car sets, numbered 30101 to 30106, are formed as follows, with car 1 at the Hanno end.

| Car No. | 1 | 2 | 3 | 4 | 5 | 6 | 7 | 8 | 9 | 10 |
|---|---|---|---|---|---|---|---|---|---|---|
| Designation | Tc1 | M1 | M2 | T1 | M3 | T2 | T3 | M5 | M6 | Tc2 |
| Numbering | 30100 | 30200 | 30300 | 30400 | 30500 | 30600 | 30700 | 30800 | 30900 | 30000 |

- The M1, M3 and M5 cars are each equipped with one single-arm pantograph.

== Interior ==
Seating consists of longitudinal bench seating throughout. Wheelchair spaces are provided in the two outermost cars at each end of eight-car sets and in the 32100 cars of two-car sets. Priority seats are provided at the end of each car. Sets built from fiscal 2013 feature LED lighting and transparent overhead luggage racks in place of the earlier stainless steel pipe racks.

=== Batches 1–6 ===
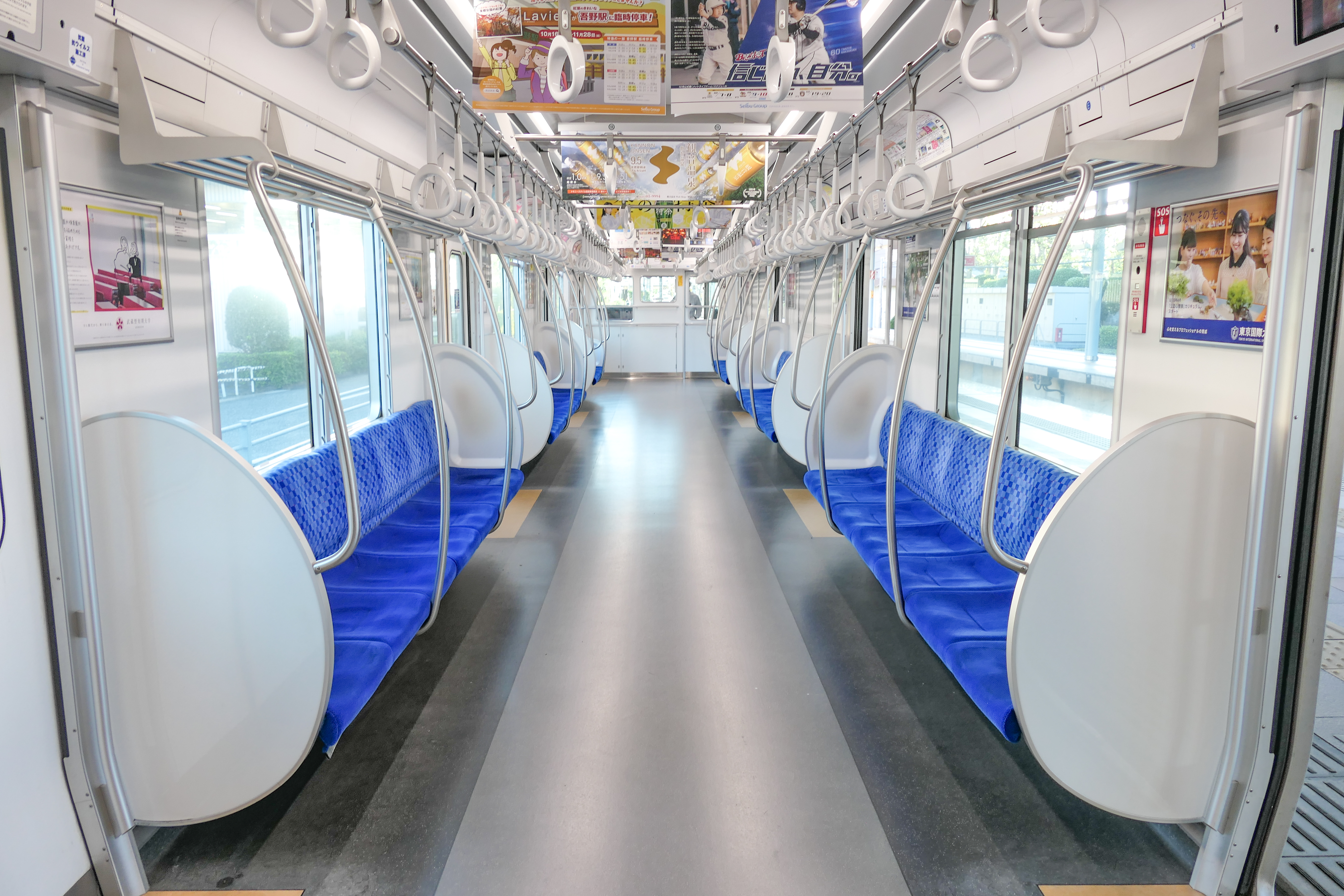
Interior

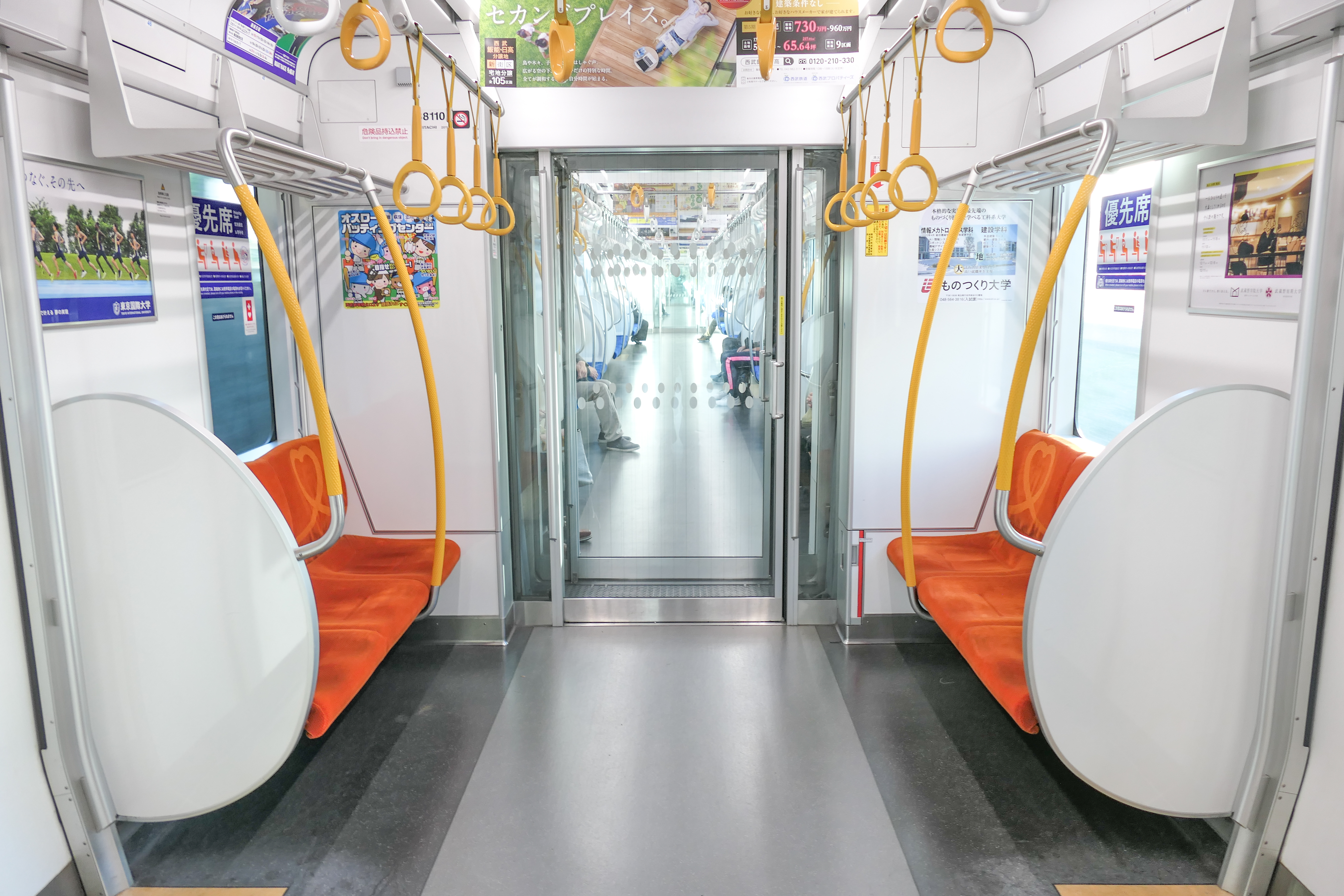
Priority seating

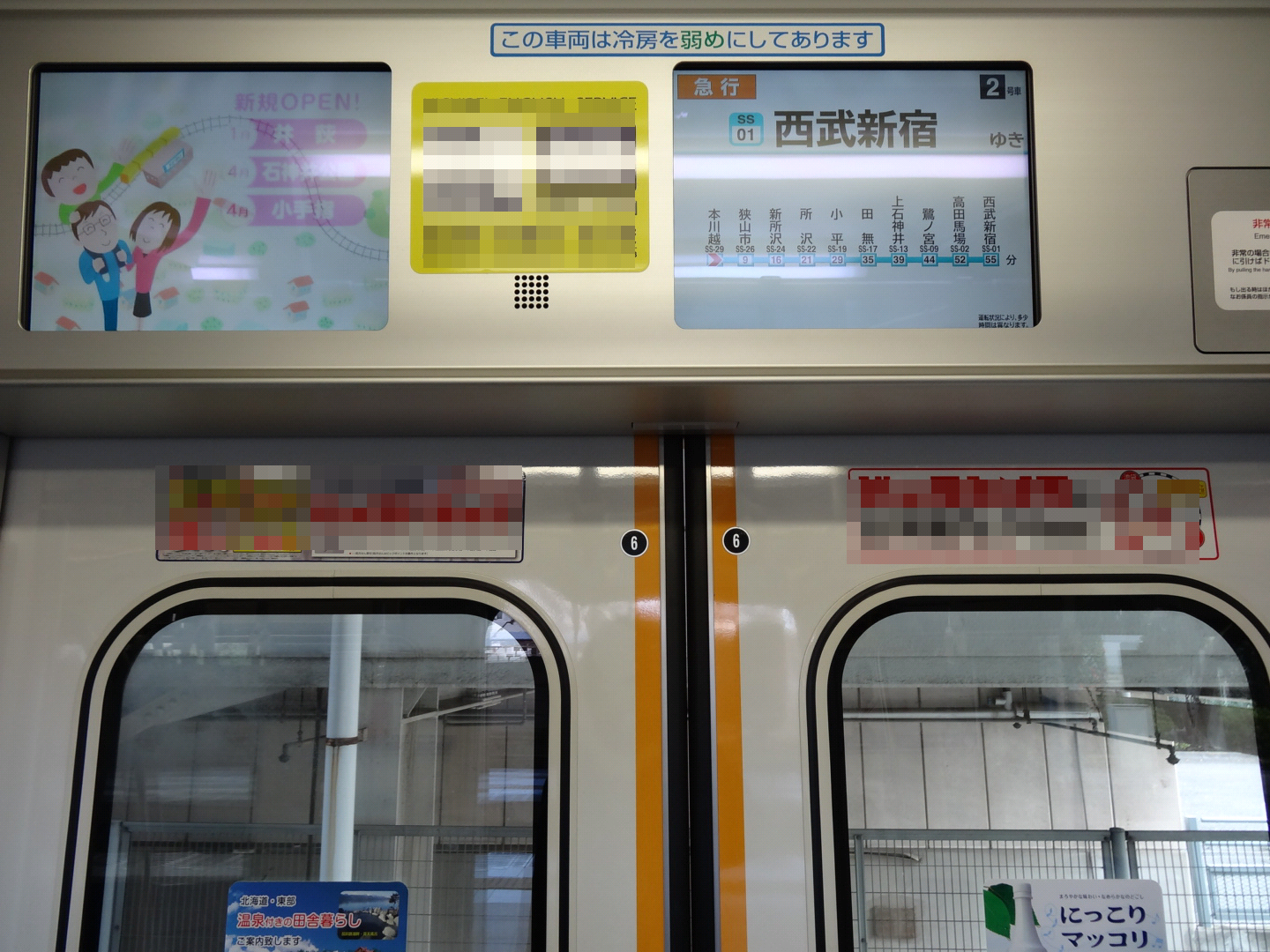
LCD information display

=== Batches 7–10 ===
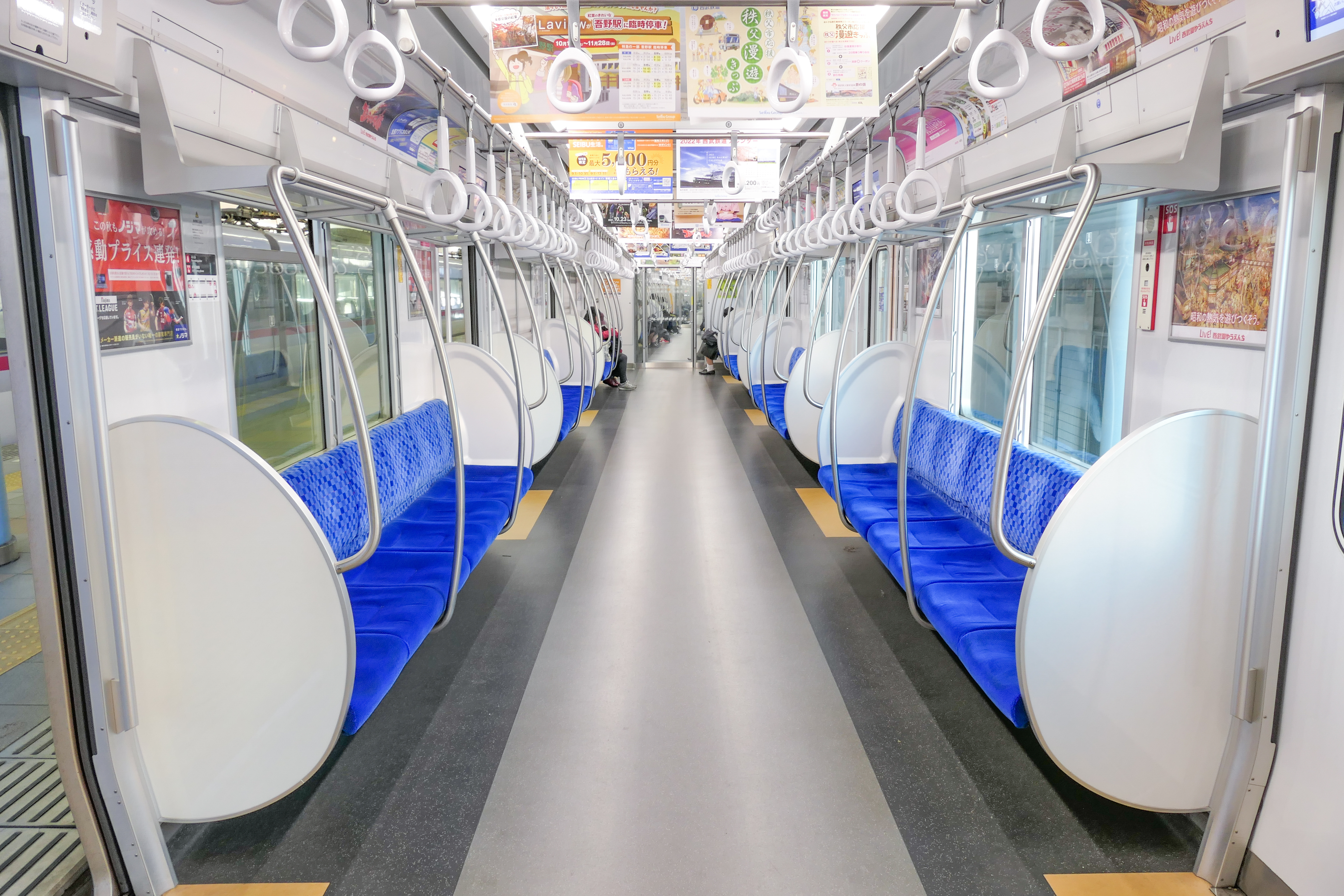
Interior

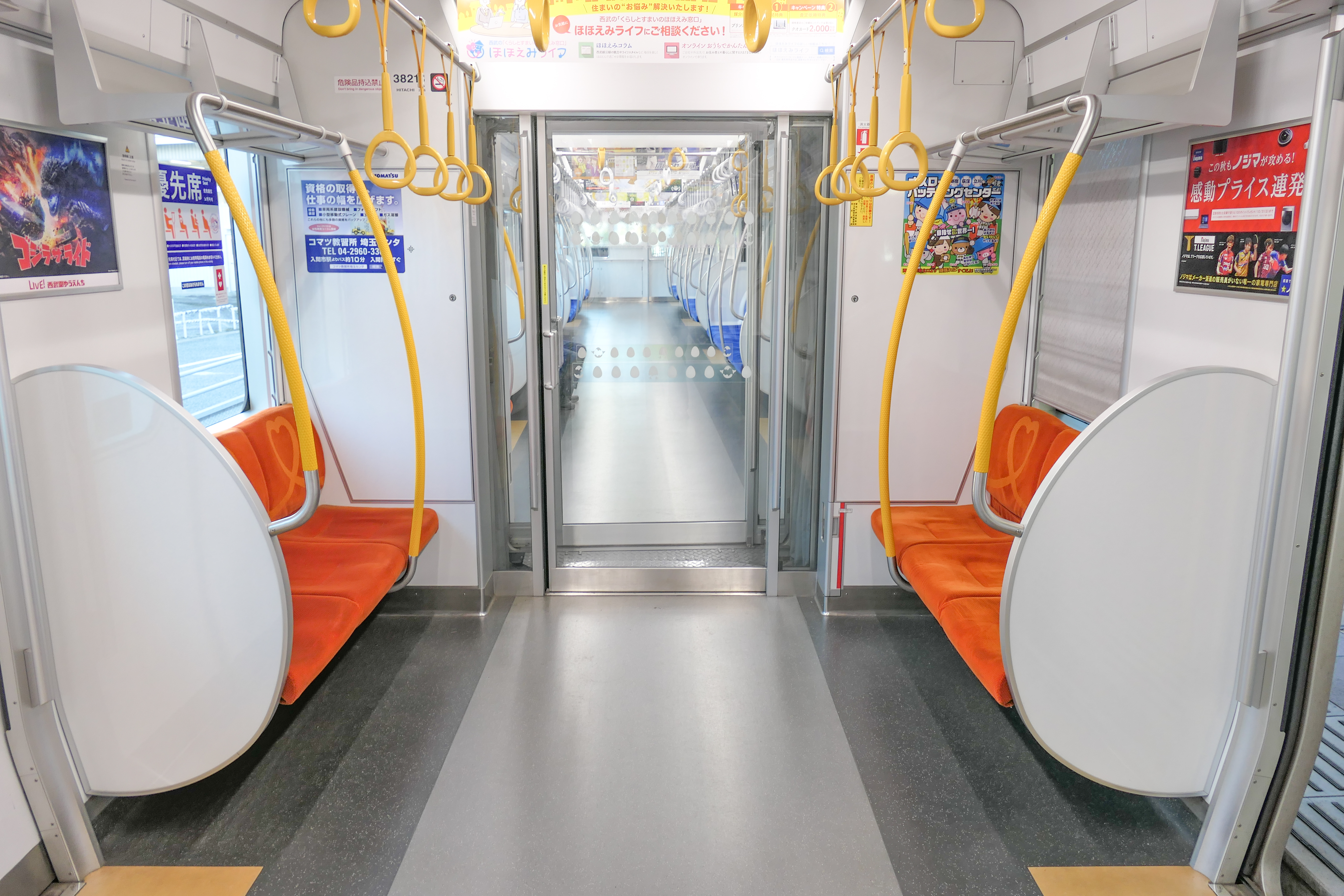
Priority seating

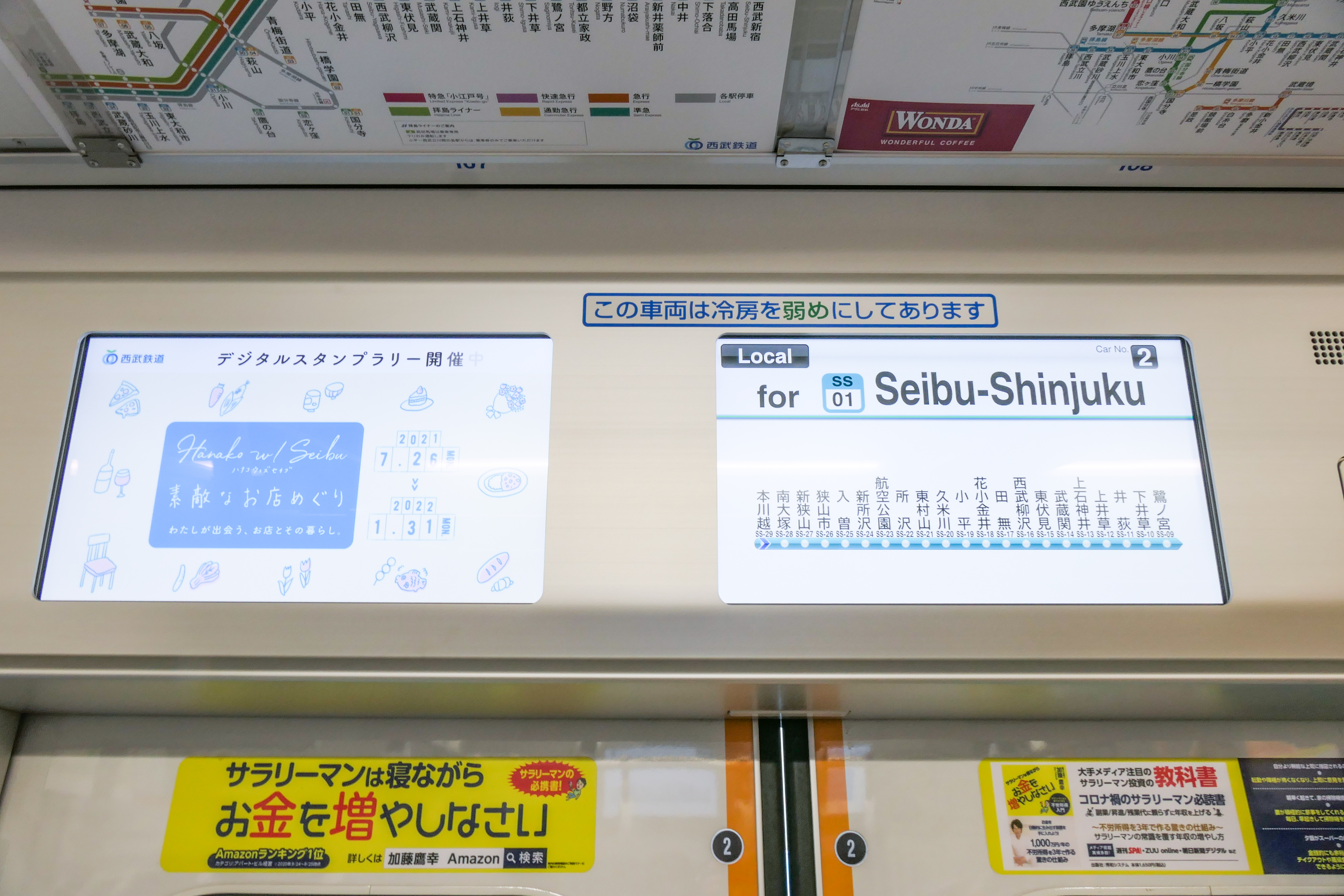
LCD information display

== History ==
The first train entered service on the Seibu Shinjuku Line on 26 April 2008.

== Livery variations ==
=== Doraemon ===
From 8 October 2020, eight-car set 38101 was operated with an all-over Doraemon-themed wrap. The sides are blue; some doors resemble Doraemon, and others are plain, in line with the rest of the body. The interior is also Doraemon-themed. The Doraemon-themed train is scheduled to operate until 20 September 2024.

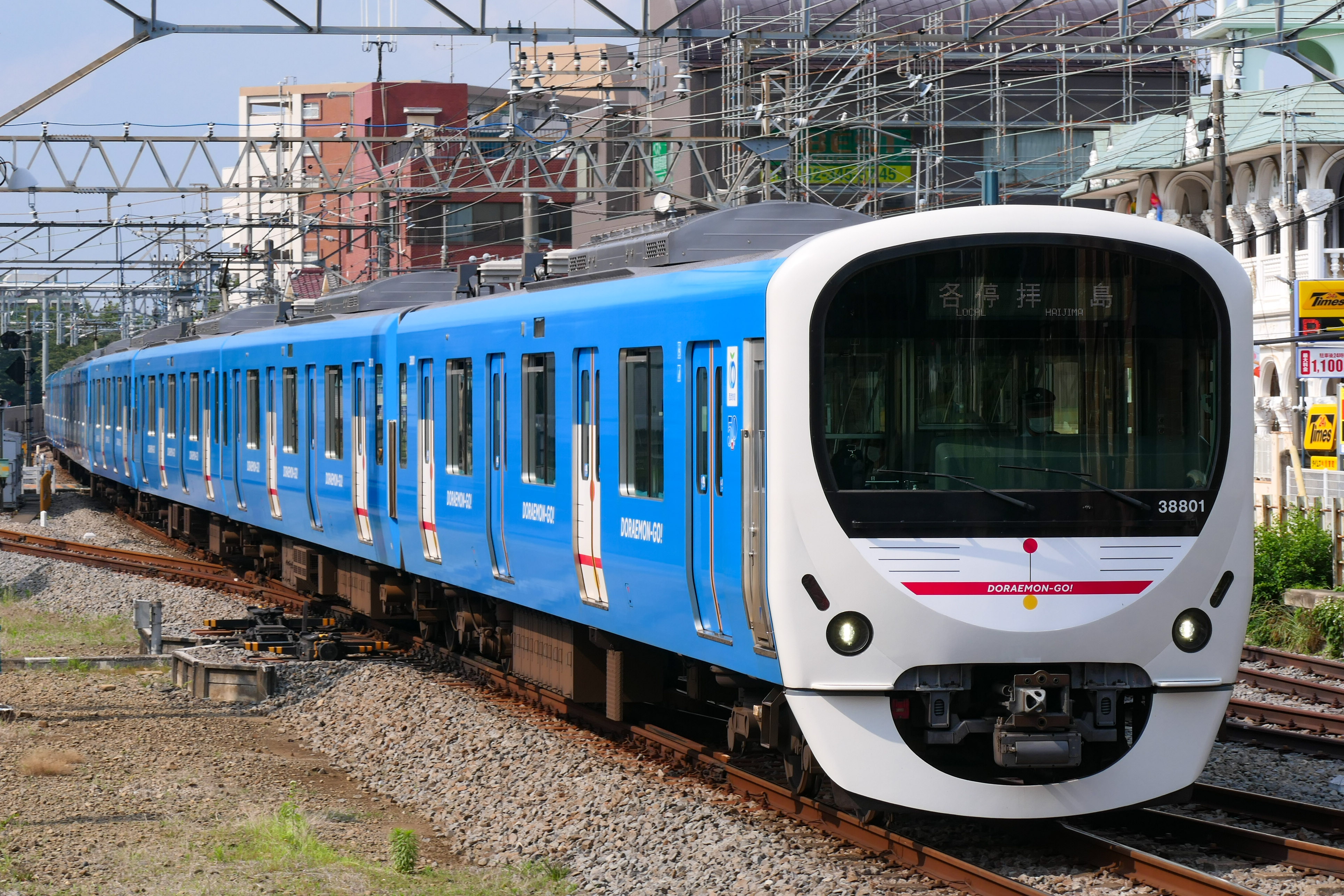
Set 38101

==== Interior ====
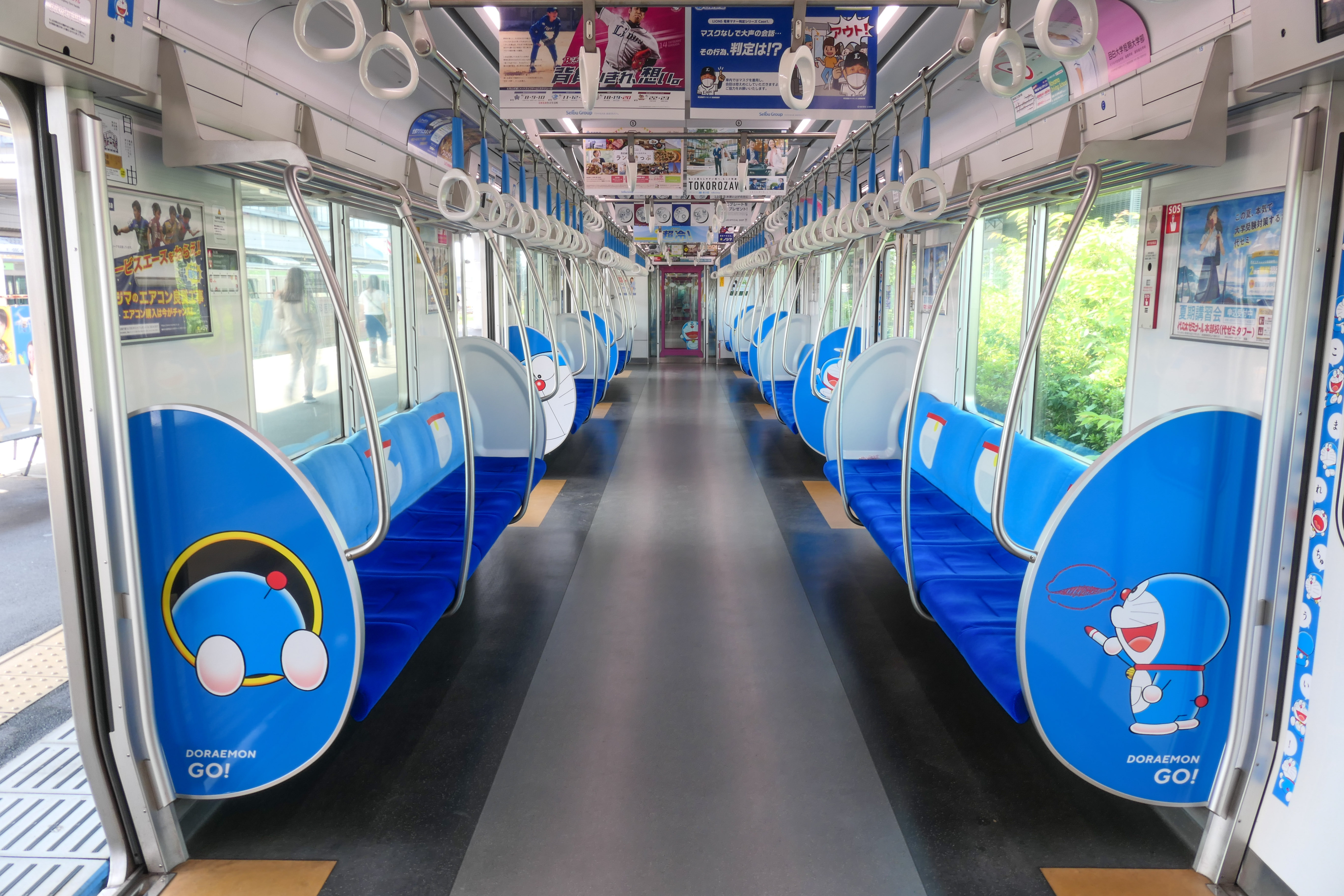
Interior view, May 2021

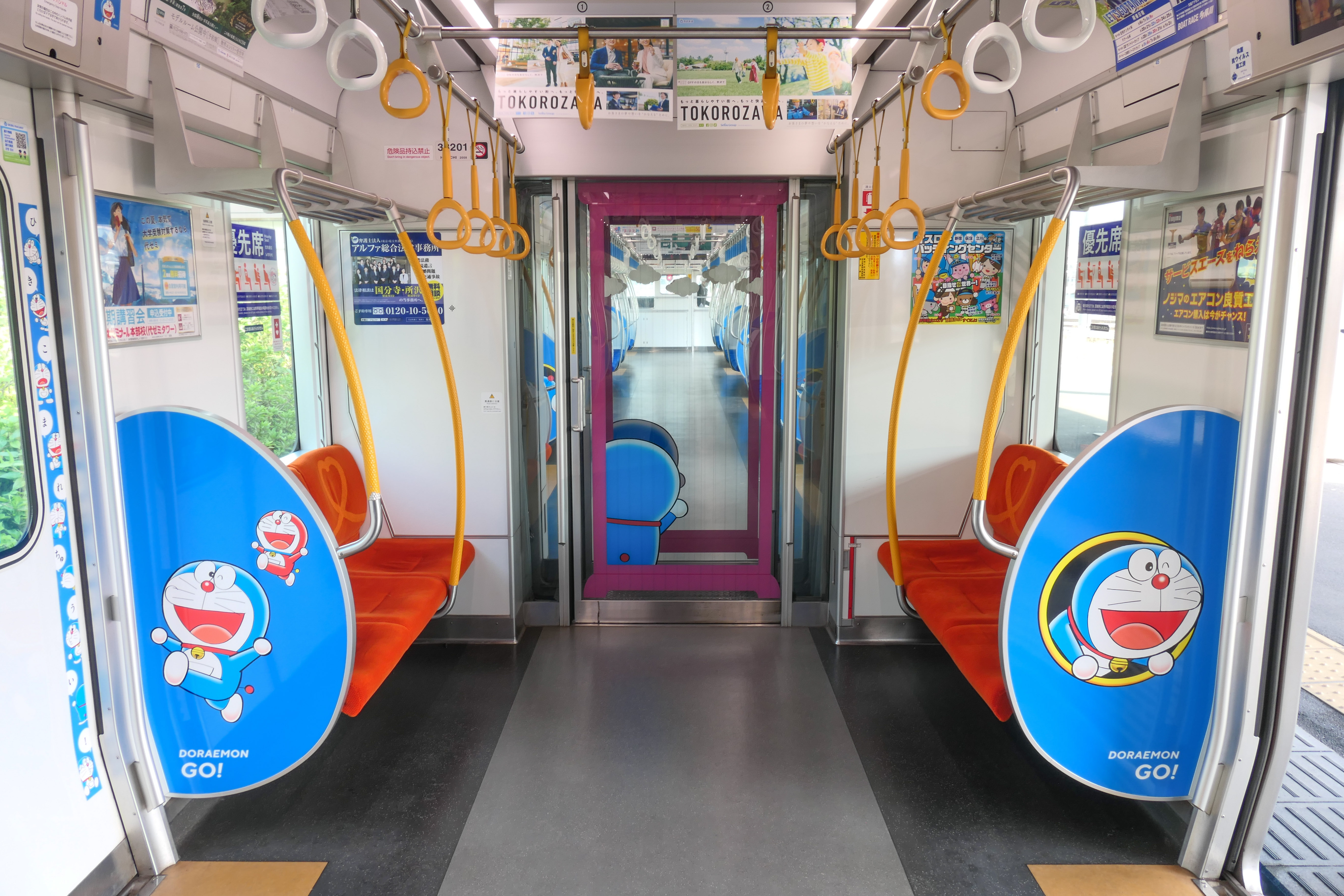
Priority seating, May 2021

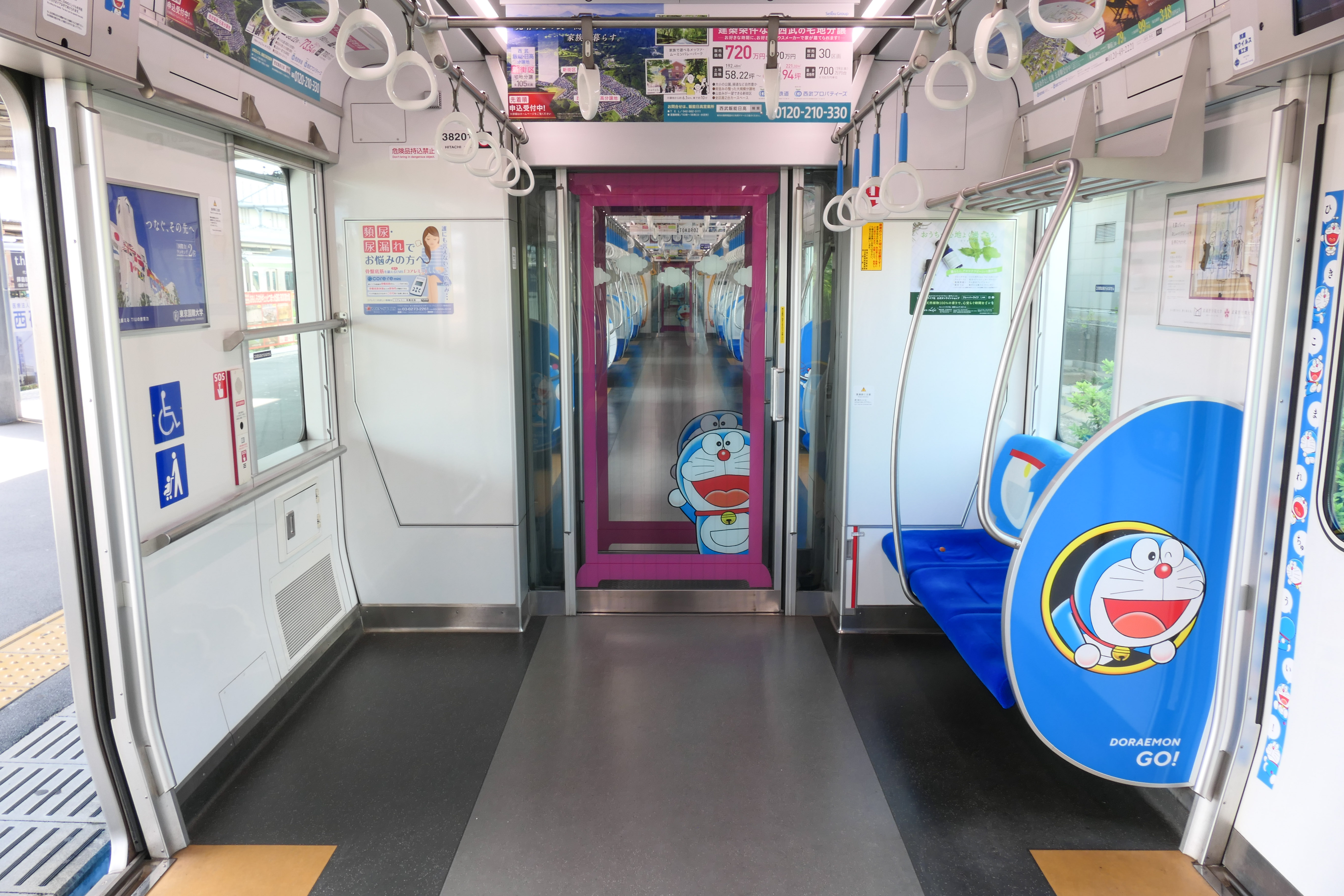
Wheelchair and stroller space, May 2021

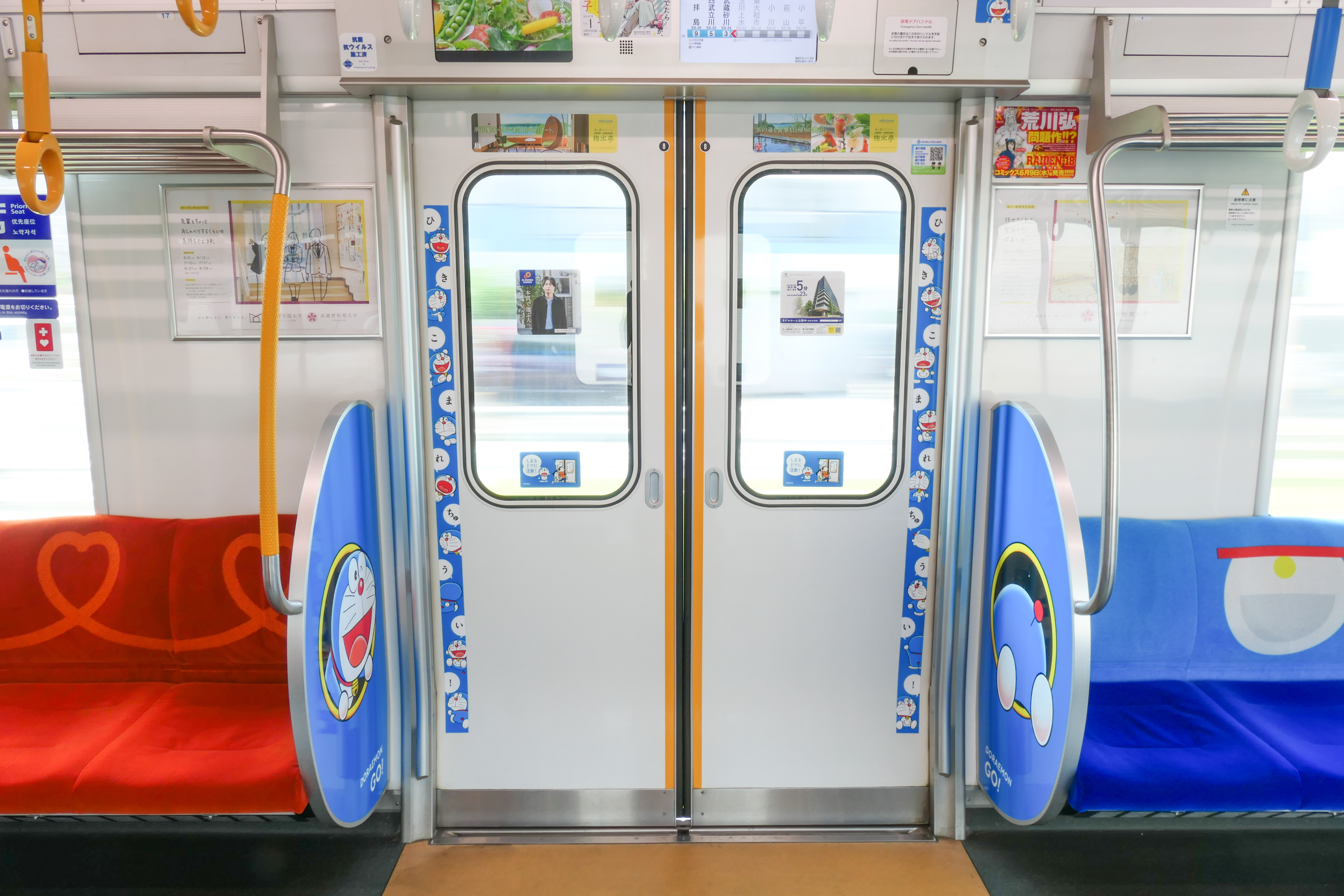
Door view, May 2021

== Fleet history ==
The fleet history details are as shown below.

=== 2-car sets ===
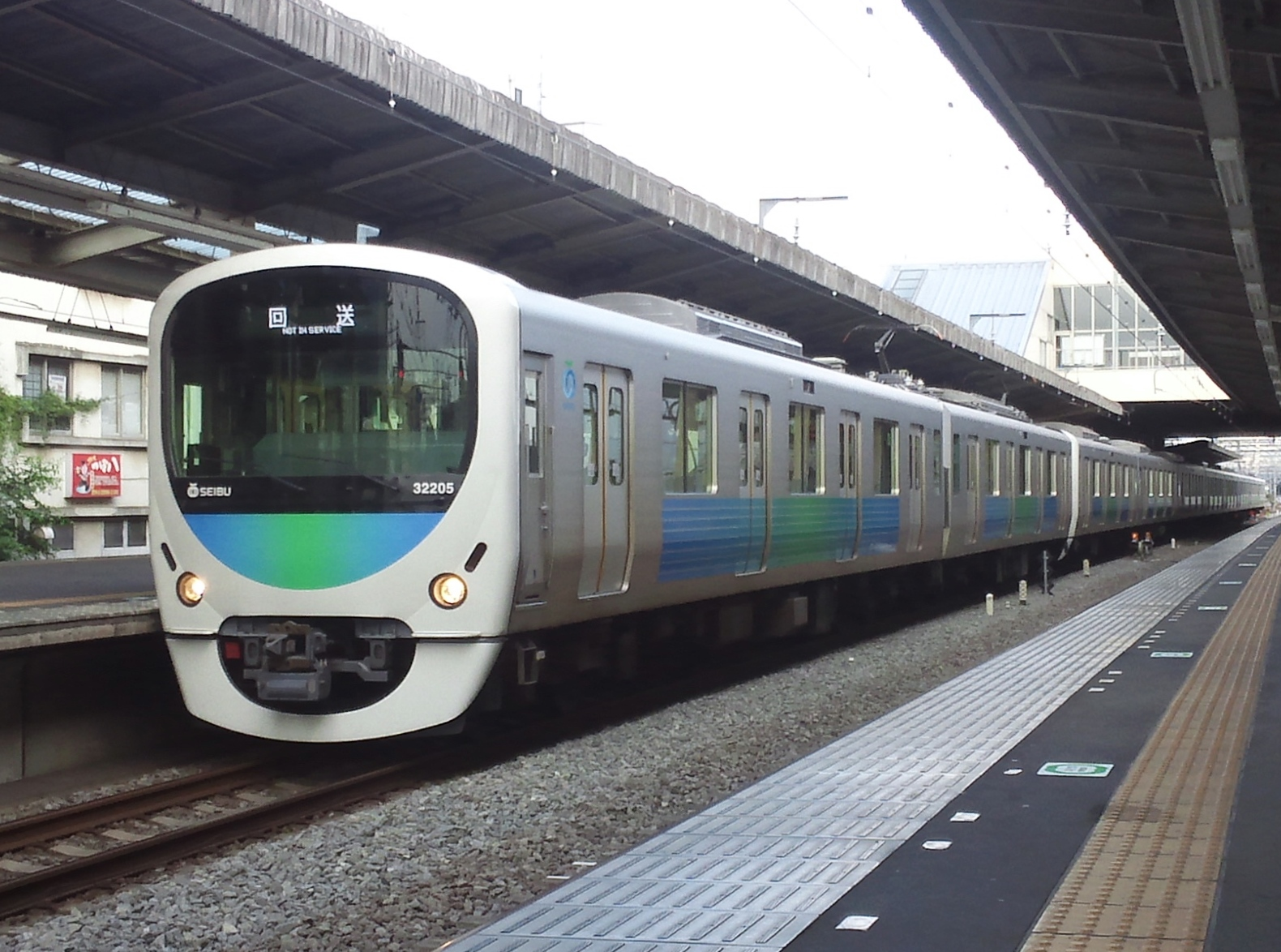
2-car set 32105 together with an 8-car set in September 2013

| Batch | Set No. | Date delivered |
|---|---|---|
| 2 | 32101 | |
| 2 | 32102 | |
| 2 | 32103 | |
| 6 | 32104 | 2 November 2012 |
| 6 | 32105 | 19 November 2012 |
| 6 | 32106 | 10 December 2012 |

=== 8-car sets ===
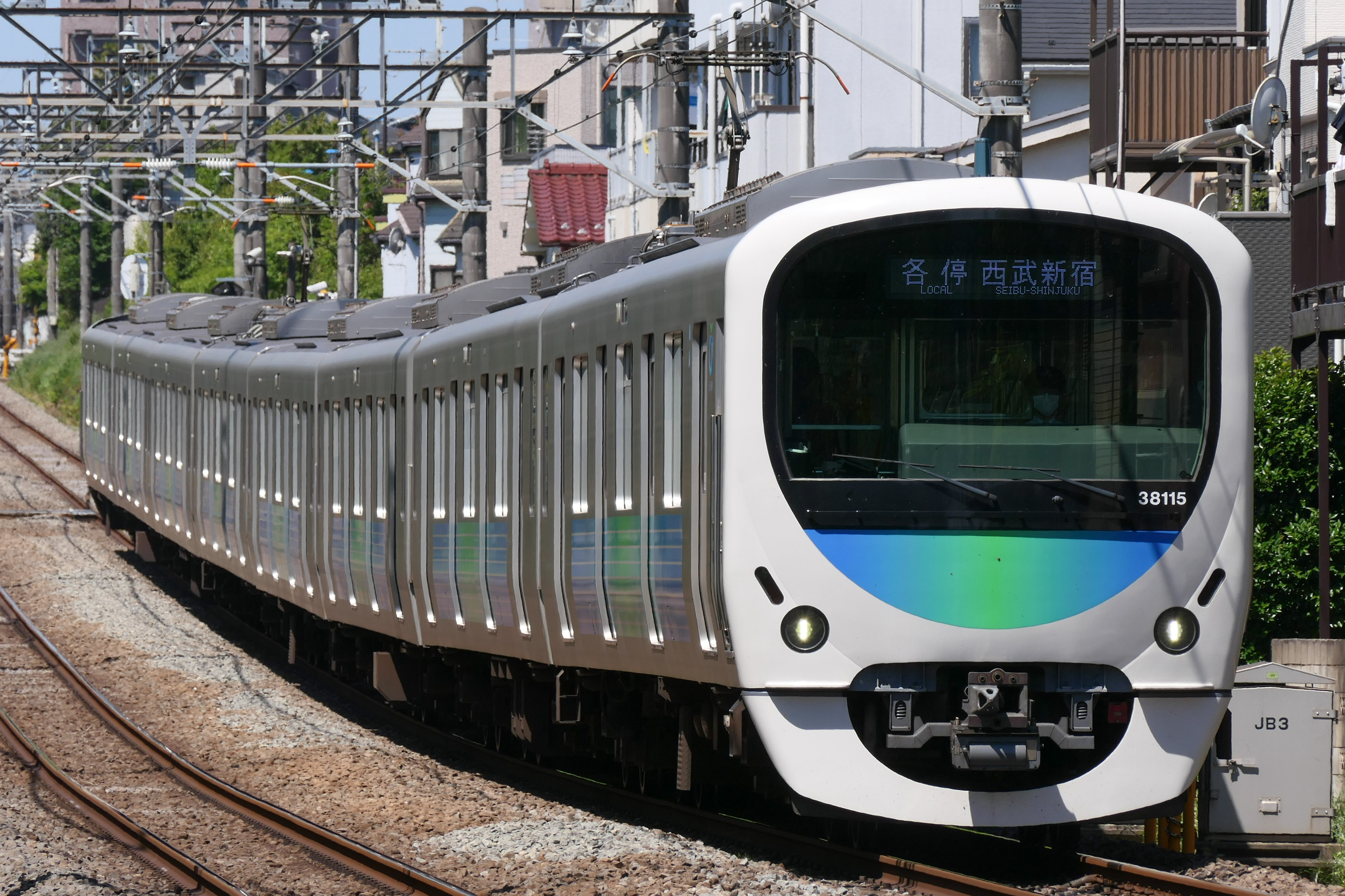
Set 38815 in April 2021

| Batch | Set No. | Date delivered |
|---|---|---|
| 1 | 38101 | |
| 1 | 38102 | |
| 1 | 38103 | |
| 2 | 38104 | |
| 2 | 38105 | |
| 3 | 38106 | |
| 3 | 38107 | |
| 4 | 38108 | |
| 4 | 38109 | |
| 5 | 38110 | |
| 5 | 38111 | |
| 6 | 38112 | 2 November 2012 |
| 6 | 38113 | 19 November 2012 |
| 6 | 38114 | 10 December 2012 |
| 7 | 38115 | 23 December 2013 |
| 8 | 38116 | 1 December 2014 |
| 9 | 38117 | 19 January 2016 |
| 10 | 38118 | June 2016 |

=== 10-car sets ===
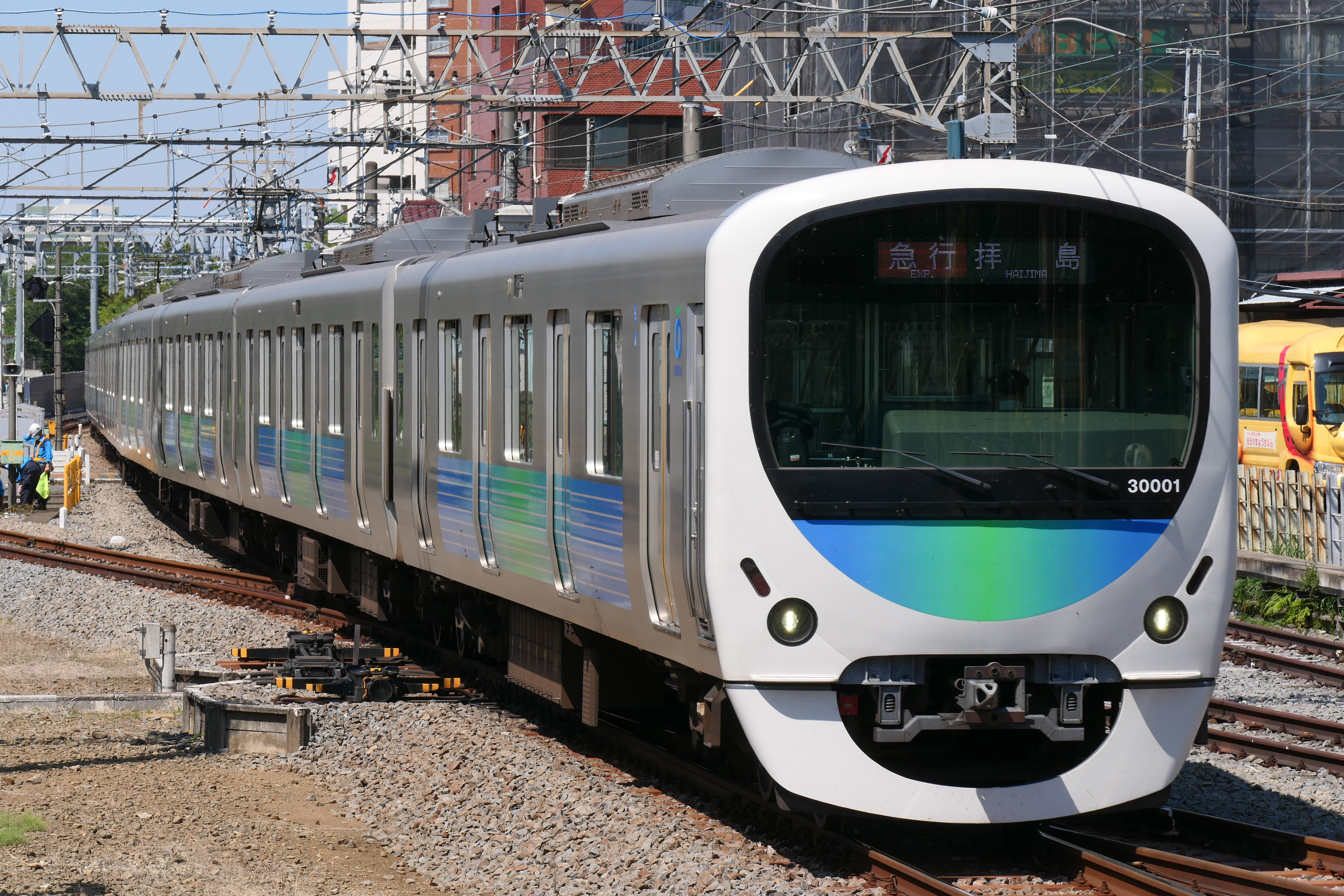
10-car set 30101 in April 2021

| Batch | Set No. | Date delivered |
|---|---|---|
| 7 | 30101 | 23 December 2013 |
| 7 | 30102 | 24 December 2013 |
| 8 | 30103 | 27 October 2014 |
| 8 | 30104 | 17 November 2014 |
| 9 | 30105 | 14 October 2015 |
| 9 | 30106 | 26 October 2015 |
