= Chichibu Railway 3000 series =

Japanese 3-car electric multiple units train type

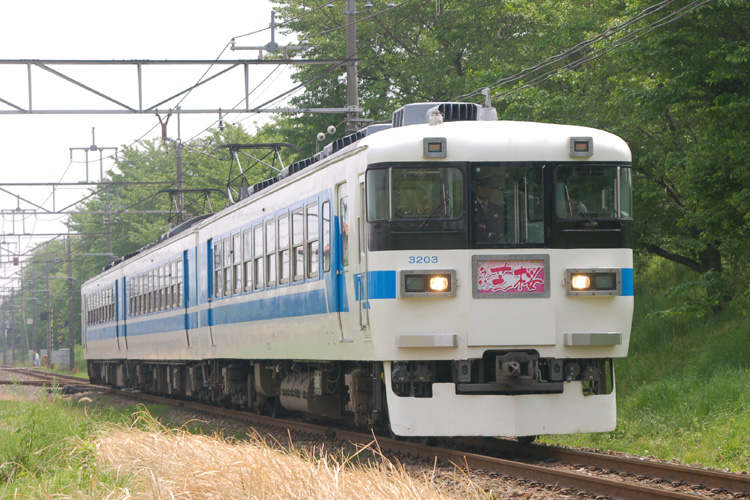
- 3000 series, May 2006
- In service: 1992–2006
- Replaced: 300 series
- Entered service: April 1992
- Scrapped: 2006
- Number built: 9 vehicles (3 sets)
- Number scrapped: 9 vehicles (3 sets)
- Formation: 3 cars per trainset
- Operator: Chichibu Railway

Specifications
- Car body construction: Steel
- Car length: 20 m
- Doors: 2 per side
- Electric system: 1,500 V DC
- Current collection: overhead
- Track gauge: 1,067 mm (3 ft 6 in)

The Chichibu Railway 3000 series (秩父鉄道3000系) was an electric multiple unit (EMU) train type for Chichibuji express services operated by Chichibu Railway in Japan from 1992 to 2006.

== History ==
Three 3-car trains were converted in 1992 from former JR East 165 series EMUs built in 1965, with the first set entering service in April 1992, and the second set entering service in June of the same year. The conversion involved sealing the end gangways, adding new headlight clusters, and removing the toilets. The trains were later replaced by 6000 series EMUs, and the last train in service was withdrawn in November 2006 and cut up by January 2007.

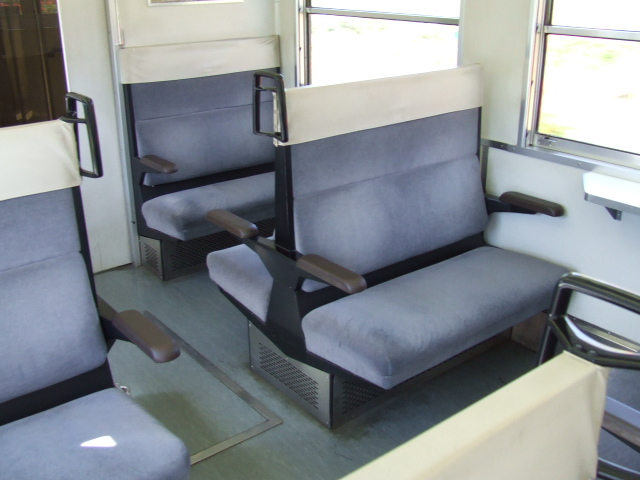
Interior view showing fixed transverse seating bays

== Formations ==
The three 3-car sets were formed as shown below.

DeHa	DeHa	DeHa	Conversion date	Withdrawal date
3001 (ex KuMoHa 165-91)	3101 (ex MoHa 164-55)	3201 (ex KuHa 165-93)	31 March 1992	28 November 2006
3002 (ex KuMoHa 165-82)	3102 (ex MoHa 164-50)	3202 (ex KuHa 165-86)	25 June 1992	15 March 2006
3003 (ex KuMoHa 165-93)	3103 (ex MoHa 164-57)	3203 (ex KuHa 165-95)	16 October 1992	30 July 2006
