= Chichibu Railway 300 series =

Class of two Japanese 3-car electric multiple units

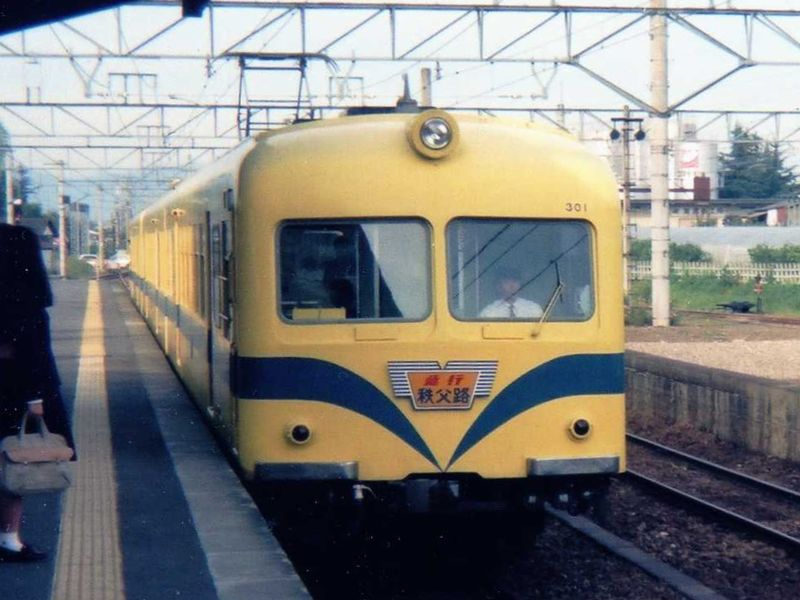
- 300 series at Takekawa Station, 1989
- In service: 1959–1992
- Constructed: 1959–1966
- Scrapped: 1997
- Number built: 6 vehicles (2 sets)
- Number scrapped: 6 vehicles
- Formation: 3 cars per trainset
- Operator: Chichibu Railway
- Line served: Chichibu Main Line

Specifications
- Car body construction: Steel/aluminium
- Car length: 20 m (65 ft 7 in)
- Doors: 2 per side
- Electric system: 1,500 V DC
- Current collection: Overhead wire
- Track gauge: 1,067 mm (3 ft 6 in)

The Chichibu Railway 300 series (秩父鉄道300系) was an electric multiple unit (EMU) train type for Chichibu-ji express services on the Chichibu Main Line operated by the private railway operator Chichibu Railway in Japan.

== History ==
Two 2-car trains were built in 1959 with transverse seating for use on express services. New SaHa 350 intermediate cars with aluminium bodies were added in 1966. The trains were replaced by 3000 series express EMUs and withdrawn by October 1992.

== Formation ==
The trains were formed of two driving motor cars and an intermediate trailer car as follows.

- DeHa 300 + SaHa 350 + DeHa 300
