= Seibu 101 series =

Electric multiple unit train of Seibu Railway

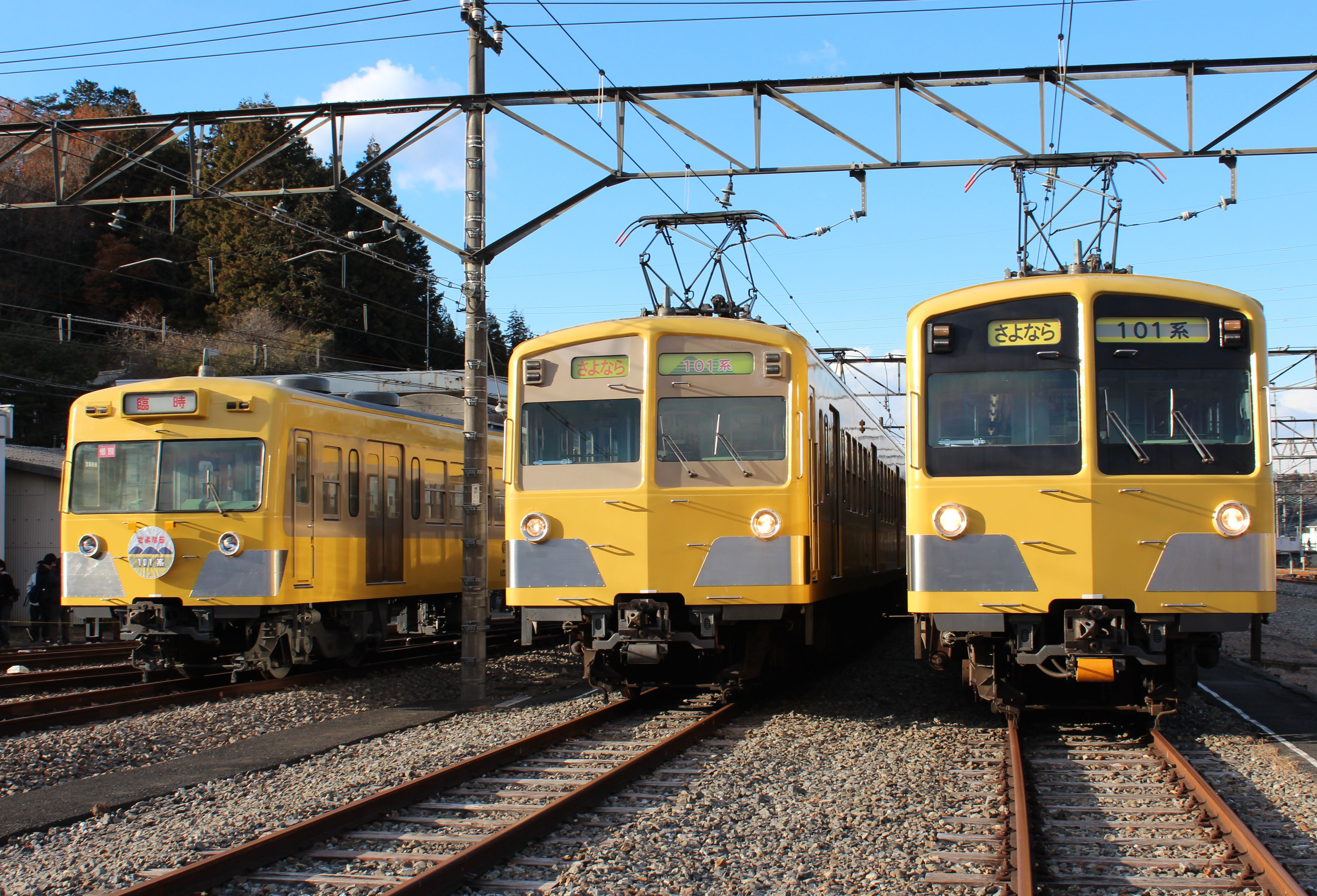
Lineup of 101 series trains at Yokoze yard on December 9, 2012

The Seibu 101 series (西武101系) and New 101 series (新101系) are electric multiple unit (EMU) train types operated by the private railway operator Seibu Railway in Japan.

== Original 101 series ==
Seibu 101 series
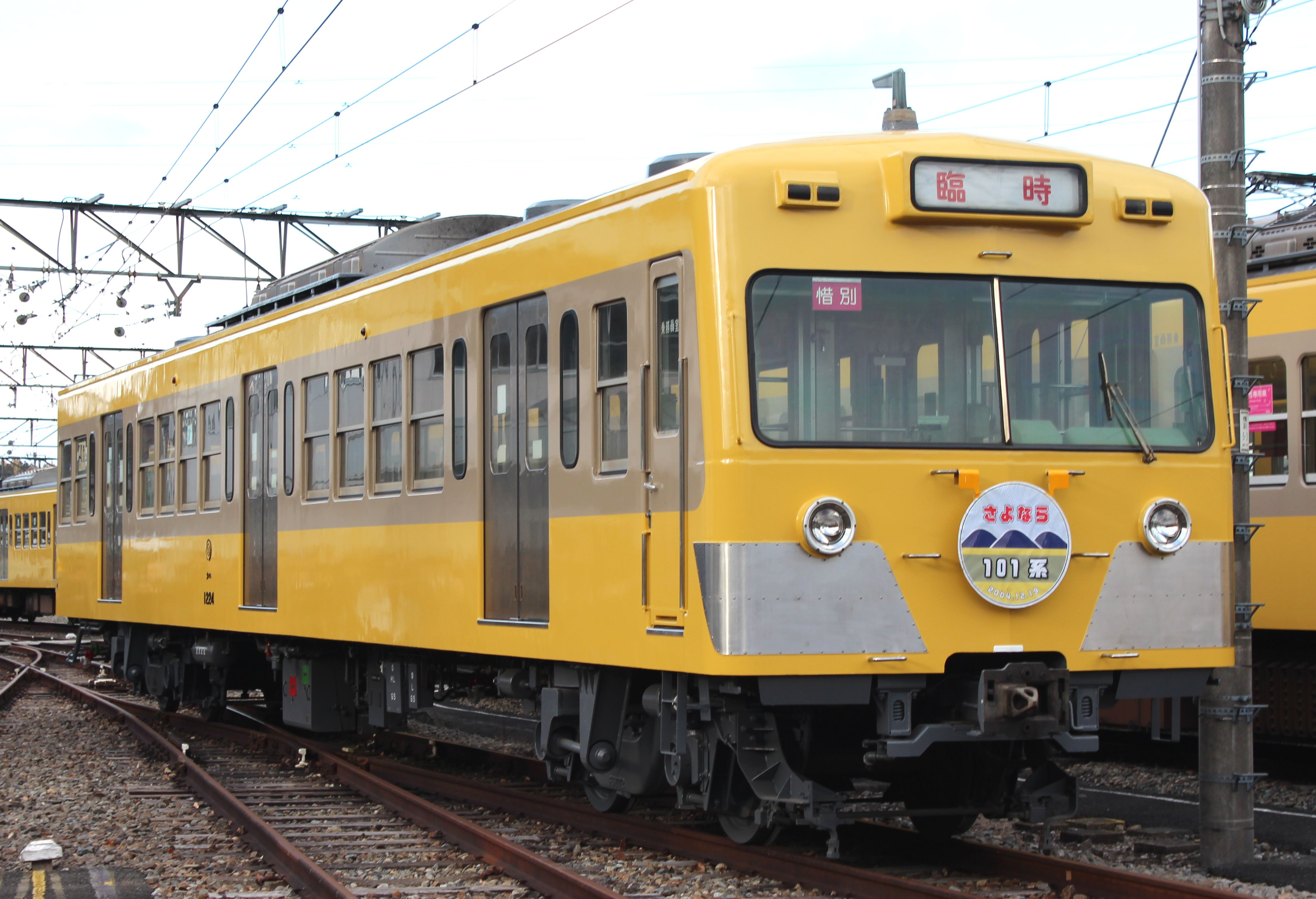
- A Seibu 101 series train in December 2012 at Yokoze rail yard
- Manufacturer: Seibu Tokorozawa railway works
- Constructed: 1968–1976
- Entered service: March 5, 1969
- Number built: 278 vehicles
- Number in service: None
- Formation: 2/4/6/8 cars per trainset
- Operators: Seibu Railway

Specifications
- Car length: 20,000 mm (65 ft 7 in)
- Doors: 3 pairs per side
- Maximum speed: 105 km/h (65 mph)
- Traction system: Resistor control
- Traction motors: HS-836-Nrb; HS-836-Prb
- Power output: 150 kW (201 hp)
- Acceleration: 2.3km/h/s
- Deceleration: 3.5km/h/s (Service) 4.5km/h/s (Emergency)
- Electric system(s): 1,500 V DC overhead catenary
- Current collector(s): Pantograph
- Safety system(s): ATS
- Track gauge: 1,067 mm (3 ft 6 in)

The 101 series began service in 1969, in conjunction with the opening of the Seibu Chichibu Line.

== New 101 series and 301 series ==
Seibu New 101 series
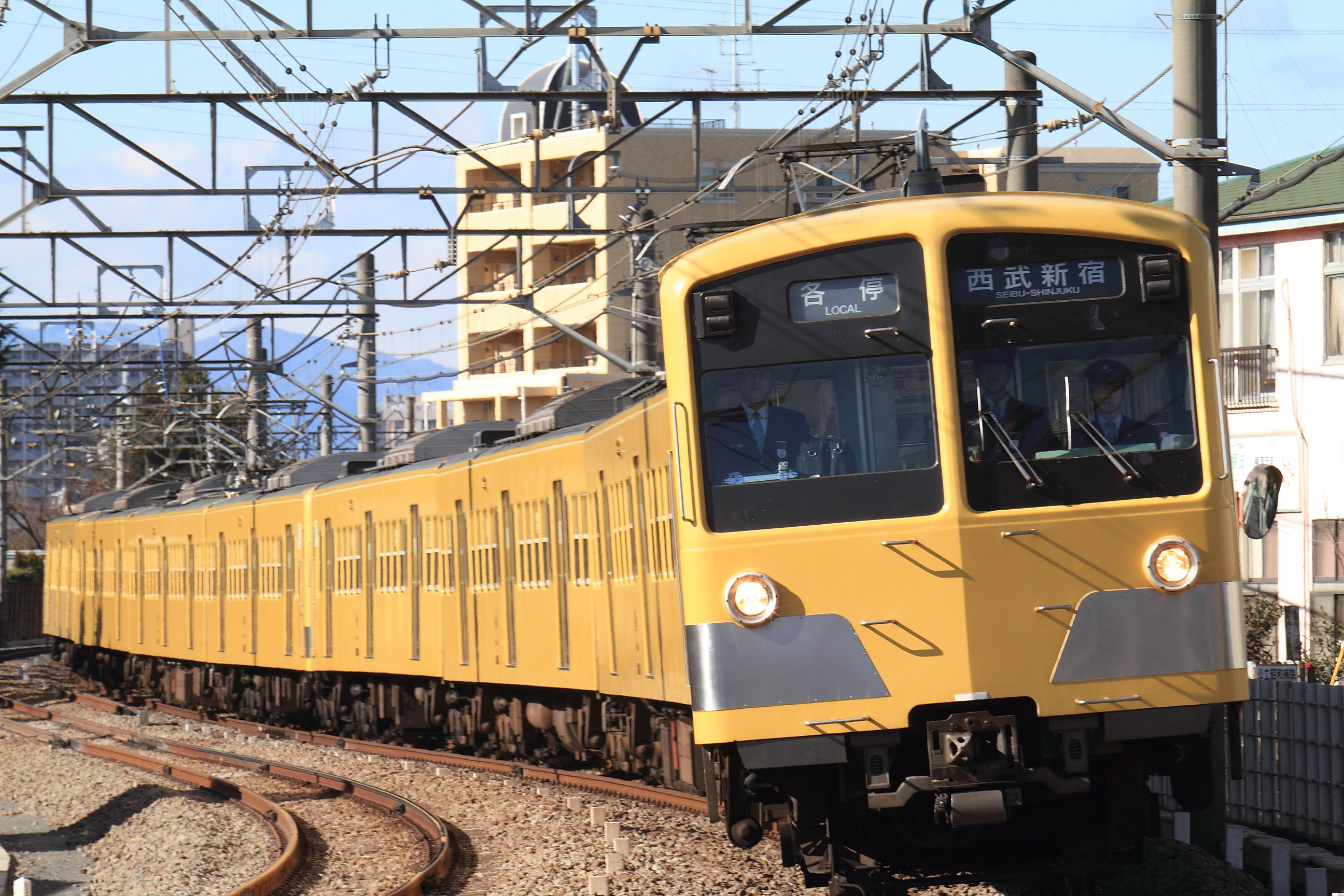
- A Seibu New 101 series train
- Manufacturer: Seibu Tokorozawa railway works, Tokyu car cooperation
- Constructed: 1979–1984
- Entered service: 1979
- Number built: 154 vehicles
- Formation: 2/4/8 cars per trainset
- Operators: Seibu Railway

Specifications
- Car length: 20,000 mm (65 ft 7 in)
- Width: 2,881 mm (9 ft 5.4 in)
- Height: 4,065 mm (13 ft 4.0 in)
- Floor height: 880 mm (2 ft 11 in)
- Doors: 3 pairs per side
- Maximum speed: 105 km/h (65 mph)
- Traction system: Resistor control
- Traction motors: HS-836-Nrb; HS-836-Prb
- Power output: 150 kW (201 hp)
- Acceleration: 2.3km/h/s
- Deceleration: 3.5km/h/s (Service) 4.5km/h/s (Emergency)
- Electric system(s): 1,500 V DC overhead catenary
- Current collector(s): Pantograph
- Safety system(s): ATS
- Track gauge: 1,067 mm (3 ft 6 in)

The New 101 series features changes in design. The 301 series is based on the New 101 series, and were formed as eight-car sets.

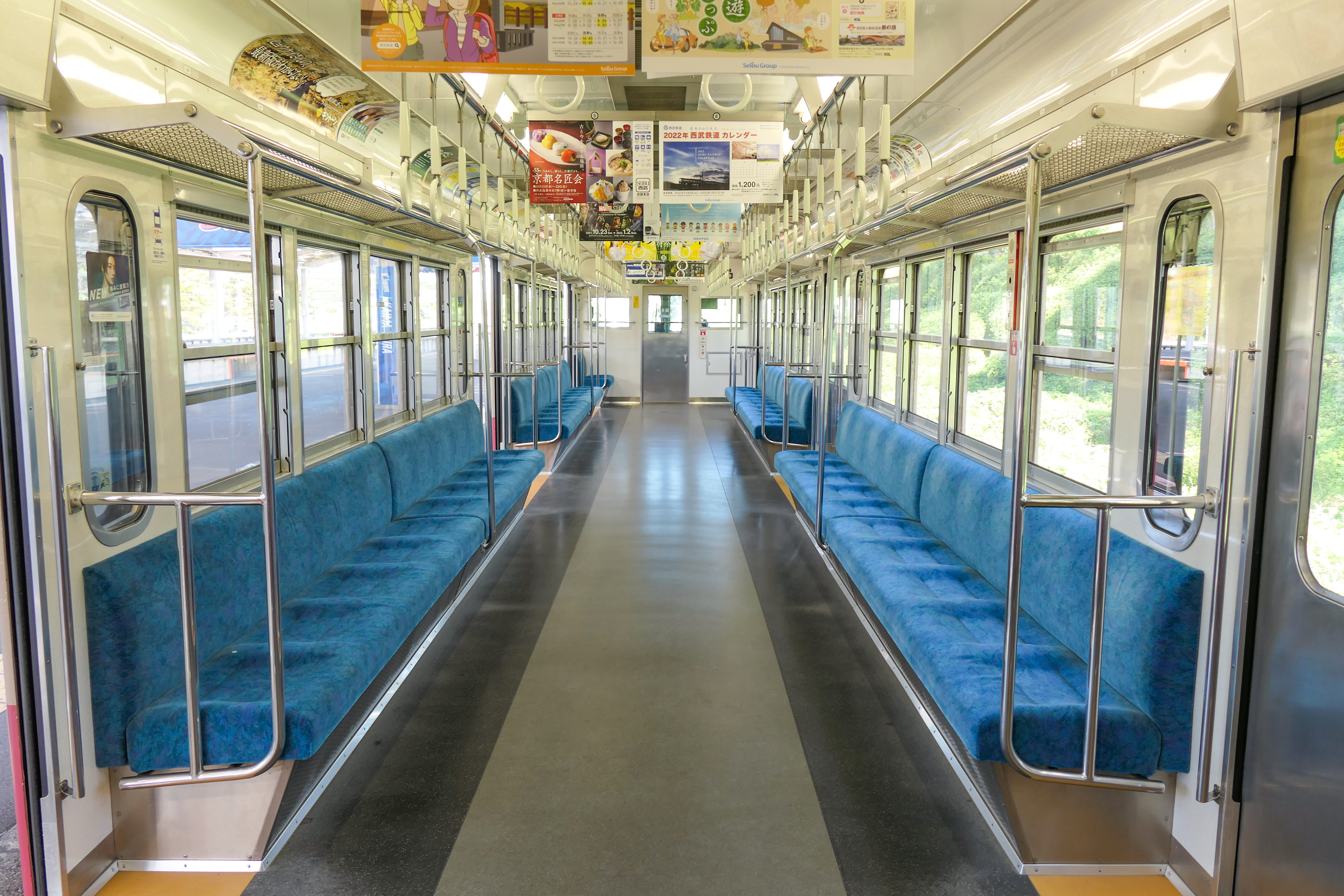
Interior view

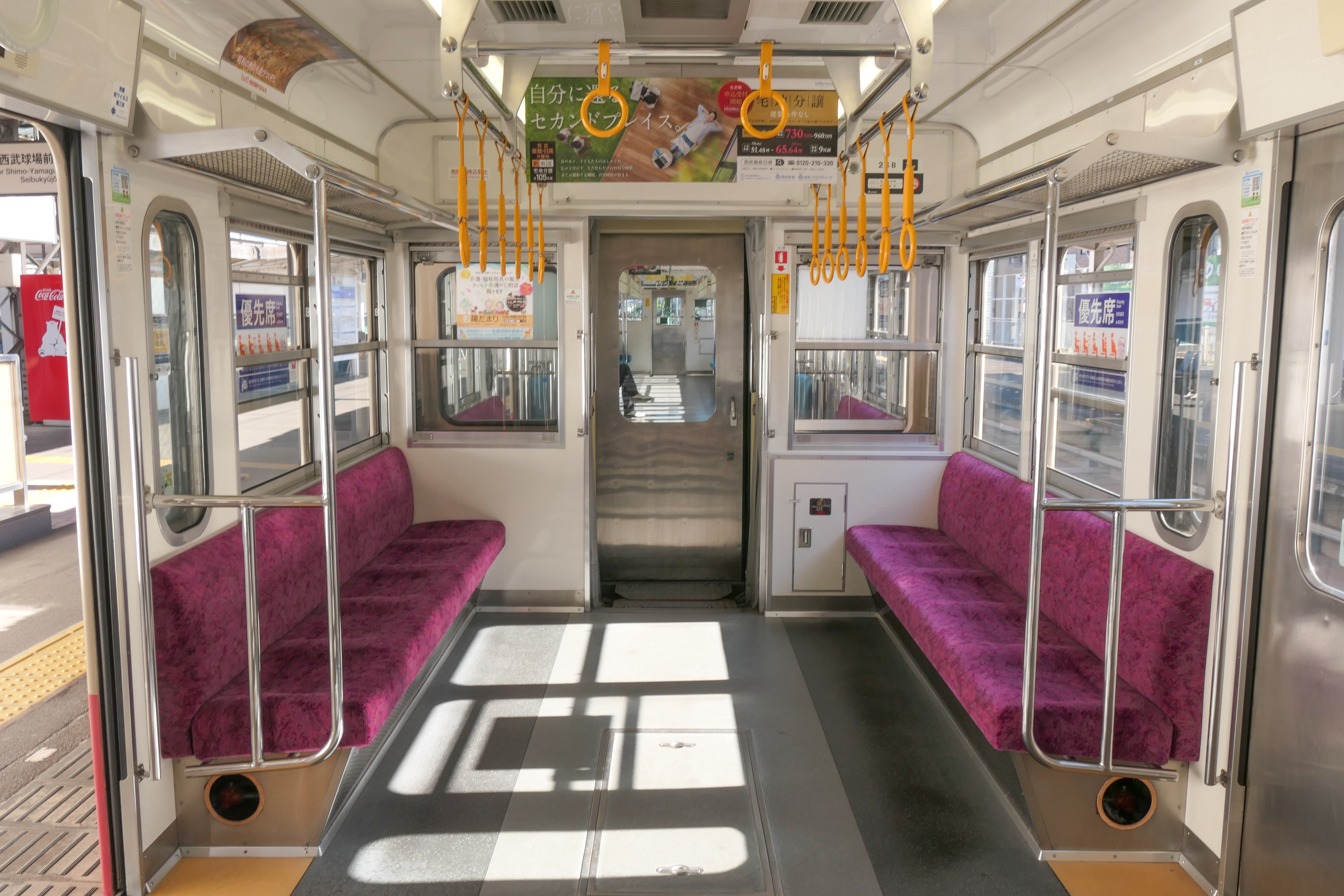
Priority seating

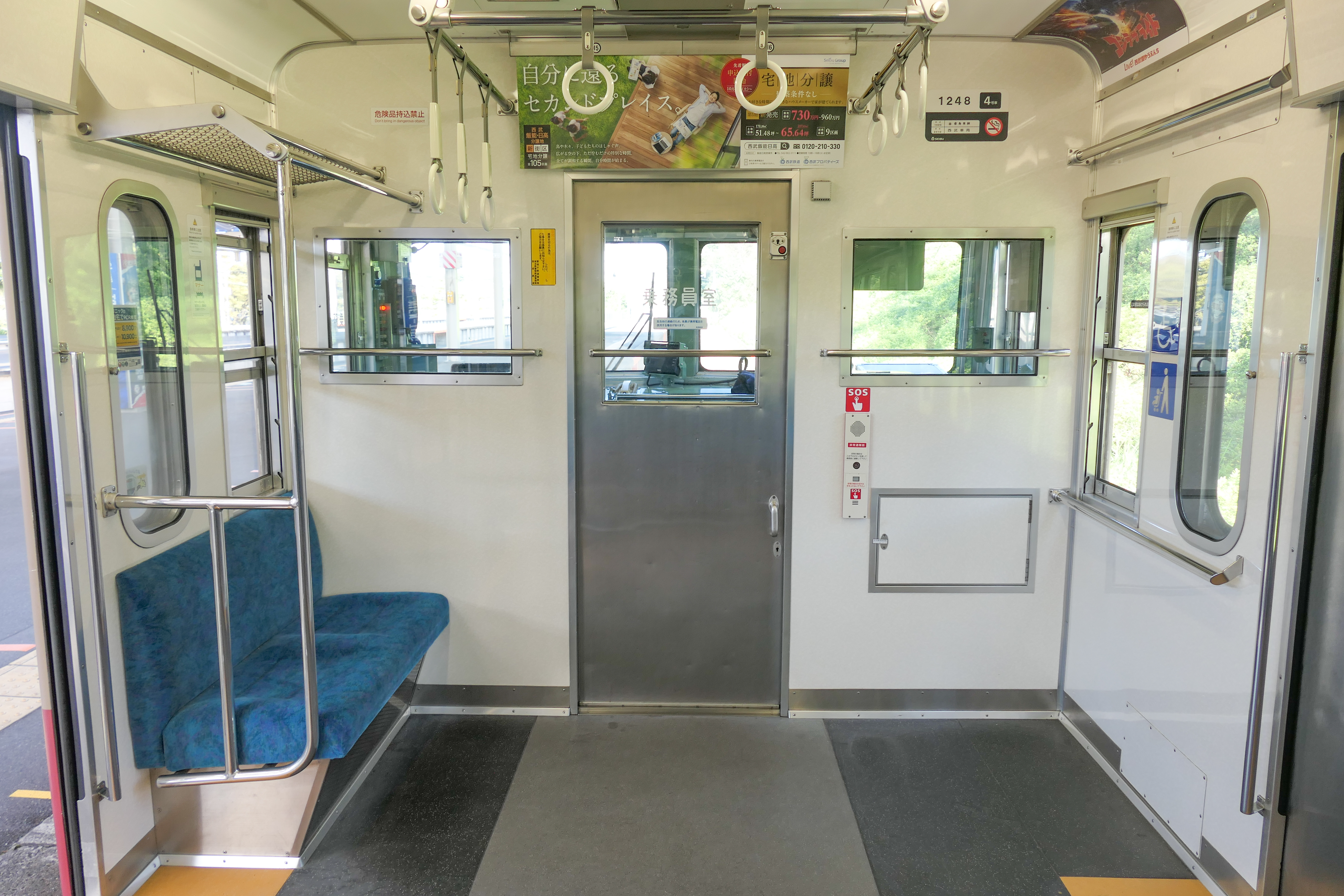
Wheelchair space

== Resale ==
The Chichibu Railway 6000 series trains were rebuilt from former Seibu New 101 series trains. Sangi Railway operates former New 101 series trains as Sangi Railway 751 series. Former Seibu New 101 series trains were also transferred to Ryutetsu, becoming Ryutetsu 5000 series trains.

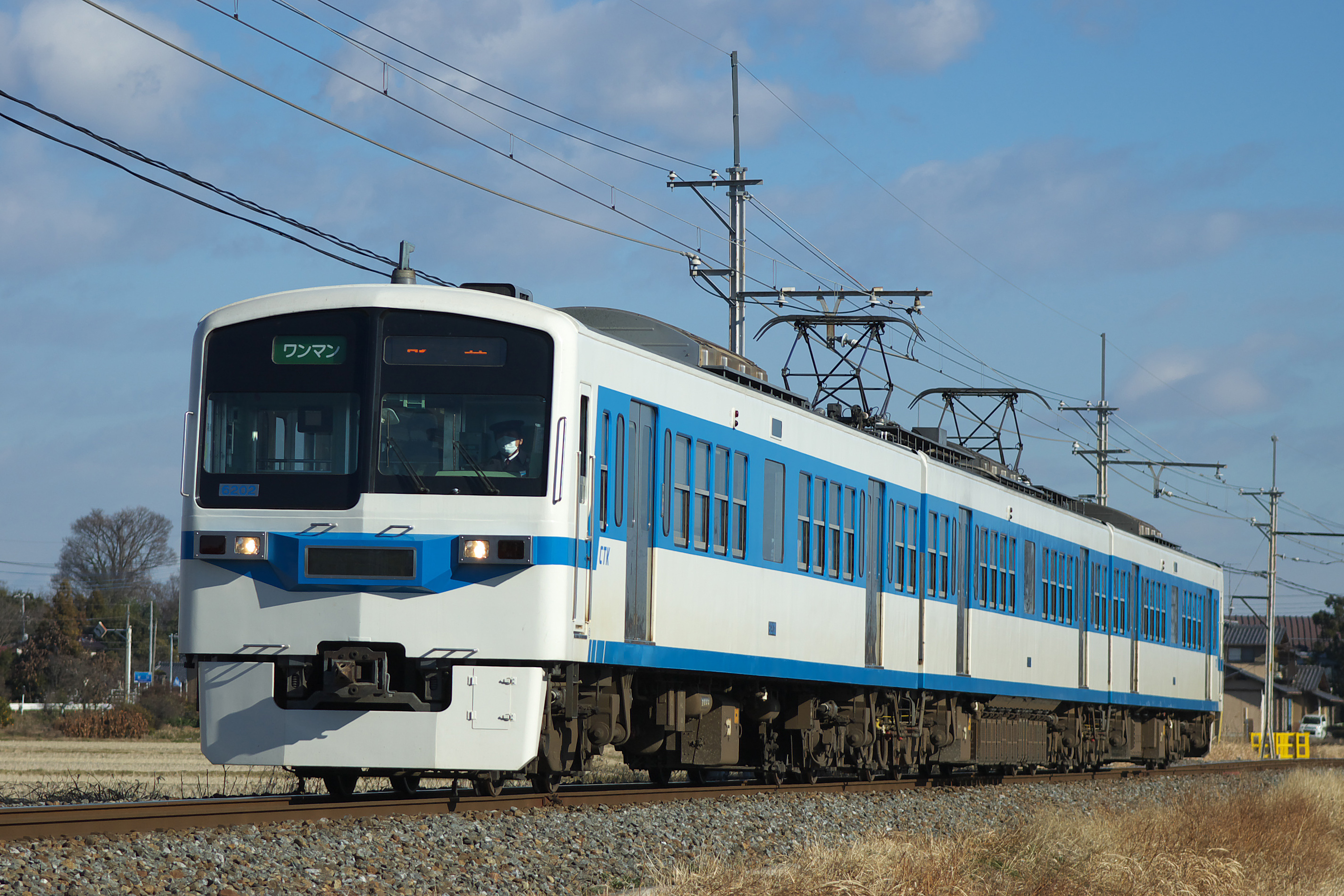
Chichibu Railway 6000 series

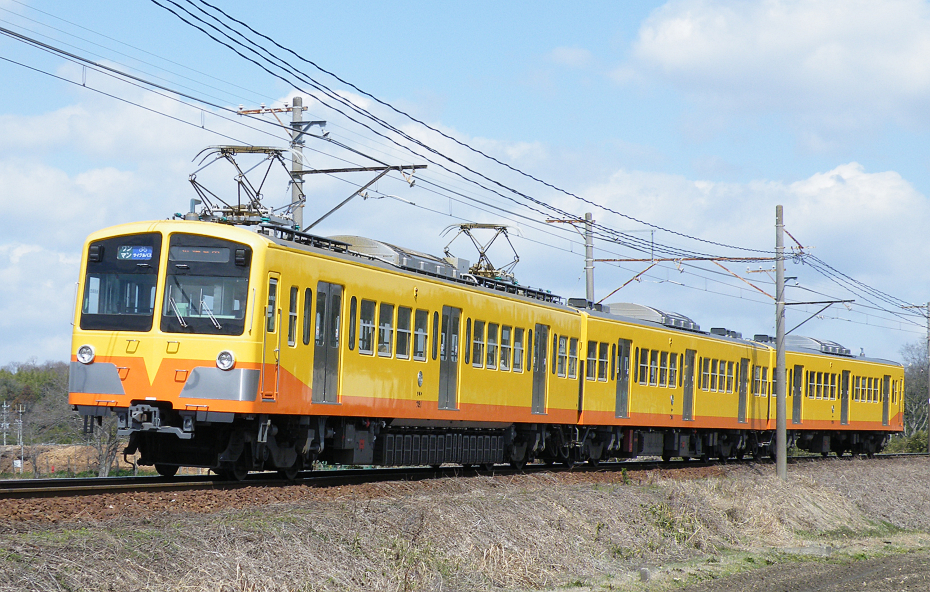
Sangi Railway 751 series

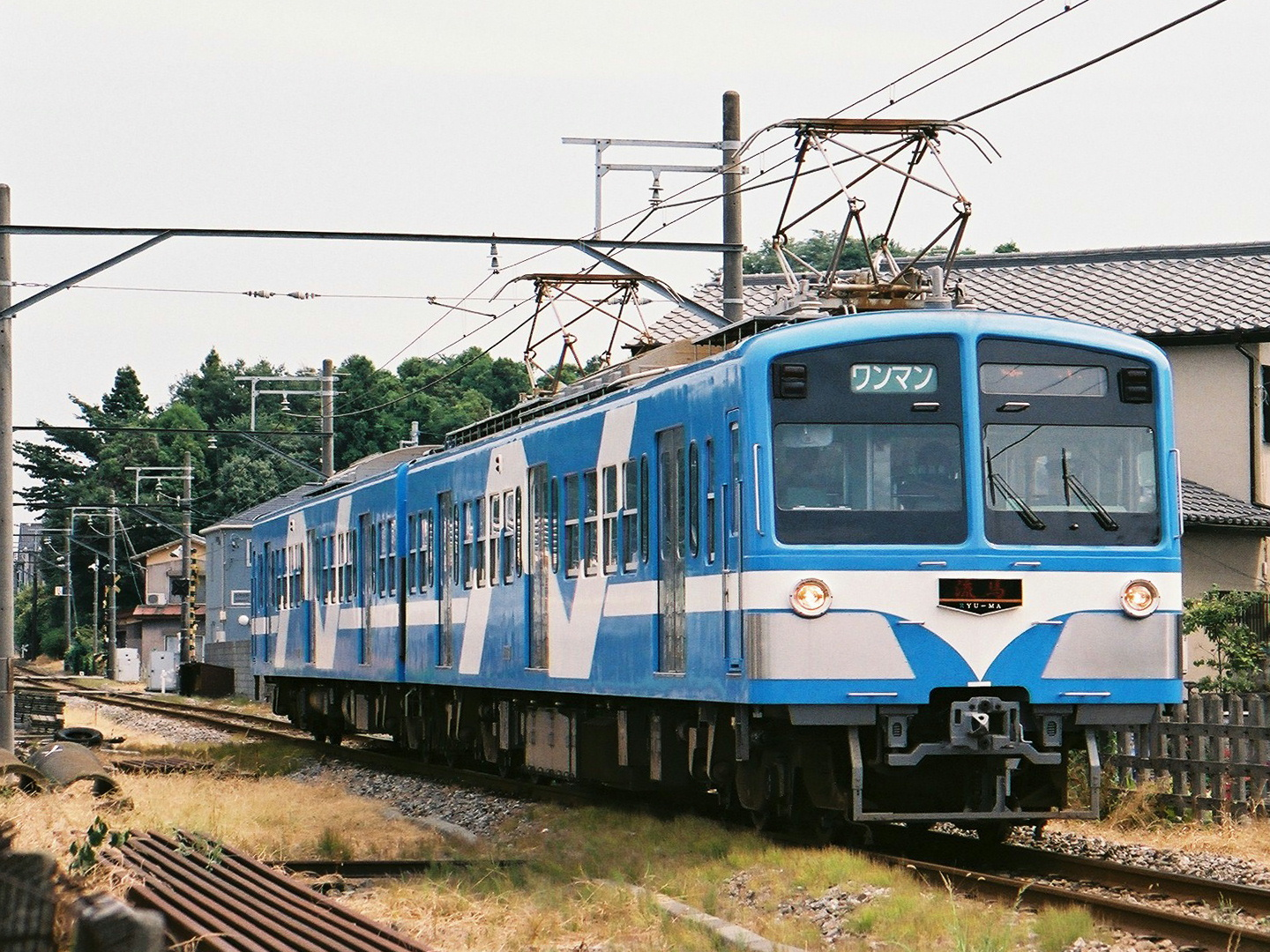
Ryutetsu 5000 series

== Livery variations ==
In 2018, one set received a livery resembling the Ohmi Railway 100 series. Other livery variations include a set in Izuhakone Railway livery, and a set in red and beige livery.

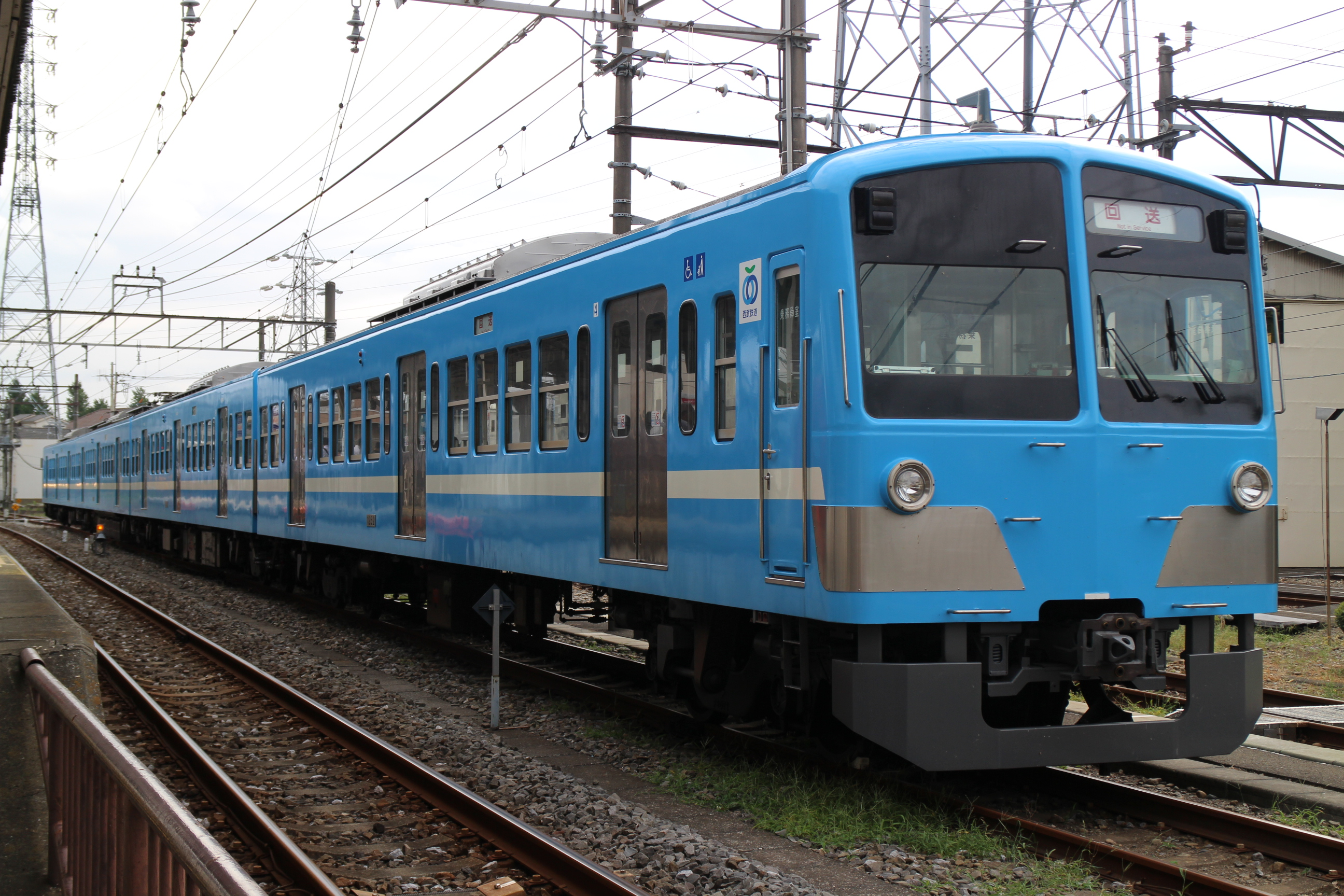
101 series in Ohmi Railway livery

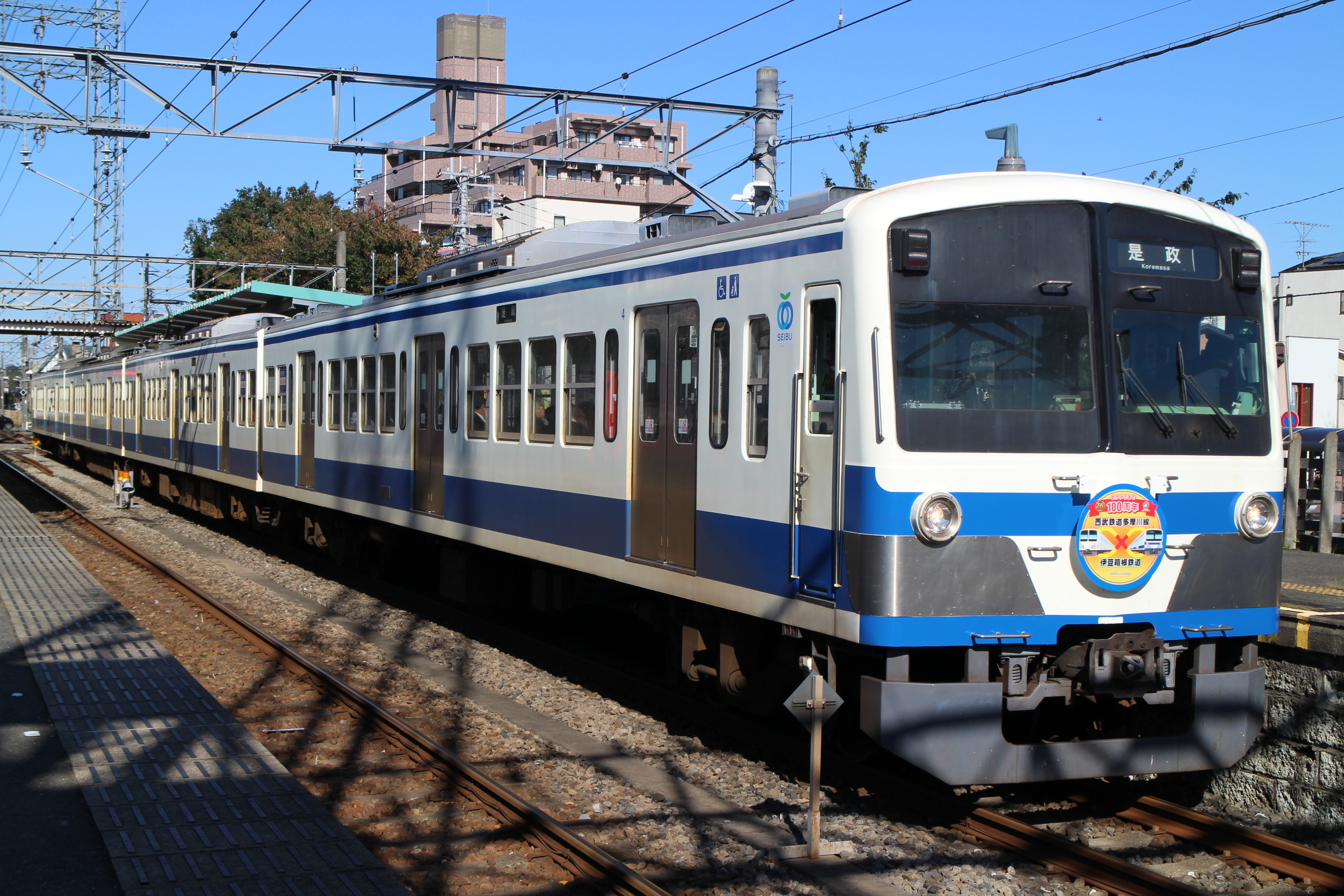
Set 1249 in Izuhakone Railway-style livery

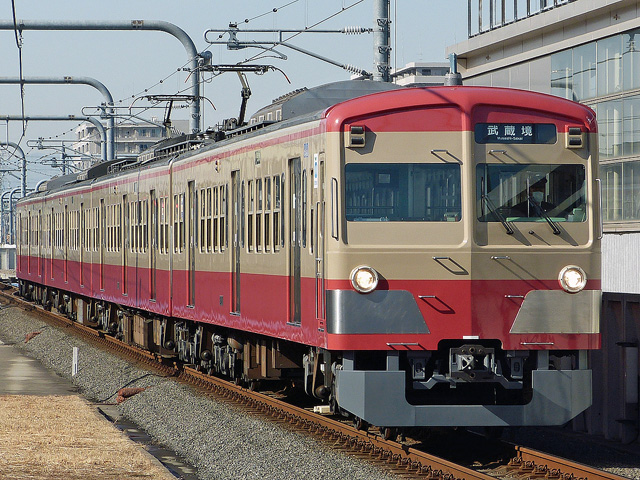
Red and beige livery

== Preserved examples ==
- KuHa 1150: used as a library room at the Kumegawa Train Library in Higashimurayama, Tokyo.
- KuHa 1224: preserved at Yokoze yard.
- KuHa 1262: exhibited outside the MetLife Dome in Tokorozawa, Saitama.
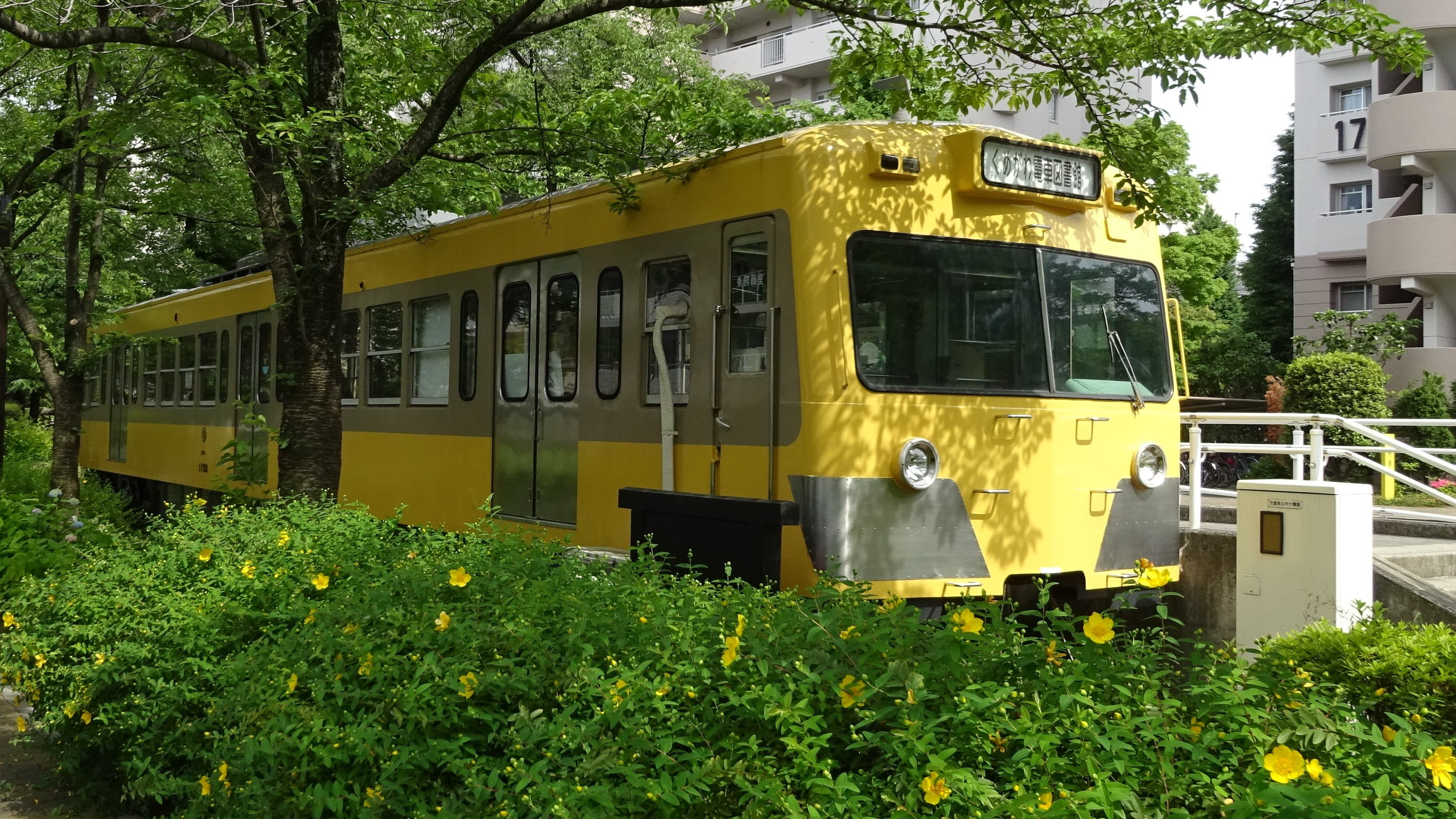
Kumegawa Train Library

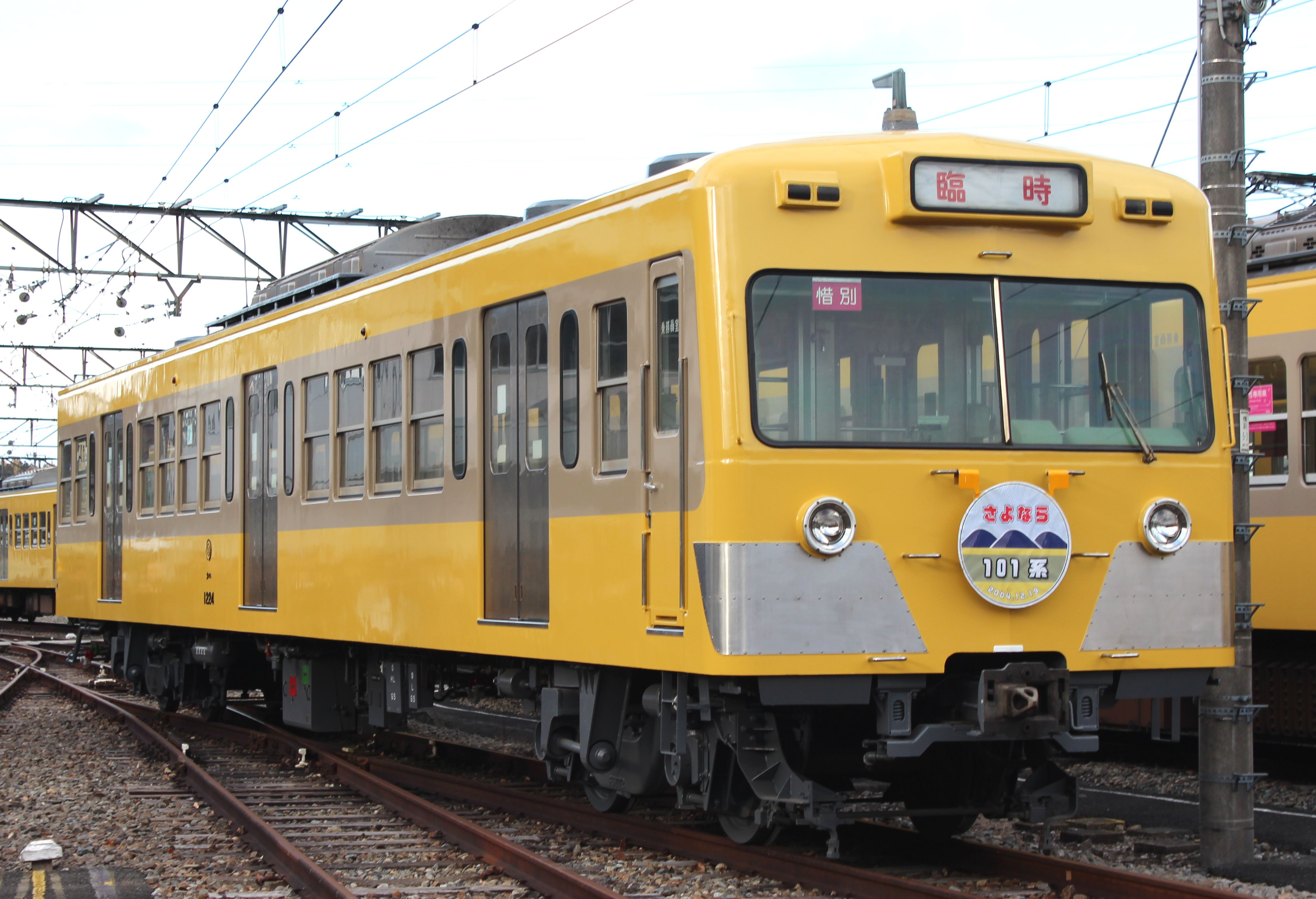
KuHa 1224 at Yokoze yard in December 2012

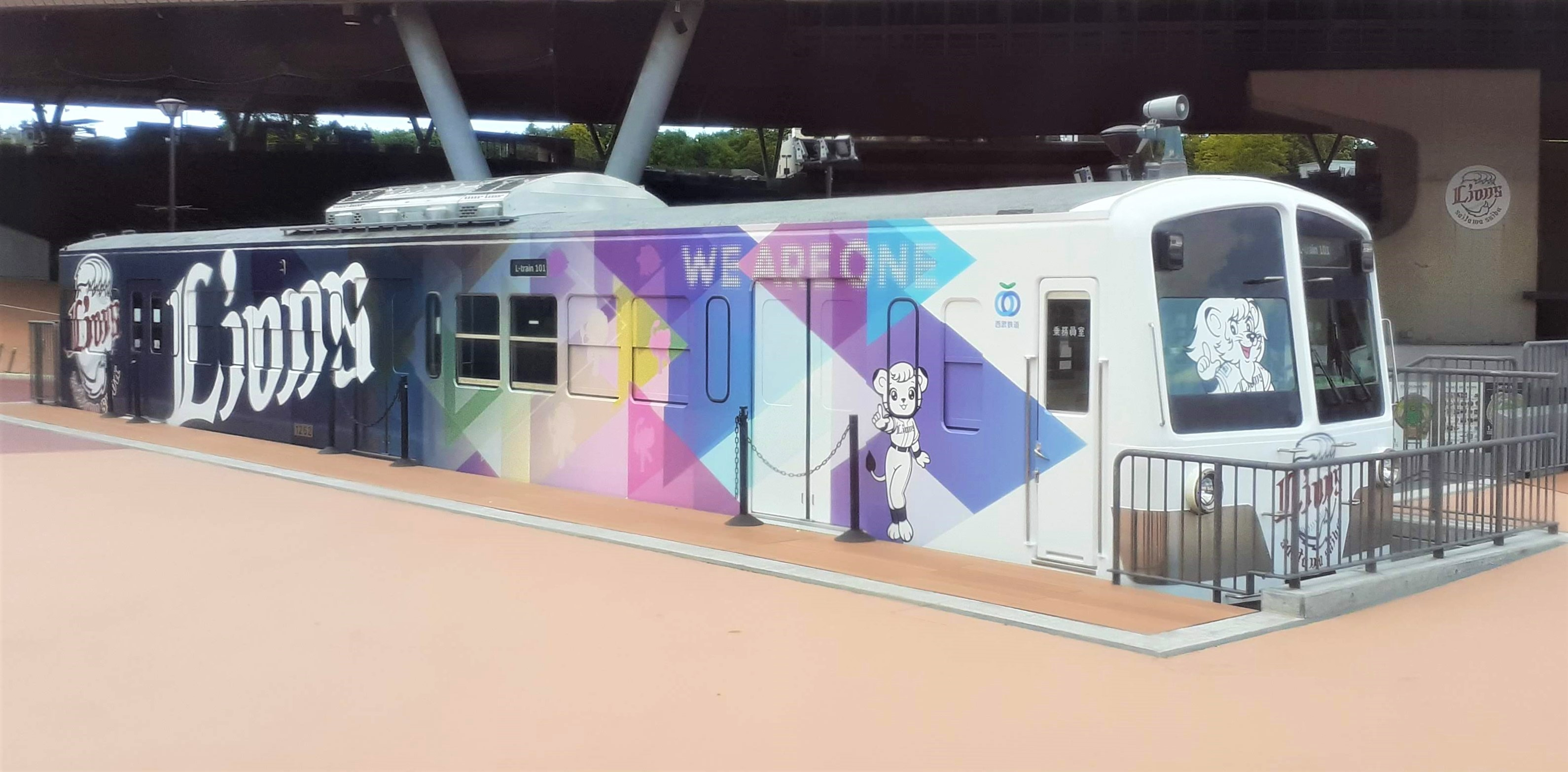
KuHa 1262 in May 2021
