= Shinjuku Station =

Major railway and metro station in Tokyo, Japan

Shinjuku Station 新宿駅
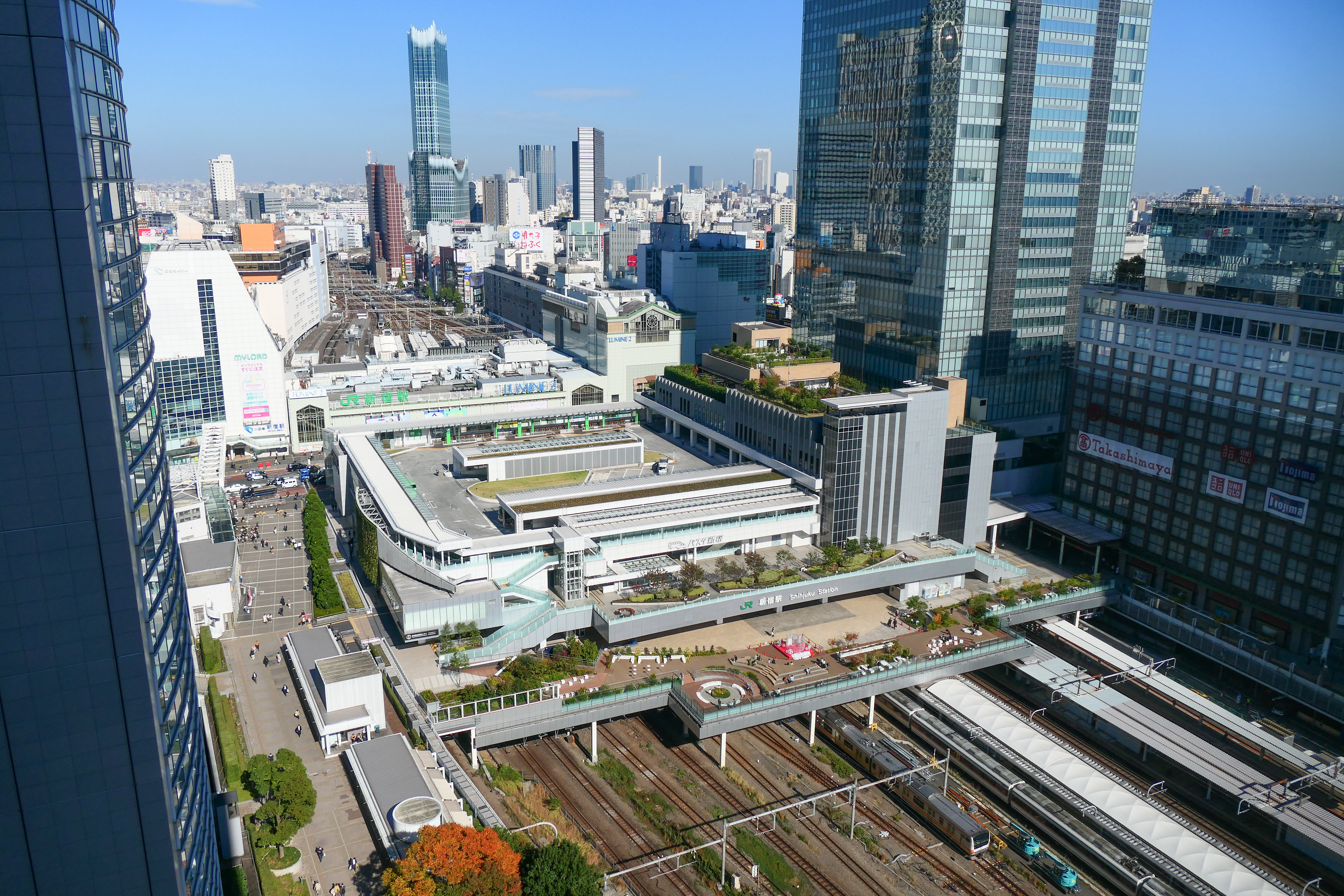
- The south side of Shinjuku Station in November 2022

General information
- Location: Shinjuku and Shibuya wards, Tokyo; Japan
- Coordinates: 35°41′26″N 139°41′58″E
- Operator: JR East; Keio Corporation; Odakyu Electric Railway; Tokyo Metro; Toei Subway
- Connections: Shinjuku Line (Seibu-Shinjuku); Ōedo Line (Shinjuku-nishiguchi); Shinjuku-sanchōme: Marunouchi Line Fukutoshin Line Shinjuku Line: Shinjuku Expressway Bus Terminal; Shinjuku Highway Bus Terminal

Other information
- Status: Active

History
- Opened: 1 March 1885; 141 years ago
Location
- Location within Tokyo Yamanote Loop Location within Tokyo wards area Location within Japan

Shinjuku Station (新宿駅, Shinjuku-eki) is a major railway station in Tokyo, Japan, that serves as the main connecting hub for rail traffic between central/eastern Tokyo (the special wards) and Western Tokyo on the inter-city rail, commuter rail, and subway lines. The station straddles the boundary between the Shinjuku and Shibuya special wards. In Shinjuku, it is in the Nishi-Shinjuku and Shinjuku districts; in Shibuya, it is in the Yoyogi and Sendagaya districts.

The station was used by an average of 3.59 million people per day in 2018, making it the world's busiest railway station by far (and registered as such with Guinness World Records). The main East Japan Railway Company (JR East) station and the directly adjacent private railways have a total of 35 platforms, an underground arcade, above-ground arcade and numerous hallways with another 17 platforms (52 total) that can be accessed through hallways to five directly connected stations without surfacing outside. The entire above/underground complex has well over 200 exits.

== History ==
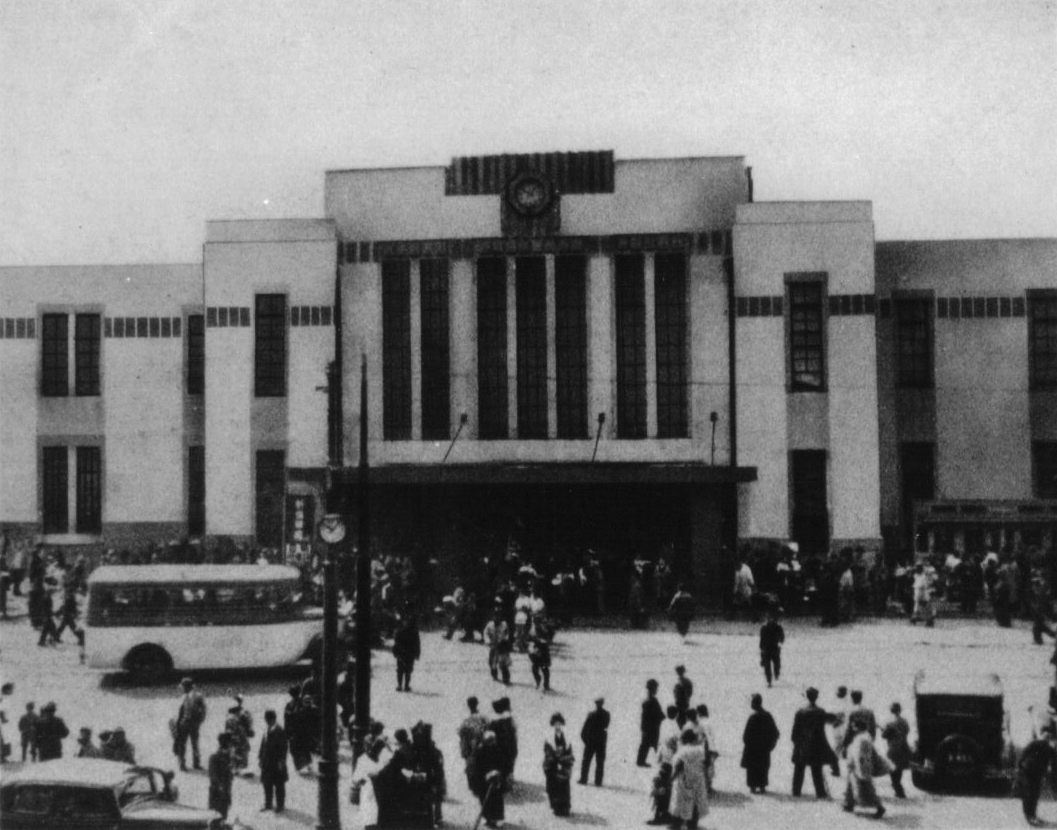
Shinjuku Station in 1925

Shinjuku Station opened in 1885 as a stop on Nippon Railway's Akabane-Shinagawa line (now part of the Yamanote Line). The kanji "新宿" shin juku literally stand for "new (relay-)station". Shinjuku was still a quiet community at the time and the station was not heavily trafficked at first. When the Kobu Railway (now a part of the Chūō Main Line) opened between Shinjuku and Tachikawa Station in 1889, farms were still present near the station. The Keiō Line connected to the station from the west in 1915. Around this period, the east side of the station, where the Naito Shinjuku, a former Shukuba existed, was bustling with people. When the 1923 Great Kantō earthquake happened, the area located in the east side of the station received relatively small damage compared to Nihonbashi. Since the station was a convenient place to travel, many stores relocated near the station after the earthquake. Odakyu Electric Railway opened the Odakyū Odawara Line from Shinjuku to Odawara in 1927. As the platforms of the station were at the west side of the station, traffic in the west exit increased, although it did not compare to that of the east exit.

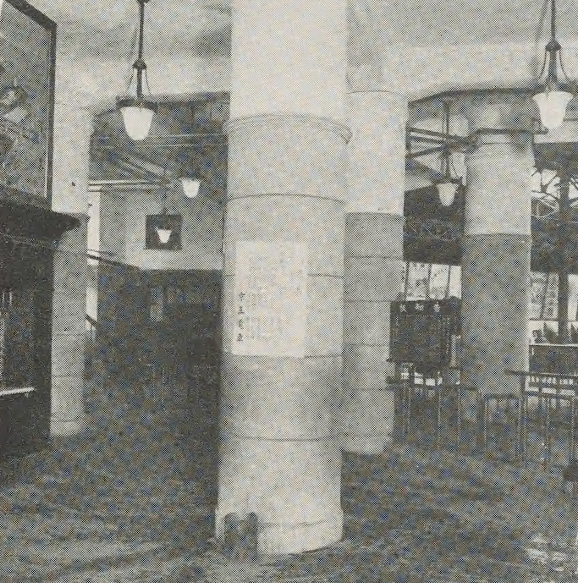
The Concourse of Shinjuku Station in the 1930s

Japanese government urban planner Kensaburo Kondo designed a major revamp of the station in 1933, which included a large public square on the west side completed in 1941. Kondo's plan also called for extending the Tokyu Toyoko Line to a new underground terminal on the west side of the station and constructing an east–west underground line that would be served by the Seibu Railway and the Tokyo Kosoku Railway (forerunner of Tokyo Metro), while the Keio and Odakyu lines would use above-ground terminals to the west of the JR station. These plans were suspended upon the onset of World War II but influenced the current layout of the station area. During World War II, American bombings damaged the substation Keio used to power the railway line, resulting in reduced voltage. This prevented Keio services from using the bridges at the former Kōshū Kaidō. The Keio Shinjuku Station's platforms were forced to relocate to the west side of the station as a result.

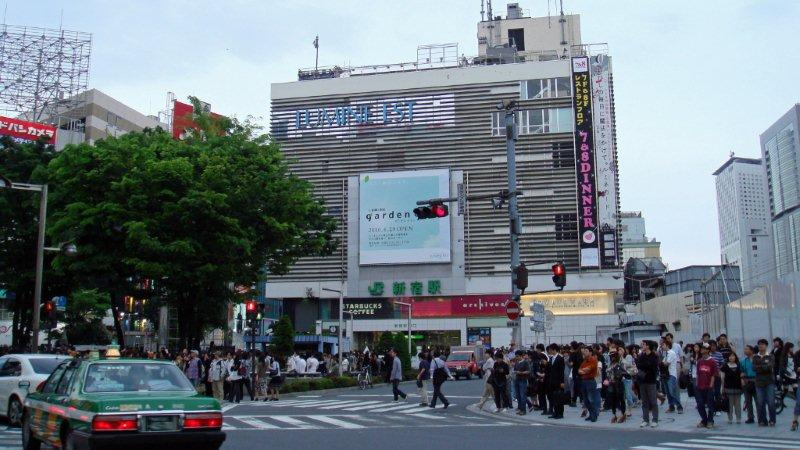
Lumine Est building, originally designed to accommodate the Seibu Shinjuku Line on its second floor

The Seibu Shinjuku Line was extended from Takadanobaba Station to Seibu Shinjuku Station in 1952. Seibu Shinjuku was built as a temporary station pending a planned redevelopment of the east side of Shinjuku Station, which was to feature a large station building that would house a new Seibu terminal on its second floor. Seibu abandoned its plan to use the building due to a lack of space for trains longer than six cars; the building is now known as Lumine Est and retains some design features originally intended to accommodate the Seibu terminal (in particular, a very high ceiling on the first floor and a very low ceiling on the second floor). In the late 1980s, Seibu planned to build an underground terminal on the east side of Shinjuku but indefinitely postponed the plan in 1995 due to costs and declining passenger growth.

On 8 August 1967, a freight train carrying jet fuel bound for the U.S. air bases at Tachikawa and Yokota collided with another freight train and caught fire on the Chūō Rapid tracks. The incident stoked ongoing political controversy in Japan regarding the Vietnam War. The station was a major site for student protests in 1968 and 1969, the height of civil unrest in postwar Japan. On 21 October 1968, 290,000 marchers participated in International Anti-War Day, taking over Shinjuku station and forcing trains to stop. In May and June 1969, members of the antiwar group Beheiren carrying guitars and calling themselves "folk guerrillas" led weekly singalongs in the underground plaza outside the west exit of the station, attracting crowds of thousands. Participants described it as a "liberated zone" and a "community of encounter." In July, riot police cleared the plaza with tear gas and changed signs in the station to read "West Exit Concourse" instead of "West Exit Plaza."

There have been plans at various points in history to connect Shinjuku to the Shinkansen network, and the 1973 Shinkansen Basic Plan, still in force, specifies that the station should be the southern terminus of the Jōetsu Shinkansen line to Niigata. While construction of the Ōmiya-Shinjuku link never started and the Jōetsu line presently terminates in Tokyo Station, the right of way, including an area underneath the station, remains reserved.

On 5 May 1995, the Aum Shinrikyo doomsday cult attempted a chemical terrorist attack by setting off a cyanide gas device in a toilet in the underground concourse, barely a month after the gas attack on the Tokyo subway (which had killed 13, left 6,252 people with non-fatal injuries, severely injured 50 people, and caused 984 cases of temporary vision problems). The attack was thwarted by staff who extinguished the burning device.

The station facilities on the Marunouchi Line were inherited by Tokyo Metro after the privatization of the Teito Rapid Transit Authority (TRTA) in 2004. Station numbering was introduced to the Odakyu terminal in 2014 with Shinjuku being assigned station number OH01. A major expansion of the JR terminal was completed in April 2016, adding a 32-story office tower, bus terminal, taxi terminal, and numerous shops and restaurants.

Station numbering was introduced to the JR East platforms in 2016 with Shinjuku being assigned station numbers JB10 for the Chūō-Sobu line, JS20 for the Shonan-Shinjuku line, JA11 for the Saikyō line, JC05 for the Chuo line rapid, and JY17 for the Yamanote line. At the same time, JR East assigned the station a 3-letter code to its major transfer stations; Shinjuku was assigned the code "SJK".

In 2020, the east–west free passageway was opened, shortening the time required for pedestrians to pass between the east and west exits by 10 minutes. A major redevelopment of the station and the surrounding area began in July 2021 with the aim of improving pedestrian flow and making it easier and faster to cut through the east and west sides of the station. Construction is expected to continue until 2047.

=== Keiō Shinjuku Station ===
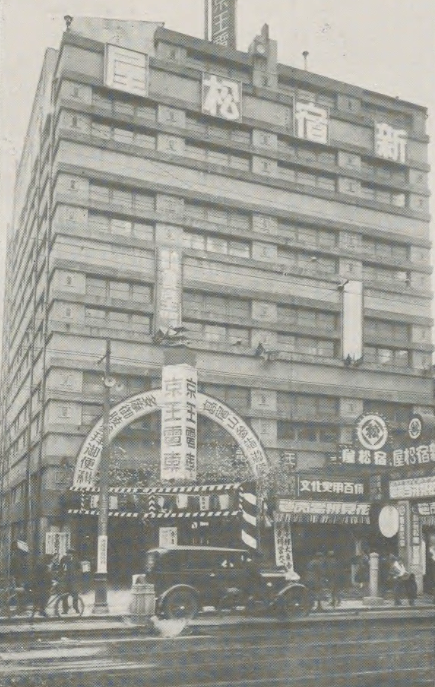
Keio Shinjuku Station and the Matsuya Department Store Building (1936)

When the Keio Line extended to Shinjuku in 1915, its terminal was located several blocks east of the government railway (presently JR) station. The terminal was first named Shinjuku-Oiwake Station (新宿追分駅) and was on the street near the Isetan department store. In 1927, the station was moved from the street to a newly built terminal adjacent to the original station. The station building housed a department store. The station name was changed to Yotsuya-Shinjuku Station (四谷新宿駅) in 1930 and again to Keiō Shinjuku Station (京王新宿駅) in 1937.

The tracks from the terminal were on the Kōshū Kaidō highway, which crosses the Yamanote Line and the Chūō Line in front of the south entrance of Shinjuku Station by a bridge. The Keiō Line had a station for access to Shinjuku Station, named Teishajō-mae Station (停車場前駅) and renamed in 1937 Shōsen Shinjuku Ekimae Station (省線新宿駅前駅).

In July 1945, the terminal of the Keiō Line was relocated to the present location, though on the ground level, on the west side of Shinjuku Station. Keiō Shinjuku Station and Shōsen Shinjuku Ekimae Station were closed. This was because the trains faced difficulty in climbing up the slopes of the bridge over the governmental railway after one of the nearby transformer substations was destroyed by an air raid. The site of Keiō Shinjuku Station near Shinjuku-Sanchōme subway station is now occupied by two buildings owned by Keiō: Keiō Shinjuku Sanchōme Building and Keiō Shinjuku Oiwake Building.

== Lines ==
Shinjuku is served by the following railway systems:

- JR East:
  - ■ Chūō Main Line (Limited Express)
  - Chūō Line (Rapid)
  - Chūō-Sōbu Line
  - Saikyō Line
  - Shōnan–Shinjuku Line
  - Yamanote Line
- Keio Corporation:
  - Keio Line
  - Keio New Line
- Odakyu Electric Railway:
  - Odakyu Odawara Line
- Toei Subway:
  - Ōedo Line
  - Shinjuku Line
- Tokyo Metro:
  - Marunouchi Line

== Station facilities ==
=== JR East ===
SJKJY17 JC05 JB10 JS20 JA11 Shinjuku Station 新宿駅
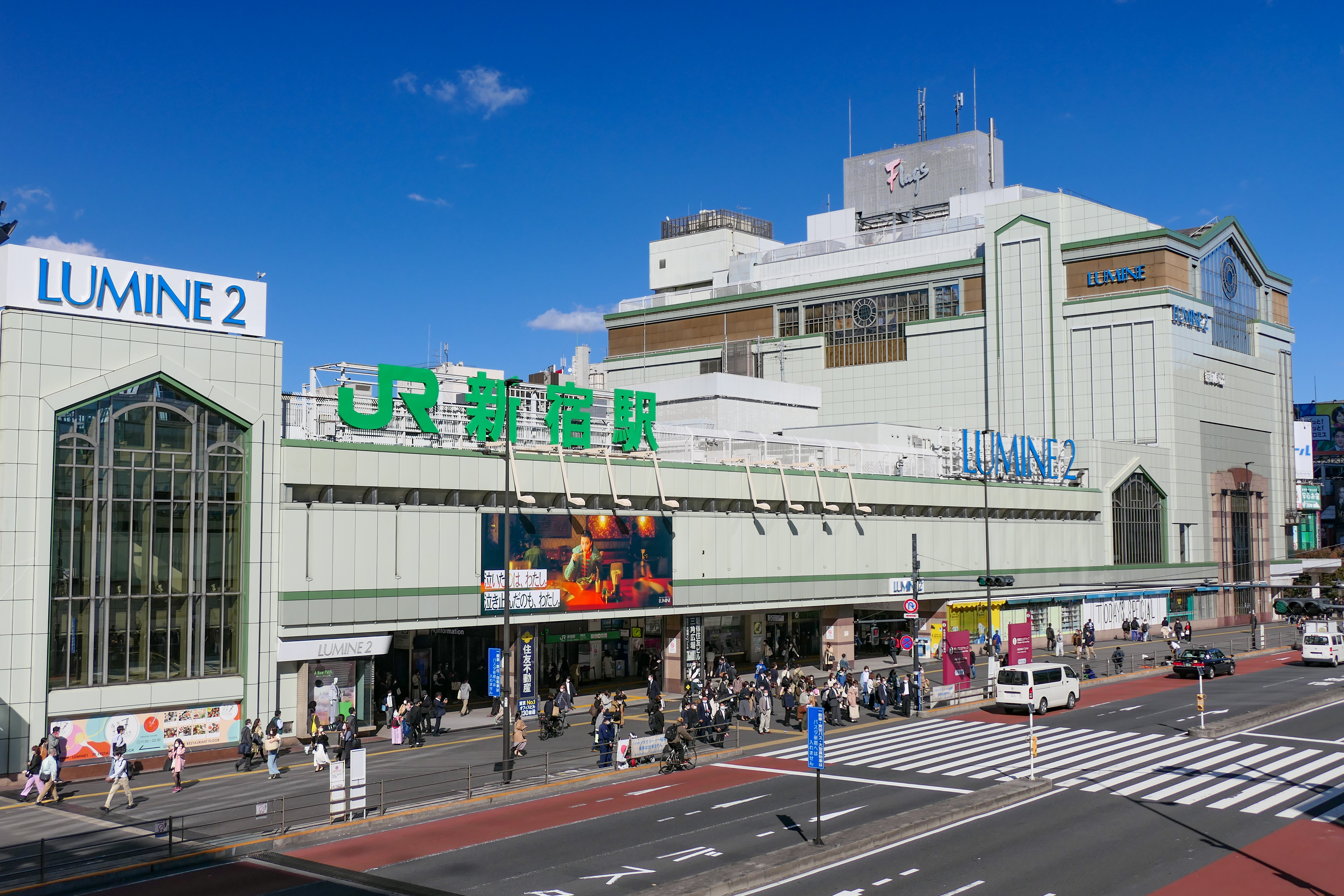
- Shinjuku Station south entrance in October 2021

General information
- Location: 3-38-1 Shinjuku, Shinjuku City, Tokyo; Japan
- Operator: JR East
- Lines: Yamanote Line; Chūō Line (Chūō Main Line); Chūō–Sōbu Line (Chūō Main Line); Shōnan–Shinjuku Line; Saikyō Line
- Platforms: 8 island platforms
- Tracks: 16
- Connections: Bus terminal

Construction
- Structure type: At grade
- Accessible: Yes

Other information
- Station code: SJK

History
- Opened: 1 March 1885; 141 years ago

Passengers
- FY2024: 1,333,618 daily

Services
Preceding station	JR East	Following station
Yoyogi JY18 Next counter-clockwise	Yamanote Line	Shin-Ōkubo JY16 Next clockwise
Tachikawa JC19 towards Hakuba	Azusa	Kinshichō JO22 towards Chiba
Tachikawa JC19 towards Hakuba	Azusa	Tokyo Terminus
Tachikawa JC19 towards Ryūō	Kaiji	Tokyo (limited service) Terminus
Tachikawa JC19 towards Ōtsuki	Fuji Excursion	Kinshichō One-way operation
Kokubunji One-way operation	Chūō Line Commuter Special Rapid	Yotsuya JC04 towards Tokyo
Nakano JC06 towards Ōtsuki	Chūō Line Chūō Special Rapid	Yotsuya JC04 towards Tokyo
Nakano JC06 towards Tachikawa	Chūō Line Ōme Special Rapid	Yotsuya JC04 towards Tokyo
Nakano JC06 towards Ōtsuki	Chūō Line Commuter Rapid	Yotsuya One-way operation
Nakano JC06 towards Ōtsuki	Chūō Line Rapid	Yotsuya JC04 towards Tokyo
Ōkubo JB09 towards Mitaka	Chūō–Sōbu Line	Yoyogi JB11 towards Chiba
Terminus	Narita Express	Shibuya towards Narita Airport Terminal 1
Shibuya towards Itō	Saphir Odoriko	Terminus
Shibuya towards Odawara	Shōnan	Terminus
Terminus	Nikkō and Kinugawa	Ikebukuro towards Tōbu Nikkō or Kinugawa-Onsen
Shibuya towards Odawara or Zushi	Shōnan–Shinjuku Line Special Rapid Rapid Local	Ikebukuro towards Takasaki, Maebashi or Utsunomiya
Shibuya towards Ōsaki	Saikyō Line Commuter Rapid Rapid Local	Ikebukuro towards Ōmiya
Shibuya towards Ebina	Sōtetsu–JR Link Line	Terminus
Location

The station is centered around facilities servicing the East Japan Railway Company (JR East) lines. These consist of eight ground-level island platforms (16 tracks) on a north–south axis, connected by two overhead and two underground concourses. Most JR services here are urban and suburban mass transit lines, although many limited express services to Kōfu and Matsumoto on the Chūō Main Line and to Nikkō and Kinugawa Onsen via joint operations with the private Tōbu Railway also begin and end at this station, including Narita Express services to and from Narita International Airport. The JR section alone handles an average of 1.5 million passengers a day.

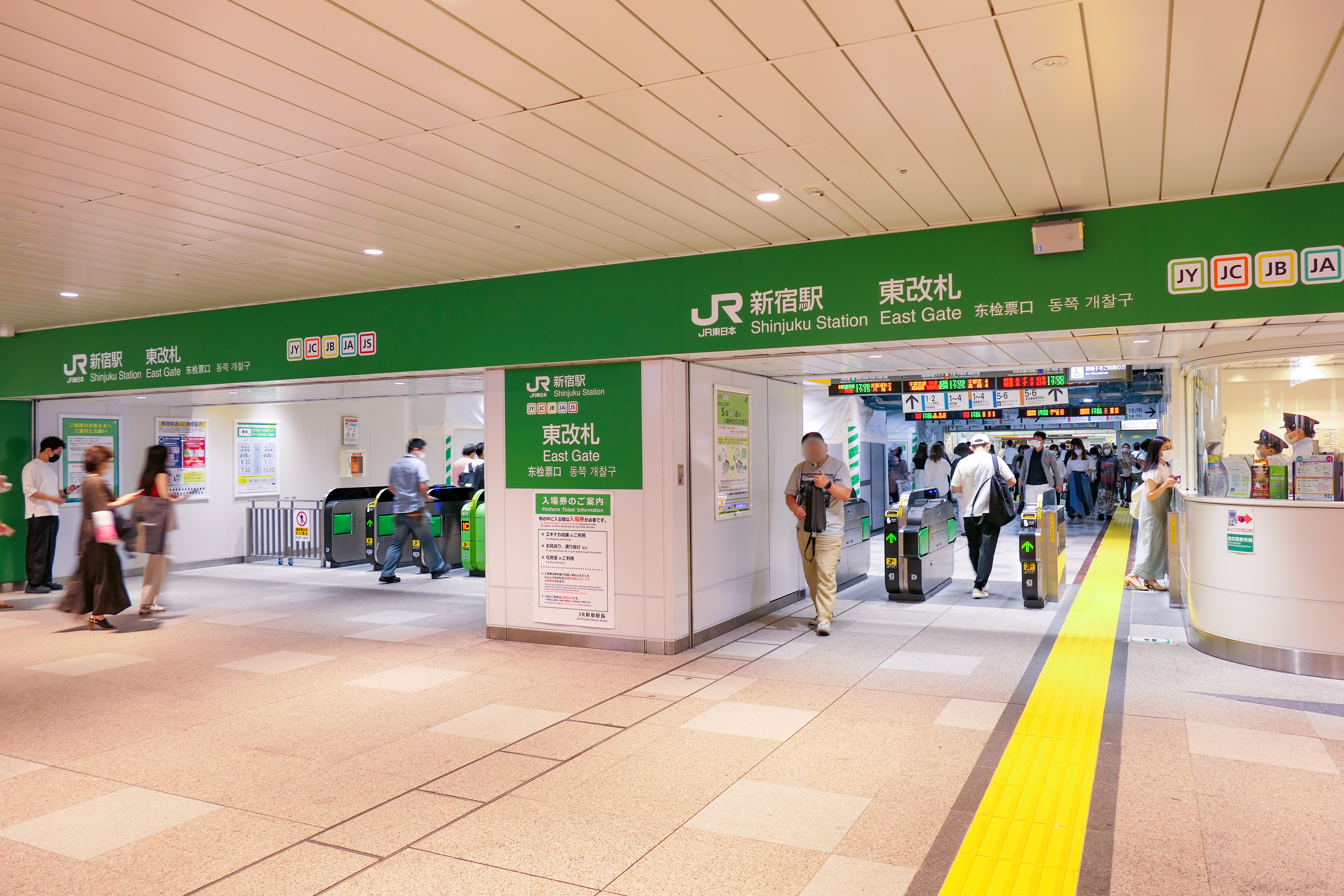
East gates in July 2021

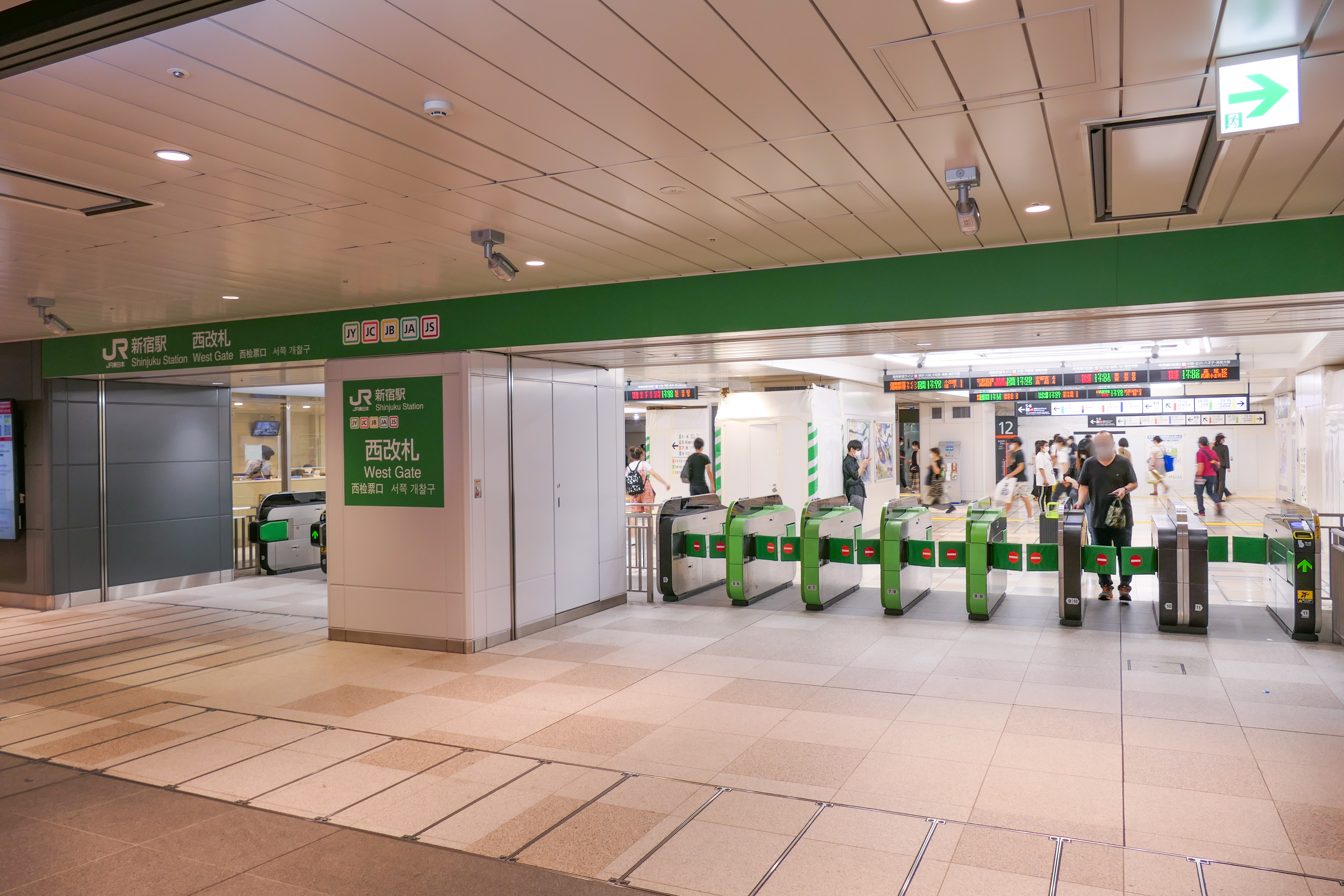
West gates in July 2021

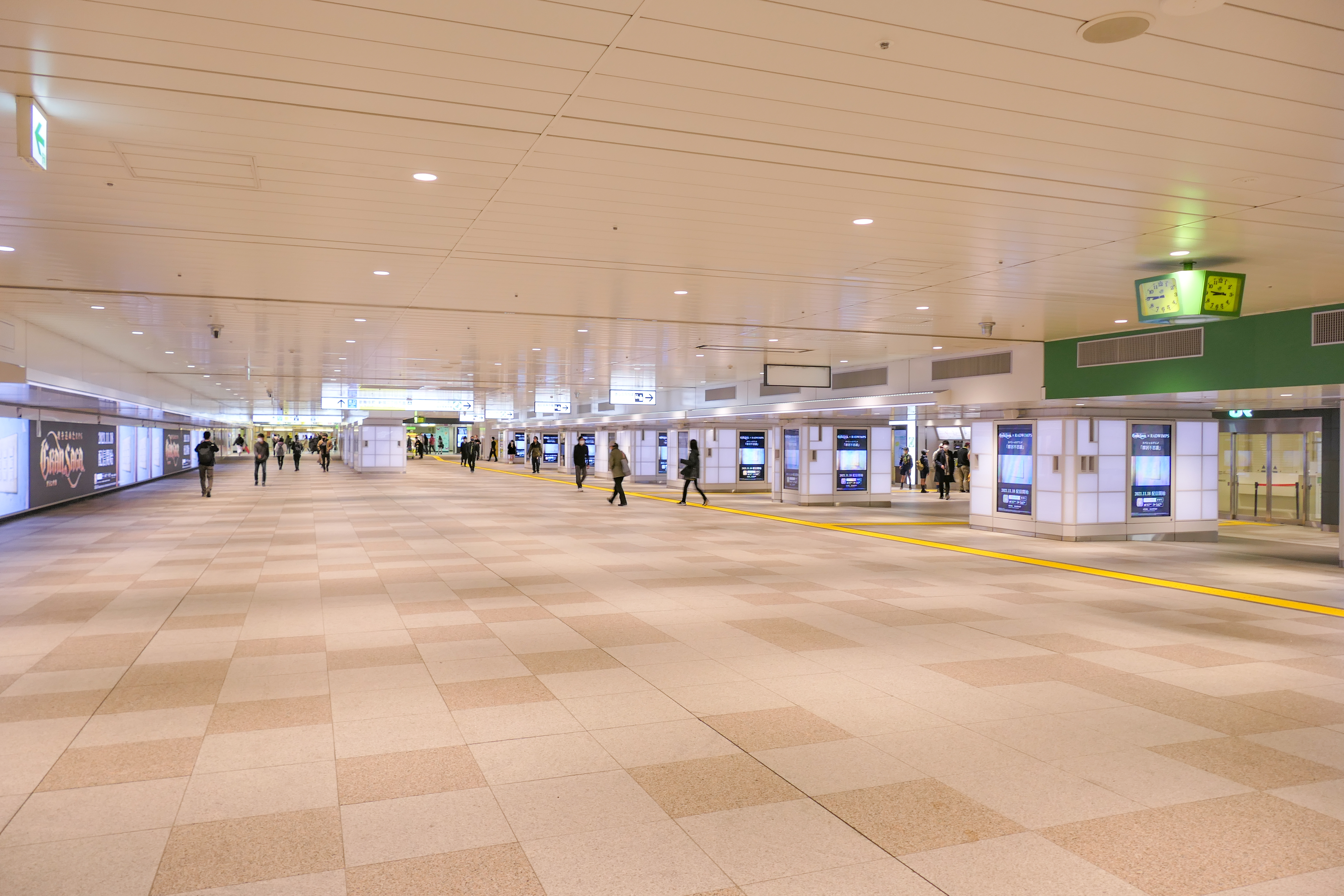
Internal concourse in July 2021

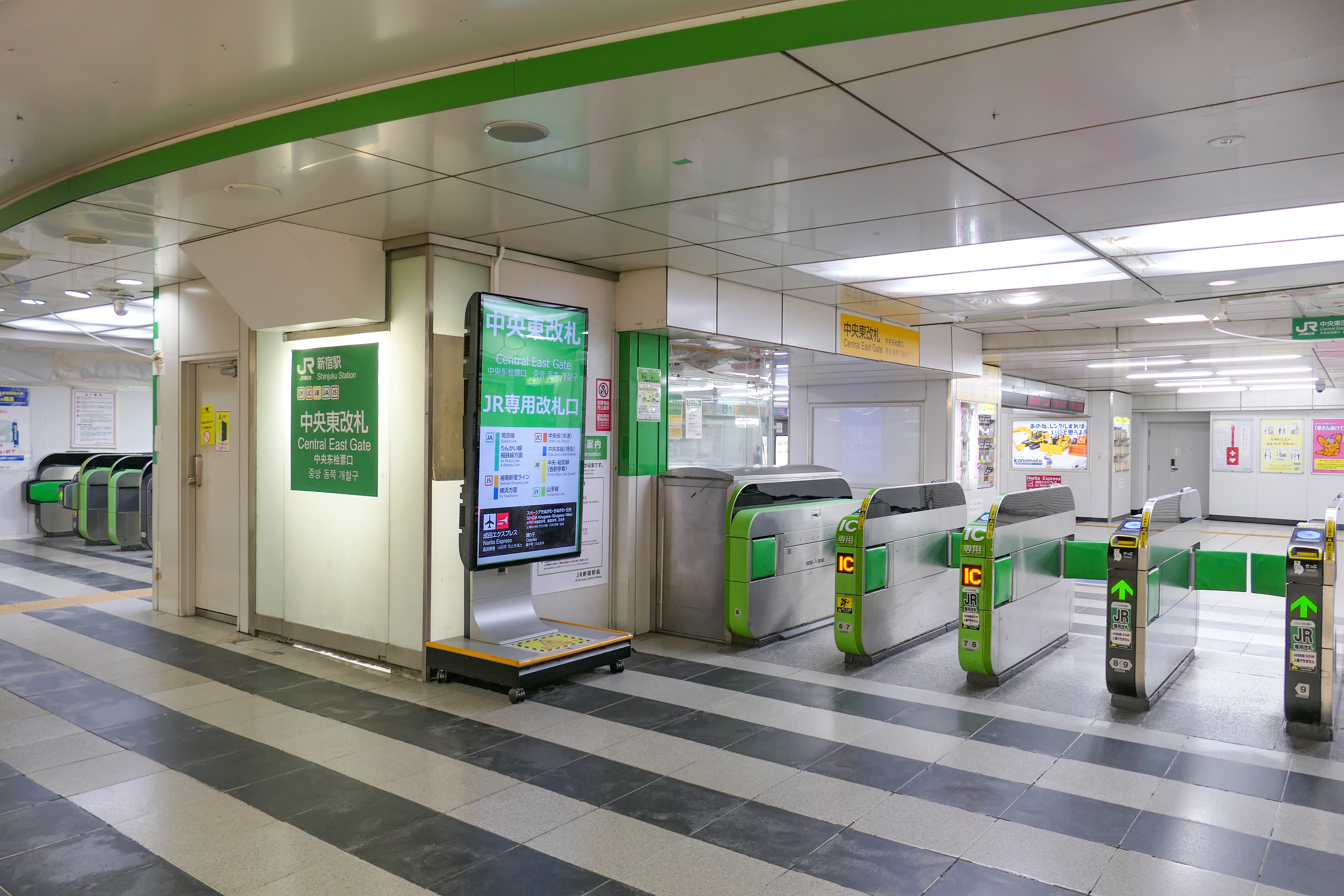
Central East gates in November 2021

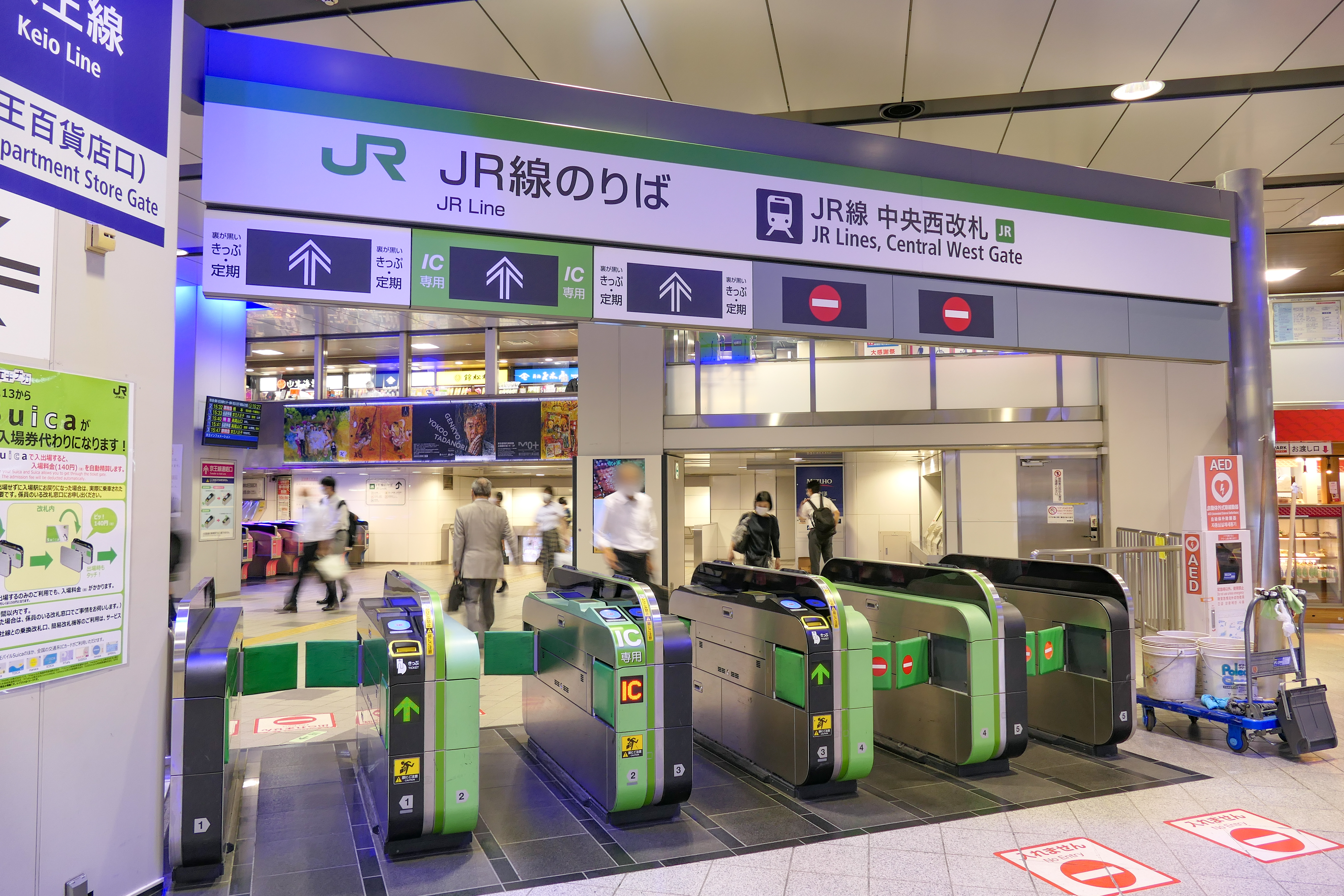
Central West gates in September 2021

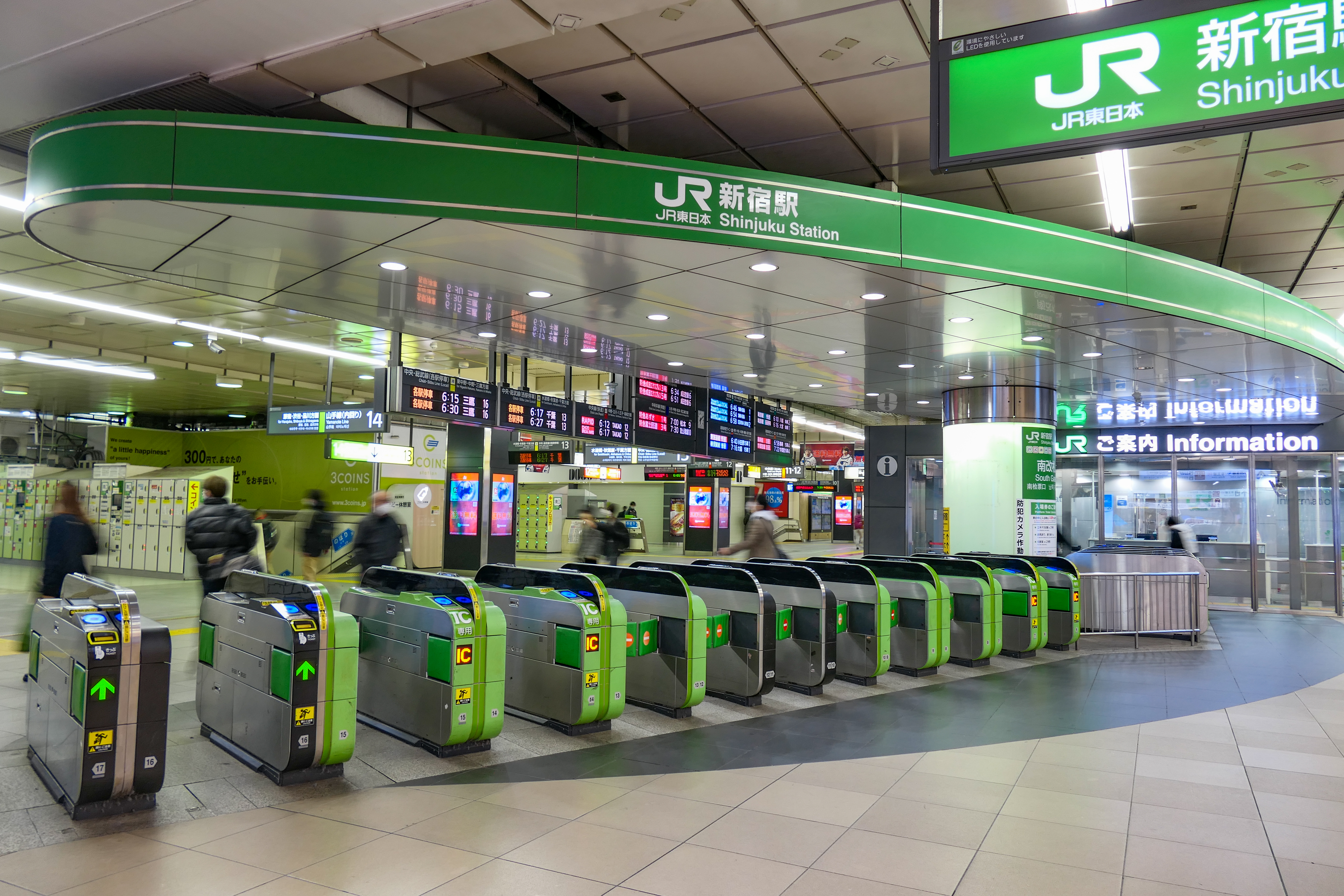
Central South gates in November 2021

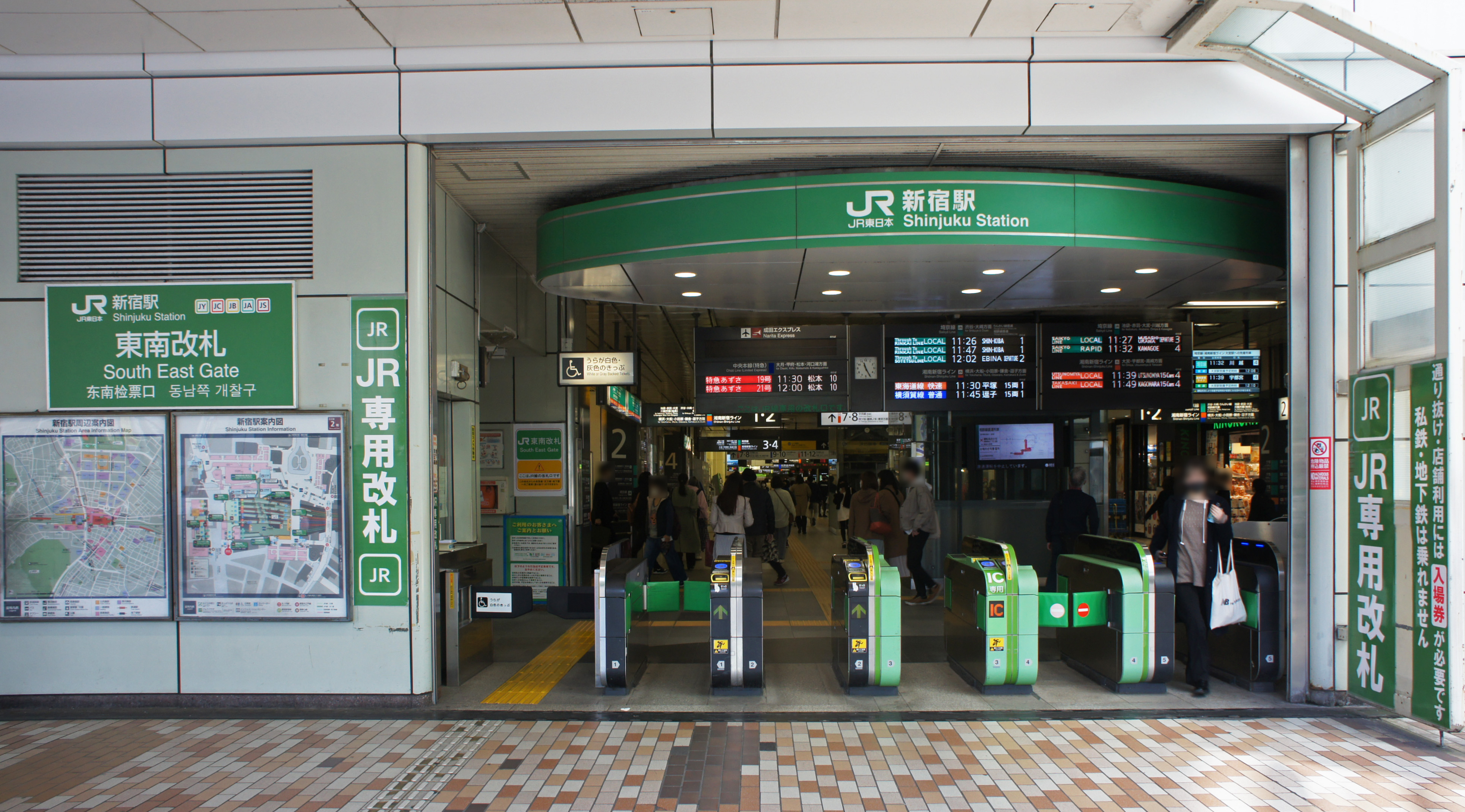
South East gates in April 2021

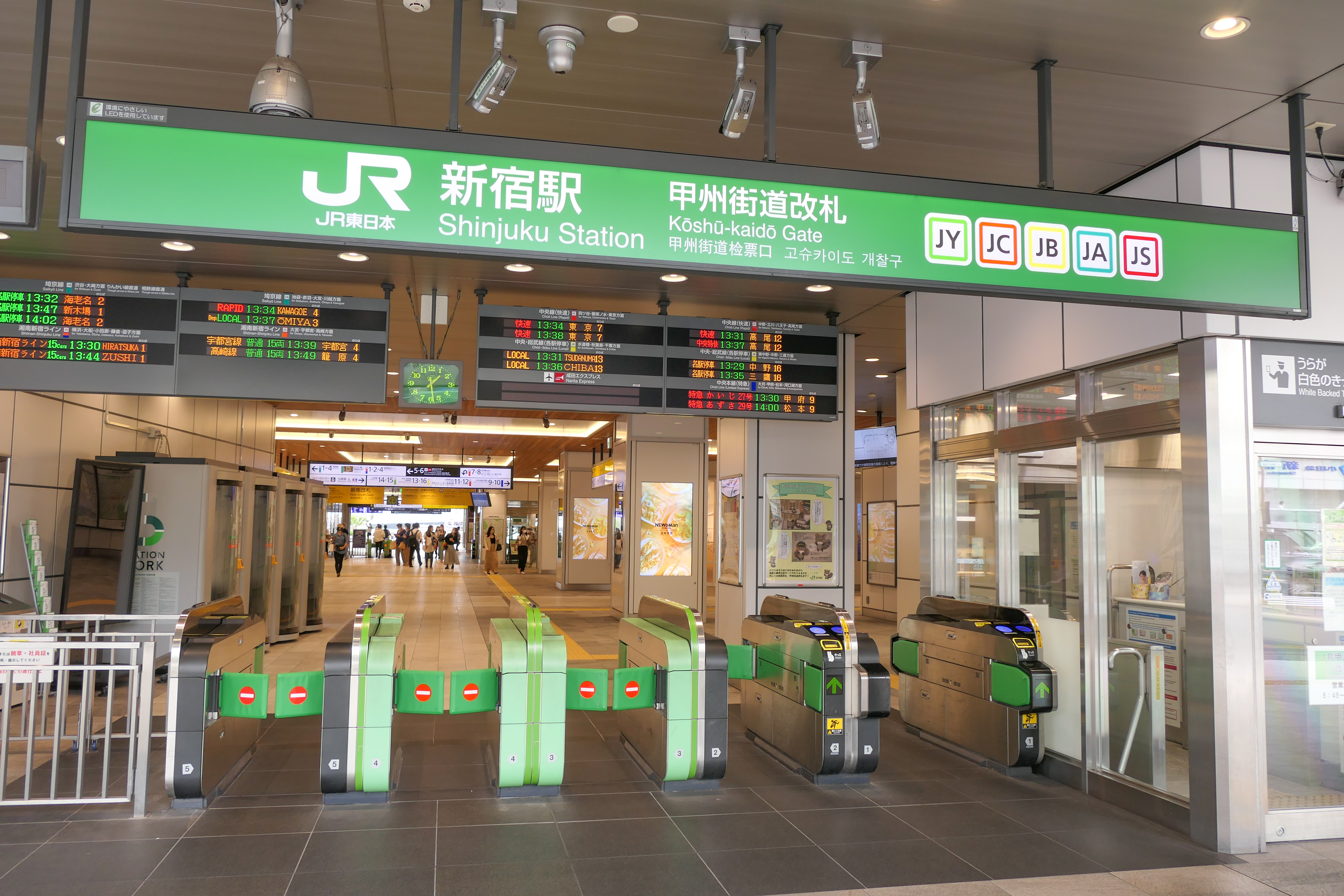
Koshu Kaido gates in September 2021

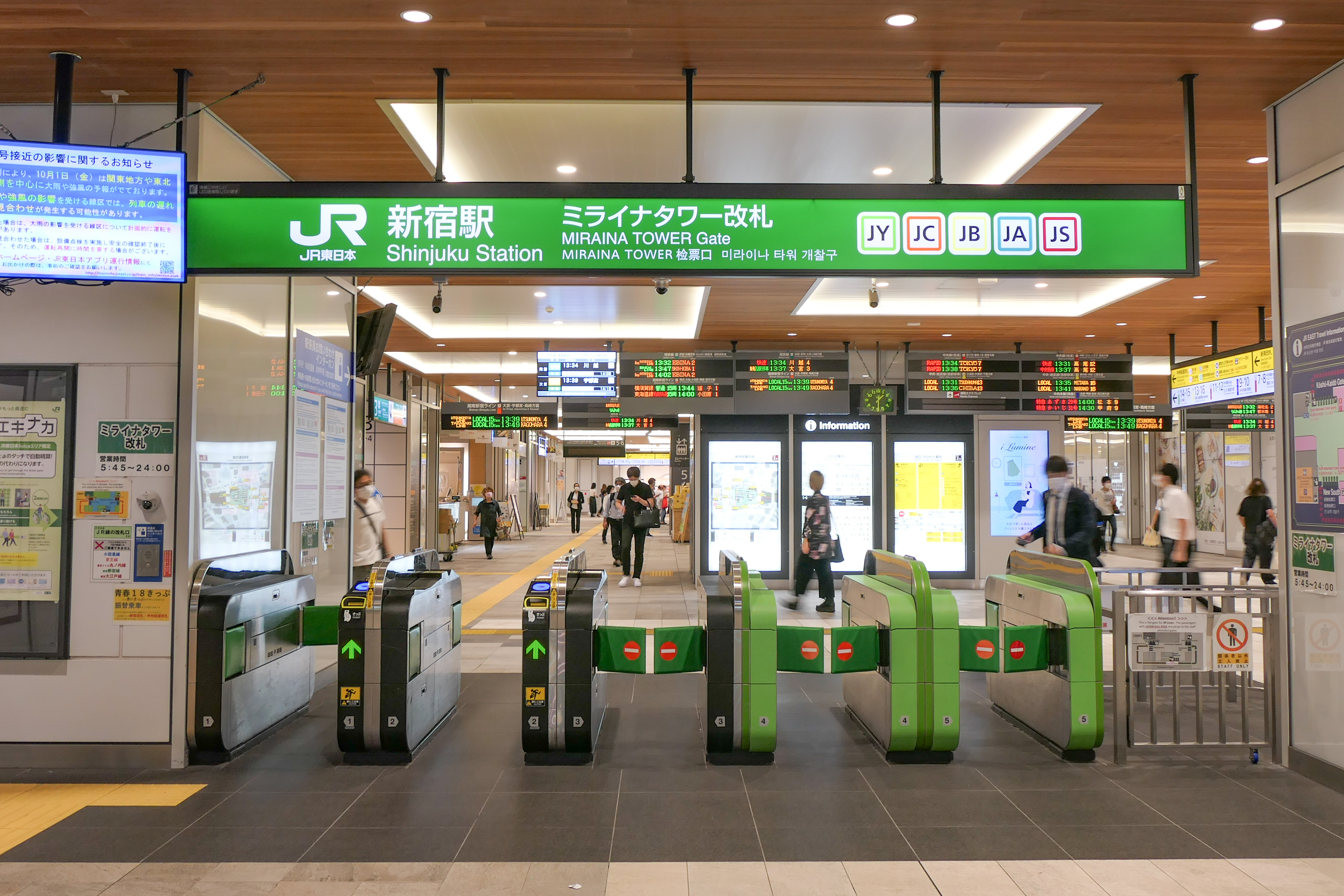
Miraina Tower gates in September 2021

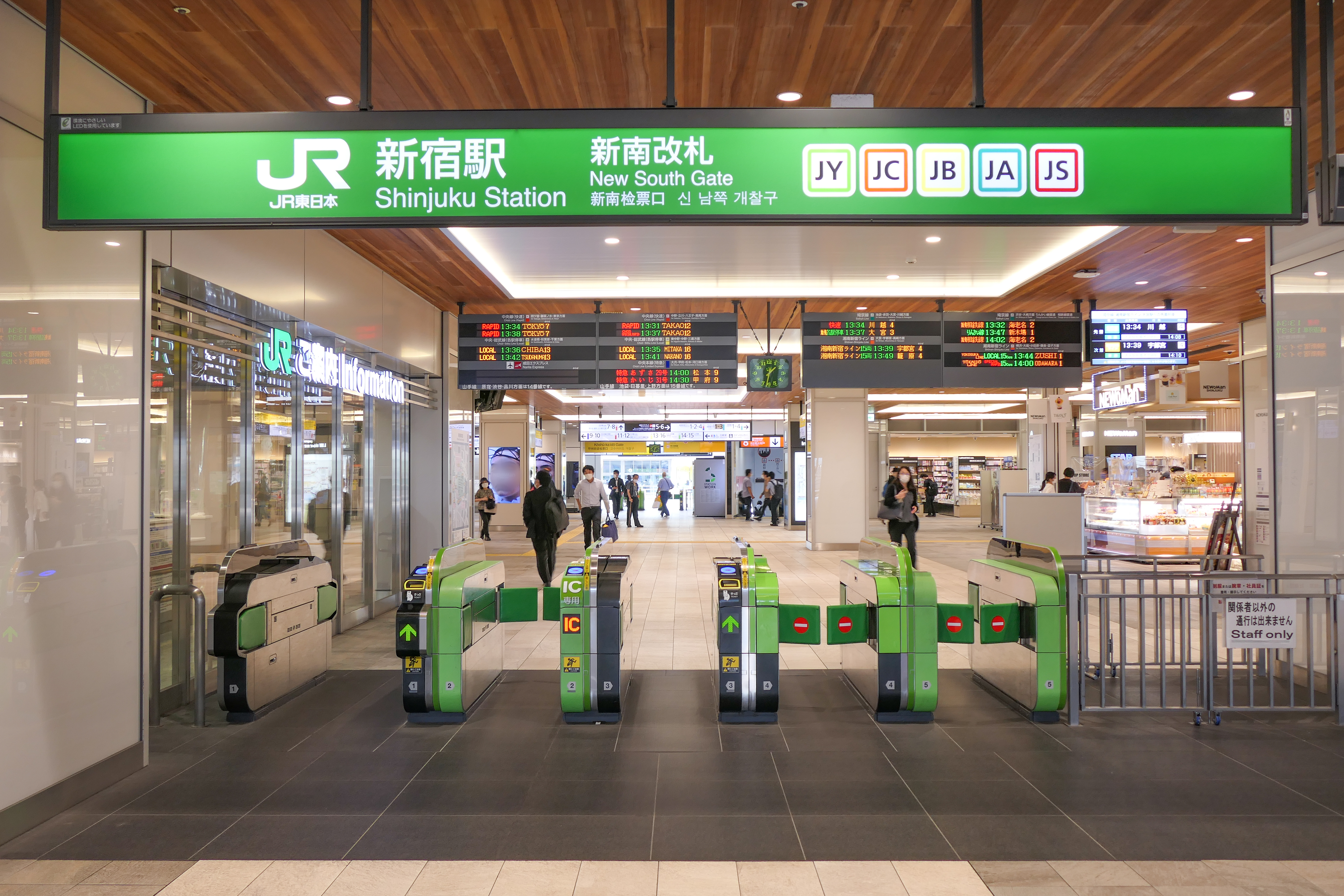
New South gates in September 2021

1-2	Saikyō Line	for Shibuya, Ōsaki, and Shin-Kiba (via the Rinkai Line)
1-2	Saikyō Line	for Hazawa yokohama-kokudai and Ebina (via the Sōtetsu Line)
1-2	Saikyō Line	for Ikebukuro, Ōmiya, and Kawagoe (via the ■ Kawagoe Line)
1-2	Shōnan-Shinjuku Line	for Yokohama, Ōfuna, Chigasaki, Hiratsuka, Kōzu, and Odawara (via the Tōkaidō Main Line)
1-2	Shōnan-Shinjuku Line	for Yokohama, Ōfuna, Kamakura, and Zushi (via the Yokosuka Line)
3	Saikyō Line	for Ikebukuro, Ōmiya, and Kawagoe (via the ■ Kawagoe Line)
4	Saikyō Line	for Ikebukuro, Ōmiya, and Kawagoe (via the ■ Kawagoe Line)
4	Shōnan-Shinjuku Line	for Ōmiya, Kumagaya, and Takasaki (via the Takasaki Line)
4	Shōnan-Shinjuku Line	for Ōmiya, Oyama, and Utsunomiya (via the Utsunomiya Line)
5-6	■ Limited Express	■ Shonan for Odawara
5-6	■ Limited Express	■ Saphir ODORIKO for Izukyu Shimoda
5-6	■ Limited Express	■ Kinugawa for Kinugawa-Onsen
5-6	■ Limited Express	■ Narita Express for Narita Airport
5-6	■ Limited Express	■ Nikkō for Tōbu Nikkō
7-8	Chūō Line (Rapid)	for Ochanomizu and Tokyo
7-8	Chūō Line (Rapid)	Ltd. Express Hachiōji / Ōme for Tokyo
7-8	Chūō Line (Rapid)	■ Ltd. Express Azusa / Kaiji for Tokyo (Note: Azusa No. 4, 8, 12 and 16, as well as Kaiji No. 2, 6, 10 and 14 continue to Tokyo.) and Chiba (Note: Azusa No. 50 continues to Chiba.)
7-8	Chūō Line (Rapid)	■ Ltd. Express Shinjuku Sazanami for Chiba and Tateyama
7-8	Chūō Line (Rapid)	■ Ltd. Express Shinjuku Wakashio for Chiba and Awa-Kamogawa
9-10	Chūō Line (Rapid)	Ltd. Express Hachiōji for Hachiōji
9-10	Chūō Line (Rapid)	Ltd. Express Ōme for Ōme
9-10	Chūō Line (Rapid)	Holiday Rapid Okutama for Okutama
9-10	■ Chūō Main Line	Ltd. Express Azusa for Matsumoto and Minami-Otari
9-10	■ Chūō Main Line	Ltd. Express Fuji Excursion for Kawaguchiko
9-10	■ Chūō Main Line	Ltd. Express Kaiji for Kōfu and Ryūō
11-12	Chūō Line (Rapid)	for Nakano, Tachikawa, Hachiōji, Takao, and Ōtsuki
11-12	Chūō Line (Rapid)	for Haijima and Ōme (via the Ōme Line)
13	Chūō-Sōbu Line	for Suidōbashi, Akihabara, and Chiba
14	Yamanote Line (counter-clockwise)	for Harajuku, Shibuya, and Shinagawa
15	Yamanote Line (clockwise)	for Ikebukuro, Tabata, Nippori, and Ueno
16	Chūō-Sōbu Line	for Higashi-Nakano, Nakano, and Mitaka

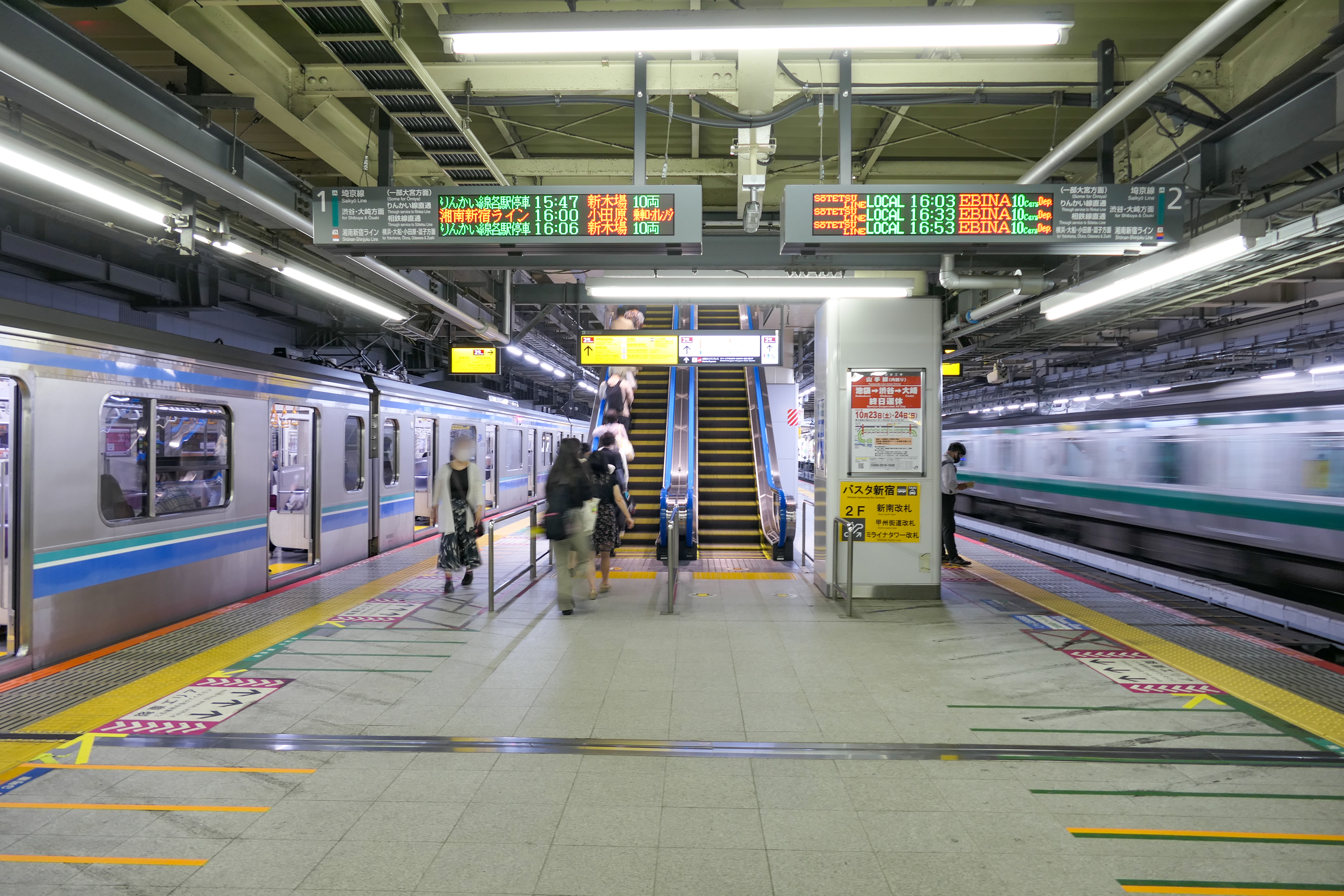
JR East platforms 1 and 2

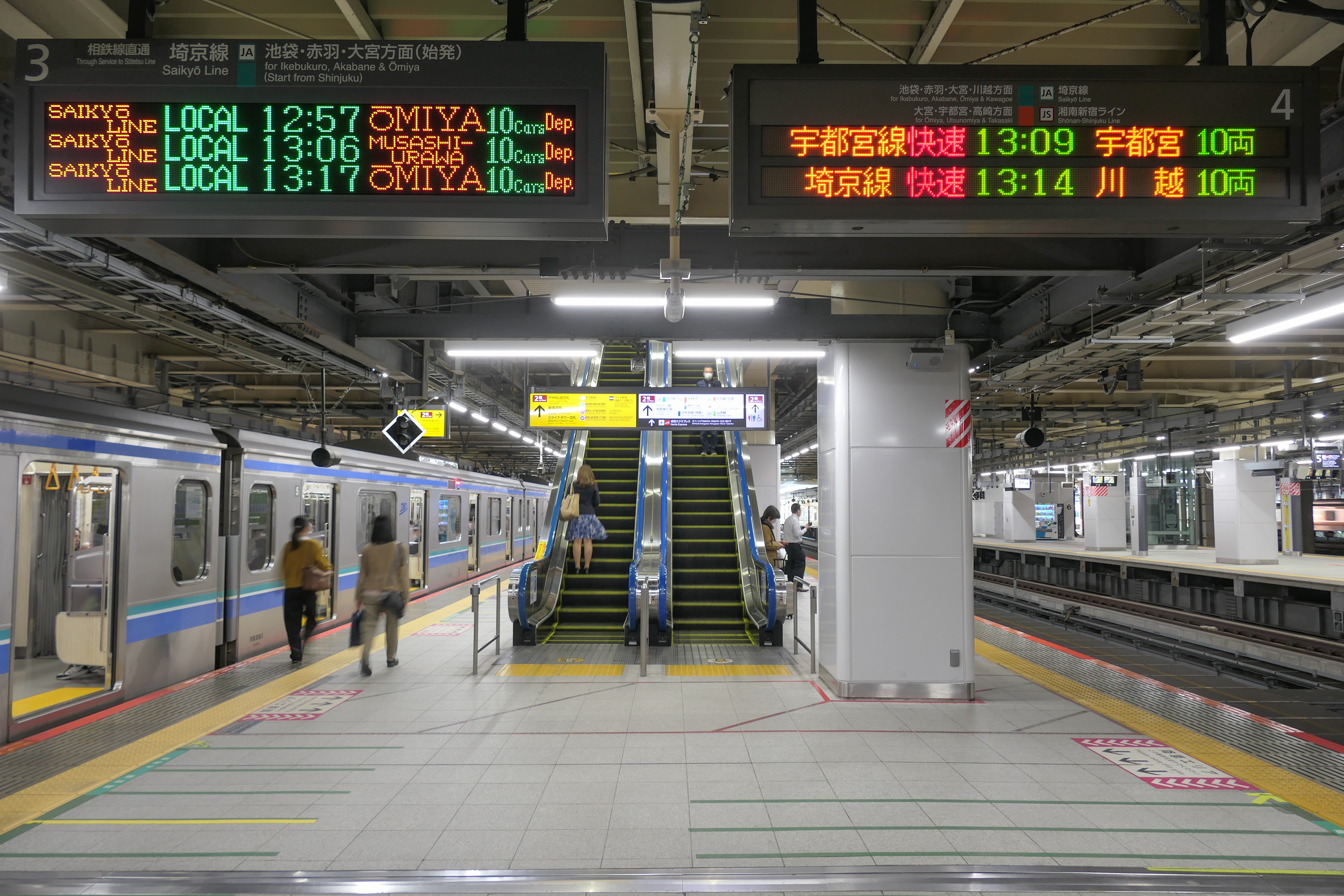
JR East platforms 3 and 4

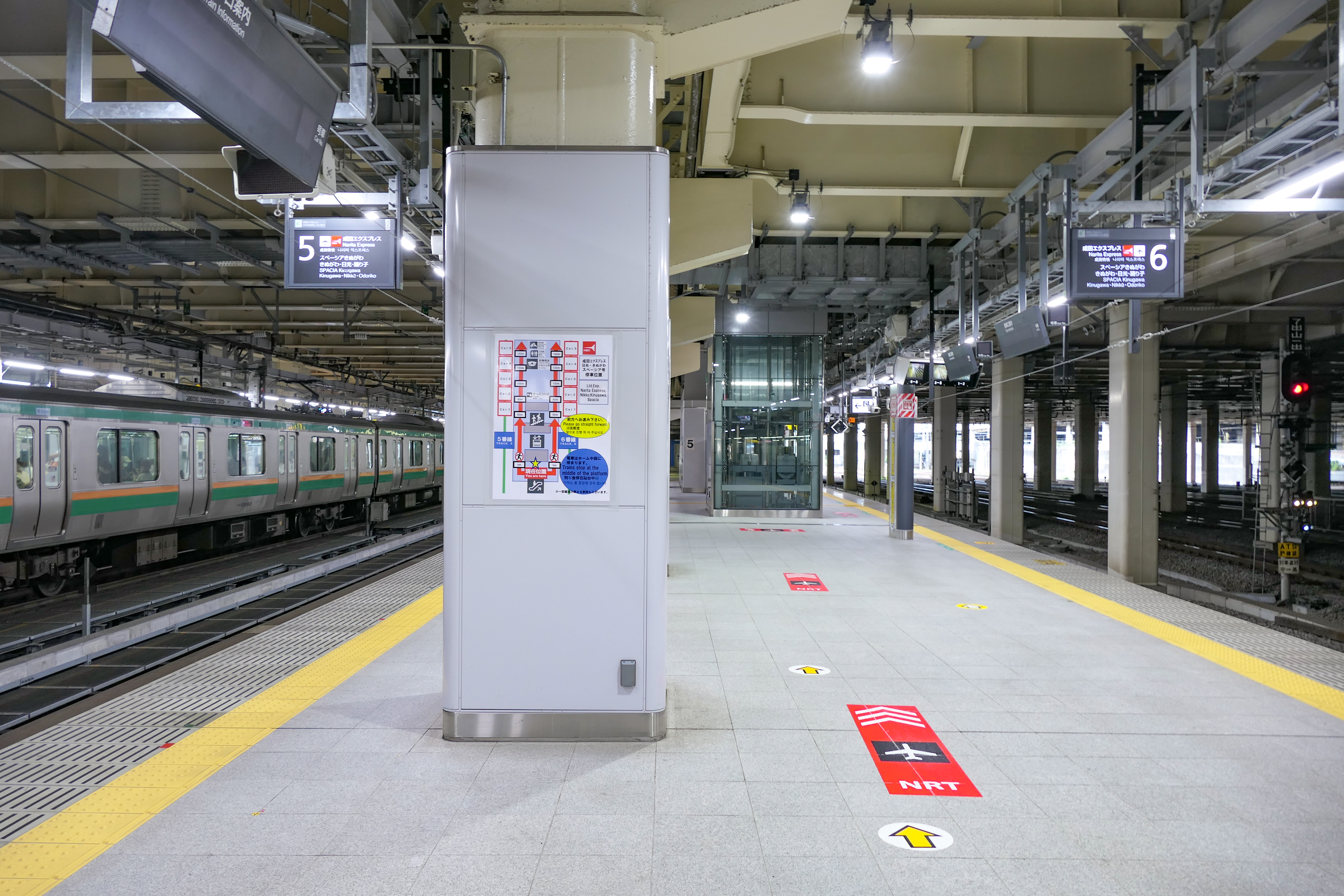
JR East platforms 5 and 6

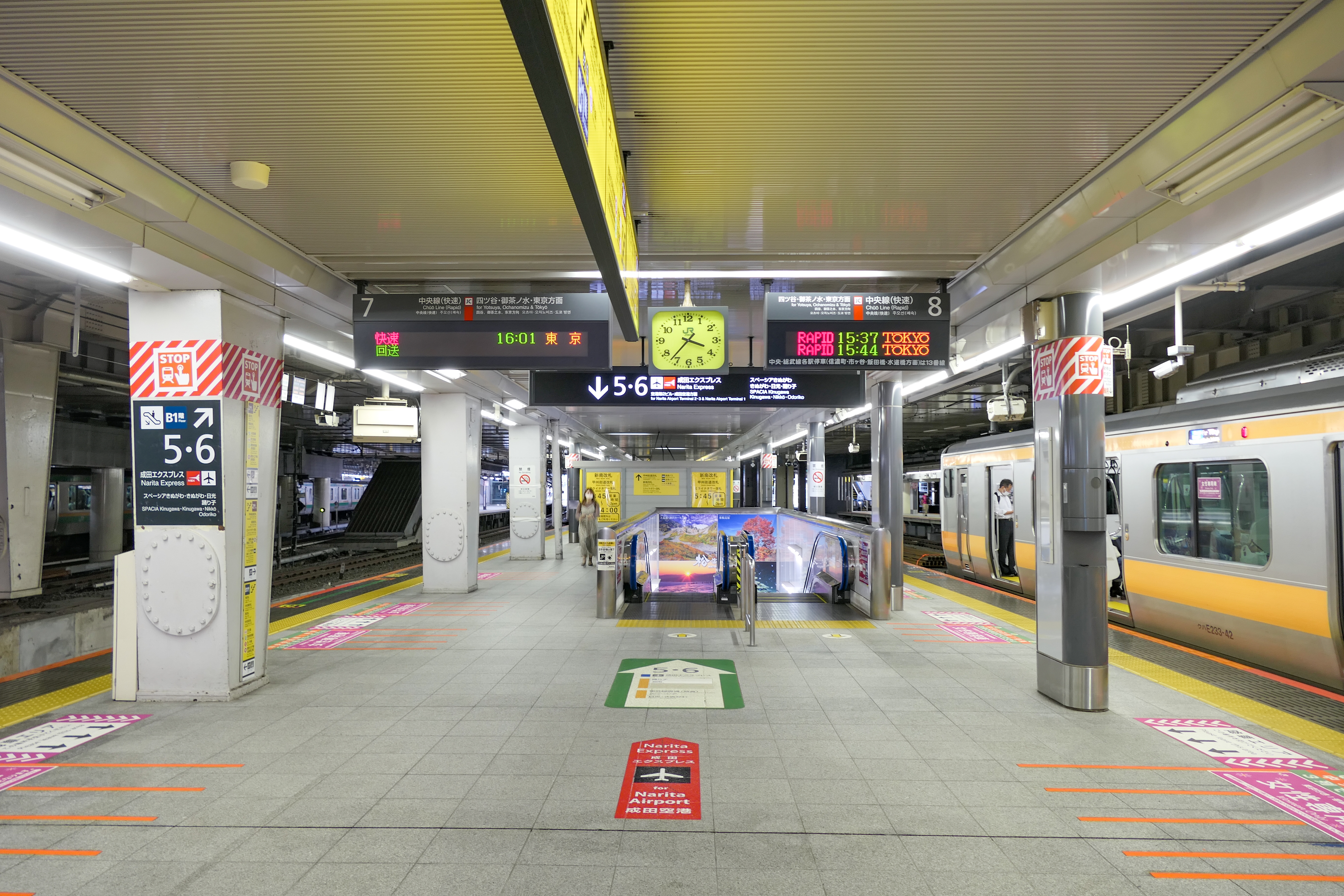
JR East platforms 7 and 8

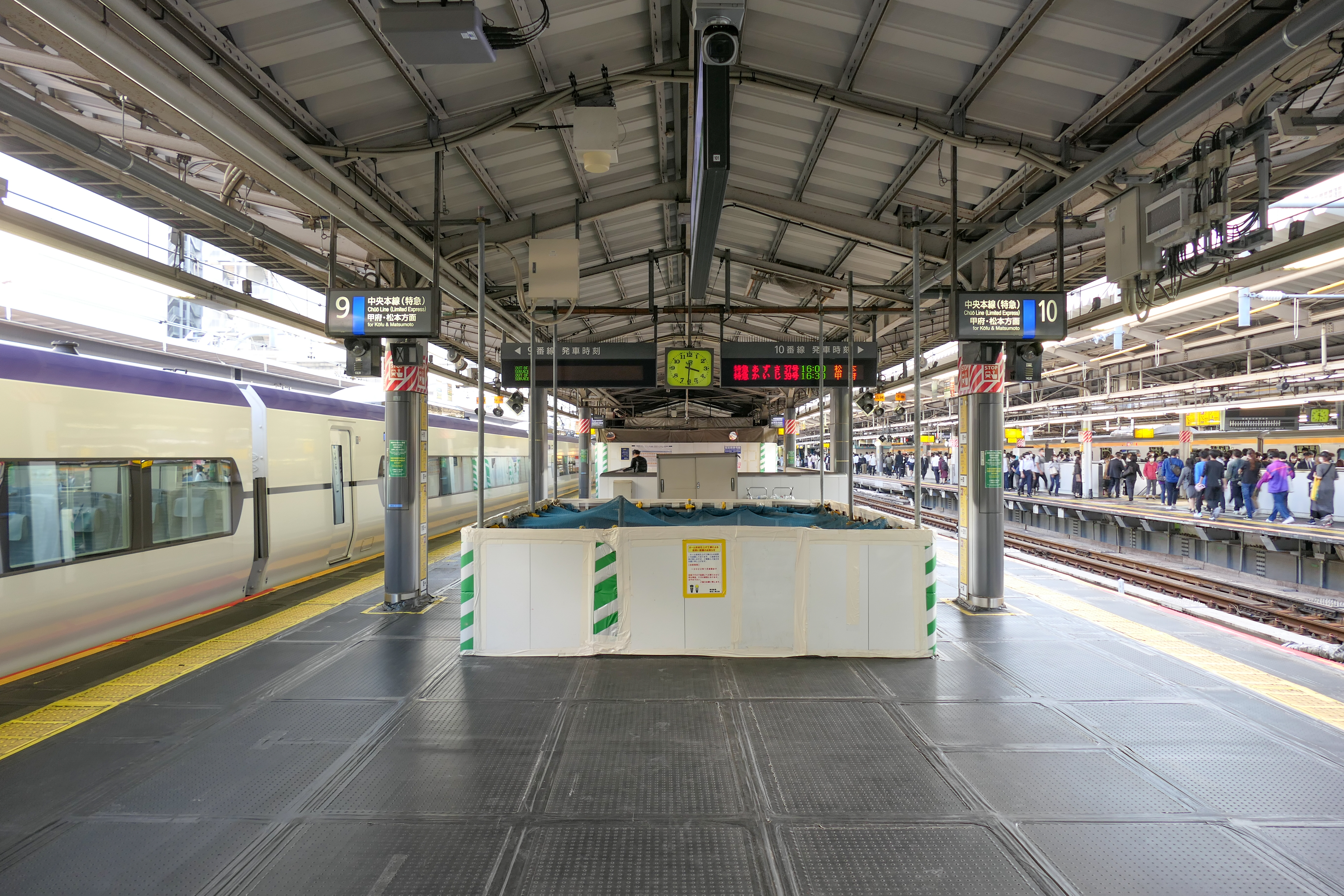
JR East platforms 9 and 10

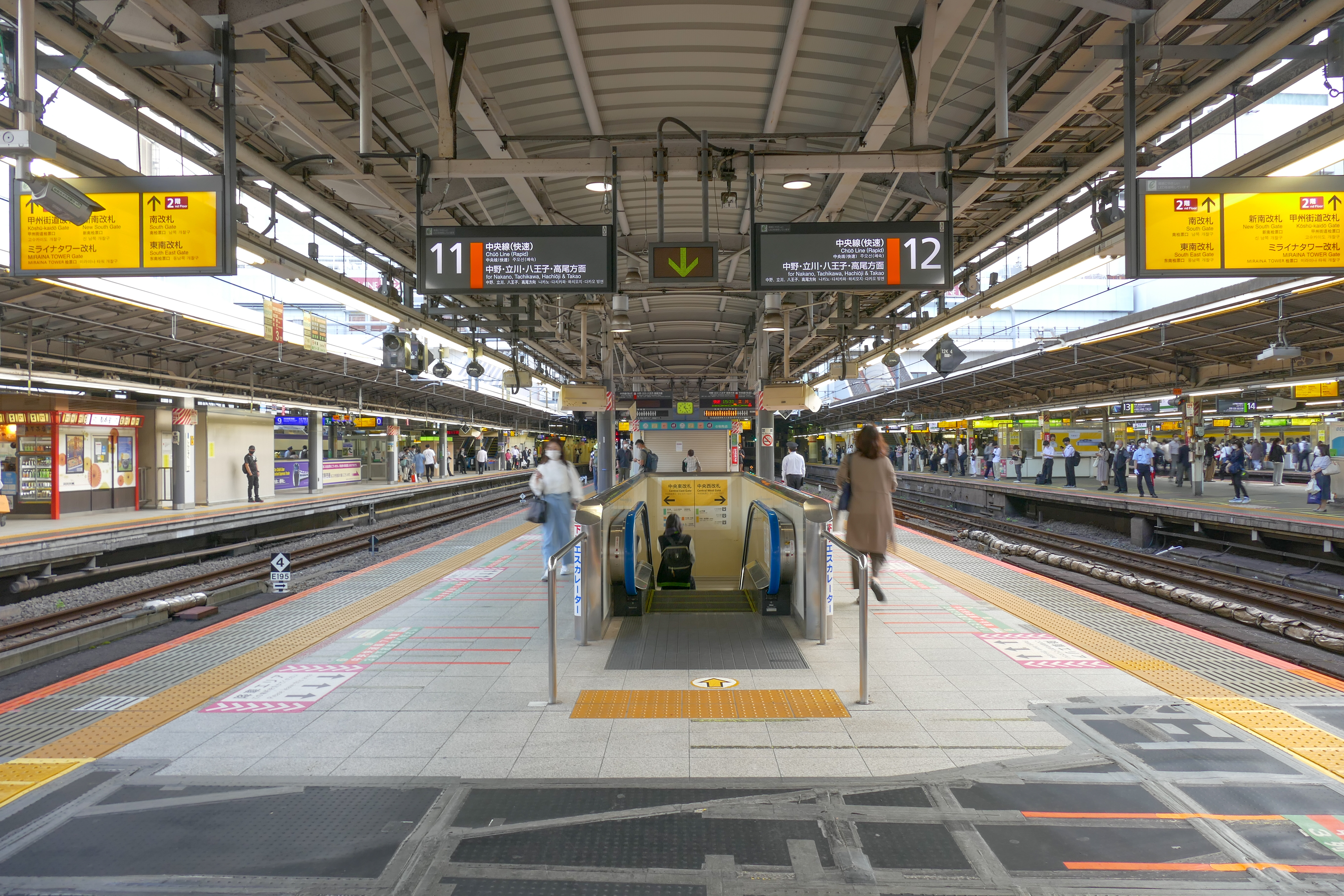
JR East platforms 11 and 12

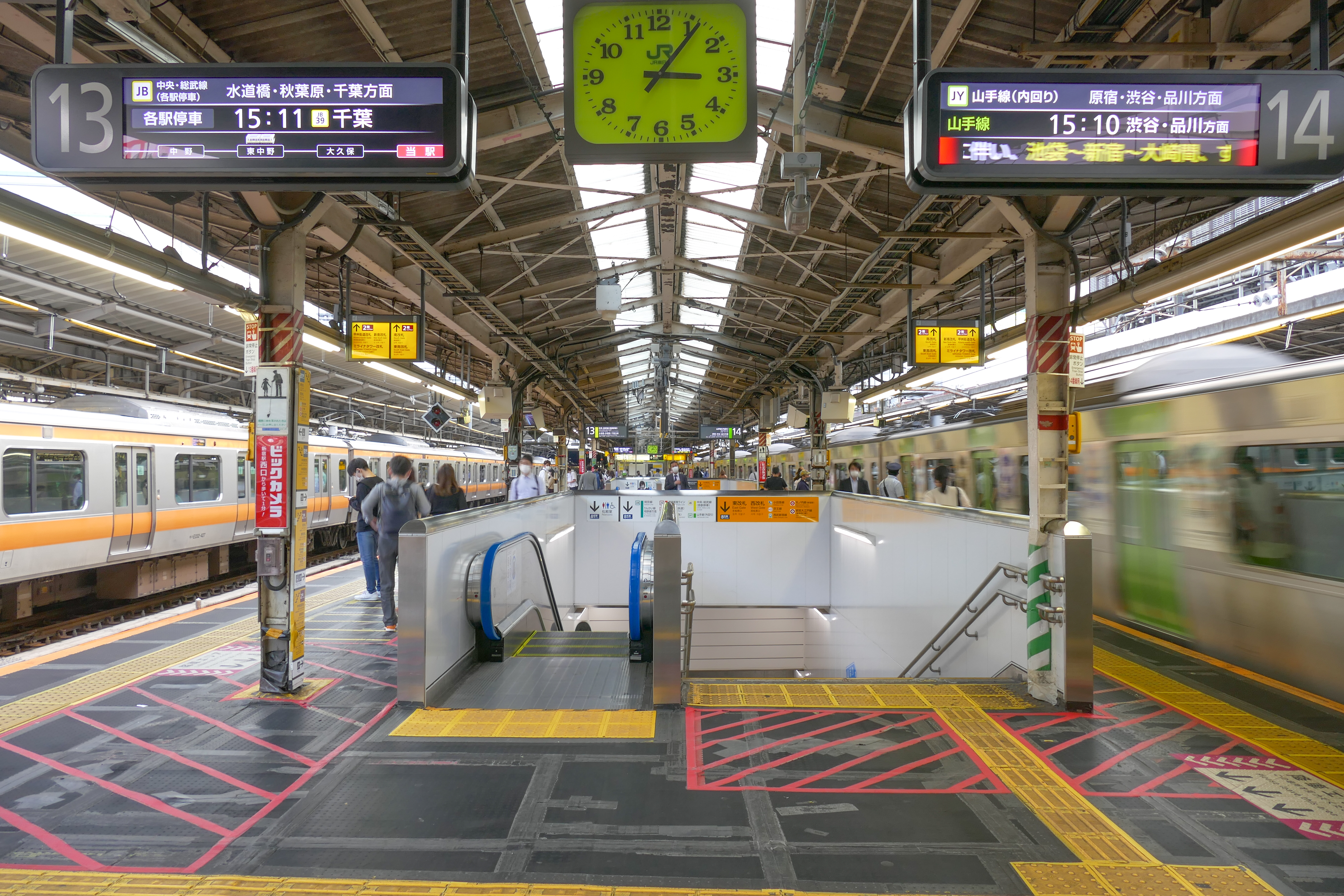
JR East platforms 13 and 14

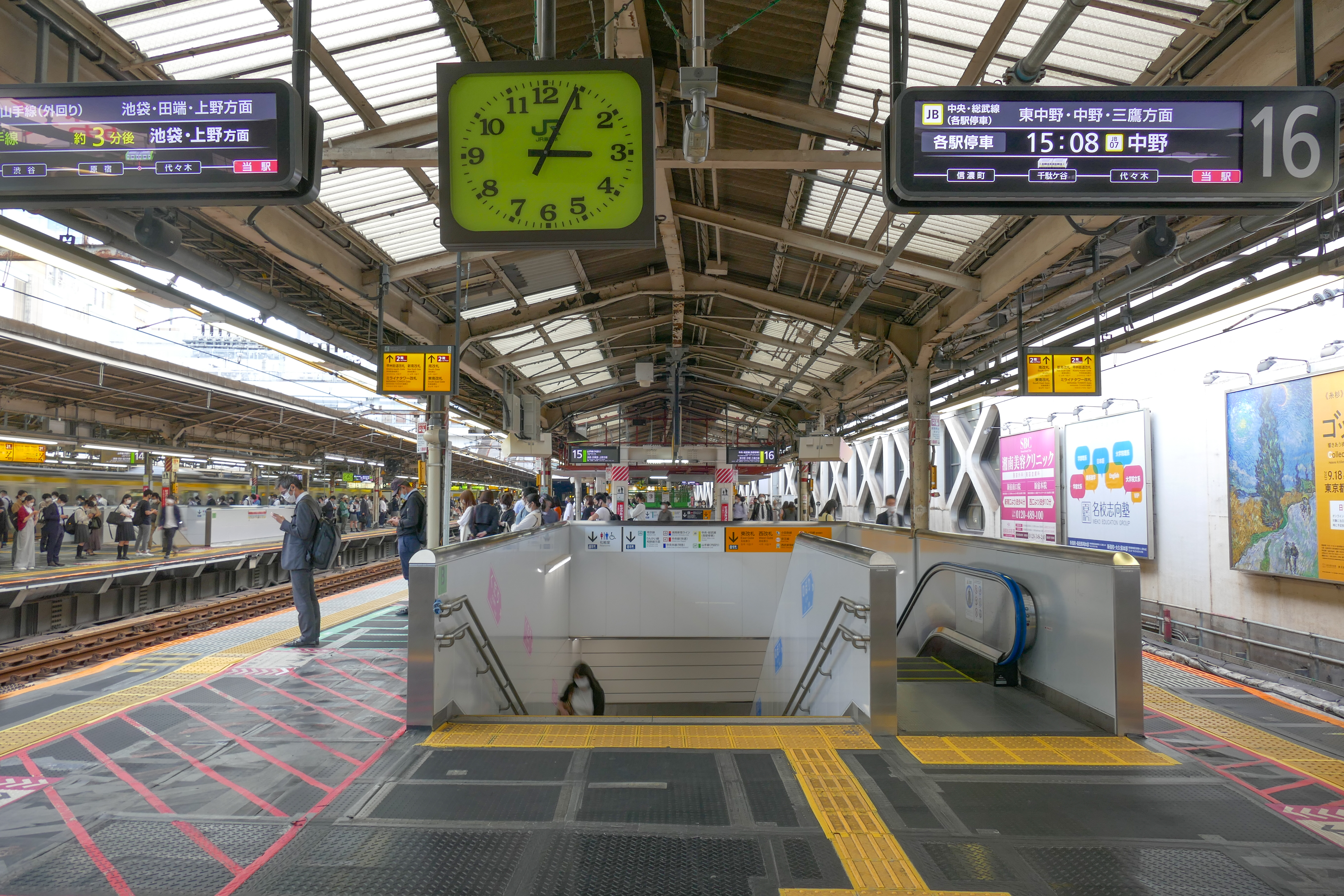
JR East platforms 15 and 16

Station layout

=== Odakyu ===
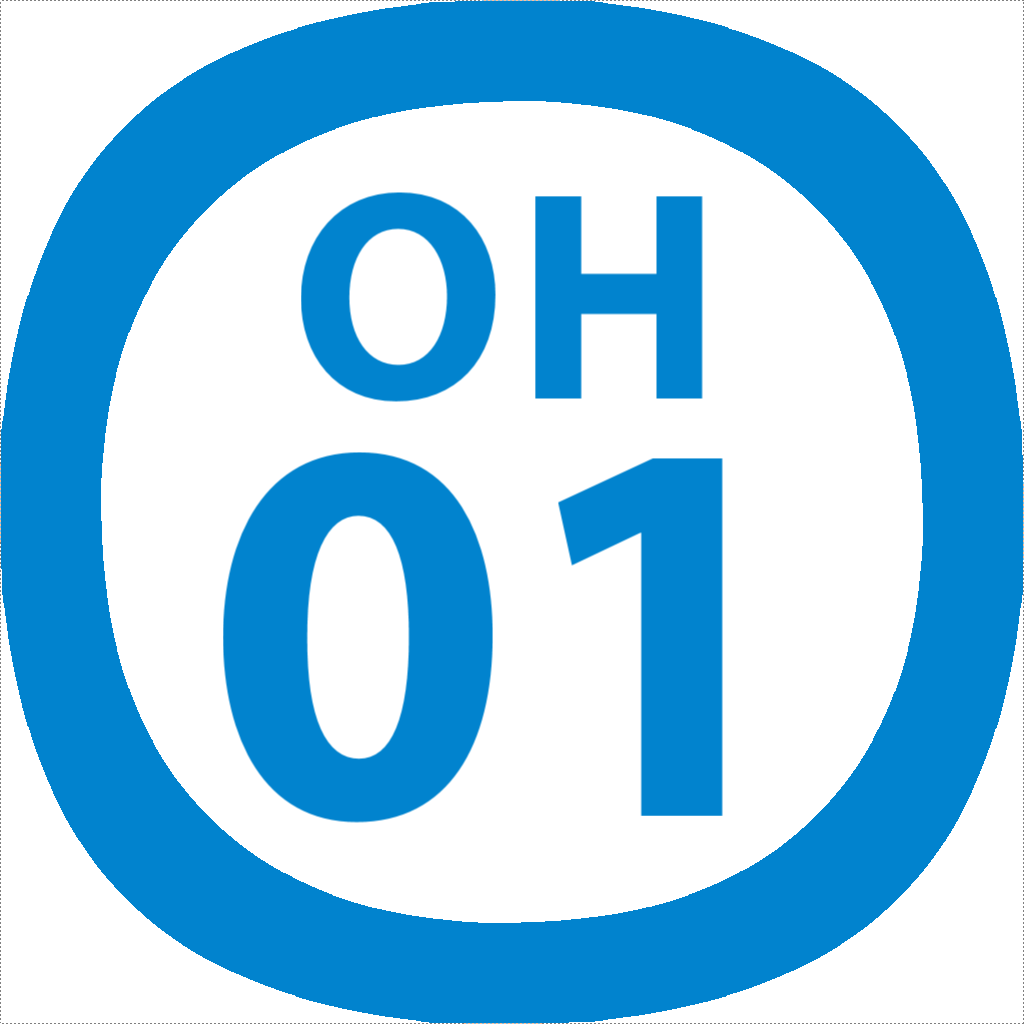
Shinjuku Station 新宿駅

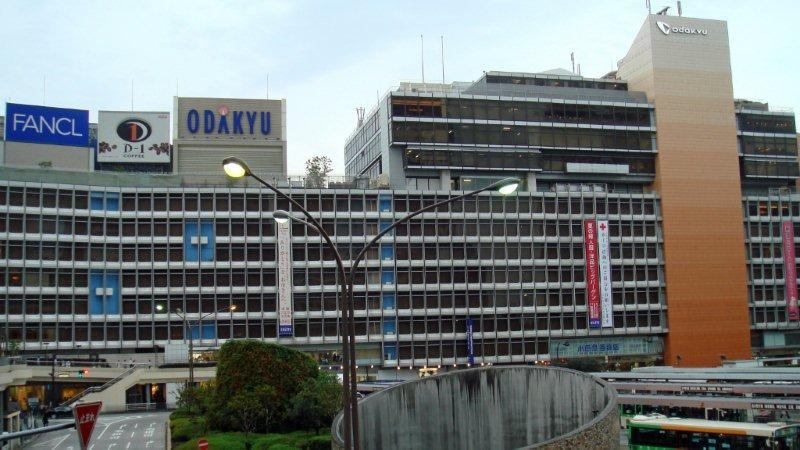
- West exit of Odakyu Shinjuku Station

General information
- Location: 1-1-3 Nishishinjuku, Shinjuku, Tokyo; Japan
- System: Odakyu station
- Operator: Odakyu Electric Railway
- Line: Odakyu Odawara Line

Construction
- Structure type: Ground level (platforms 1–6); Underground (platforms 7–10)
- Accessible: Yes (all levels)

Other information
- Station code: OH01

History
- Opened: 1927

Passengers
- FY2024: 450,952 daily

Services
Preceding station	Odakyu	Following station
Seijōgakuen-Mae towards Hakone-Yumoto, Gotemba or Katase-Enoshima	Romancecar	Terminus
Yoyogi-Uehara towards Odawara	Odawara Line Rapid Express	Terminus
Yoyogi-Uehara One-way operation	Odawara Line Commuter Express	Terminus
Yoyogi-Uehara towards Odawara	Odawara Line Express	Terminus
Minami-Shinjuku towards Hakone-Yumoto	Odawara Line Local	Terminus
Location

The terminus for the private Odakyu Odawara Line is parallel to the JR platforms on the west side and handles an average of 450,000 passengers daily. This is a major commuter route stretching southwest through the suburbs and out towards the coastal city of Odawara and the mountains of Hakone. The ten platforms are built on two levels beneath the Odakyu department store; three express service tracks (six platforms) on the ground level and two tracks (four platforms) on the level below. Each track has platforms on both sides in order to completely separate boarding and alighting passengers.

Chest-high platform screen doors were added to platforms 4 and 5 in September 2012.

==== Ground level ====
1	■	Not in use
2, 3	■ Ltd. Express. "Romancecar"	for Odawara, Hakone-Yumoto, Fujisawa, and Gotemba
4, 5	■ Rapid Express	for Shin-Yurigaoka, Machida, Ebina, Hon-Atsugi, Shin-Matsuda, Odawara, Chūō-Rinkan, Yamato, Shōnandai and Fujisawa
4, 5	■ Express	for Noborito, Shin-Yurigaoka, Machida, Ebina, Hon-Atsugi, Shin-Matsuda, Odawara, Chūō-Rinkan, Yamato, Shōnandai, Fujisawa and Katase-Enoshima
6	■	(Alighting only)

==== Underground level ====
7	■	(Alighting only)
8, 9	■ Local	for Shin-Yurigaoka, Sagami-Ono, and Hon-Atsugi
10	■	(Alighting only)

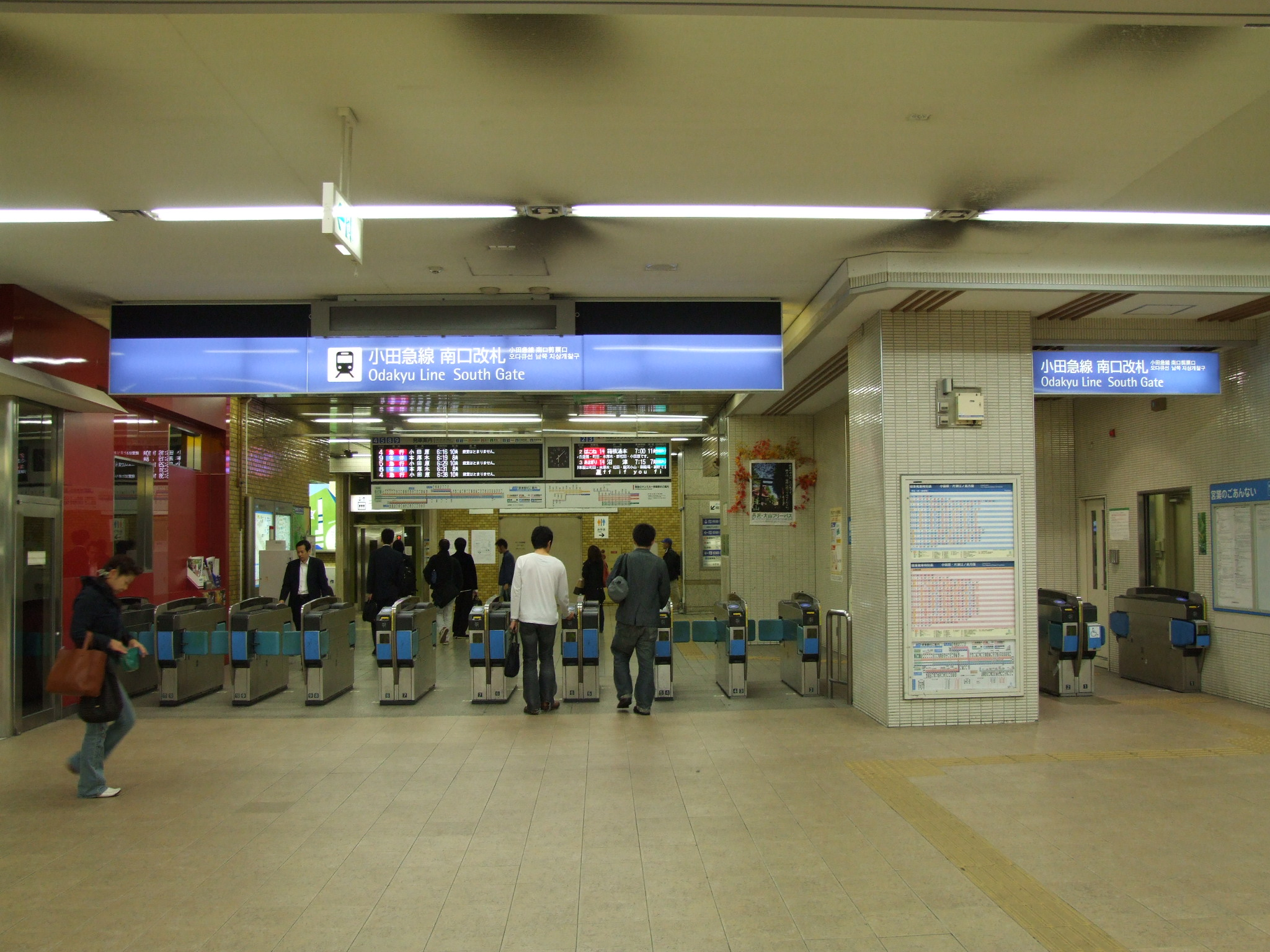
South gate

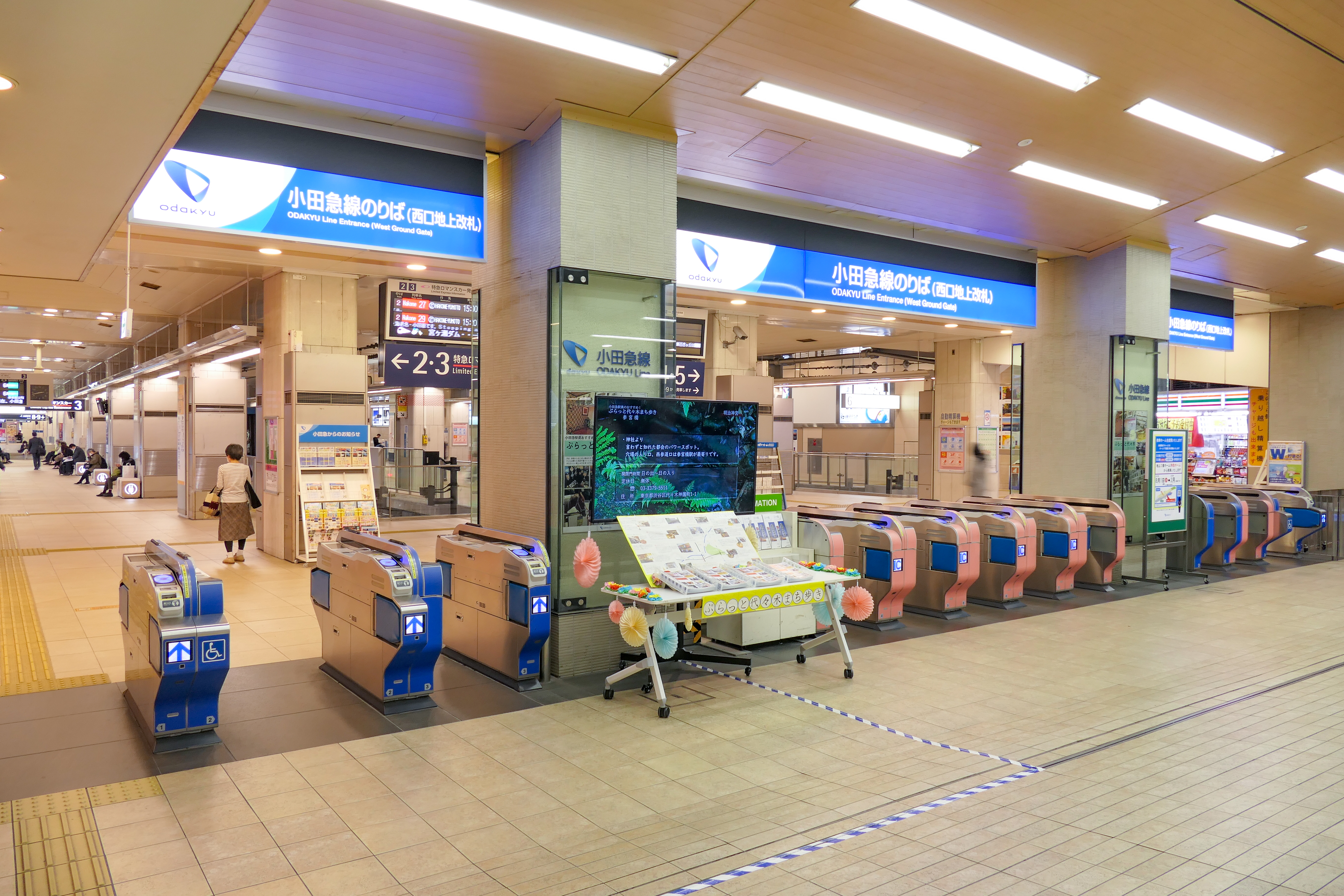
West gate

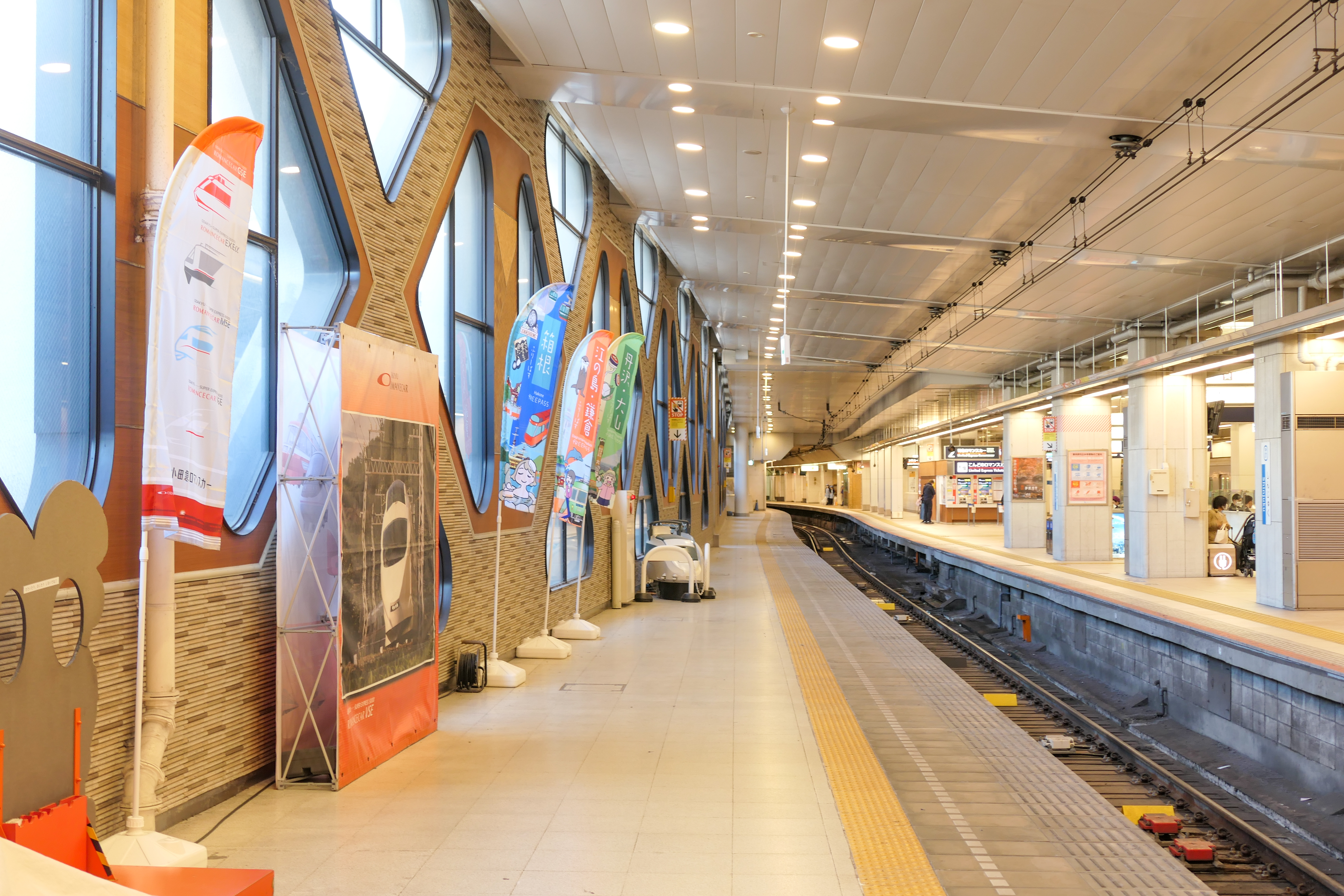
Ground level platform 1

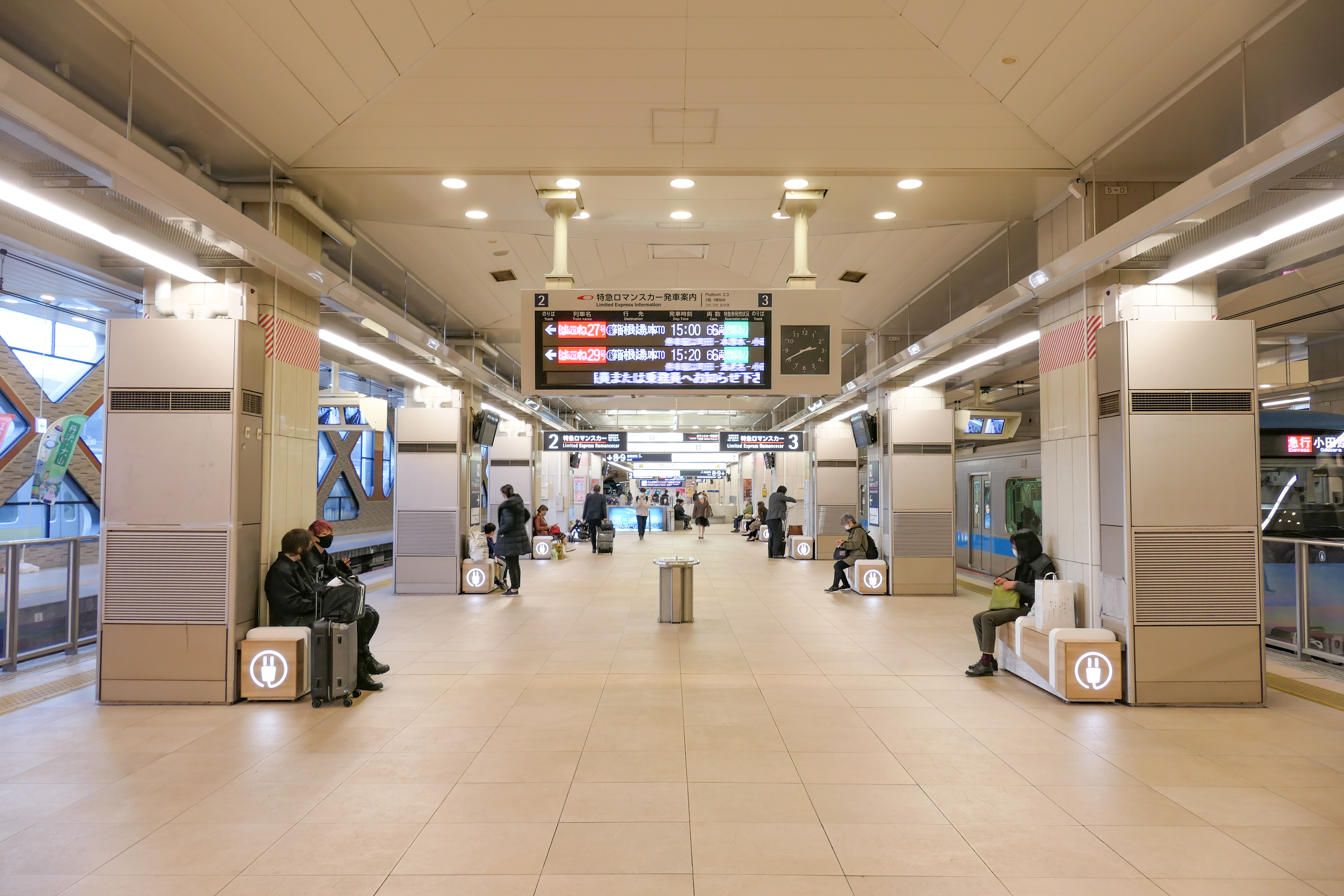
Ground level platforms 2 and 3

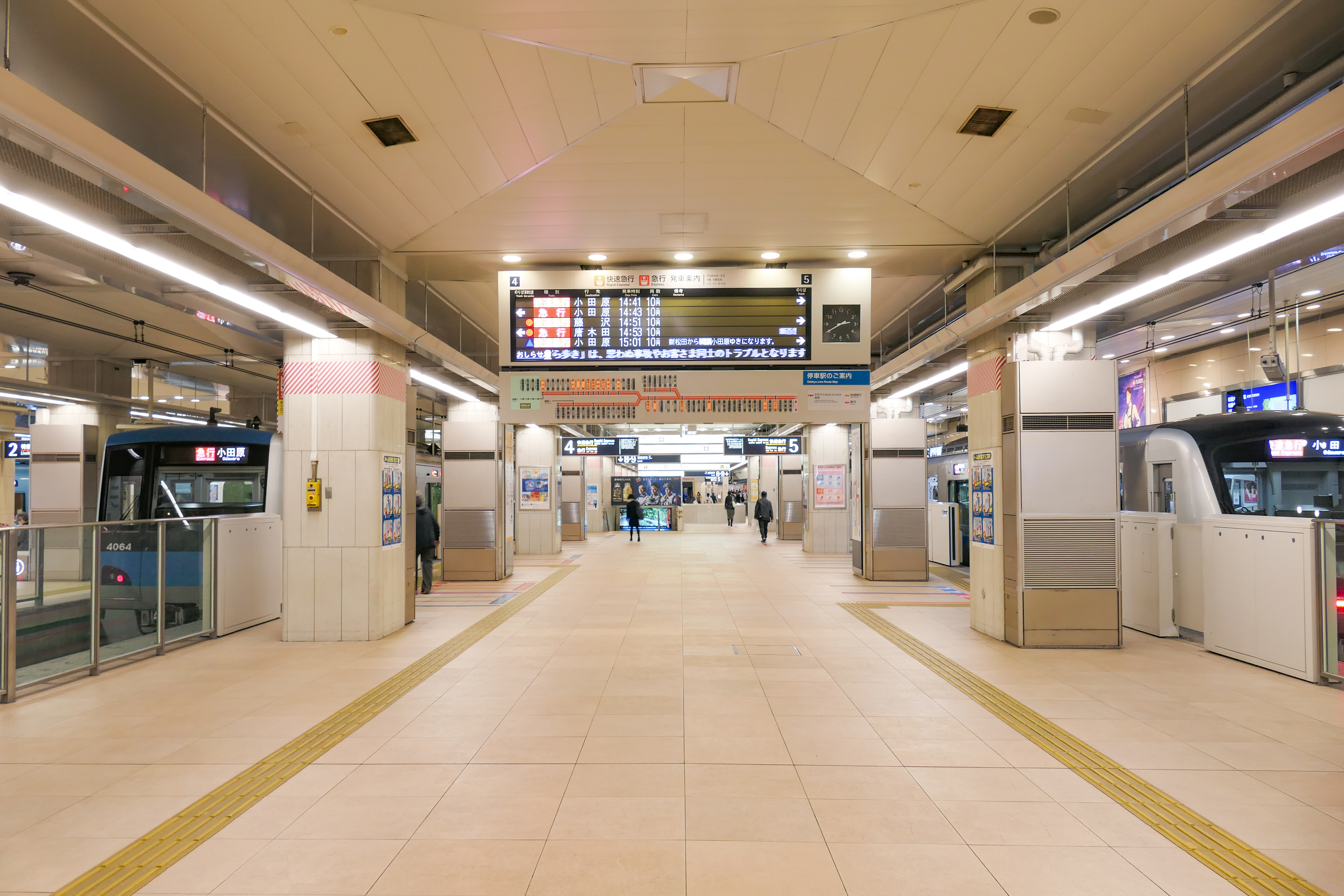
Ground level platforms 4 and 5

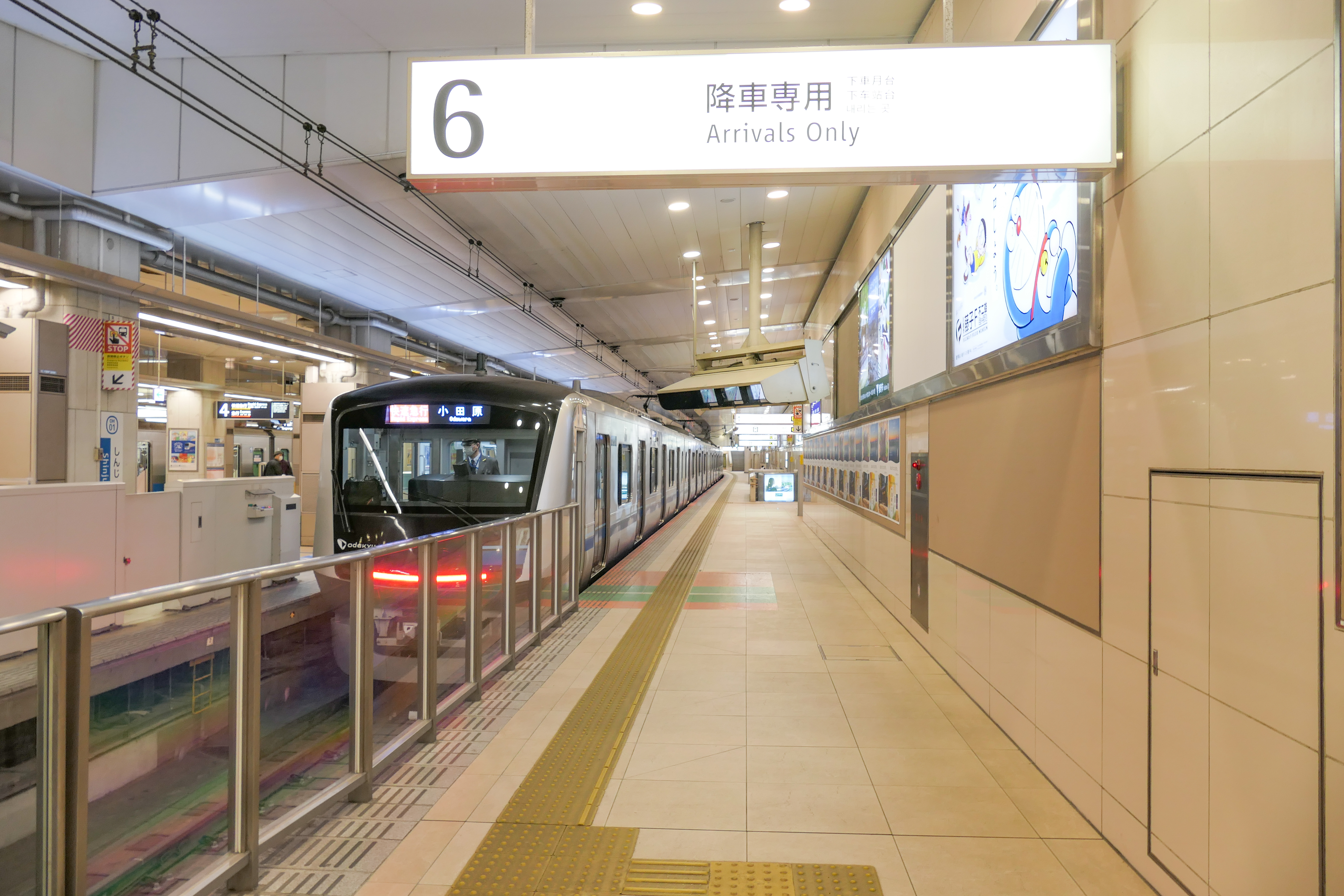
Ground level platform 6

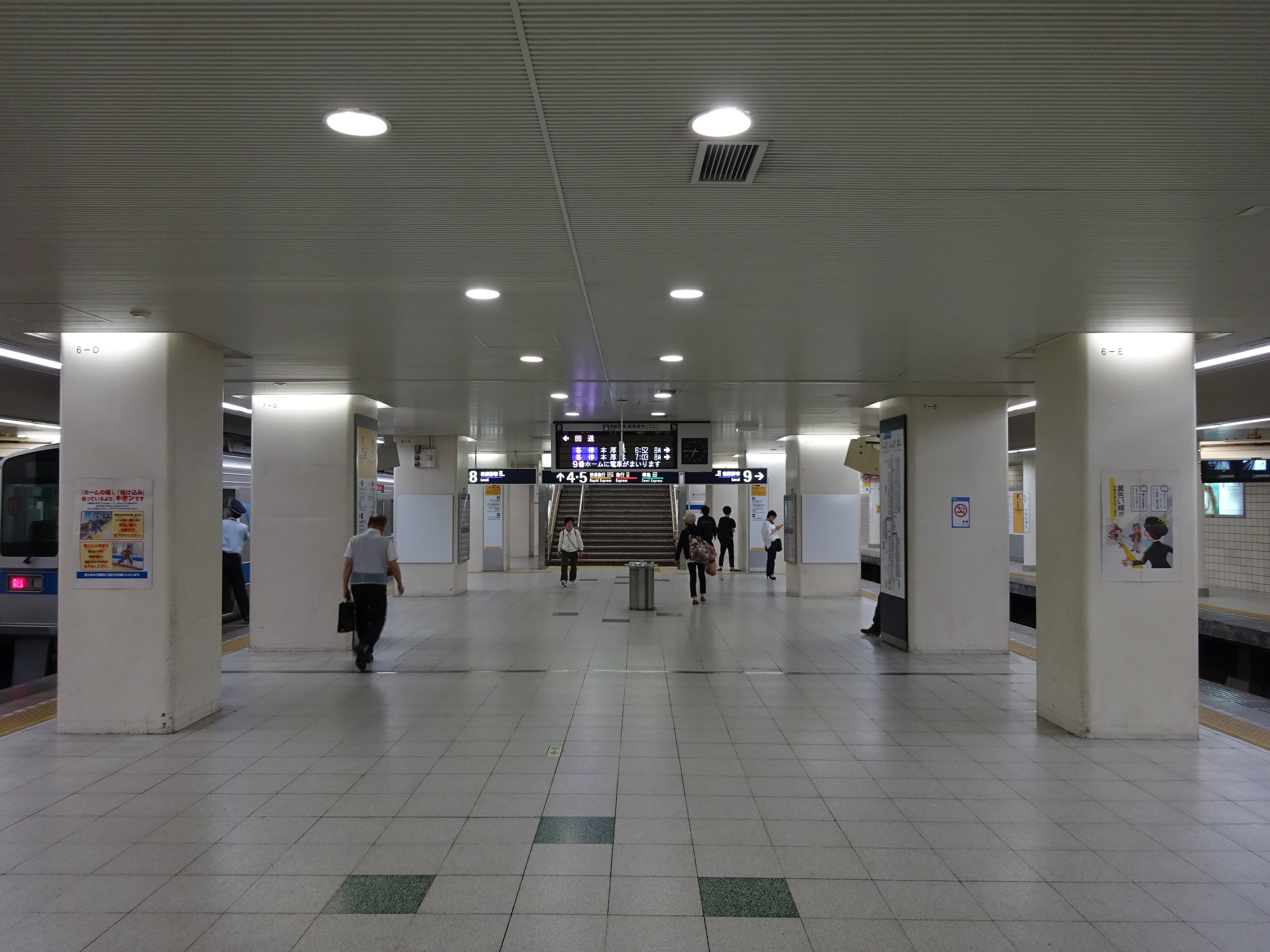
Underground platforms

=== Keio/Toei Subway (Toei Shinjuku Line) ===
Shinjuku Station 新宿駅

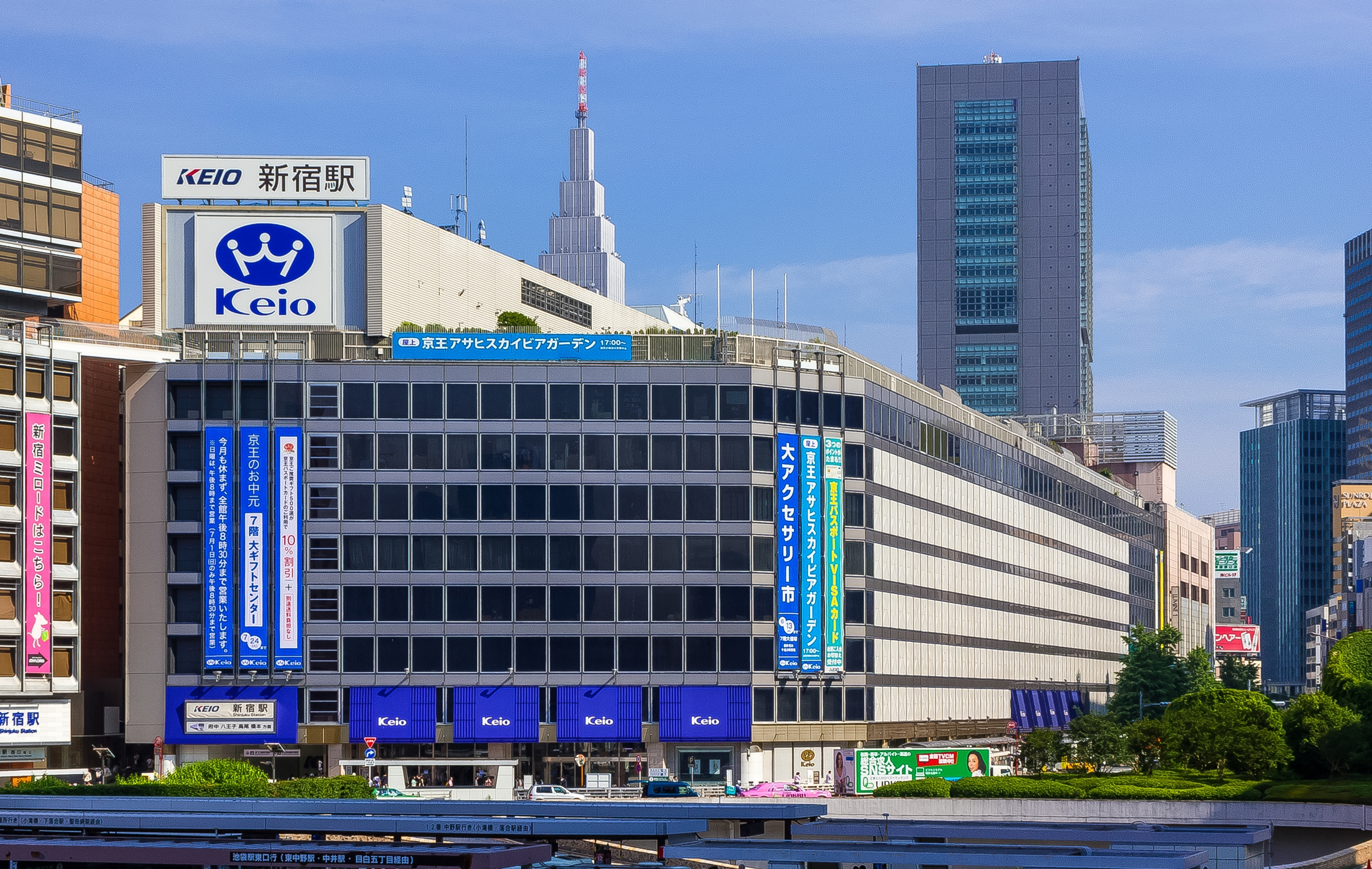
- West exit of Keio Shinjuku Station

General information
- Location: 1-1-4 Nishi-Shinjuku, Shinjuku City, Tokyo; Japan
- System: Keio/Toei Subway station
- Operator: Keio Corporation; Toei Subway
- Lines: Keiō Line; Keiō New Line; Toei Shinjuku Line
- Platforms: 3 bay platforms
- Tracks: 3

Construction
- Structure type: Underground
- Accessible: Yes

Other information
- Station code: KO-01

History
- Opened: 1915
- Rebuilt: 1978

Passengers
- FY2024: 728,874 daily (includes Oedo Line)

Services
Preceding station	Keio Corporation	Following station
Meidaimae towards Keiō-hachiōji	Keiō Liner	Terminus
Meidaimae towards Hashimoto	Keiō Liner	Terminus
Sasazuka towards Keiō-hachiōji	Keiō Line Special Express	Terminus
Sasazuka towards Keiō-hachiōji	Keiō Line Express Semi Express Rapid Local	Terminus
Hatsudai towards Sasazuka	Keiō New Line Express Semi Express Rapid Local	through to Shinjuku Line
Preceding station	Toei Subway	Following station
through to Keiō New Line	Shinjuku Line Express	Ichigaya towards Motoyawata
through to Keiō New Line	Shinjuku Line Local	Shinjuku-sanchome towards Motoyawata
Track layout
Location

Keio operates two sections of Shinjuku Station, the traditional Keio Line stub terminal and a separate through station connecting the Keio New Line with the Toei Shinjuku Line. In 2019, 788,567 passengers used the Keio complex daily (Keio and Keio New Lines), which makes it among the busiest among the non-JR Group railways of Japan.

==== Keio Line ====
The Keio Line concourse is located to the west of the Odakyu line concourse, two floors below ground level under the Keio department store. It consists of three platforms stretching north to south. An additional thin platform between Platforms 2 and 3 is used for alighting only. This suburban commuter line links Shinjuku to the city of Hachiōji to the west. Chest-high platform edge doors were introduced on the Keio Line platforms in March 2014. The doors are different colours for each platform; the doors on Platform 2 are green.

1	Keiō Line (Keiō Liner<Weekdays>, Special Express, Express, Semi Express, Rapid, Local)	for Meidaimae, Chōfu, Keiō Tama-Center, and Keiō-Hachiōji; Keiō Sagamihara Line for Hashimoto (via Chōfu); Keiō Takao Line for Takaosanguchi (via Kitano)
2	Keiō Line (Keiō Liner<Weekends / Holidays>, Mt.Takao, Special Express, Express, Semi Express, Rapid, Local)	(Same as Platform 1)
-	■	(Alighting only)
3	Keiō Line (Special Express, Express, Semi Express, Rapid)	(Same as Platform 1)

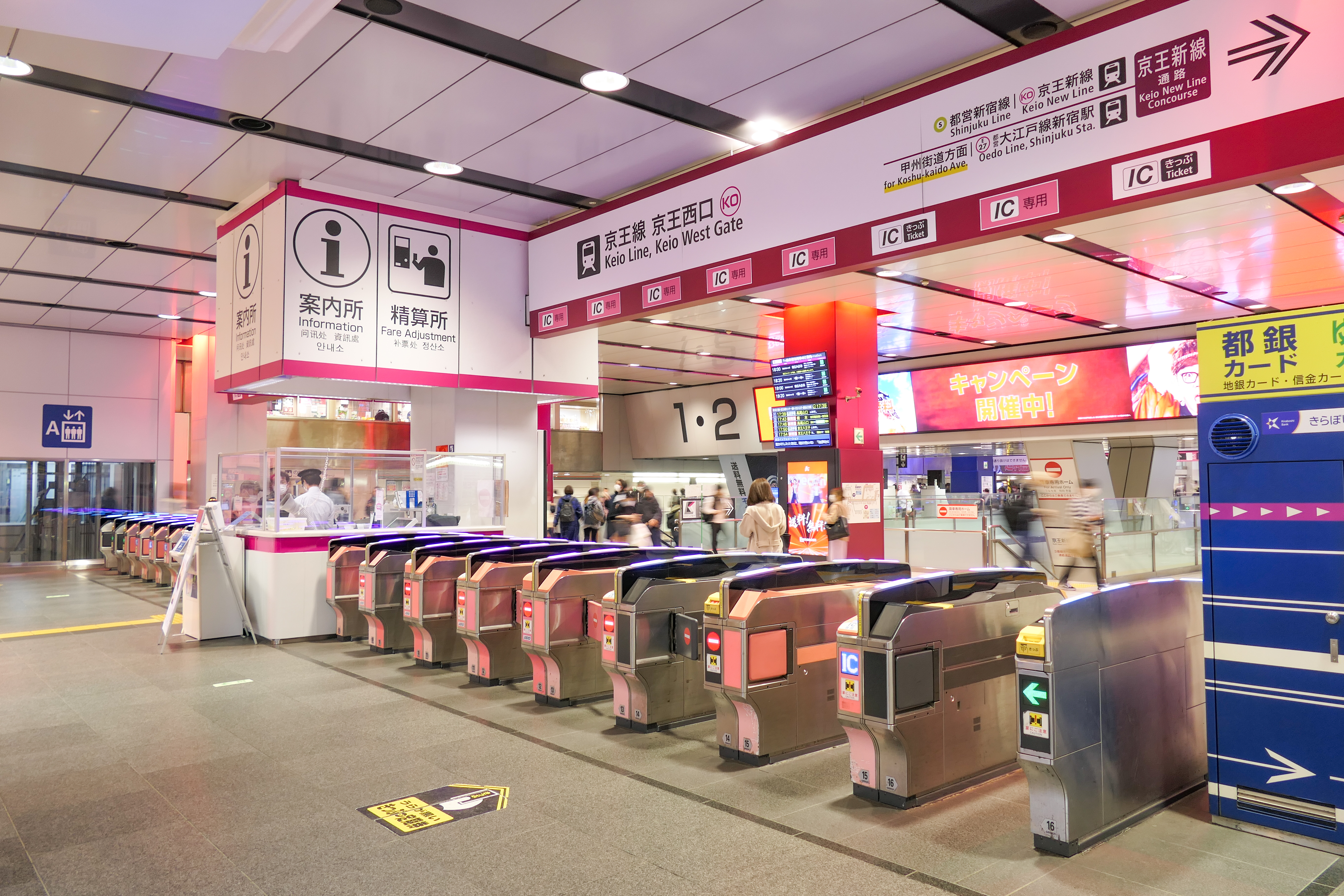
West gates

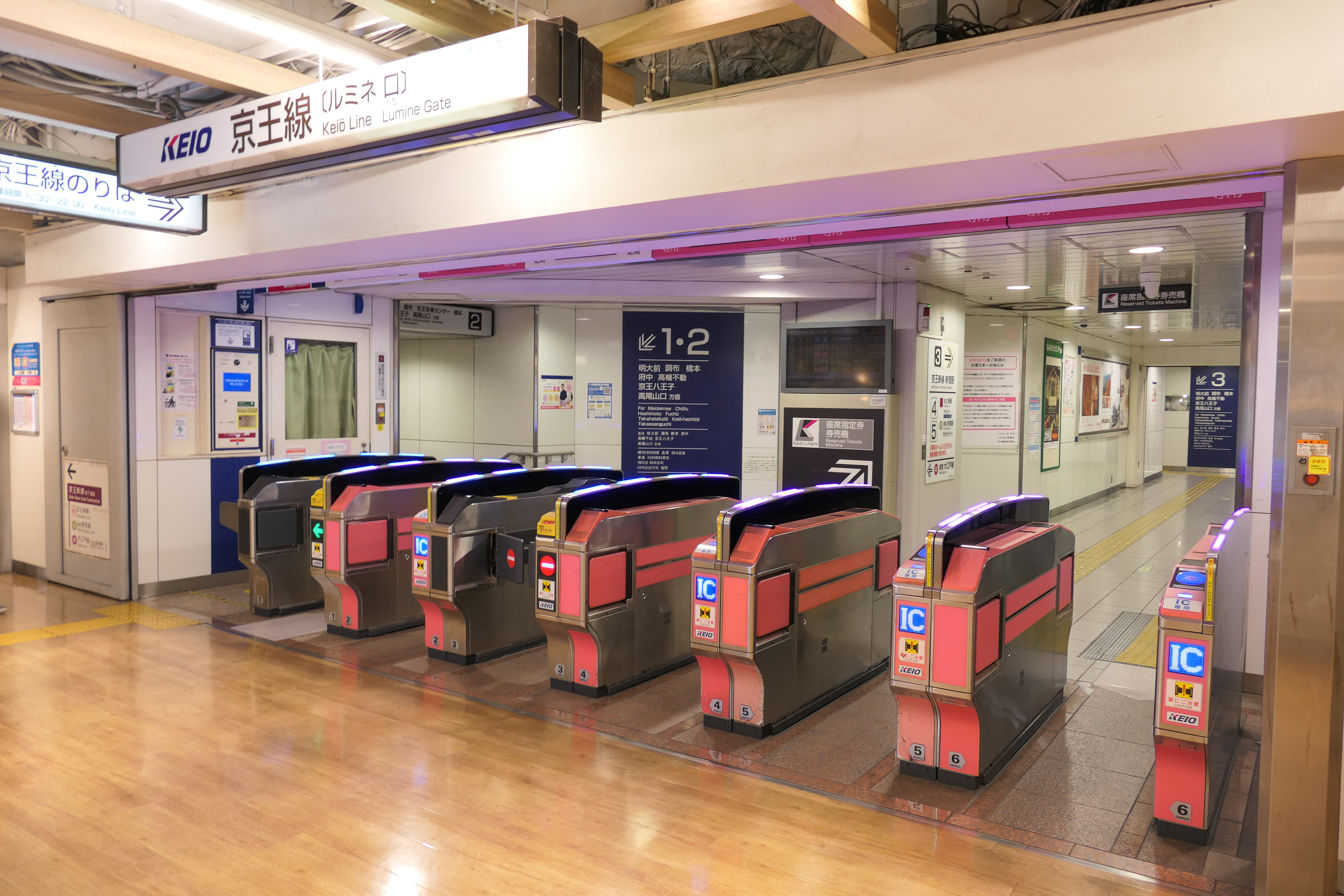
Lumine gates

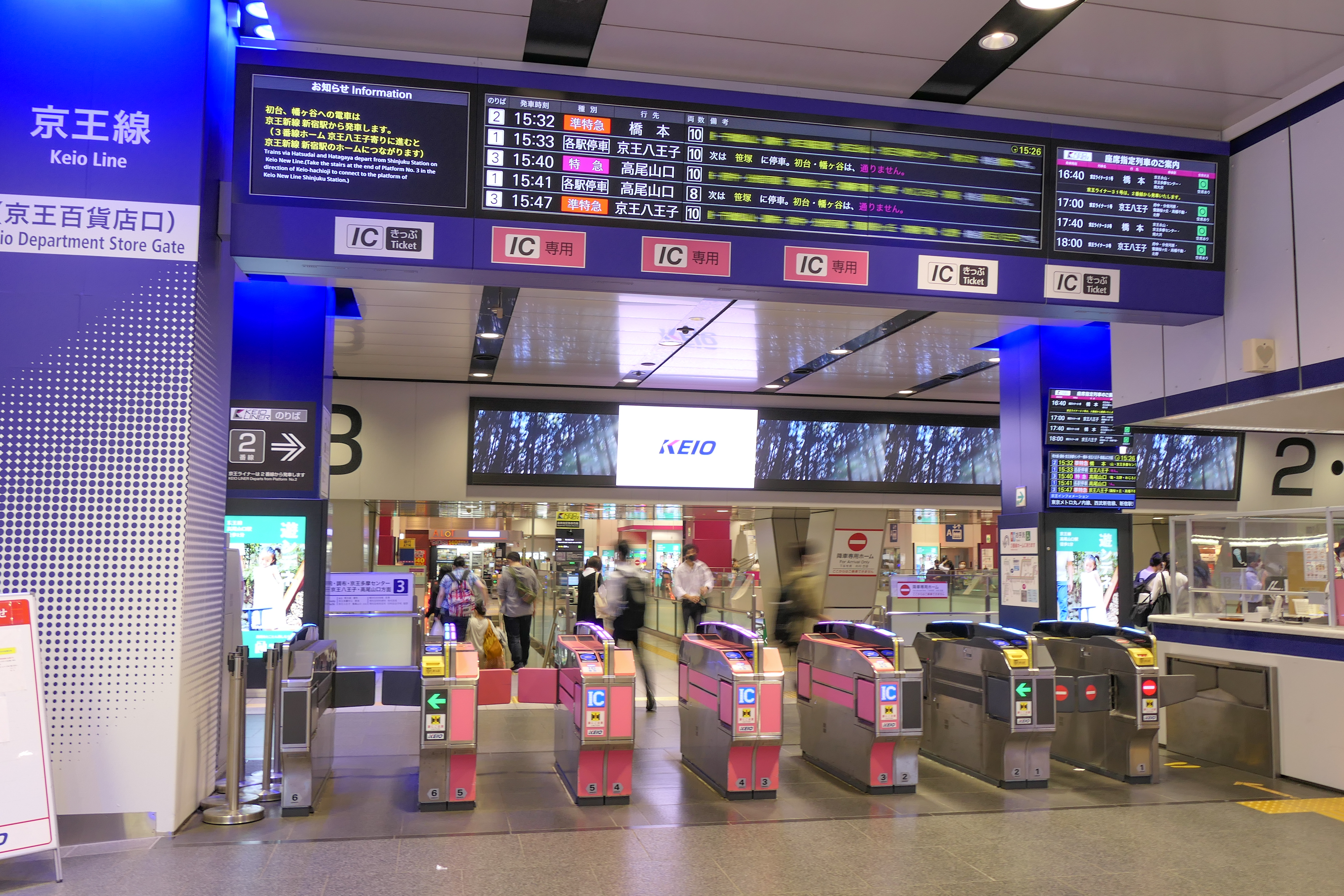
Keio Department Store gates

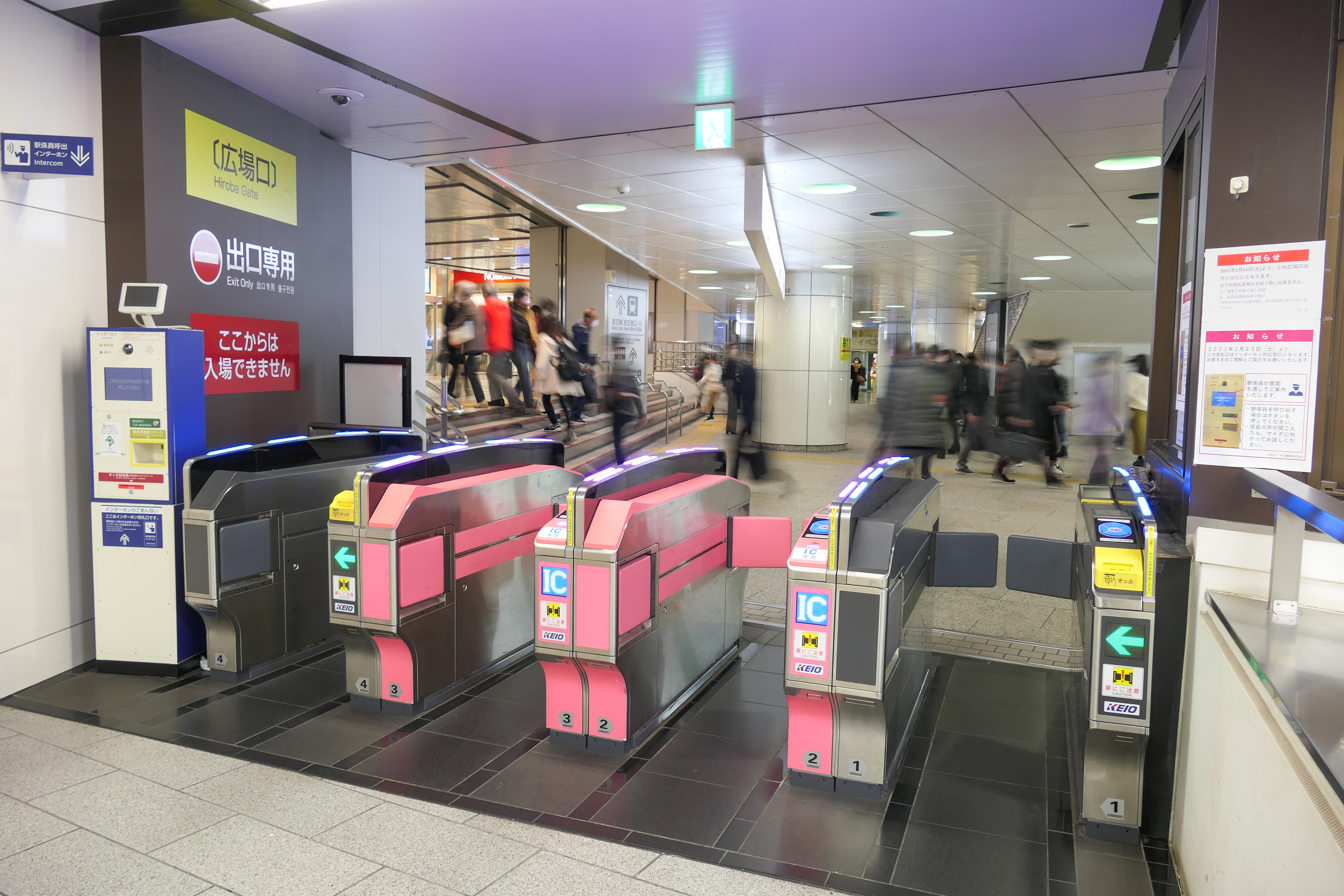
Hiroba gates (exit only)

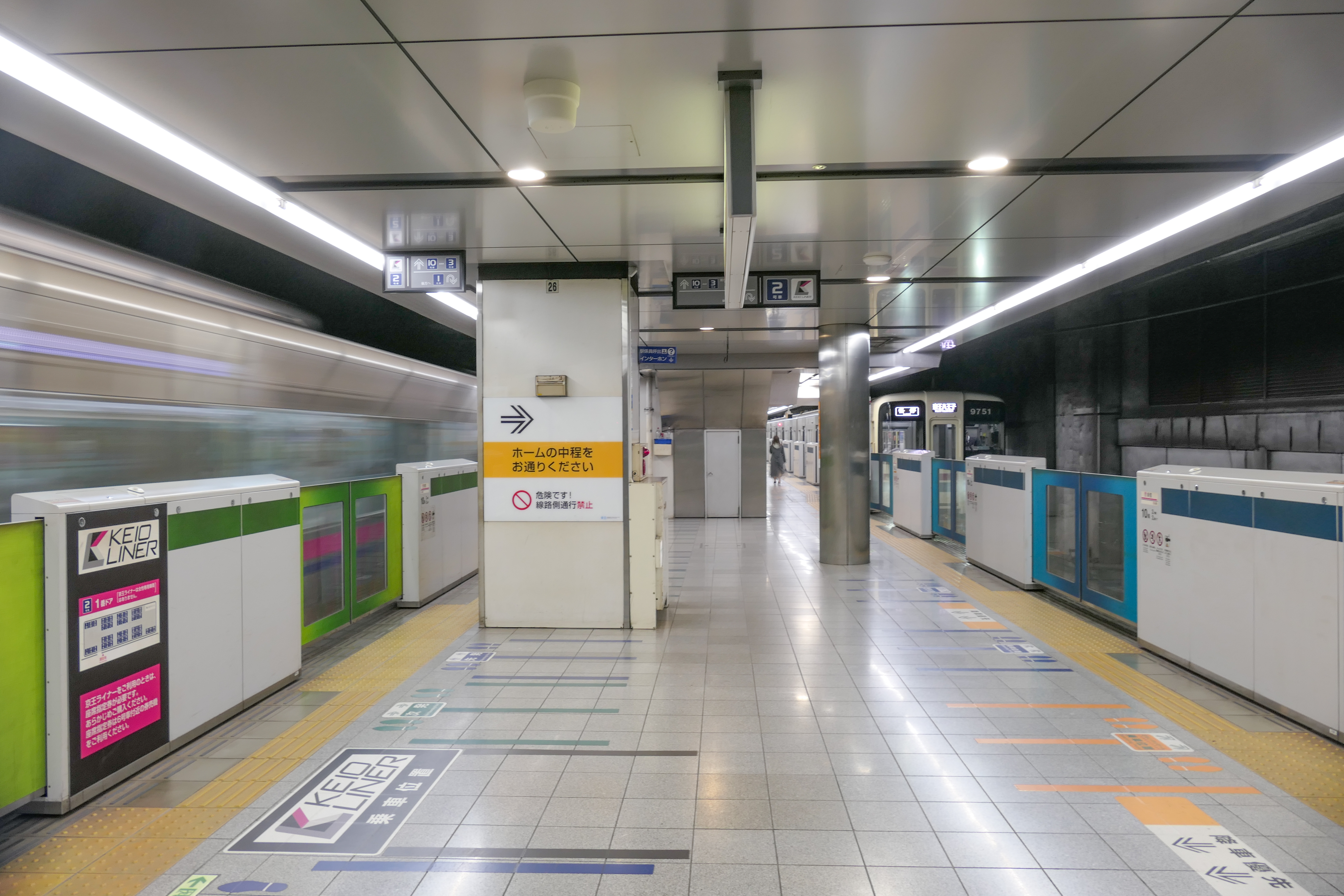
Platforms 1 and 2

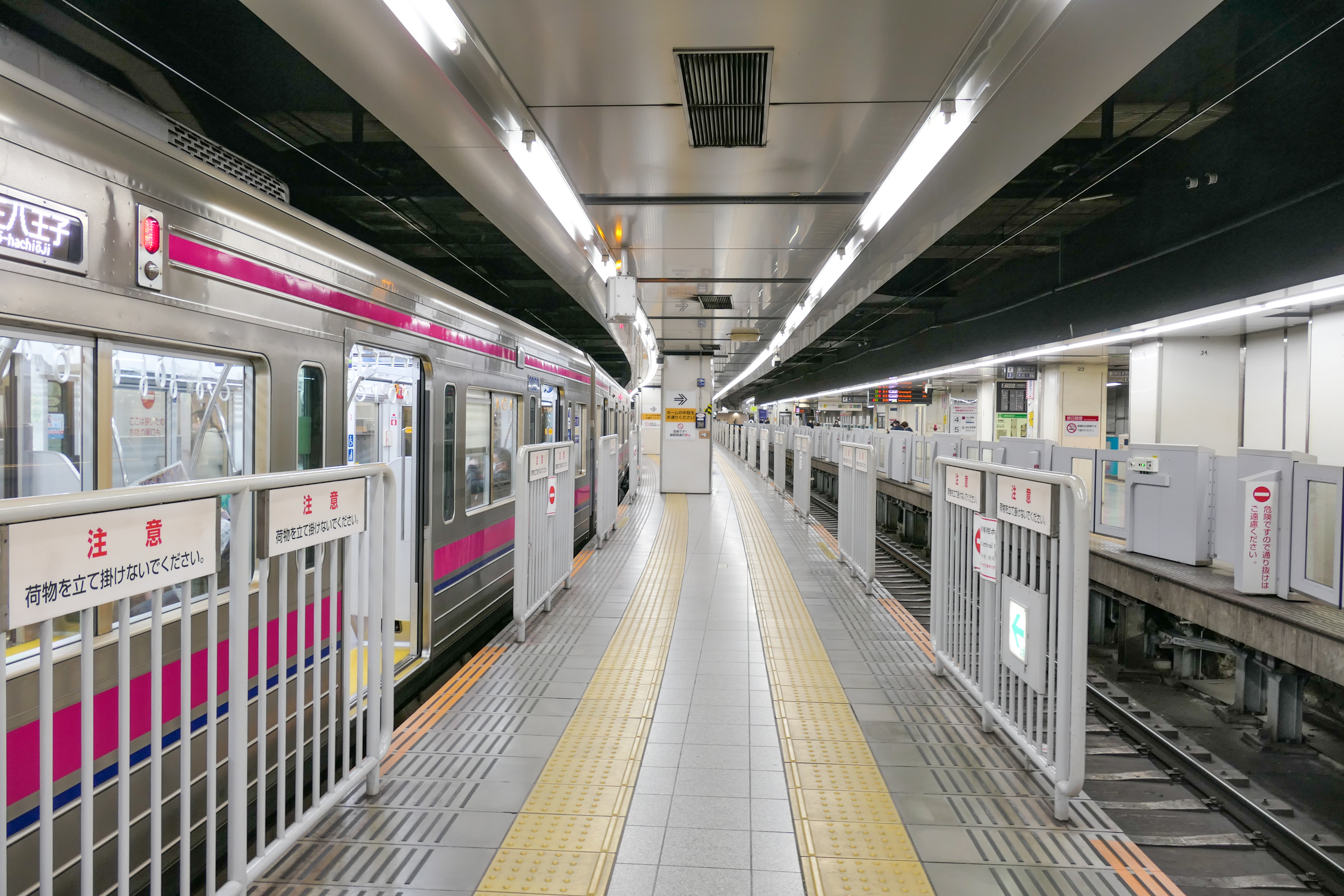
Platforms for getting off

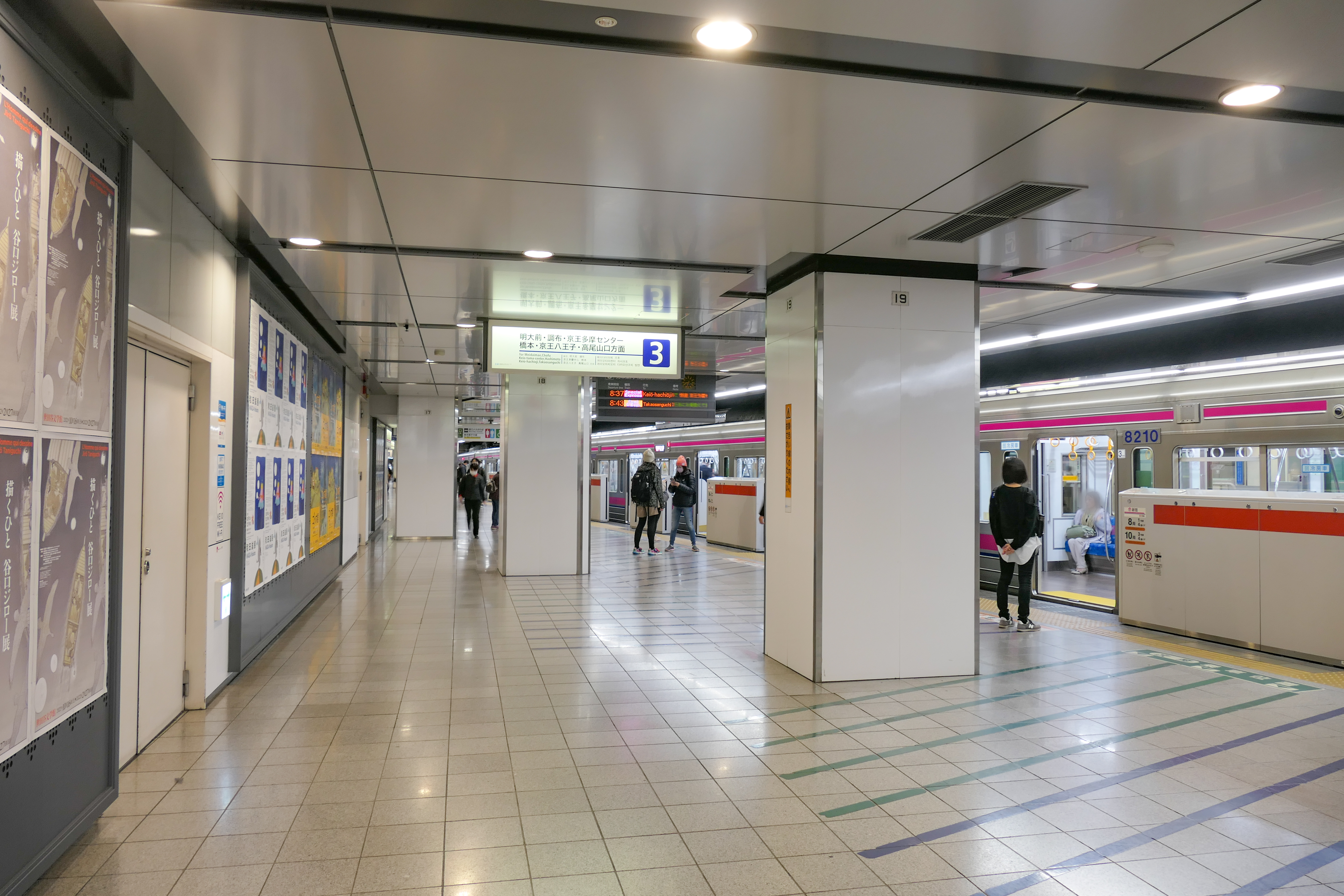
Platform 3

==== Keio New Line and Toei Shinjuku Line ====
The shared facilities for the Toei Shinjuku subway line and the Keiō New Line are distinctively called Keiō New Line Shinjuku Station (新線新宿駅, Shinsen Shinjuku-eki) and consist of two platforms stretching east–west five floors beneath the Kōshū Kaidō avenue to the southwest of the JR section. The concourse is managed by Keio Corporation but is in a separate location from the main Keio platforms. Further south (and deeper underground) are the two north-to-south Toei Ōedo subway line platforms.

4	Keio New Line	for Hatsudai, Hatagaya, Sasazuka, Meidaimae, Chōfu and Hashimoto
5	Toei Shinjuku Line	for Ichigaya, Kudanshita, Jimbocho, Ōjima, and Motoyawata

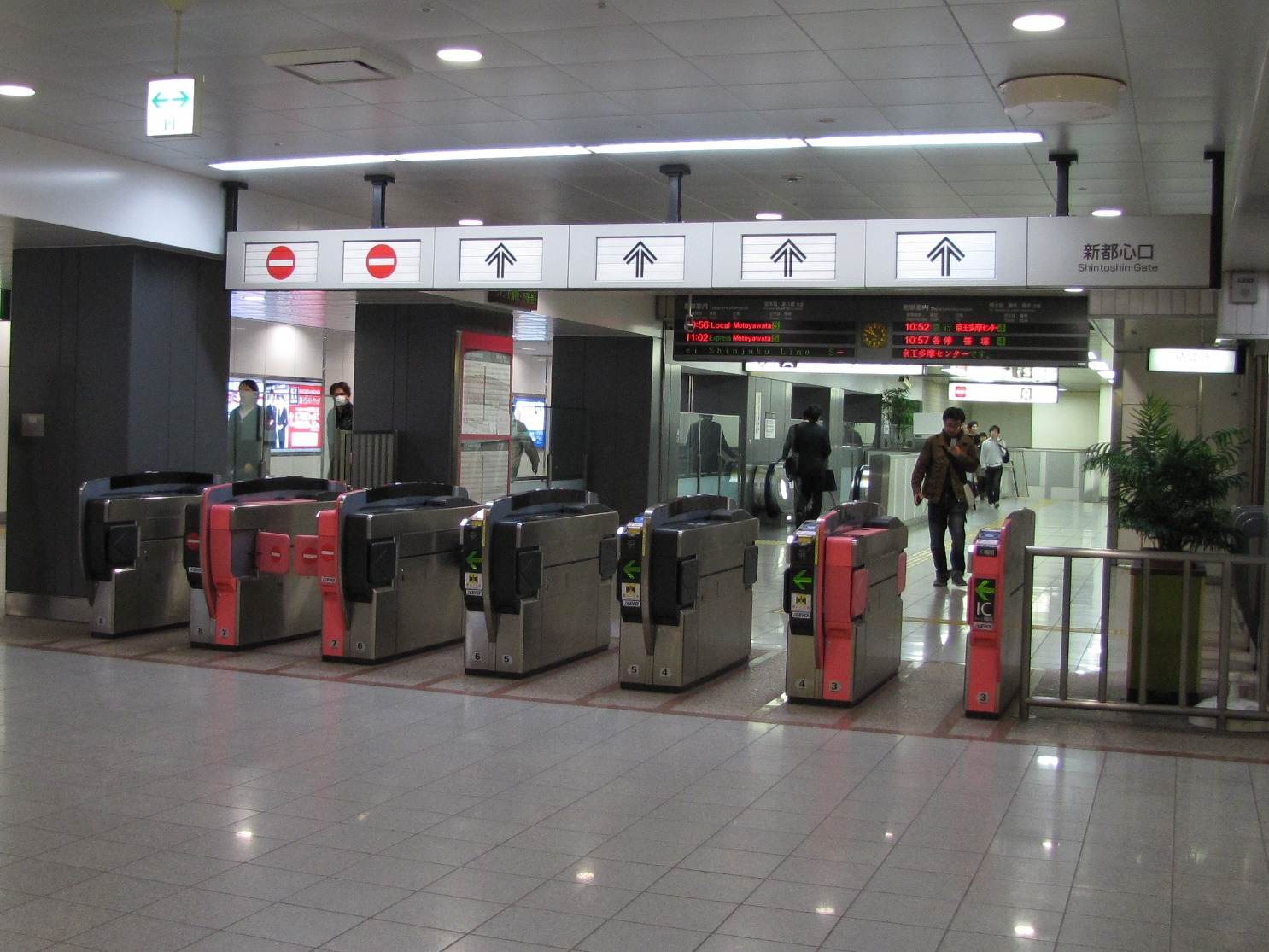
Ticket gates for Keio New Line and Toei Shinjuku Line, 2010

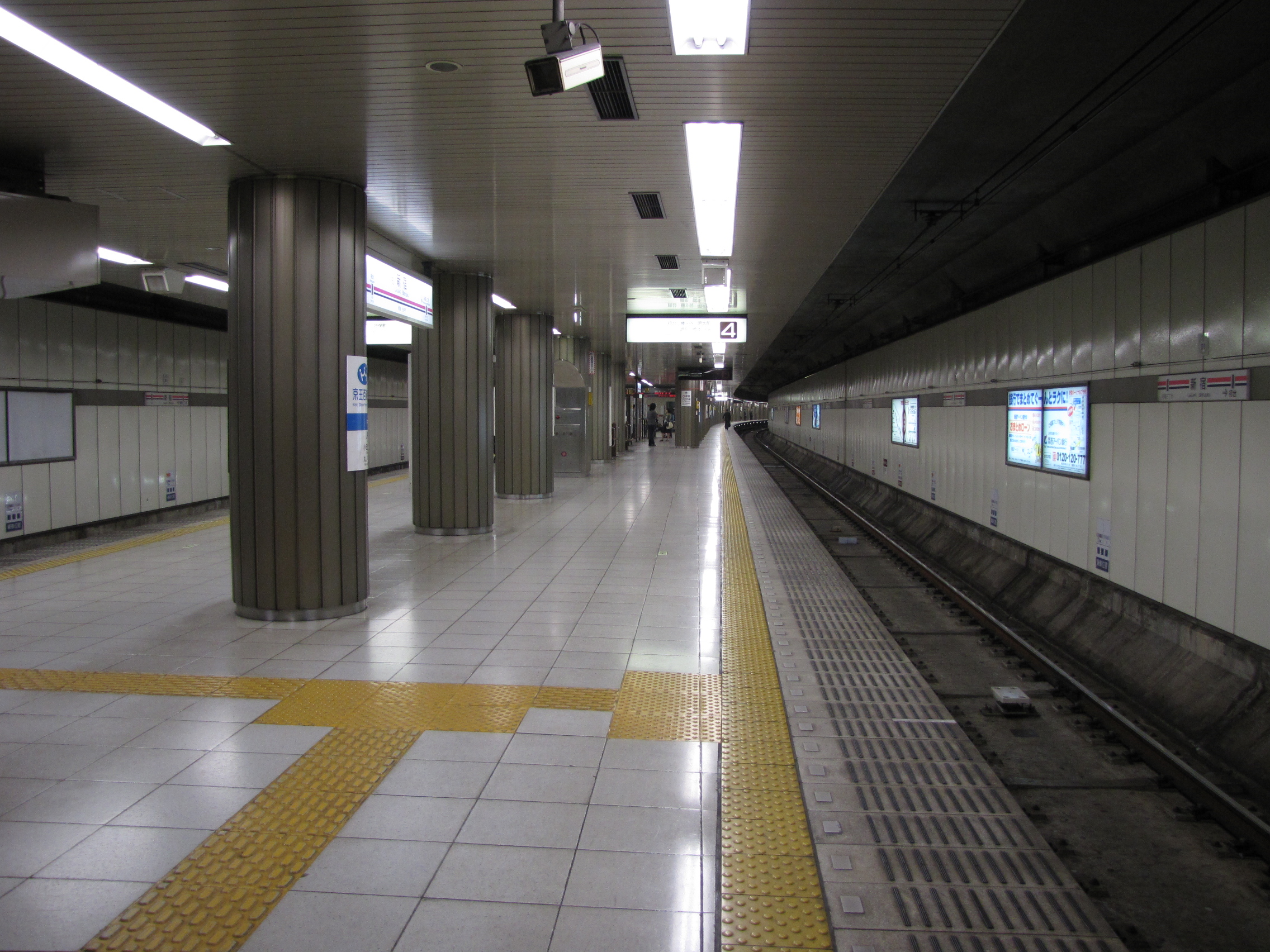
Island platform for Keio New Line and Toei Shinjuku Line, 2010

=== Toei Subway (Toei Oedo Line) ===
Shinjuku Station 新宿駅

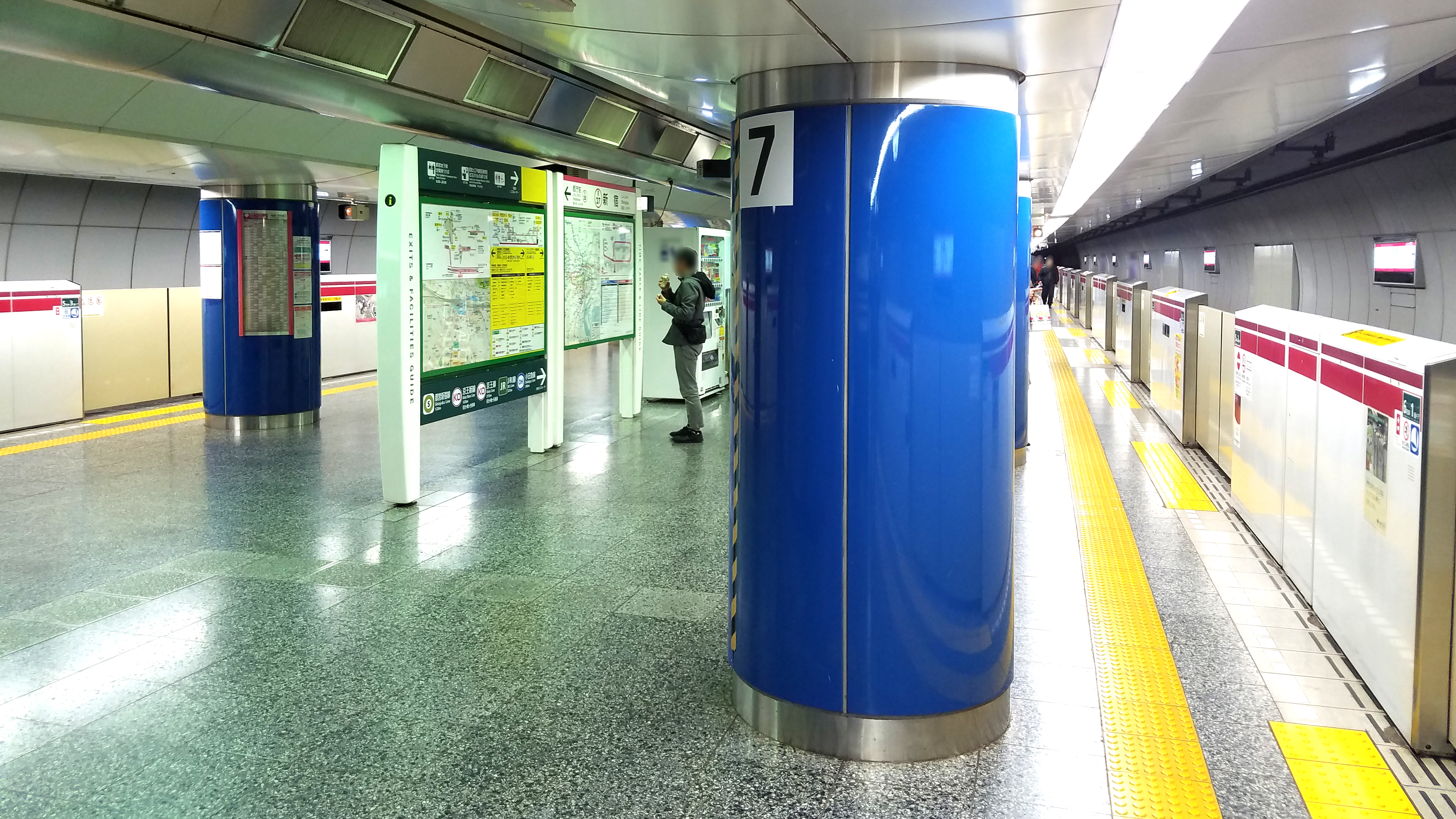
- Oedo Line platform

General information
- Location: 2-1-1 Yoyogi, Shibuya, Tokyo; Japan
- System: Toei Subway station
- Operator: Toei Subway
- Line: Ōedo Line
- Platforms: 1 island platform
- Tracks: 2
- Connections: Shinjuku Expressway Bus Terminal

Construction
- Structure type: Underground
- Accessible: Yes

Other information
- Station code: E-27

History
- Opened: 19 December 1997; 28 years ago

Services
Preceding station	Toei Subway	Following station
Tochomae towards Hikarigaoka	Ōedo Line	Yoyogi towards Tochōmae
Location

Toei Ōedo Line's two underground platforms stretch north–south to the south of the Toei Shinjuku Line and Keio New Line facilities. This is on the 7th basement floor of Tokyo prefectural road 414(Yotsuya-Tsunohazu Ave.).

6	Ōedo Line	for Roppongi and Daimon
7	Ōedo Line	for Tochōmae and Hikarigaoka

=== Tokyo Metro ===
Shinjuku Station 新宿駅

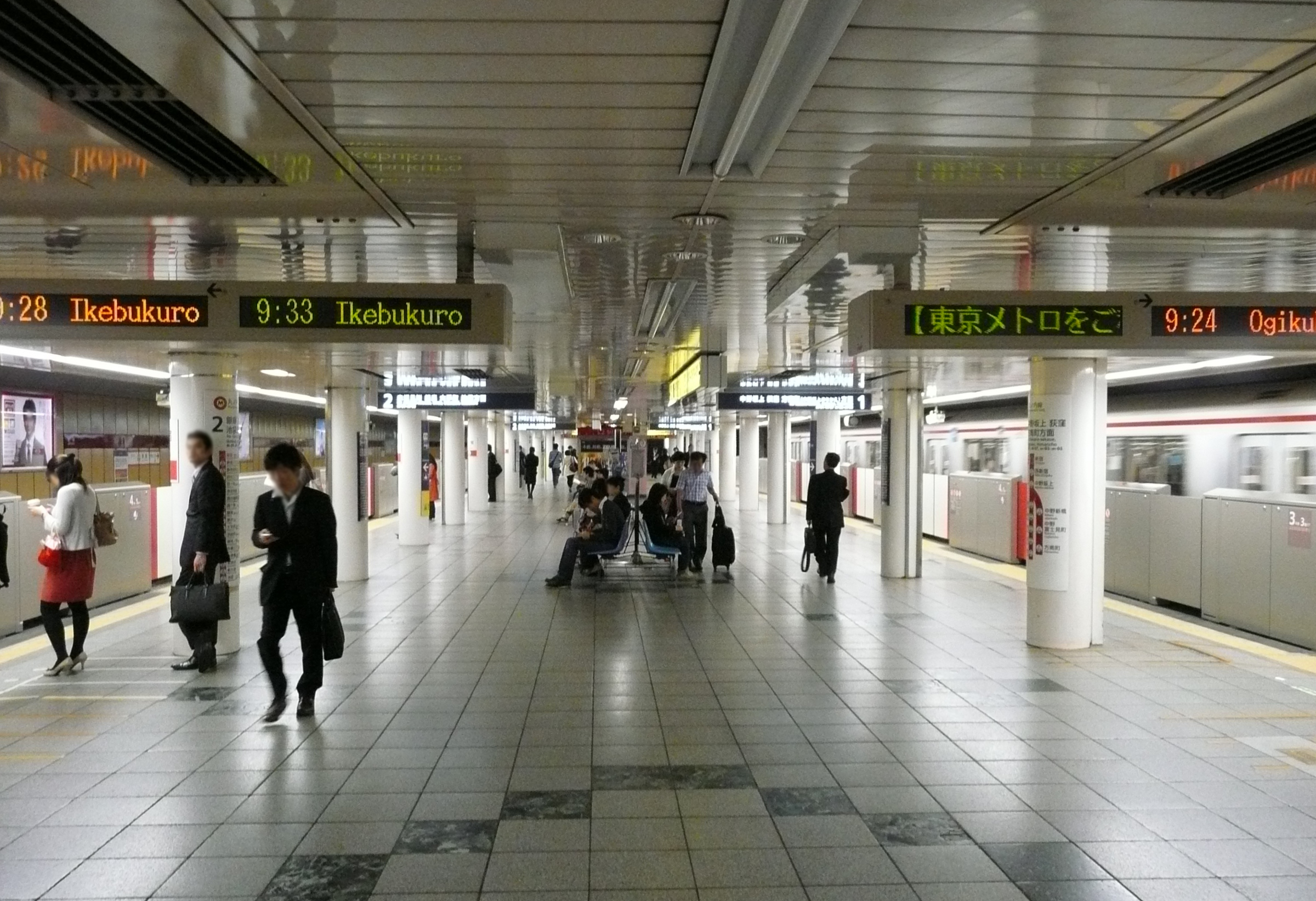
- Marunouchi Line platform

General information
- Location: 1st Nishiguchi Chikagai,1 Nishishinjuku, Shinjuku, Tokyo; Japan
- System: Tokyo Metro station
- Operator: Tokyo Metro
- Line: Marunouchi Line
- Platforms: 1 island platform
- Tracks: 2

Construction
- Structure type: Underground
- Accessible: Yes

Other information
- Station code: M-08

History
- Opened: 15 March 1959; 67 years ago

Passengers
- FY2024: 199,942 daily

Services
Preceding station	Tokyo Metro	Following station
Nishi-Shinjuku towards Ogikubo or Hōnanchō	Marunouchi Line	Shinjuku-sanchome towards Ikebukuro
Location

Tokyo Metro's two Marunouchi Line underground platforms stretch east–west to the north of the JR and Odakyu facilities, directly below the Metro Promenade underground mall.

1	Marunouchi Line	for Nakano-sakaue, Ogikubo, and Hōnanchō
2	Marunouchi Line	for Akasaka-mitsuke, Ginza, Ōtemachi, and Ikebukuro

=== Commercial facilities ===
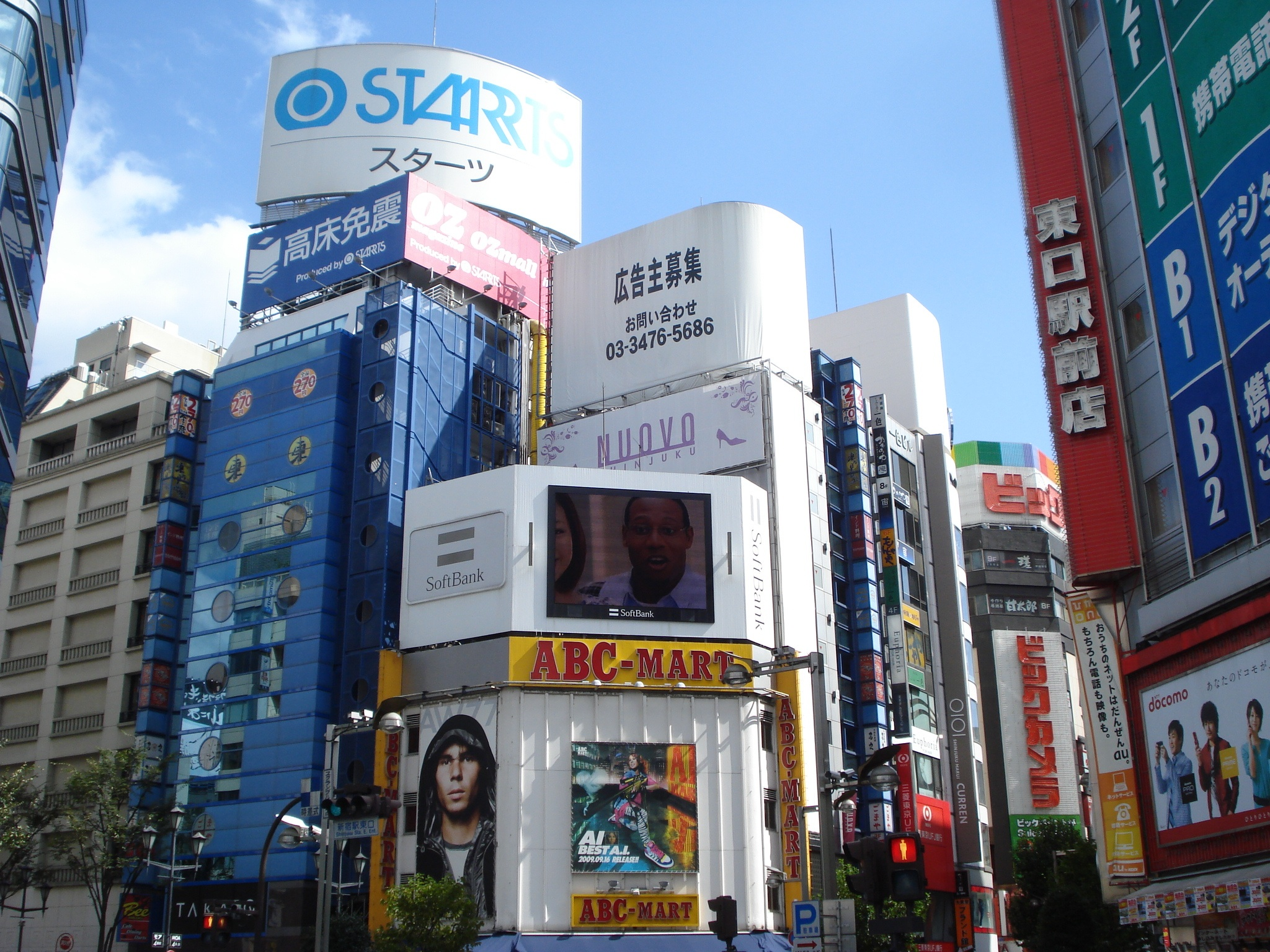
East exit of Shinjuku Station

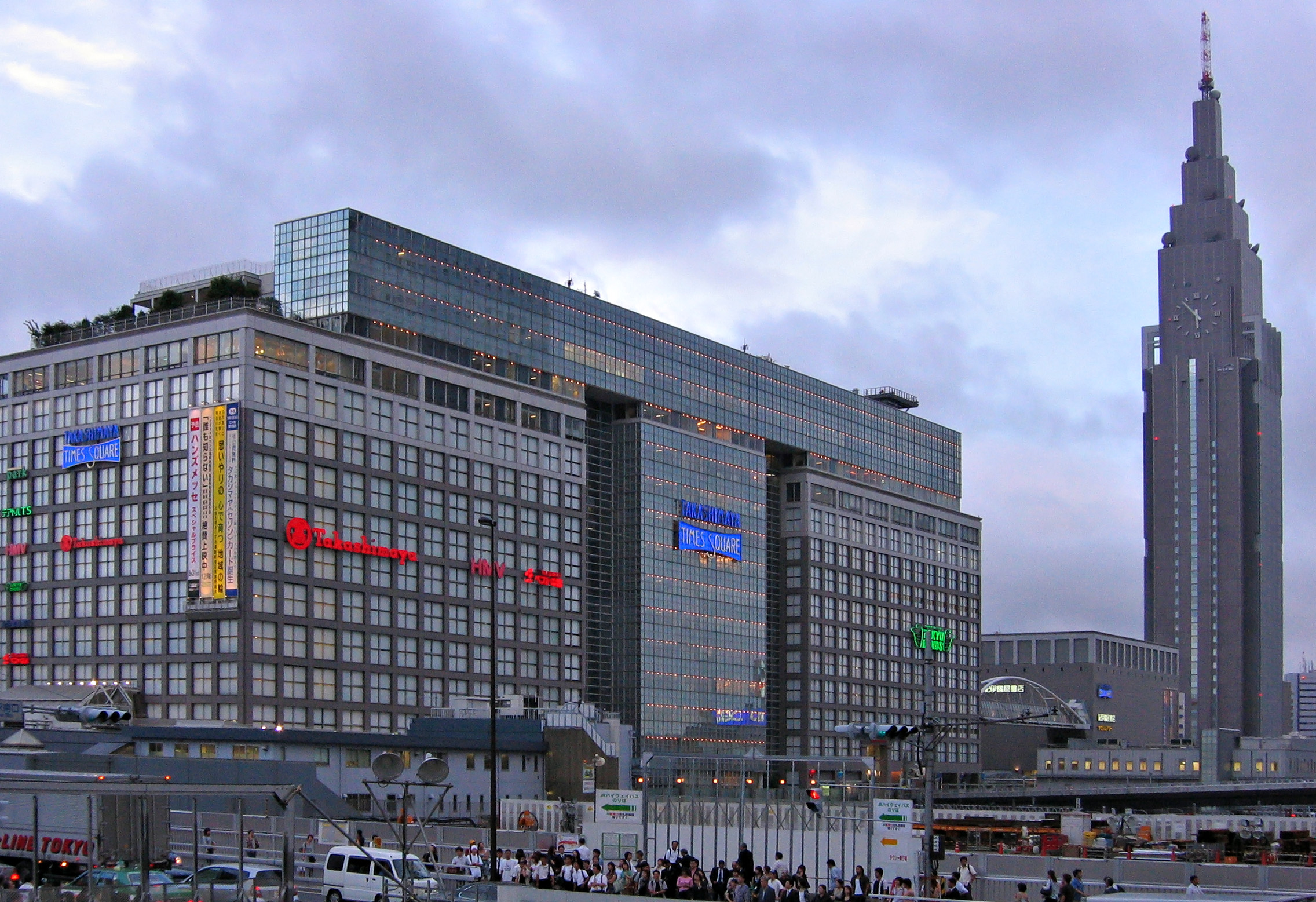
South exit of Shinjuku Station

Many department stores and shopping malls are built directly into the station, some operated by the railroads. These include:

- Lumine Est – above JR's east exit
- Odakyu department store – above the Odakyu line concourse (Closed down in October 2022.)
- Odakyu Mylord – above the southern end of the Odakyu line concourse
- Lumine 1 shopping mall – above the Keio Line concourse
- Lumine 2 shopping mall – above JR's south and Lumine exits
- Keio Department store – above the Keio Line concourse
- Keio Mall – underground mall to the southwest of the Keio Line concourse
- Odakyu Ace – underground malls beneath the bus terminal by the west exit.

In addition to the above, the Metro Promenade, which is an underground mall owned by Tokyo Metro, extends eastwards from the station beneath Shinjuku-dori avenue, all the way to the adjacent Shinjuku-sanchōme station with 60 exits along the way. The Metro Promenade in turn connects to Shinjuku Subnade, another underground shopping mall, which leads onto Seibu Railway's Seibu-Shinjuku station.

Shinjuku Station is connected by underground passageways and shopping malls to

- Nishi-shinjuku Station (Tokyo Metro Marunouchi Line)
- Seibu-Shinjuku Station (Seibu Shinjuku Line)
- Shinjuku-nishiguchi Station (Toei Ōedo Line)
- Shinjuku-sanchōme Station (Tokyo Metro Marunouchi Line, Tokyo Metro Fukutoshin Line, and Toei Shinjuku Line)
- Tochōmae Station (Toei Ōedo Line)

Nearby non-connected stations (within 500 meters of an underground passageway or station) include

- Shinjuku-gyoemmae Station
- Yoyogi Station
- Higashi-shinjuku Station
- Okubo Station
- Shin-Okubo Station
- Minami-Shinjuku Station

=== Bus terminals ===
There is a bus terminal at the west exit servicing both local and long-distance buses and a JR Highway Bus terminal at the New South Gates.

On April 4, 2016, the new bus terminal and commercial facilities nearby the south exit, named Busta Shinjuku (Shinjuku Expressway Bus Terminal), opened for service. Considerable numbers of coaches and airport buses depart from this new terminal.

== Passenger statistics ==
=== 1953－2000 ===
Source: Tokyo Metropolitan Government

- JR East
- Tokyo Metro
- Toei Shinjuku Line
- Toei Oedo Line
- Odakyu Line
- Keio Line

The figures below are the official number of passengers entering and exiting (except for JR East) each day released by each train operator. The figure for JR East only includes entering passengers.

Operator		Number	Fiscal year	Source	Note
JR East		751,018 (boarding only)	2013		Boarding passengers only. The busiest station in Japan.
Odakyu		494,184	2013		The busiest Odakyu station
Keio		730,849	2013		The busiest Keio station, the sum of the ridership of the Keiō New Line and Keiō Line.
Tokyo Metro		227,366	2013		The 6th busiest Tokyo Metro station
Toei	Shinjuku Line	266,869	2013	134,185 entries and 132,684 exits	The busiest Toei subway station
Toei	Oedo Line	133,075	2013	64,701 entries and 68,374 exits	The busiest Toei subway station

Average number of passengers per day by fiscal year for the JR East station (1913–1935)

Fiscal year	Daily average
1913	5,052
1915	4,684
1920	14,358
1925	40,061
1930	71,555
1935	66,230

Average number of passengers per day by fiscal year for the JR East station (1953–2000)

Fiscal year	Daily average
1953	133,435
1955	153,313
1960	305,236
1965	389,700
1970	472,841
1971	614,419
1975	652,642
1980	625,707
1984	648,659
1990	709,490
1991	741,421
1992	735,192
1993	741,342
1994	740,063
1995	743,710
1996	767,800
1997	765,518
1998	756,551
1999	756,772
2000	753,791

=== 2000－present ===
Average number of passengers per day by fiscal year for the JR East station (2001–present)

Fiscal year	Daily average
2001	745,153
2002	748,515
2003	746,293
2004	742,183
2005	747,930
2006	757,013
2007	785,801
2008	766,020
2009	748,522
2010	736,715
2011	734,154
2012	742,833
2013	751,018
2014	748,157
2015	760,043
2016	769,307
2017	778,618
2018	789,366
2019	775,386
2020	477,073
2021	522,178
2022	602,558
2023	650,602
2024	666,809

Source: Tokyo Metropolitan Government

- JR East
- Tokyo Metro
- Toei Shinjuku Line
- Toei Oedo Line
- Odakyu Line
- Keio Line

== Cultural references ==
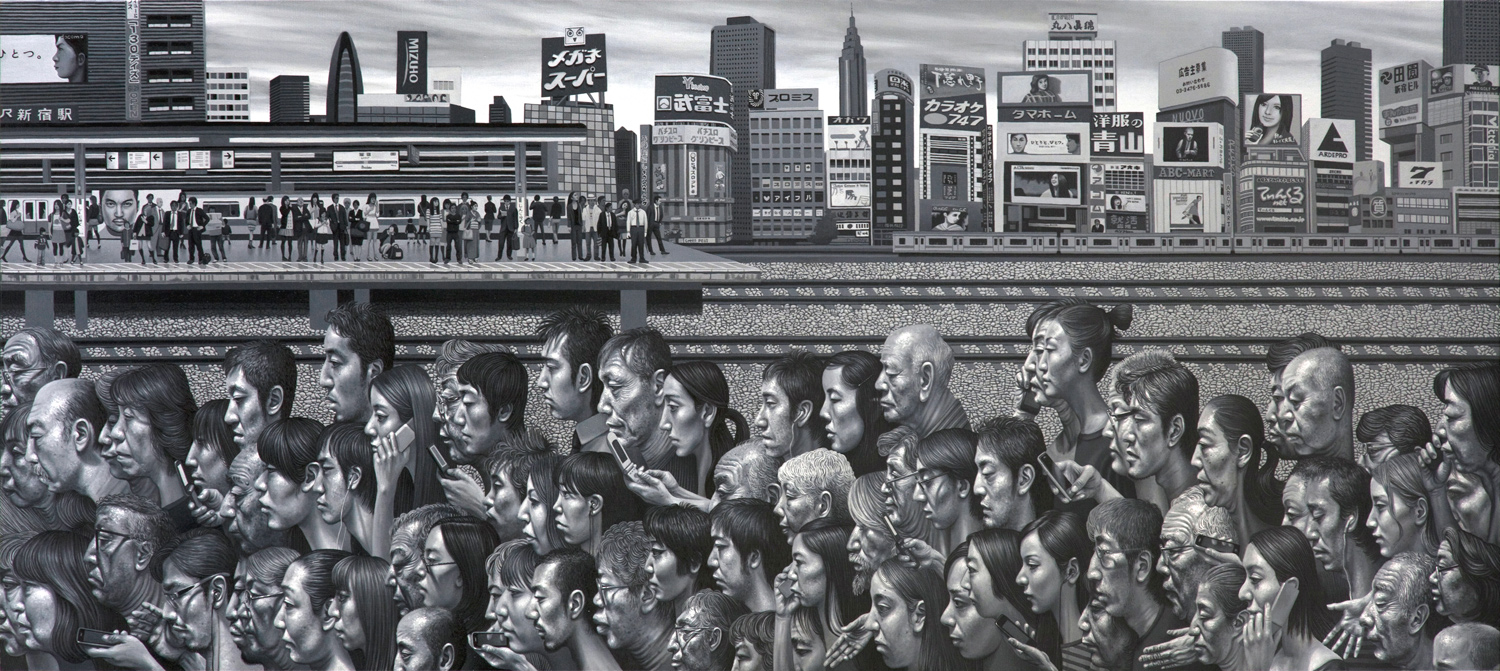
Shinjuku, by Carl Randall

The station and other parts of the Toei Ōedo Line are referenced in the Digimon Adventure franchise. Contemporary British painter Carl Randall (who spent ten years living in Tokyo as an artist) depicted the station area in his large oil painting Shinjuku, exhibited at the National Portrait Gallery in London in 2013.

Shinjuku also served as the backdrop to the finale of the manga/anime Jujutsu Kaisen from Chapters 223-267, in the “Inhuman Makyo Shinjuku Showdown”.

== See also ==
- List of East Japan Railway Company stations
- List of railway stations in Japan
- Transport in Greater Tokyo
- World's busiest railway stations
