= Nihonbashi =

Business district in Tokyo, Japan

Coordinates: 35°41′02″N 139°46′28″E

Nihonbashi 日本橋
- Central business district
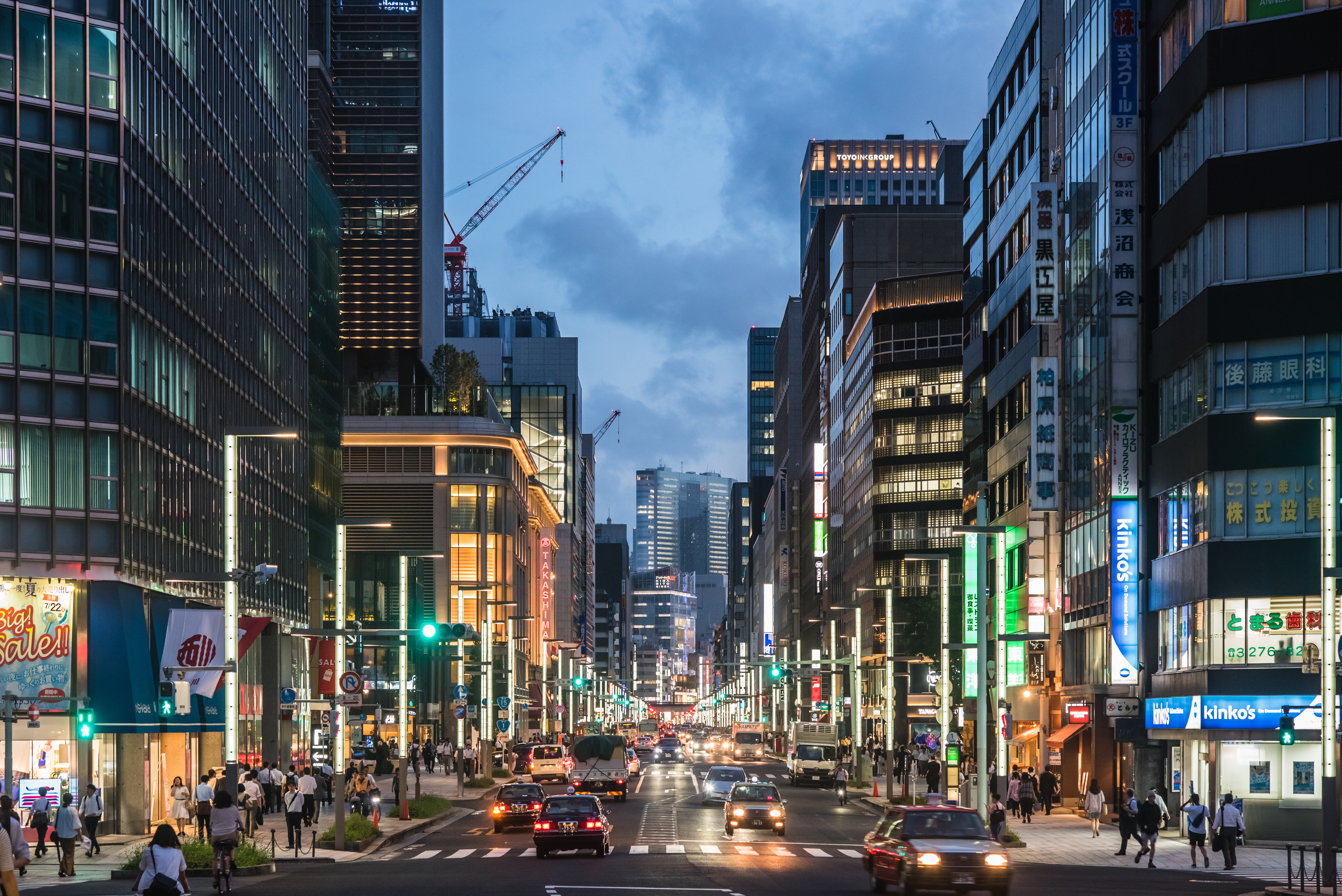
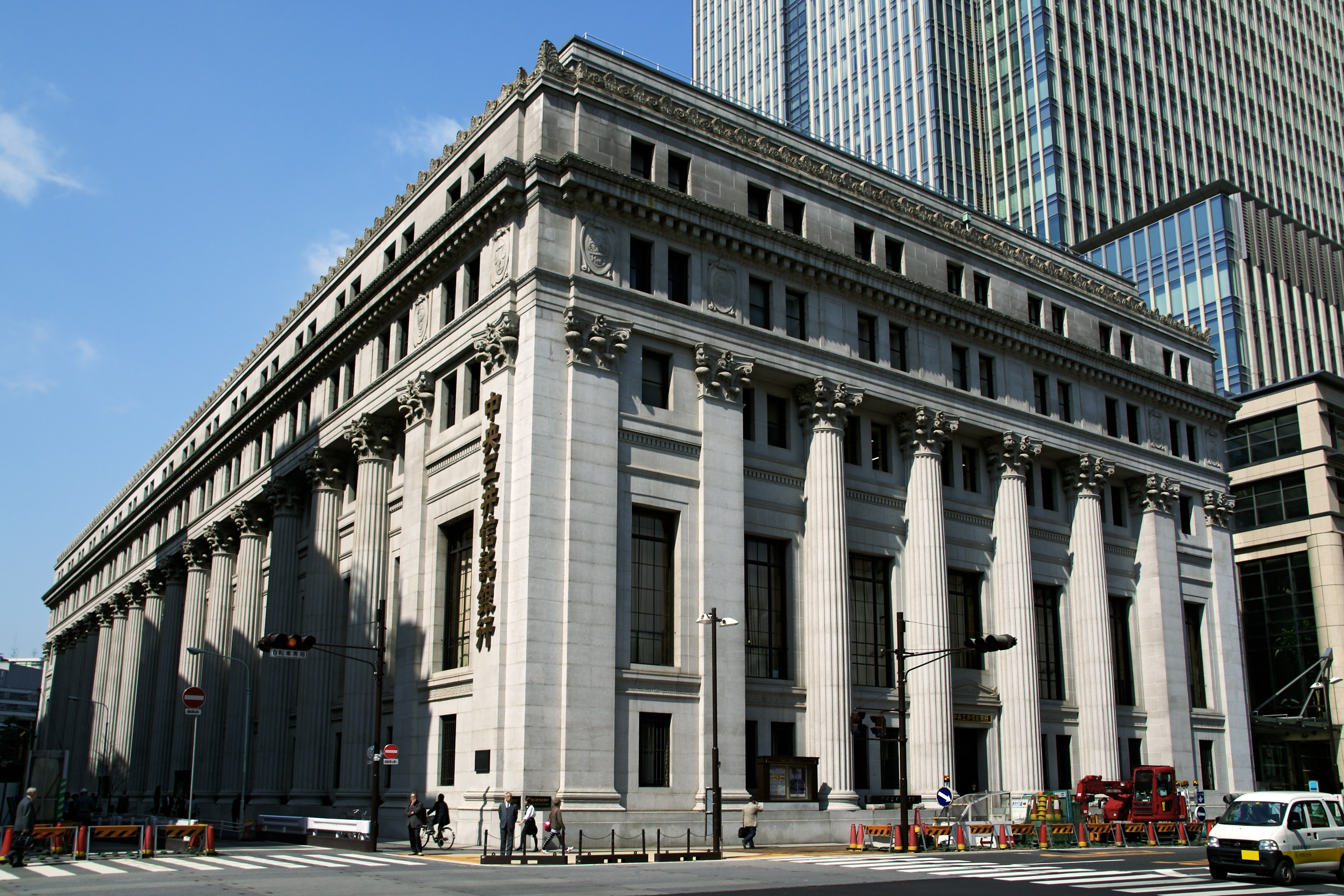
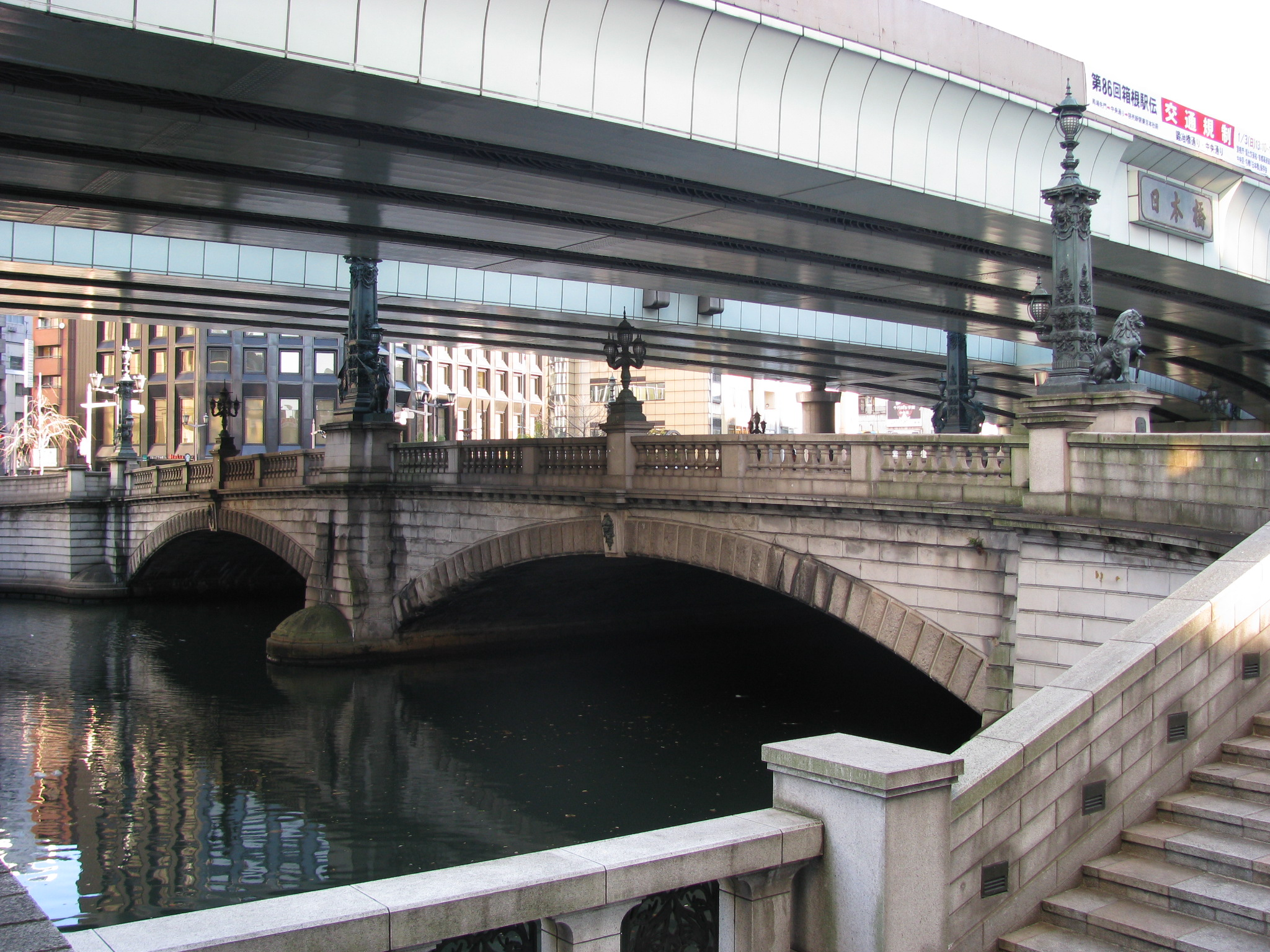
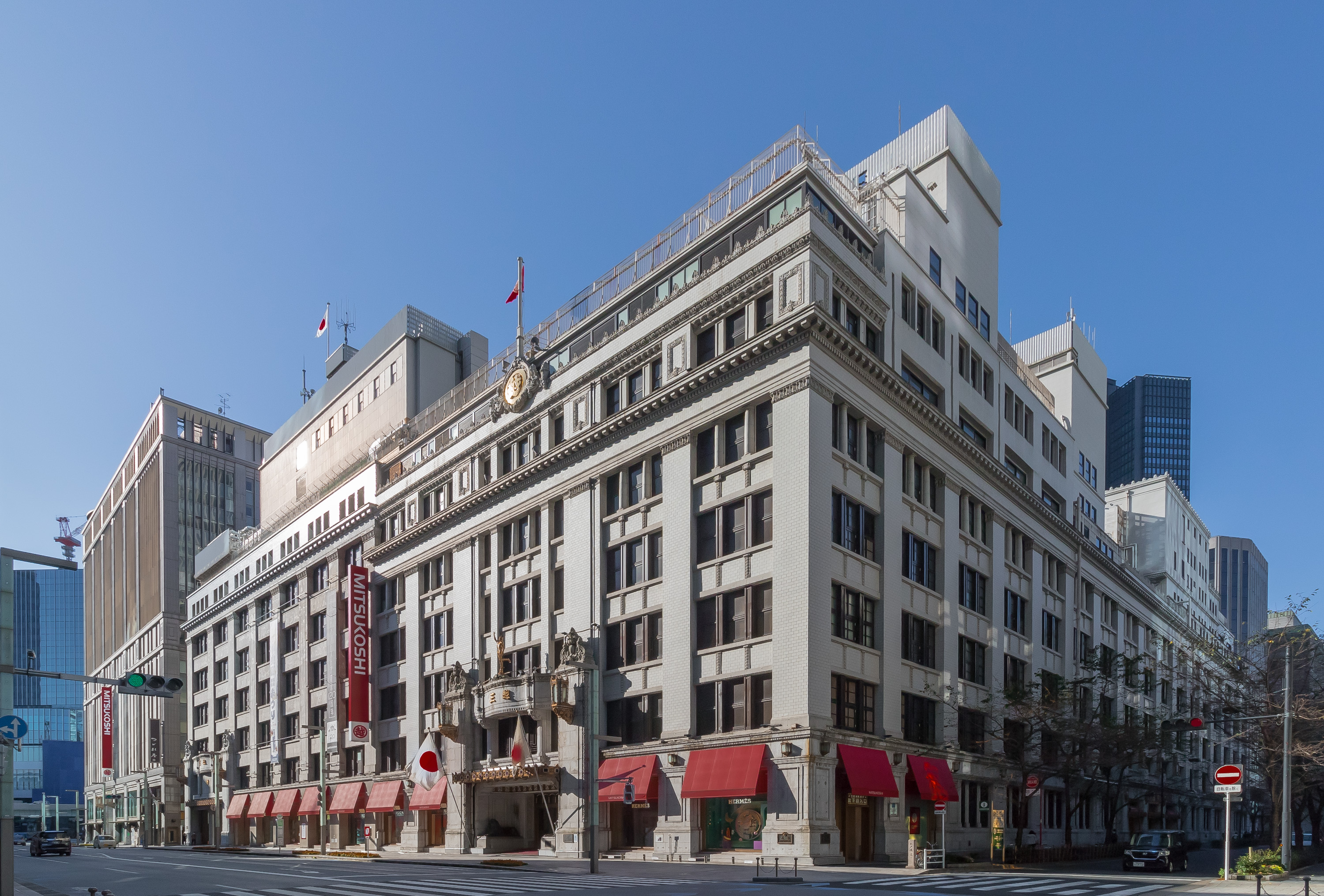
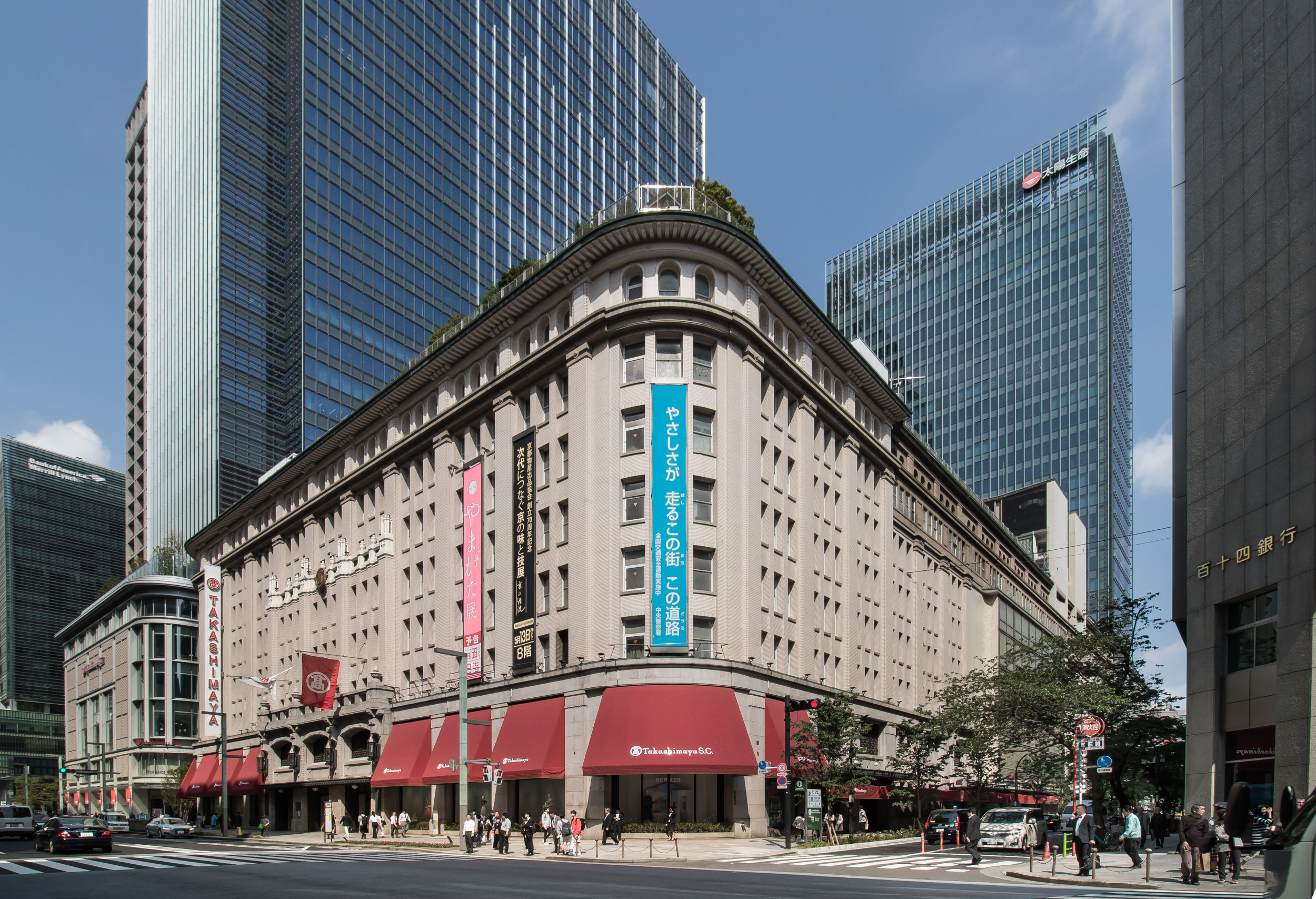
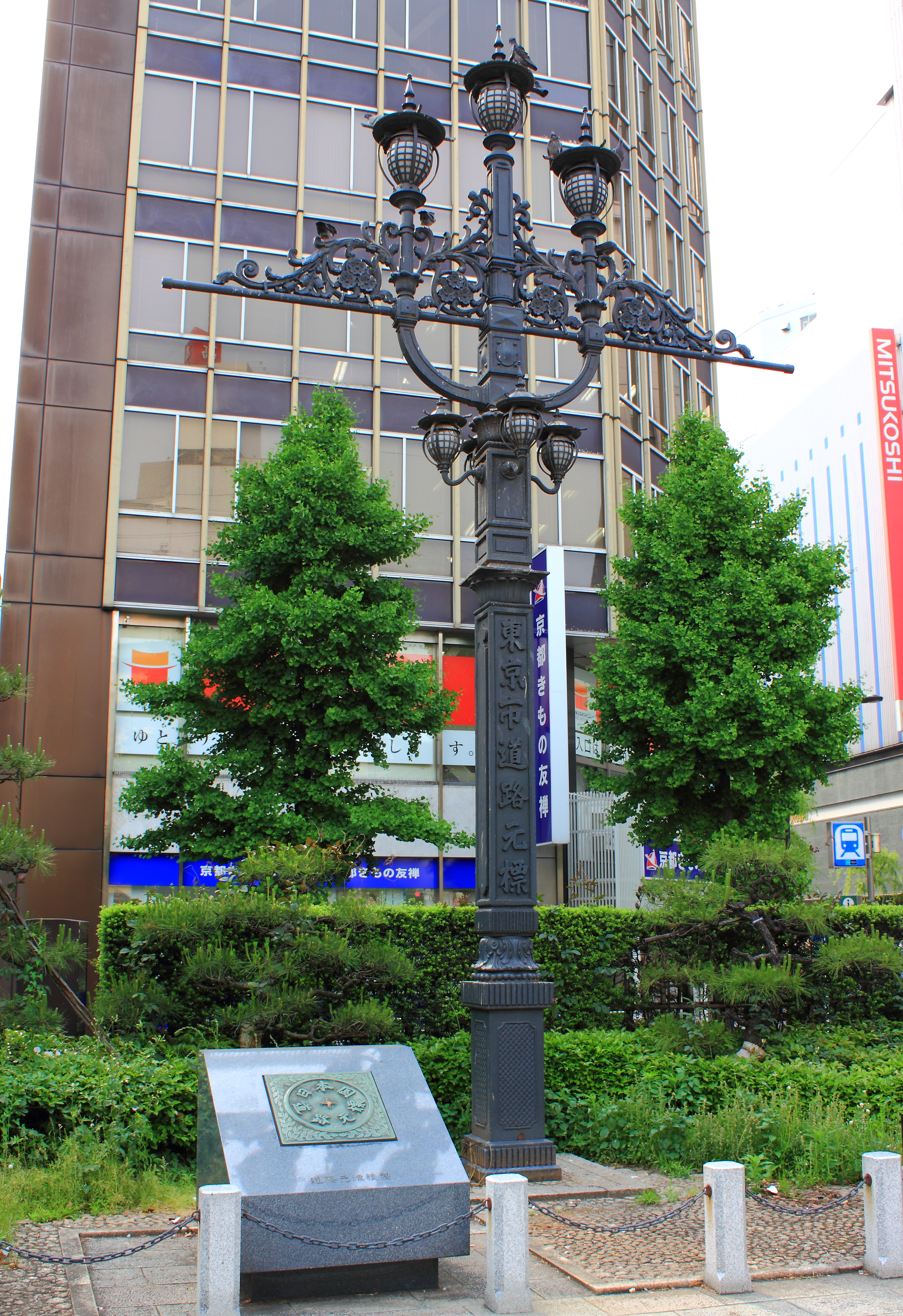
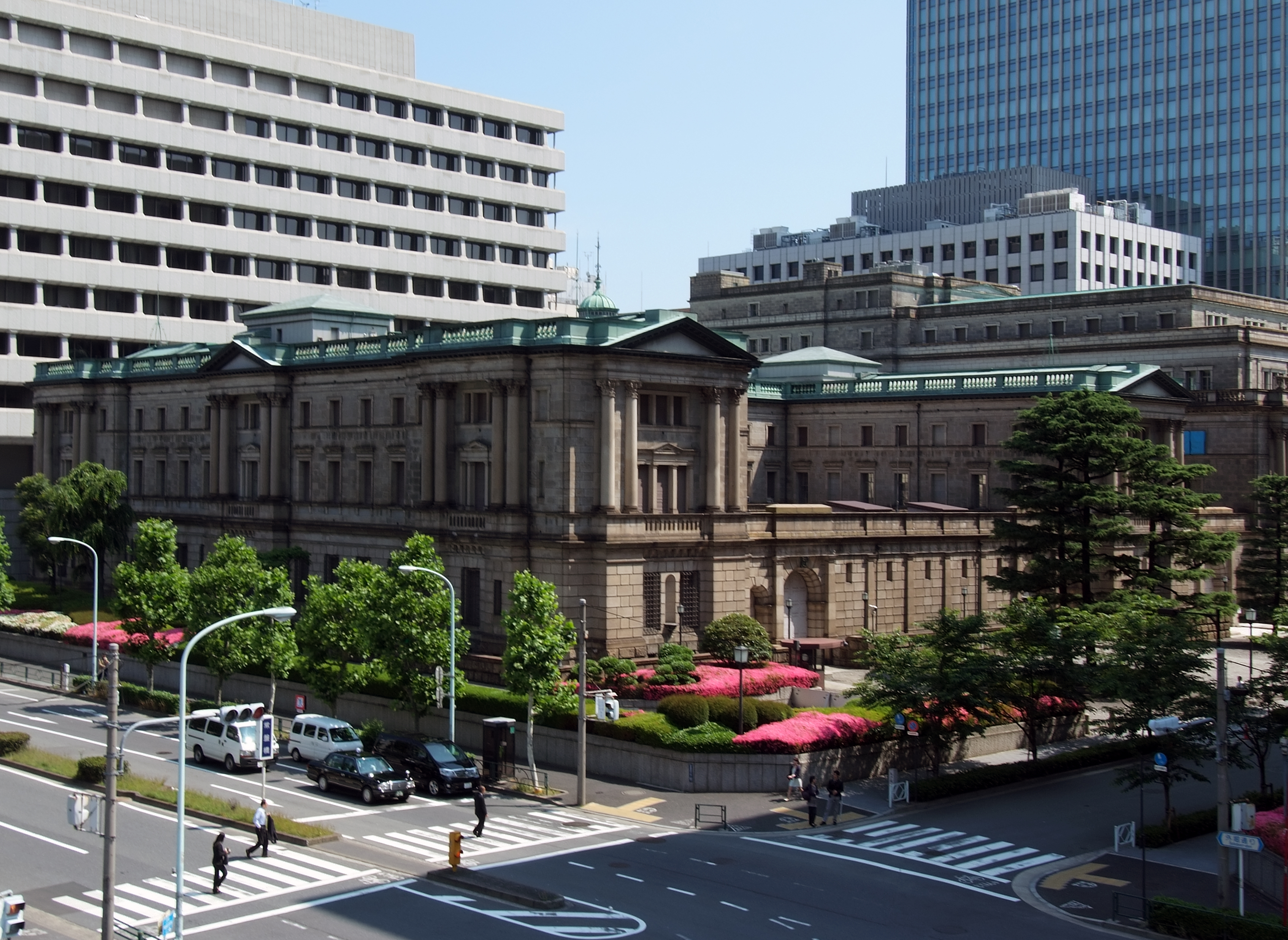
- Nihonbashi Street Mitsui Headquarters Nihonbashi Bridge, after which the area was named Mitsukoshi Nihonbashi Flagship Store Takashimaya Nihonbashi Flagship Store Kilometre zero of Japan Bank of Japan
- Interactive map of Nihonbashi

Population (2019)
  - Total: 341
- Postal code: 100-0013

Nihonbashi (日本橋, Nihonbashi; Japanese pronunciation: [ɲ̟ì.hó̞ḿ.bä́.ɕí], (Note: The bridge's name and placename in Tokyo is pronounced like this. The bridge's name and placename in Osaka is pronounced [ɲ̟ìp̚.pó̞m̀.bä̀.ɕì, -pó̞ḿ.bä́.ɕí]. For the pronunciations of 日本, see Names of Japan.) also romanized as Nihombashi) is a business district of Chūō, Tokyo, Japan, which sprung up around the bridge of the same name that has linked two sides of the Nihonbashi River at this site since the 17th century. The first wooden bridge was completed in 1603. The current bridge, designed by Tsumaki Yorinaka and constructed of stone on a steel frame, dates from 1911. The district covers a large area to the north and east of the bridge, reaching Kanda to the north and the Sumida River to the east. Ōtemachi and Yaesu are to the west and Kyobashi to the south.

Nihonbashi, together with Kyobashi and Kanda, is the core of Shitamachi, the original downtown center of Edo-Tokyo, before the rise of newer secondary centers such as Shinjuku and Shibuya.

== History ==
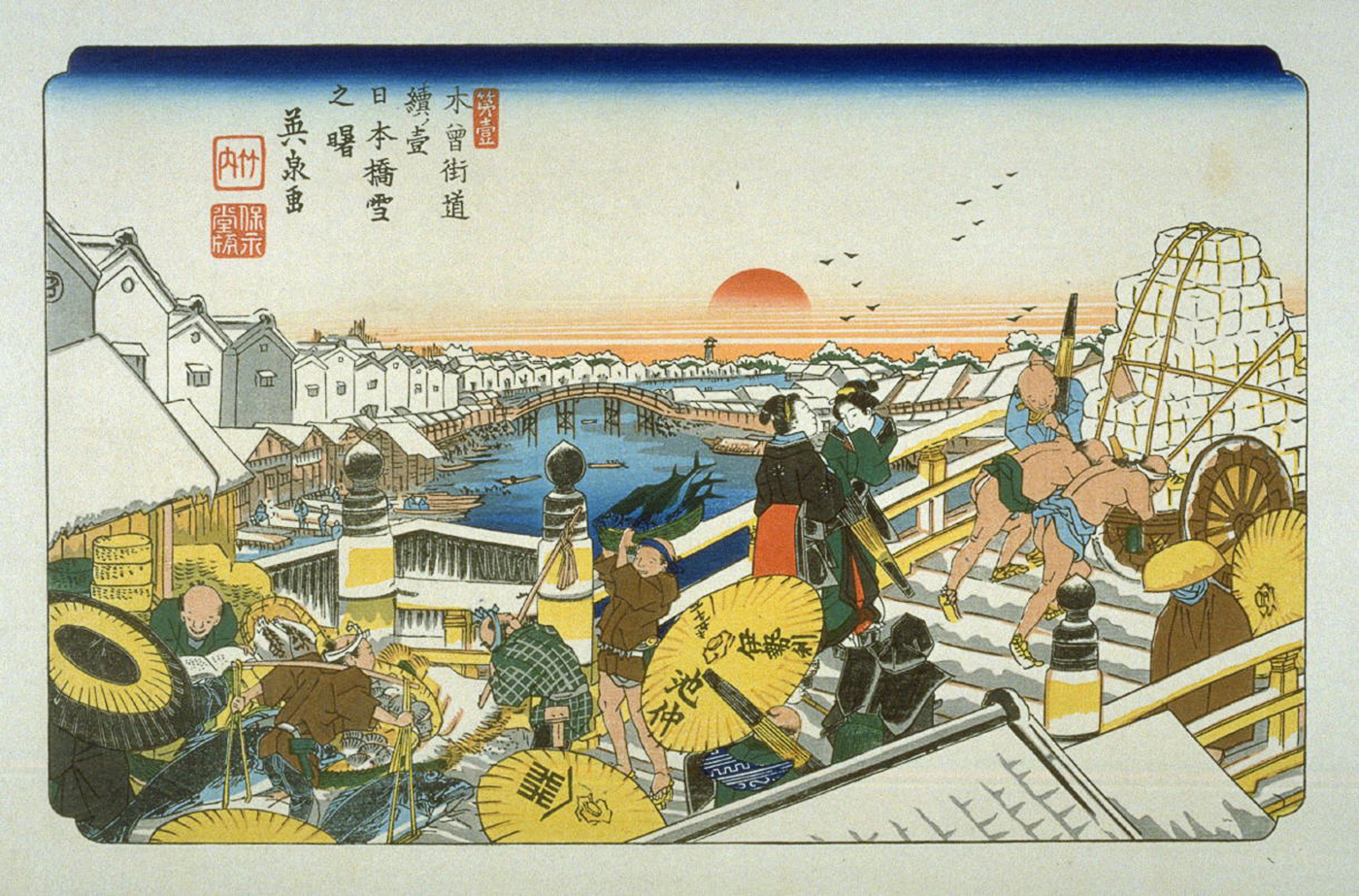
Ukiyo-e print of Nihonbashi by Keisai Eisen, c. 1836 (from The Sixty-Nine Stations of the Kiso Kaidō)

The Nihonbashi district was a major mercantile center during the Edo period: its early development is largely credited to the Mitsui family, who based their wholesaling business in Nihonbashi and developed Japan's first department store, Mitsukoshi, there. The Edo-era fish market formerly in Nihonbashi was the predecessor of the Tsukiji and Toyosu Markets. Yamamotoyama began as a tea house here in 1690.

In later years, Nihonbashi emerged as Tokyo's (and Japan's) predominant financial district.

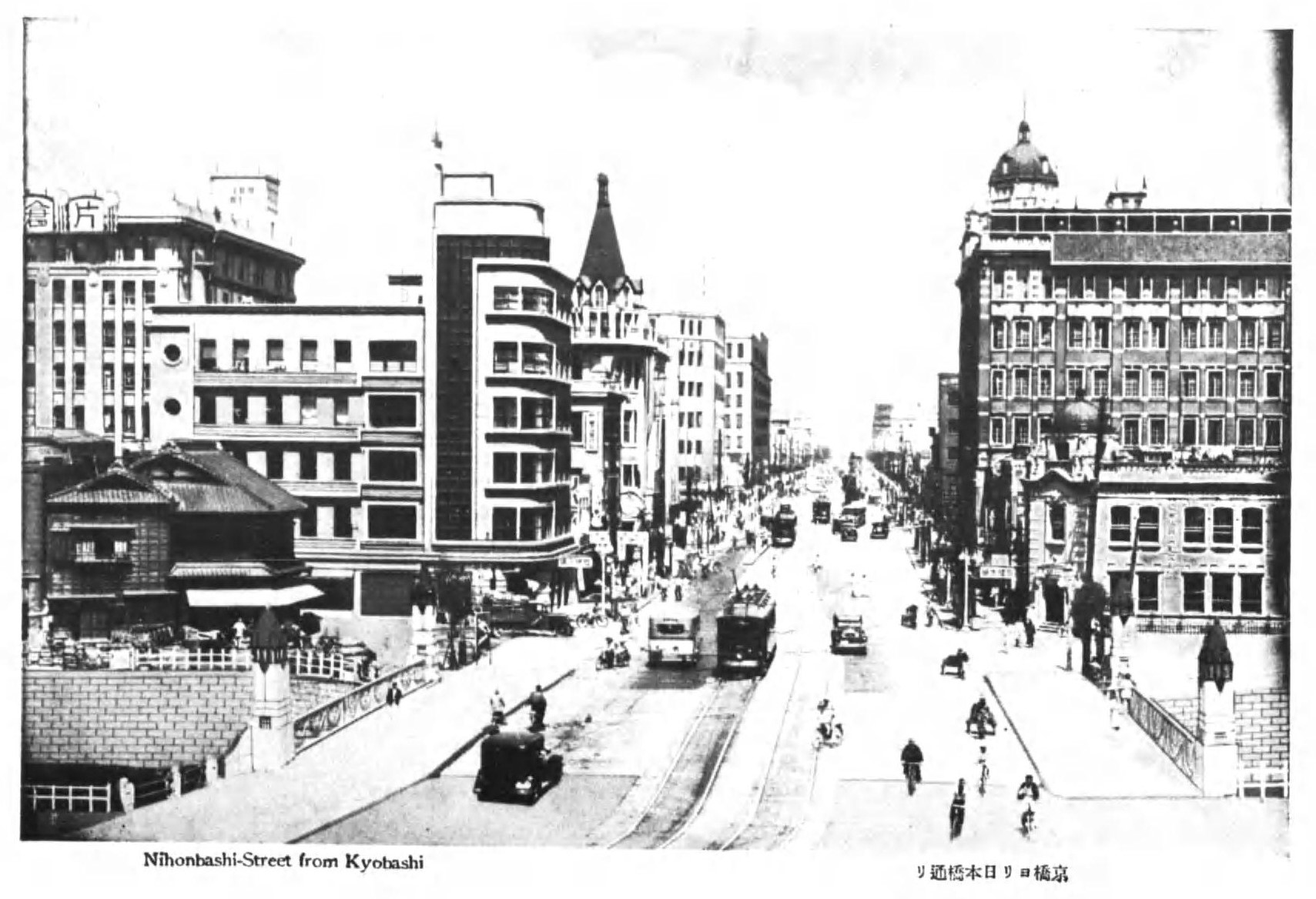
Nihonbashi Street in 1937

The Nihonbashi bridge first became famous during the 17th century, when it was the eastern terminus of the Nakasendō and the Tōkaidō, roads which ran between Edo and Kyoto. During this time, it was known as Edobashi, or "Edo Bridge." In the Meiji era, the wooden bridge was replaced by a larger stone bridge, which still stands today (a replica of the old bridge has been exhibited at the Edo-Tokyo Museum). It is the point from which all distances are measured to the capital; highway signs indicating the distance to Tokyo actually state the number of kilometres to Nihonbashi.

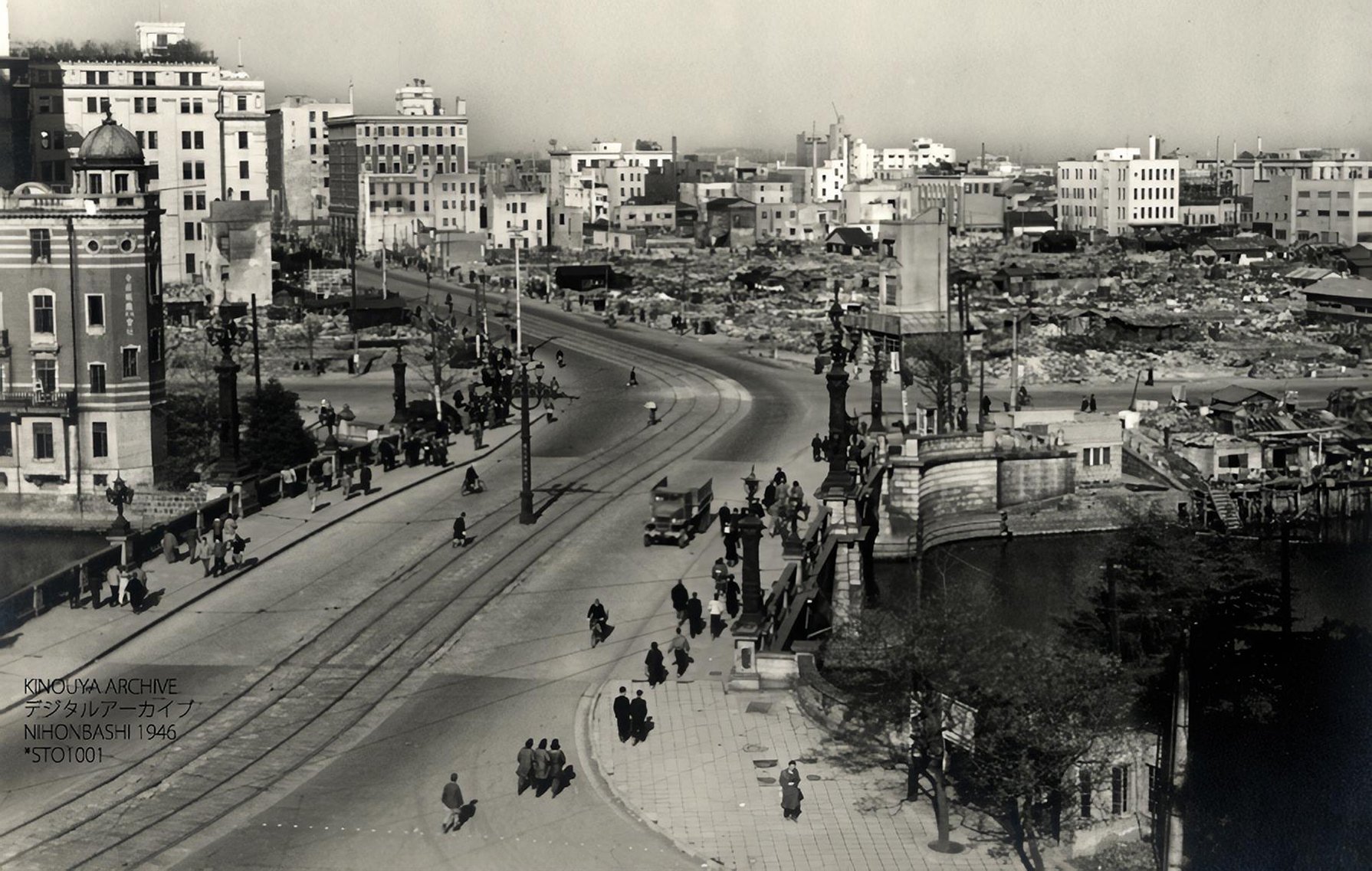
Nihonbashi in 1946

The area surrounding the bridge was burned to the ground during the massive March 9–10, 1945 bombing of Tokyo, considered the single largest air raid in history. Despite careful maintenance and restoration, one area of the bridge still has scars burned into the stone from an incendiary bomb. It is one of the few traces left from the fire bombing that leveled most of Tokyo.

Nihonbashi was a ward of Tokyo City. In 1947, when the 35 wards of Tokyo were reorganized into 23, it was merged with Kyōbashi to form the modern Chuo ward.

Shortly before the 1964 Summer Olympics, an expressway was built over the Nihonbashi bridge, obscuring the classic view of Mount Fuji from the bridge. In recent years, local citizens have petitioned the government to move this expressway underground. This plan was endorsed by Prime Minister Junichiro Koizumi in 2005, and the Tokyo Metropolitan Government and Ministry of Land, Infrastructure, Transport and Tourism announced in 2017 that they would begin a detailed study of the project, with a goal of beginning construction following the 2020 Summer Olympics in Tokyo. The operator of the Shuto Expressway received approval for construction in May 2020, which will relocate 1.8 kilometers of the expressway underground between Kandabashi and Edobashi Junctions. Construction has commenced and is expected to be completed in fiscal year 2041.

Skyscrapers will also be built in the area, transforming its overall image.

Gallery

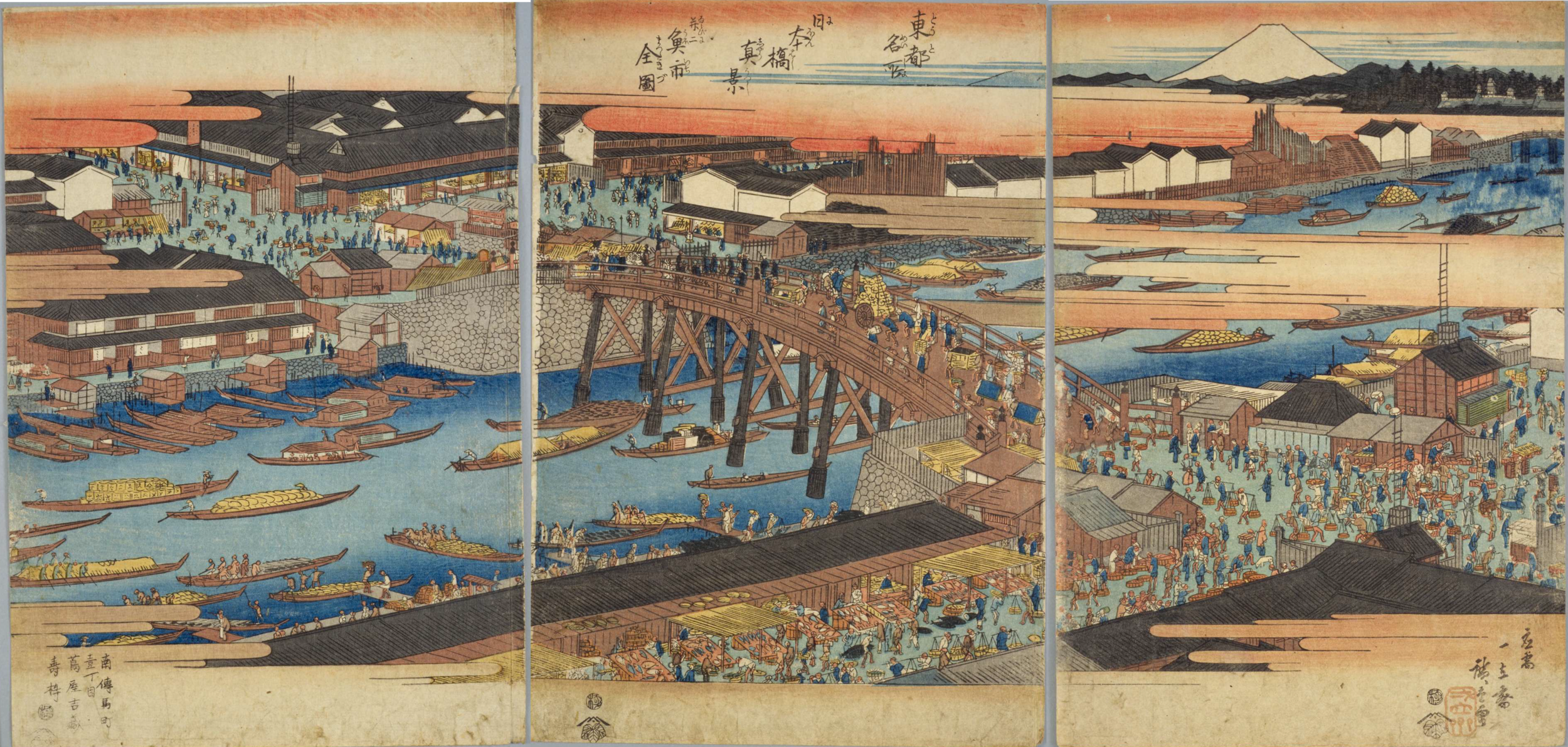
Nihonbashi bridge 1830s by Hiroshige

== Places in Nihonbashi ==
- Bank of Japan
- Mitsukoshi and Takashimaya department stores
- COREDO NIHONBASHI (ja)
- Nihonbashi Mitsui Tower
  - Mandarin Oriental, Tokyo (ja)
- Tokyo Stock Exchange
- Kilometre Zero for entire Japan

== Companies based in Nihonbashi ==
Nihonbashi (日本橋)

- Akebono Brake Industry
- Bank of America Merrill Lynch Japan
- HSBC Japan
- Ippon Doll Works
- KOSÉ
- Kureha Corporation
- Maruzen
- MODEC
- Nissan Chemical Corporation
- Nisshinbo Holdings
- Nomura Holdings
- Takashimaya
- Takeda Pharmaceutical Company

Hakozakicho (箱崎町)

- IBM Japan - IBM Hakozaki Facility

Honcho (本町)

- Daiichi-Sankyo

Muromachi (室町)

- Mitsui Fudosan
- Mitsukoshi
- Sembikiya
- Woven Planet
- Shinsei Bank

In the late 1990s GeoCities Japan was headquartered in the Nihonbashi Hakozaki Building in Hakozakicho. At one time Creatures Inc. had its headquarters in the Kawasakiteitoku Building (川崎定徳ビル, Kawasakiteitoku Biru) in Nihonbashi.

== Organizations based in Nihonbashi ==
- Japan-India Association

== Railway and subway stations ==
=== Subway stations ===
- Bakuro-yokoyama Station (馬喰横山駅) - Toei Shinjuku Line (S-09)
- Hamachō Station (浜町駅) - Toei Shinjuku Line (S-10)
- Higashi-nihombashi Station (東日本橋駅) - Toei Asakusa Line (A-15)
- Kayabachō Station (茅場町駅) - Tokyo Metro Hibiya Line (H-13), Tokyo Metro Tōzai Line (T-11)
- Kodemmachō Station (小伝馬町駅) - Tokyo Metro Hibiya Line (H-15)
- Mitsukoshimae Station (三越前駅) - Tokyo Metro Ginza Line (G-12), Tokyo Metro Hanzōmon Line (Z-09)
- Nihombashi Station (日本橋駅) - Toei Asakusa Line (A-13), Tokyo Metro Ginza Line (G-11), Tokyo Metro Tōzai Line (T-10)
- Ningyōchō Station (人形町駅) - Toei Asakusa Line (A-14), Tokyo Metro Hibiya Line (H-14)
- Suitengūmae Station (水天宮前駅) - Tokyo Metro Hanzōmon Line (Z-10)

=== Railway stations ===
- Bakurochō Station (馬喰町駅) - JR Sōbu Line (Rapid)
- Shin-Nihombashi Station (新日本橋駅) - JR Sōbu Line (Rapid)

== Education ==
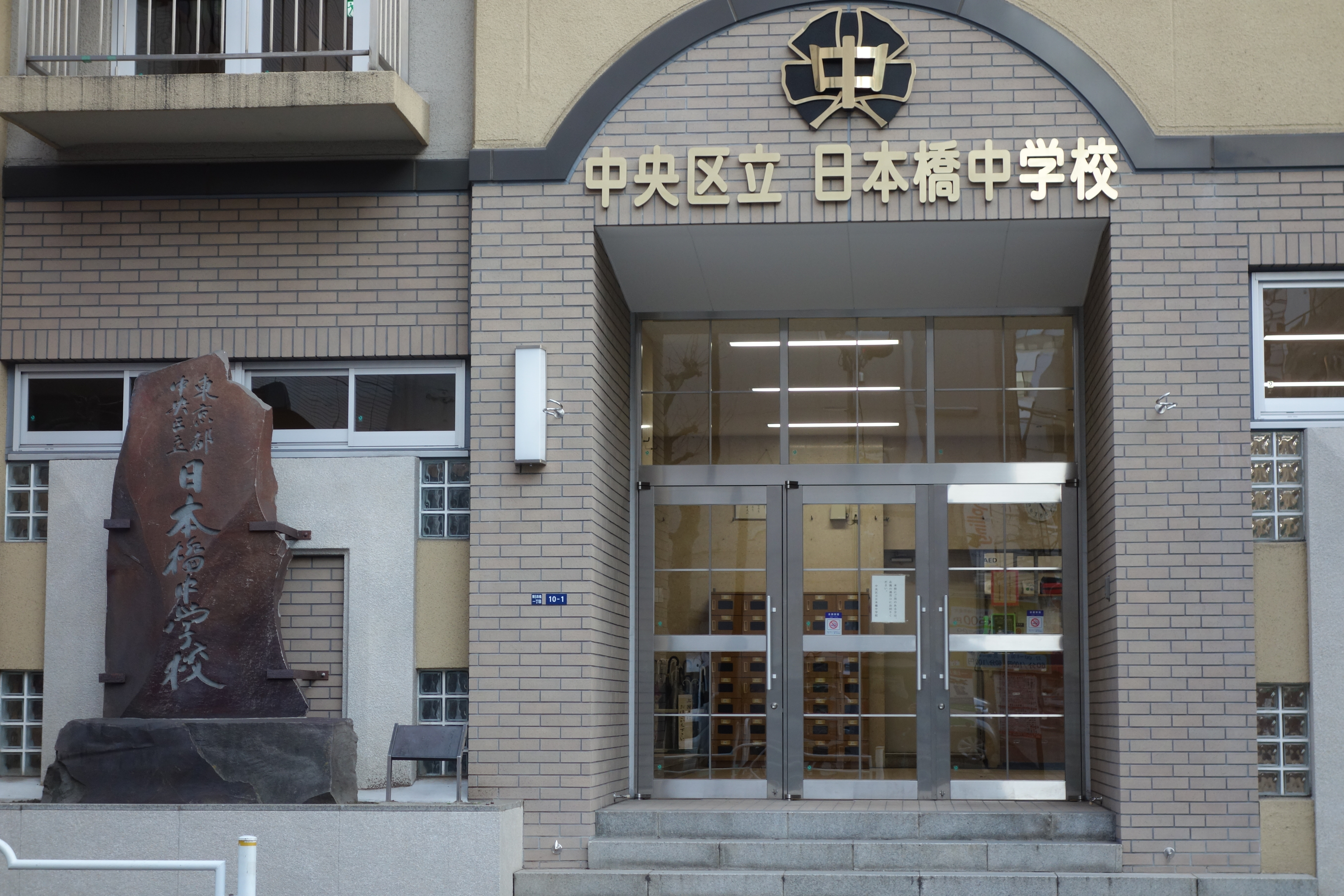
Nihonbashi Junior High School (中央区立日本橋中学校)

Public elementary and junior high schools are operated by Chuo City Board of Education (中央区教育委員会). Jōtō Elementary School (中央区立城東小学校) and Nihonbashi Junior High School (中央区立日本橋中学校) are the zoned public schools of the Nihonbashi District.

== Neighboring post towns ==
As the starting point for the five routes of the Edo period, Nihonbashi provided easy access to many parts throughout ancient Japan.

- Tōkaidō (connecting Edo to Kyoto, staying near the coast)

Nihonbashi (starting location) - Shinagawa-juku

- Nakasendō (connecting Edo to Kyoto, going through the mountains)

Nihonbashi (starting location) - Itabashi-juku

- Kōshū Kaidō (connecting Edo to Kai Province (modern-day Yamanashi Prefecture))

Nihonbashi (starting location) - Naitō Shinjuku

- Ōshū Kaidō (connecting Edo to Mutsu Province (modern-day Fukushima Prefecture))

Nihonbashi (starting location) - Hakutaku-juku

- Nikkō Kaidō (connecting Edo with Nikkō)

Nihonbashi (starting location) - Senju-juku

== Photo gallery ==
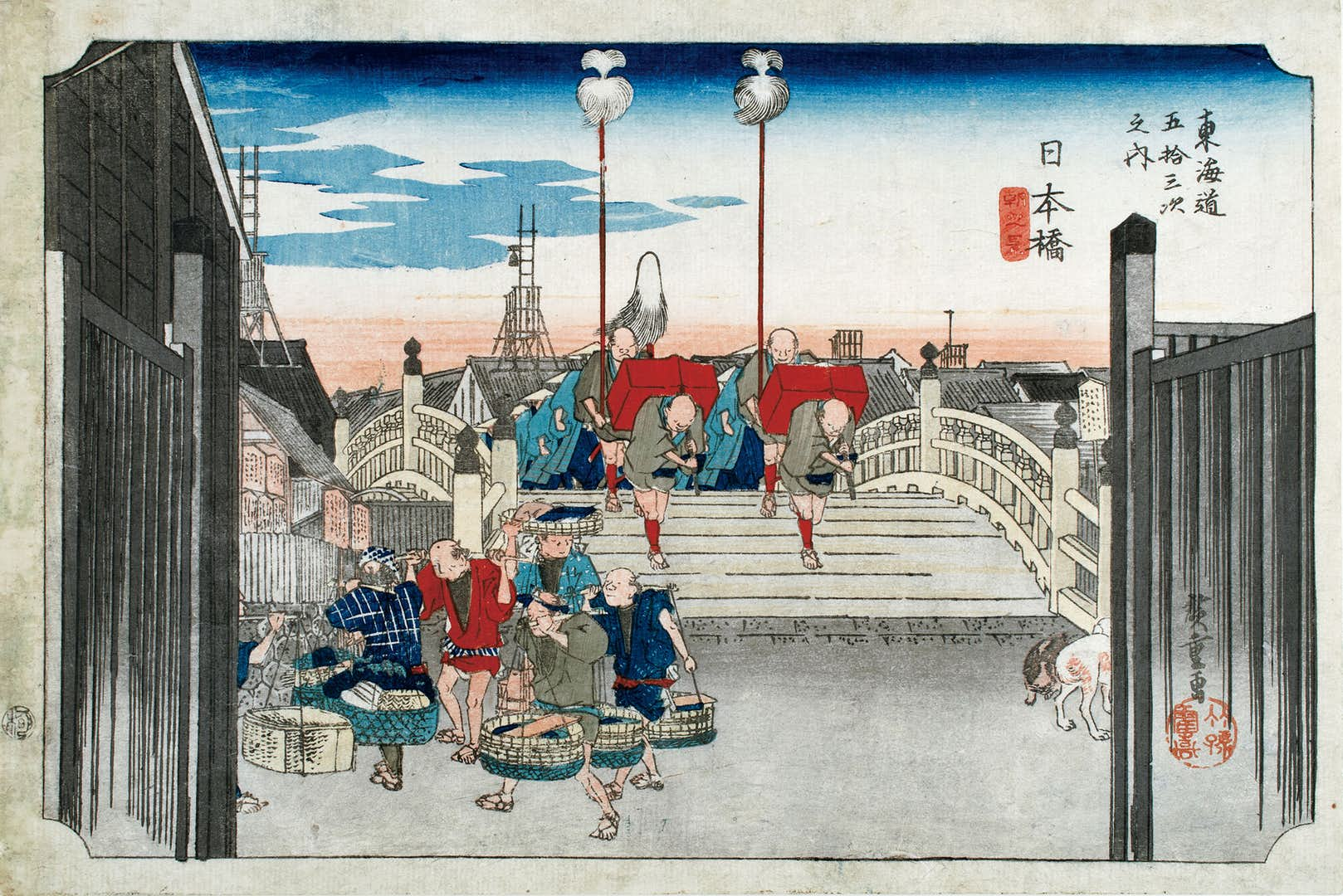
Ukiyo-e print of Nihonbashi bridge by Hiroshige (from The Fifty-three Stations of the Tōkaidō)

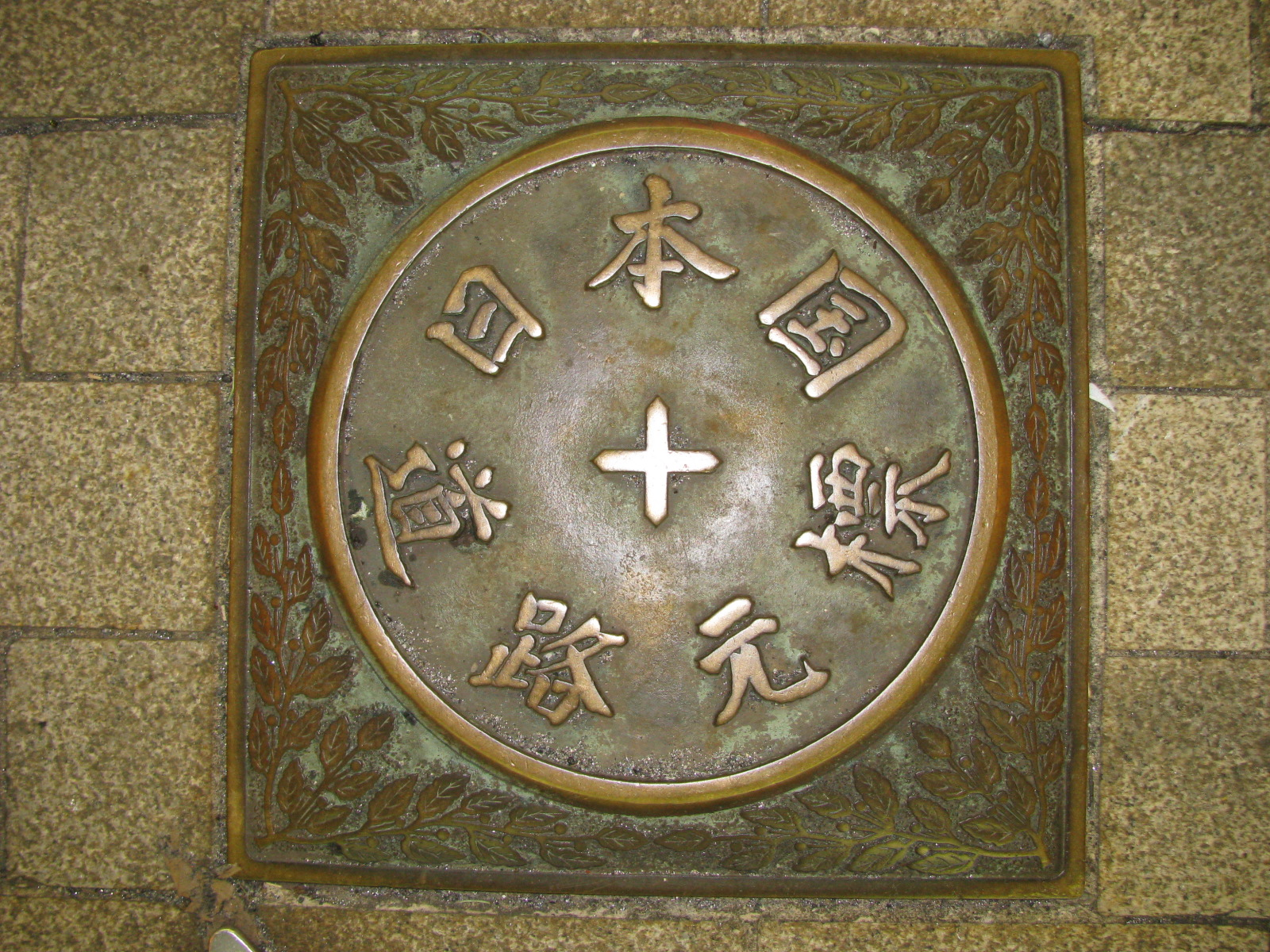
Kilometre zero is on the middle of the bridge.

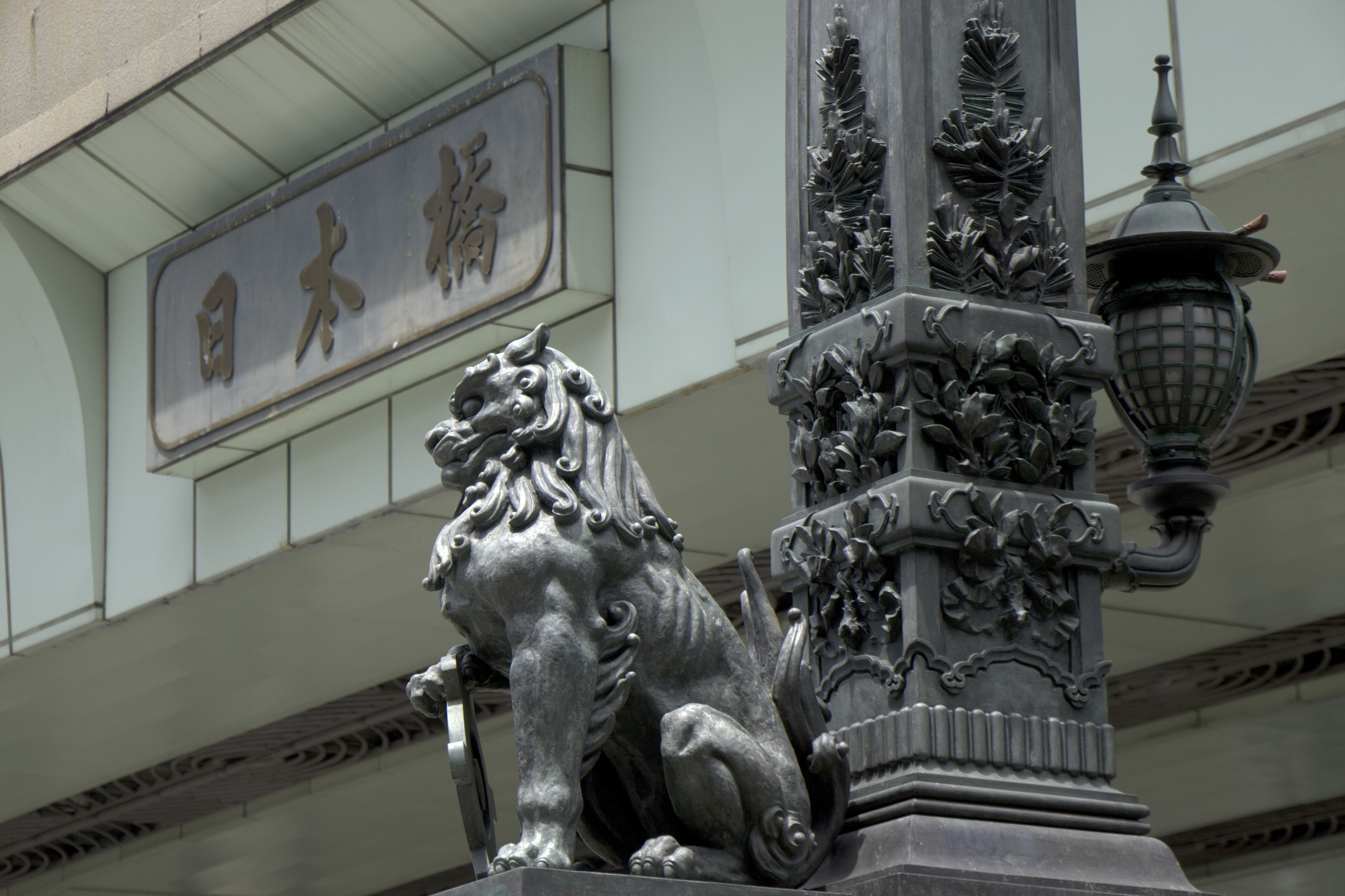
Lion on the Nihonbashi Bridge

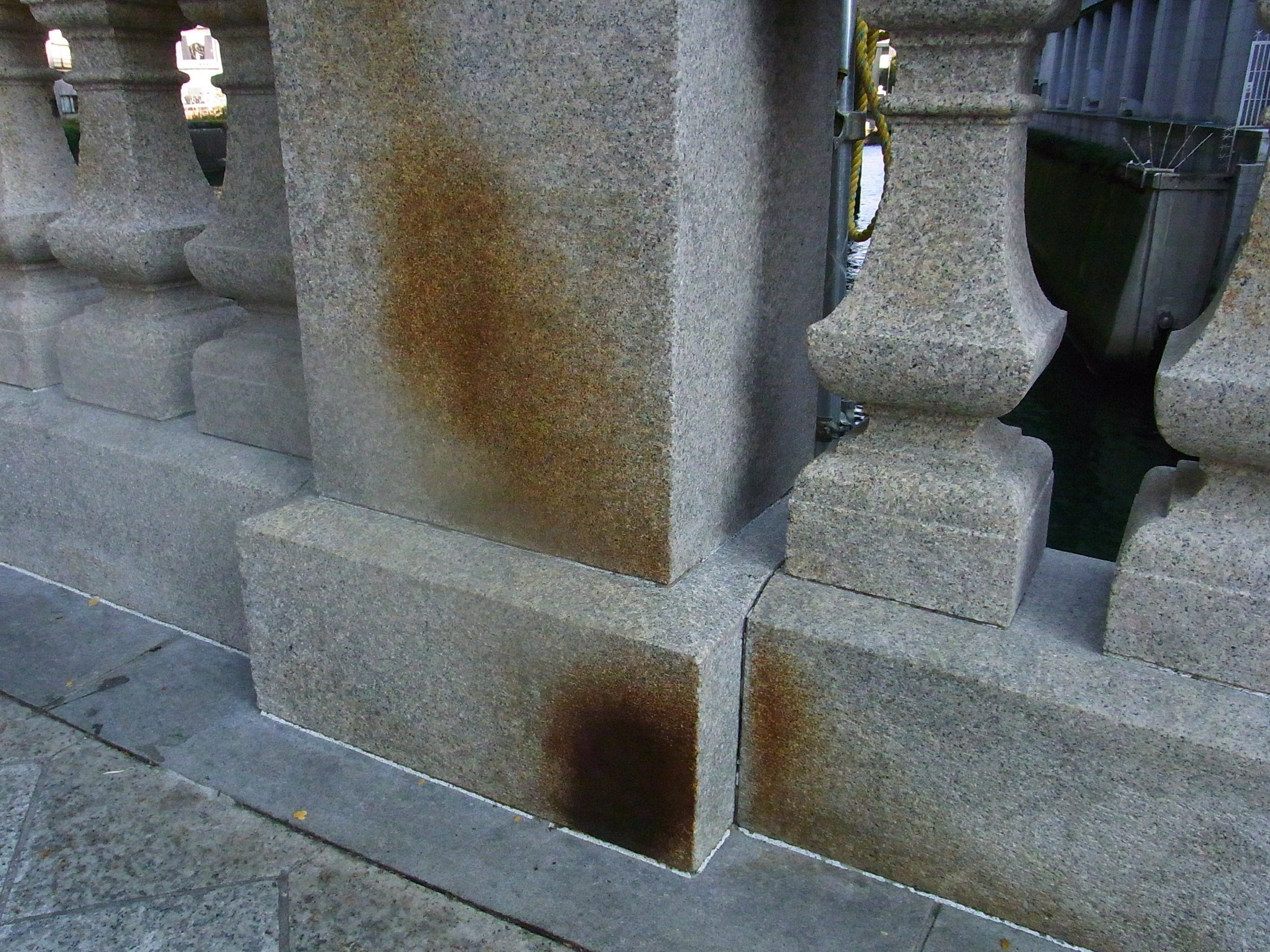
Scorch marks from American incendiary bombs on the Nihonbashi Bridge
