= Denka =

Japanese chemical company

Denka Company Limited

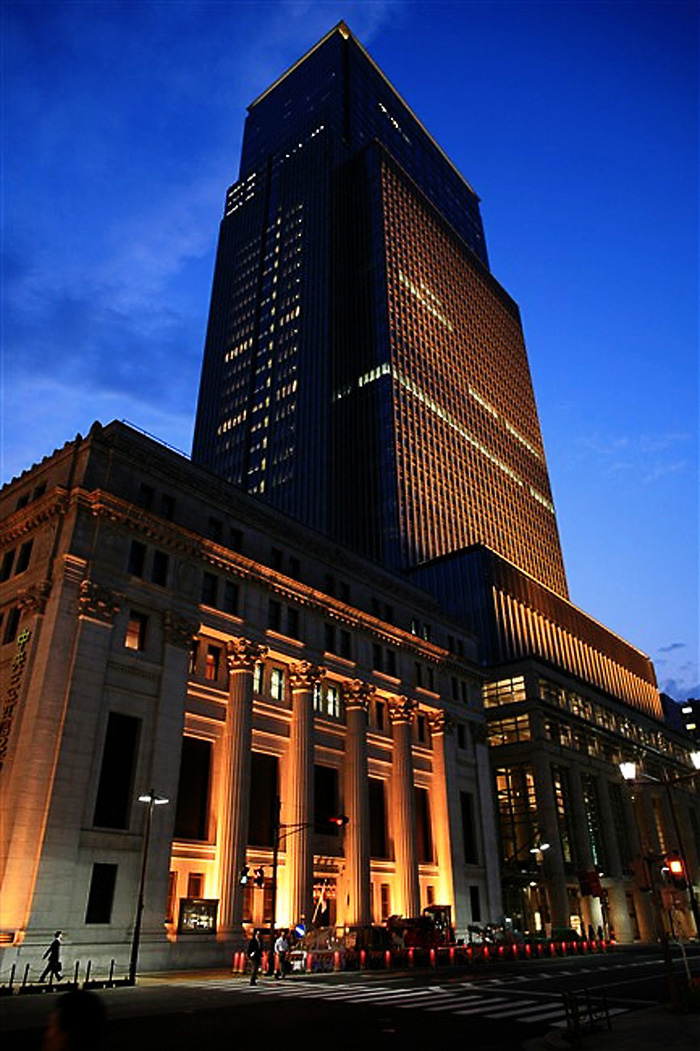
- Denka headquarters in the Nihonbashi Mitsui Tower
- Type: Public (K.K)
- Traded as: TYO: 4061; Nikkei 225 Component
- ISIN: JP3549600009
- Industry: Chemicals
- Founded: Tomakomai, Hokkaido, Japan (May 1, 1915; 111 years ago)
- Founder: Tsuneichi Fujiyama
- Headquarters: Nihonbashi Mitsui Tower, 1-1, Nihonbashi-Muromachi 2-chome, Chuo-ku, Tokyo 103-8338, Japan
- Key people: Shinsuke Yoshitaka (Chairman and CEO); Manabu Yamamoto (President)
- Products: Basic chemicals; Agrochemicals; Petrochemicals; Pharmaceuticals; Construction materials
- Revenue: ▲JPY 395.6 billion (FY 2017) (US$ 3.56 billion) (FY 2017)
- Net income: ▲JPY 23 billion (FY 2017) (US$ 207 million) (FY 2017)
- Number of employees: 5,944 (consolidated, as of March 31, 2018)
- Website: Official website

Denka Company Limited (デンカ株式会社, Denka Kabushiki-gaisha); formerly Denki Kagaku Kogyo Kabushiki Kaisha (電気化学工業株式会社) is a Japanese chemical company, established in 1915, and headquartered in Tokyo, manufacturing organic and inorganic chemicals, cement, special cement additives, electronic component transfer materials and food packaging materials. The company is listed on the Tokyo Stock Exchange and is a constituent of the Nikkei 225 stock index.

== History ==
In 1912, Tsuneichi Fujiyama founded a carbide business, Hokkai Carbide, in Tomakomai, a village in Hokkaido. One year later, Fujiyama patented his own process of producing cyanamide, the continuous cyanamide process. In 1913, Fujiyama with the help of 22 venture capitalists incorporated a reorganized Hokkai Carbide as Denki Kagaku Kogyo, the current company. Despite its legal status as an independent corporation, Denka was a Mitsui-related company. The company changed its name from Denki Kagaku Kogyo to Denka Company Limited 2015.

== Pontchartrain Works ==
DuPont constructed the Pontchartrain Works facility in Reserve, Louisiana as a adiponitrile plant in 1968, then added neoprene, and eventually exclusively produced neoprene. By 2011 DuPont was considering selling the plant as they were aware of chloroprene emissions, which are classified as "likely to be carcinogenic to humans" by the EPA. The company sold the plant to Denka in 2015, but DuPont still owns the land.

Up to 755 times the safe air value of 0.2 μg/m^{3} of chloroprene has been recorded at the fifth ward elementary school in close proximity to the plant. The cancer risk in Reserve is 1,500 times the national average and is thought to be due to chloroprene levels. Denka voluntarily agreed to reduce its emissions in 2017, though chloroprene emissions remained above the 0.2 μg/m^{3} level.

In February 2023, the US Justice Department sued Denka for violating the Clean Air Act and endangering public health. The EPA under the Biden administration created a rule to limit pollution of ethylene oxide and chloroprene in 2024. Denka's facility is the only chloroprene emitter in the US.

In March 2025, the Justice Department under the Trump administration dismissed the suit, referencing Executive Order 14151, stating it fell under diversity, equity, and inclusion and was "advancing ideological priorities".

Denka temporarily suspended operations the facility in May 2025 after reporting an "extraordinary loss" in company earnings.
