= Quick Corp =

Quick Corp.
- Native name: 株式会社QUICK
- Founded: October 1, 1971; 54 years ago
- Headquarters: Nihonbashi Mitsui Tower, Tokyo, Japan
- Revenue: 30.2 billion yen (2015)
- Owner: Nikkei; Nomura Holdings; Hitachi; Daiwa Securities Group; Japan Center for Economic Research; Mizuho Bank; The Bank of Tokyo-Mitsubishi UFJ; Mizuho Securities; Japan Exchange Group; Sumitomo Mitsui Banking Corporation
- Number of employees: 653 (2016)
- Website: corporate.quick.co.jp/en/

Quick Corp. (株式会社QUICK) (sometimes stylised "QUICK") is a financial market information vendor headquartered in Tokyo, Japan. It was founded in 1971 as Quotation Information Center K.K. (株式会社市況情報センター), and changed its corporate name to the acronym "QUICK" in 1987. Quick has four offices in Japan (Tokyo, Osaka, Nagoya and Fukuoka) as well as overseas offices in London and Hong Kong.

== Services ==
Quick developed one of the three major Japanese real-time news database services in the 1980s (along with Jiji News Wire and Nikkei Telecom).

Quick is responsible for calculating several Japanese financial market indices, including the well-known Nikkei 225 stock market index. Quick also publishes "Quick Consensus" data based on corporate earnings, and macroeconomic forecasts published by securities firms and analytics companies.

In 2016, Quick introduced AI-based technology to automatically "read" corporate news releases and instantly generate news reports based on the contents. In the same year, Quick announced a strategic equity investment in the US fintech startup Xignite, which provides cloud-based market data to financial institutions, with the goal of offering the technology to customers in Asia.
