= Bakuro-yokoyama Station =

Subway station in Tokyo, Japan

Coordinates: 35.6921°N 139.7830°E

Bakuro-yokoyama Station 馬喰横山駅

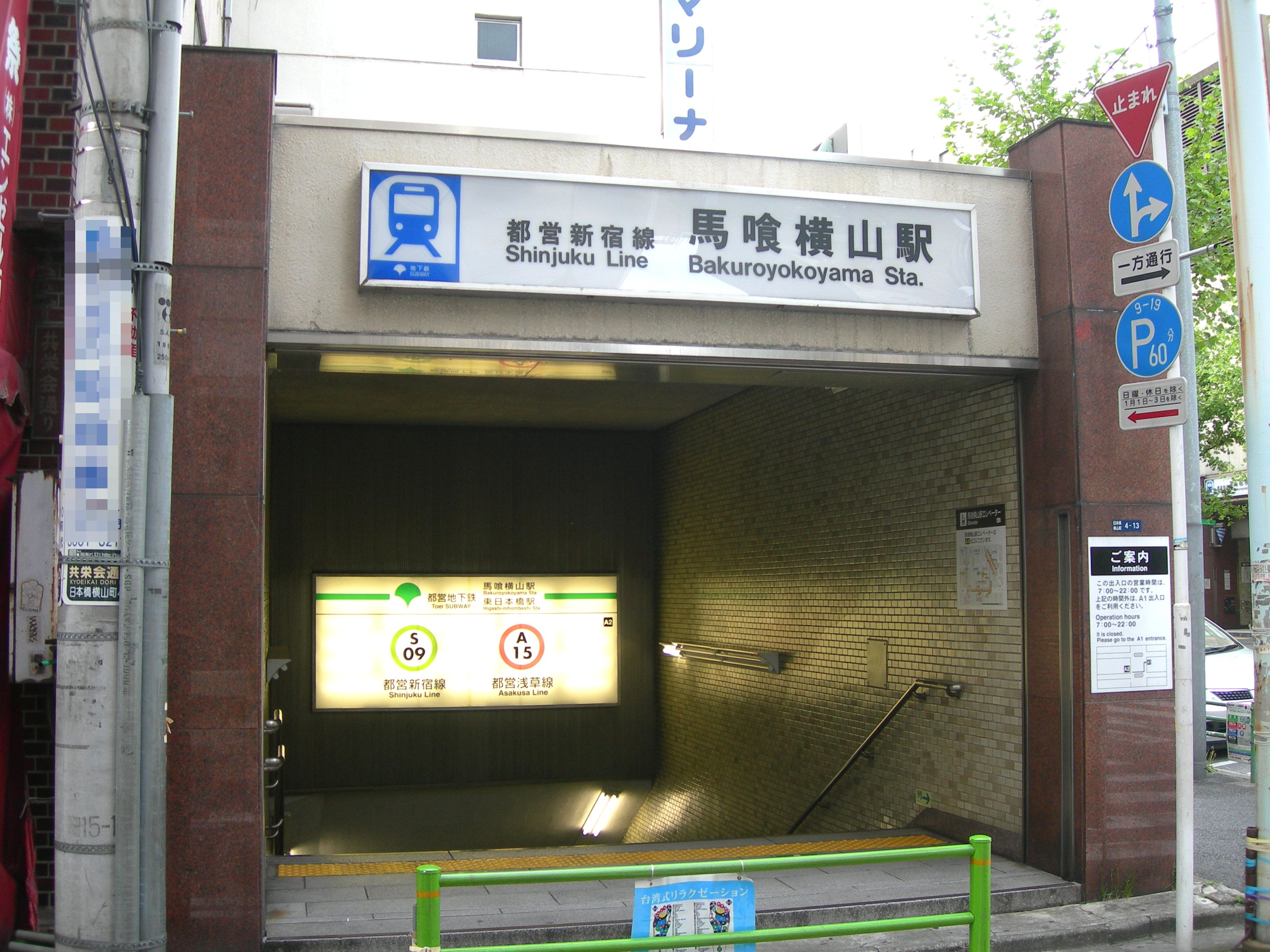
- Exit A2, May 2010

General information
- Location: 4-13 Yokoyama-cho, Nihonbashi, Chūō City, Tokyo; Japan
- Operator: Toei Subway
- Line: Shinjuku Line
- Platforms: 2 side platforms
- Tracks: 2
- Connections: Higashi-nihombashi Station; JO21 Bakurochō Station

Construction
- Structure type: Underground

Other information
- Station code: S09

History
- Opened: 21 December 1978; 47 years ago

Services
Preceding station	Toei Subway	Following station
Jimbocho towards Shinjuku	Shinjuku Line Express	Morishita towards Motoyawata
Iwamotocho towards Shinjuku	Shinjuku Line Local	Hamacho towards Motoyawata
Location
- Location within Tokyo Yamanote Loop Location within Tokyo wards area Location within Japan

Bakuro-yokoyama Station (馬喰横山駅, Bakuroyokoyama-eki) is a subway station on the Toei Shinjuku Line in Chūō, Tokyo, Japan, operated by Toei Subway.

== Lines ==
Bakuro-yokoyama Station is served by the Toei Shinjuku Line, and is located 8.1 km from the starting point of the line at Shinjuku.

== Station layout ==
The station is connected by underground passages with Higashi-nihombashi Station on the Toei Asakusa Line and Bakurochō Station on the JR Sōbu Main Line.

== Station layout ==
Bakuro-yokoyama Station consists of two side platforms.

=== Platforms ===
1	Shinjuku Line	for Jimbocho and Shinjuku; Keiō Line for Sasazuka and Hashimoto
2	Shinjuku Line	for Morishita, Ojima, and Motoyawata

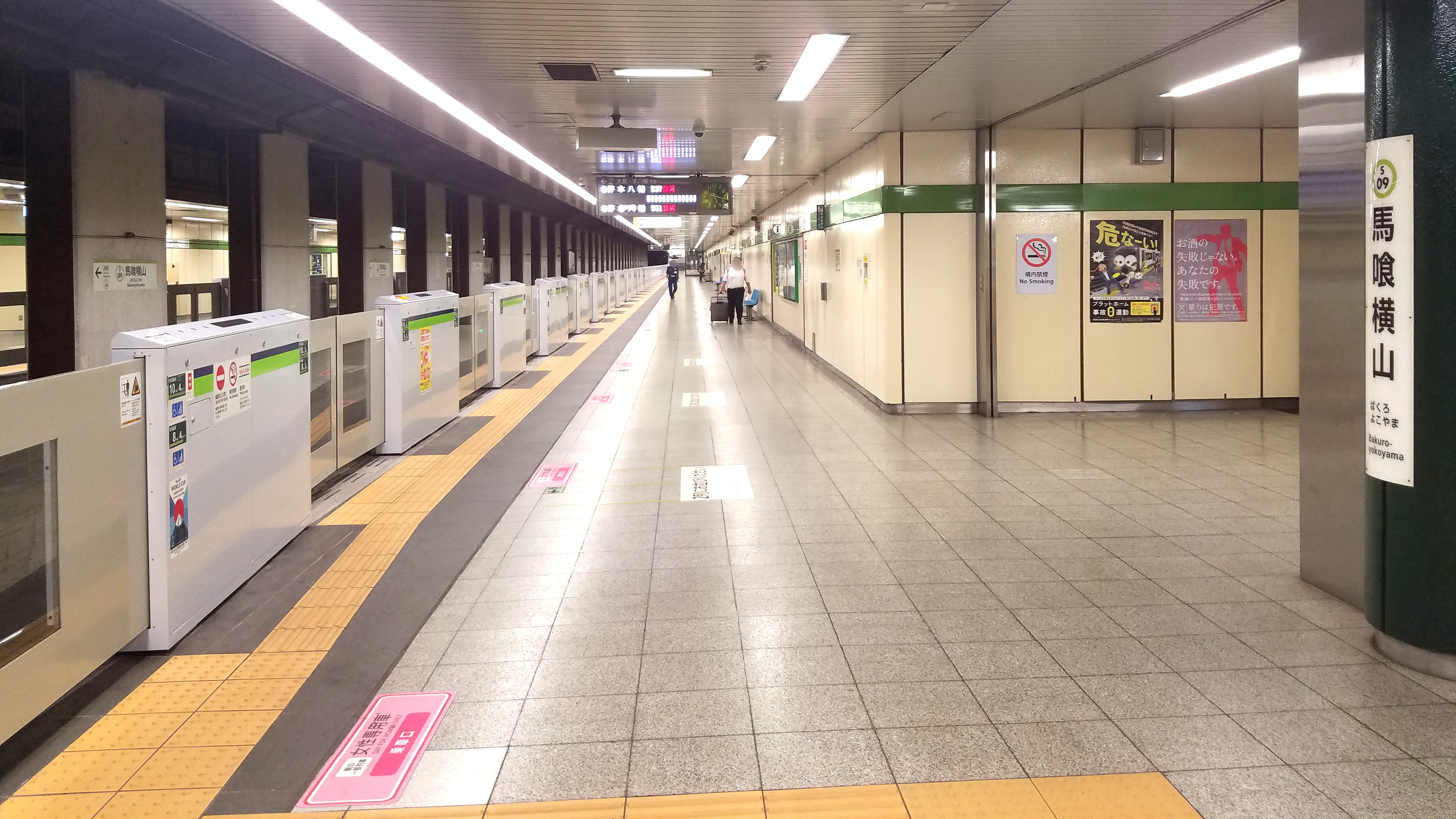
The platforms

== History ==
Bakuro-yokoyama Station opened on 21 December 1978.
