= Mandarin Oriental, Tokyo =

Hotel in Nihonbashi, Chuo, Tokyo

Coordinates: 35°41′12.86″N 139°46′23″E

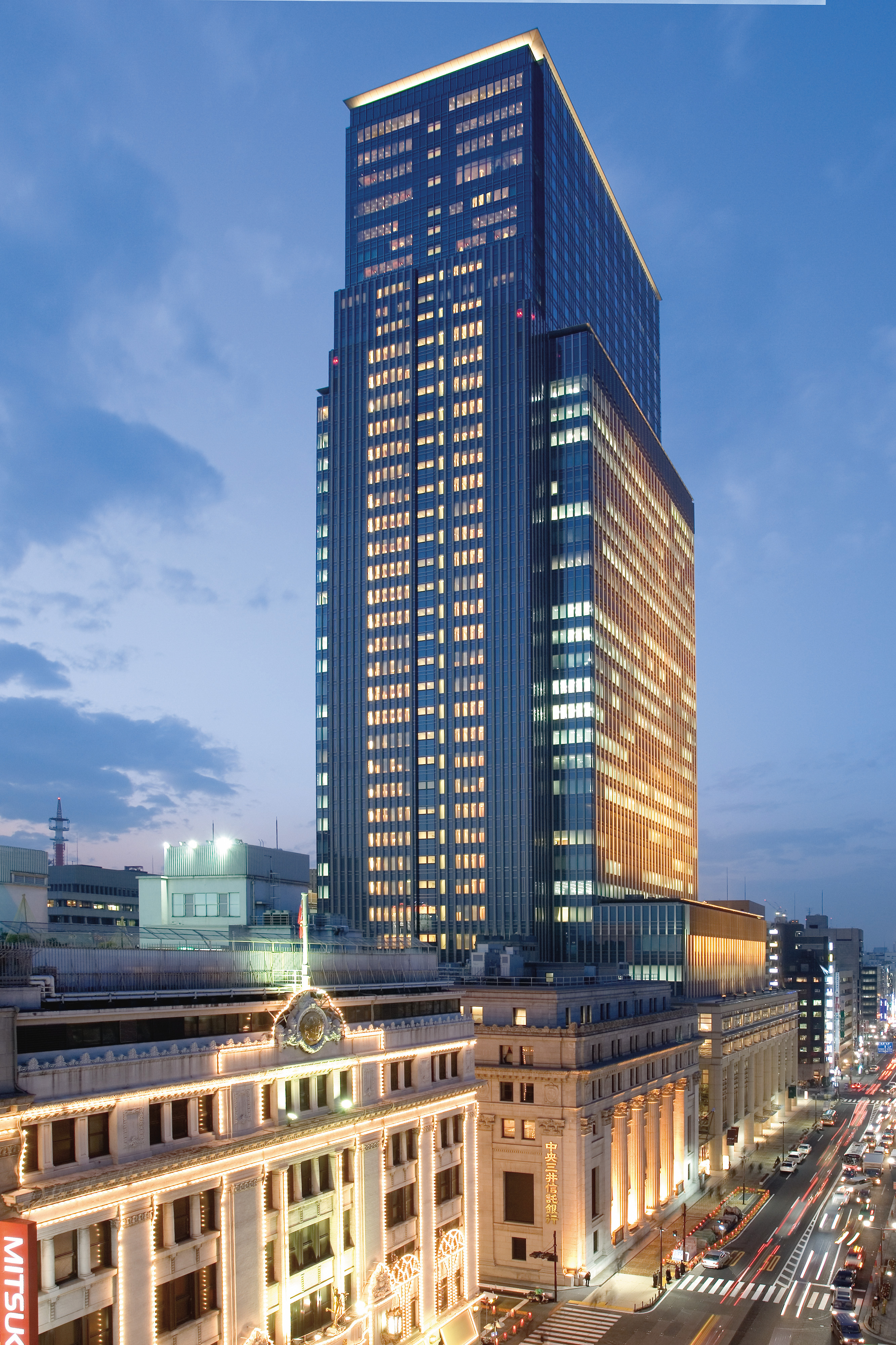
- View of the hotel in Tokyo’s Financial District
- Interactive map of the Mandarin Oriental, Tokyo area

General information
- Location: 2-1-1, Nihonbashi Muromachi, Chuo-ku, Tokyo 103-8328, Japan
- Opening: 2 December 2005; 20 years ago
- Operator: Mandarin Oriental Hotel Group

Design and construction
- Architect: Cesar Pelli

Other information
- Number of rooms: 178
- Number of restaurants: 10

Website
- http://www.mandarinoriental.com/tokyo/

Mandarin Oriental, Tokyo is a luxury hotel located in the Nihonbashi Mitsui Tower in Tokyo's Nihonbashi neighborhood, close to Tokyo Station and Tokyo Stock Exchange. The hotel, opened on 2 December 2005, is managed by Mandarin Oriental Hotel Group. The hotel contains 178 guestrooms and suites as well as ten restaurants and bars. Among the restaurants, Sense, Signature and Tapas Molecular Bar have each been awarded Michelin Stars. Additionally, the hotel operates a spa, which, in 2011, was named by Conde Nast Traveller readers as one of the Top 25 spas in the world.

== Location ==
Mandarin Oriental, Tokyo is located in Tokyo's historic Nihonbashi neighborhood.

== The Hotel ==
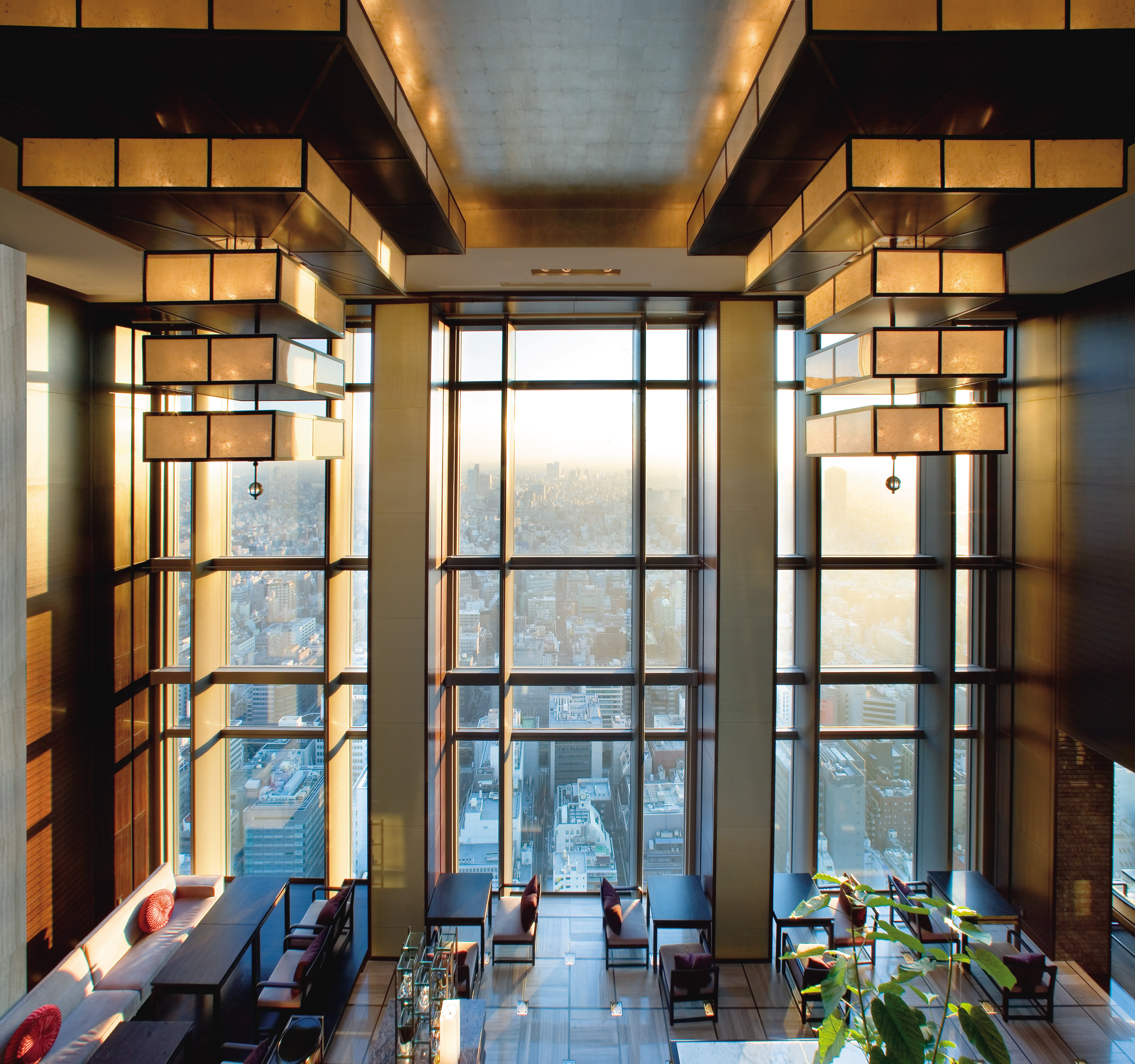
Mandarin Oriental, Tokyo: Hotel Lobby

Mandarin Oriental, Tokyo occupies the top nine floors of the Nihonbashi Mitsui Tower. The hotel's 178 guest rooms are spread across the 30th through 36th floors of the building; The Spa at Mandarin Oriental, Tokyo and several of the hotel's restaurants and bars are located on the 37th and 38th floors of the building. A very deliberate design concept governs the look and feel of the hotel with an aesthetic predicated on the themes of woods and water. To that end, "the hotel has been conceived as a single, large, living tree, with the guestrooms as branches."

The hotel houses a spa as well as numerous restaurants and bars, which include three Michelin Star restaurants. Additionally, the hotel contains a large ballroom, four banquet rooms and six meeting rooms. There is a Sanctuary Chapel at Mandarin Oriental, Tokyo as well.

Mandarin Oriental, Tokyo is a 2011 American Academy of Hospitality Sciences' Six Star Diamond award recipient and was Institutional Investor's choice for "Best Hotel in the World" in 2010.
