= Higashi-nihombashi Station =

Metro station in Tokyo, Japan

Coordinates: 35.6920°N 139.7847°E

Higashi-nihombashi Station 東日本橋駅

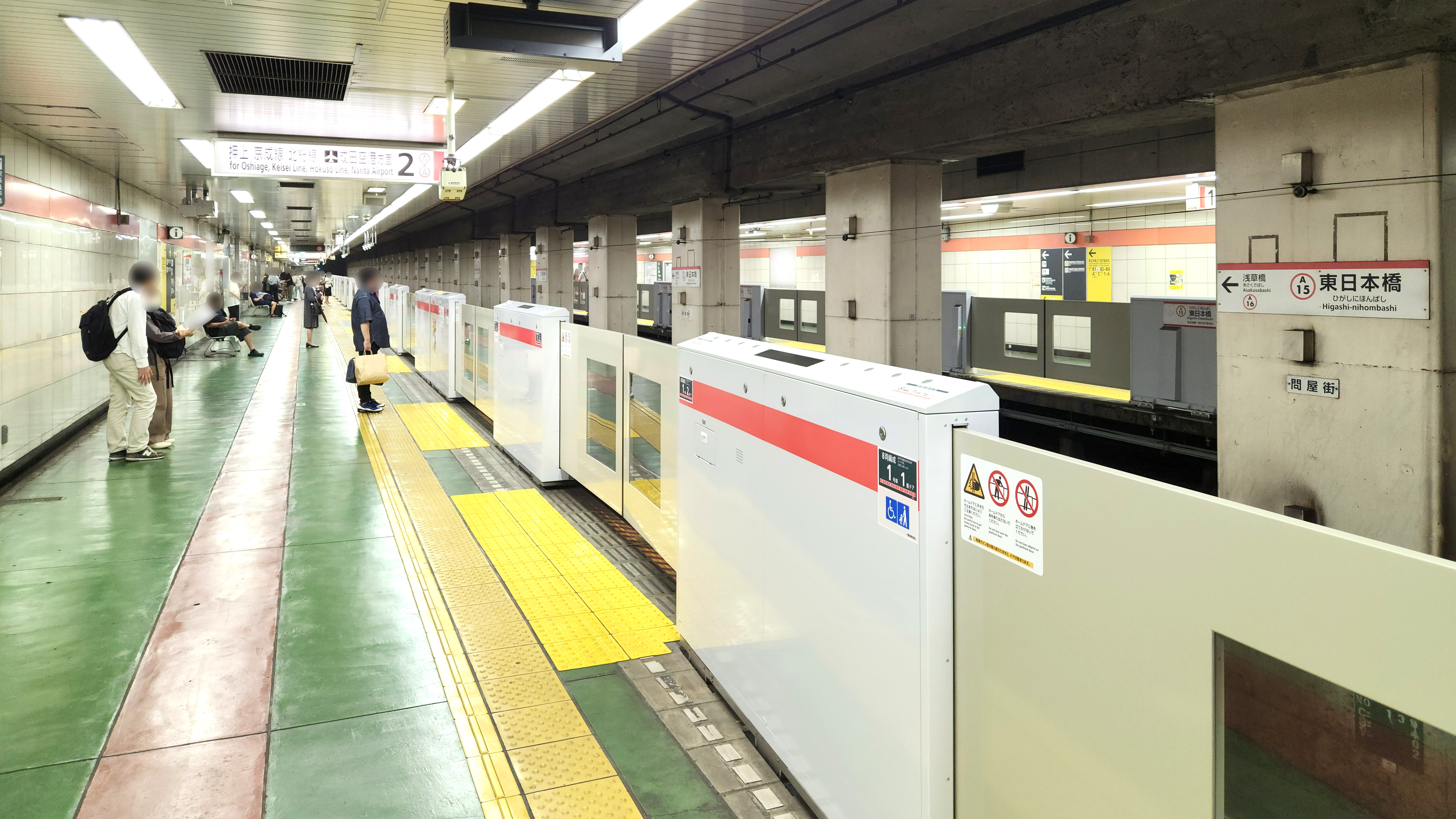
- Platforms in June 2023

General information
- Location: 3-11-8-saki Higashi-Nihonbashi, Chūō City, Tokyo; Japan
- Operator: Toei Subway
- Line: Asakusa Line
- Distance: 14.5 km (9.0 mi) from Nishi-magome
- Platforms: 2 side platforms
- Tracks: 2
- Connections: Bakuro-yokoyama Station; JO21 Bakurochō Station

Construction
- Structure type: Underground

Other information
- Station code: A-15
- Website: Official website

History
- Opened: May 31, 1962; 64 years ago

Services
Preceding station	Toei Subway	Following station
Nihombashi towards Sengakuji	Asakusa Line Airport Limited Express	Asakusa towards Oshiage
Ningyocho towards Nishi-magome	Asakusa Line	Asakusabashi towards Oshiage
Location
- Location within Tokyo Yamanote Loop Location within Tokyo wards area Location within Japan

Higashi-nihombashi Station (東日本橋駅, Higashi-nihonbashi-eki) is a subway station on the Toei Asakusa Line, operated by the Toei. It is located in Chūō, Tokyo, Japan.

== Layout ==
Higashi-nihombashi Station has two platforms serving two tracks. Track 1 is for passengers traveling toward Sengakuji and Nishi-magome Stations. Track 2 serves those heading toward Asakusa and Oshiage Stations.

1	Asakusa Line	for Sengakuji and Nishi-magome; Keikyu Main Line for Shinagawa, Haneda Airport (International Terminal and Domestic Terminal) and Misakiguchi
2	Asakusa Line	for Asakusa and Oshiage; Keisei Main Line for Aoto, Keisei Funabashi and Narita Airport (Terminal 2·3 and Terminal 1); Hokusō Line for Imba Nihon-idai; Narita Sky Access Line for Narita Airport; Shibayama Railway Line for Shibayama-Chiyoda

== Around the station ==
The station serves the Higashi-Nihonbashi, Bakuro and Yokoyama neighborhoods.

== History ==
Higashi-Nihombashi Station opened on May 31, 1962, as a station on Toei Line 1. During planning, its tentative name was Kumatsucho.

In 1978, the line took its present name.

Coverage of the PASMO smart card on all privately-operated stations in the Tokyo area started on 18 March 2007.

== Connections ==
The station is connected with two neighboring stations on other lines by underground passages:

- Bakuro-yokoyama Station on the Toei Shinjuku Line
- Bakurochō Station on the JR Sōbu Line Rapid Service
