= Shin-Nihombashi Station =

Railway and metro station in Tokyo, Japan

Coordinates: 35.6886°N 139.7746°E

JO20 Shin-Nihombashi Station 新日本橋駅
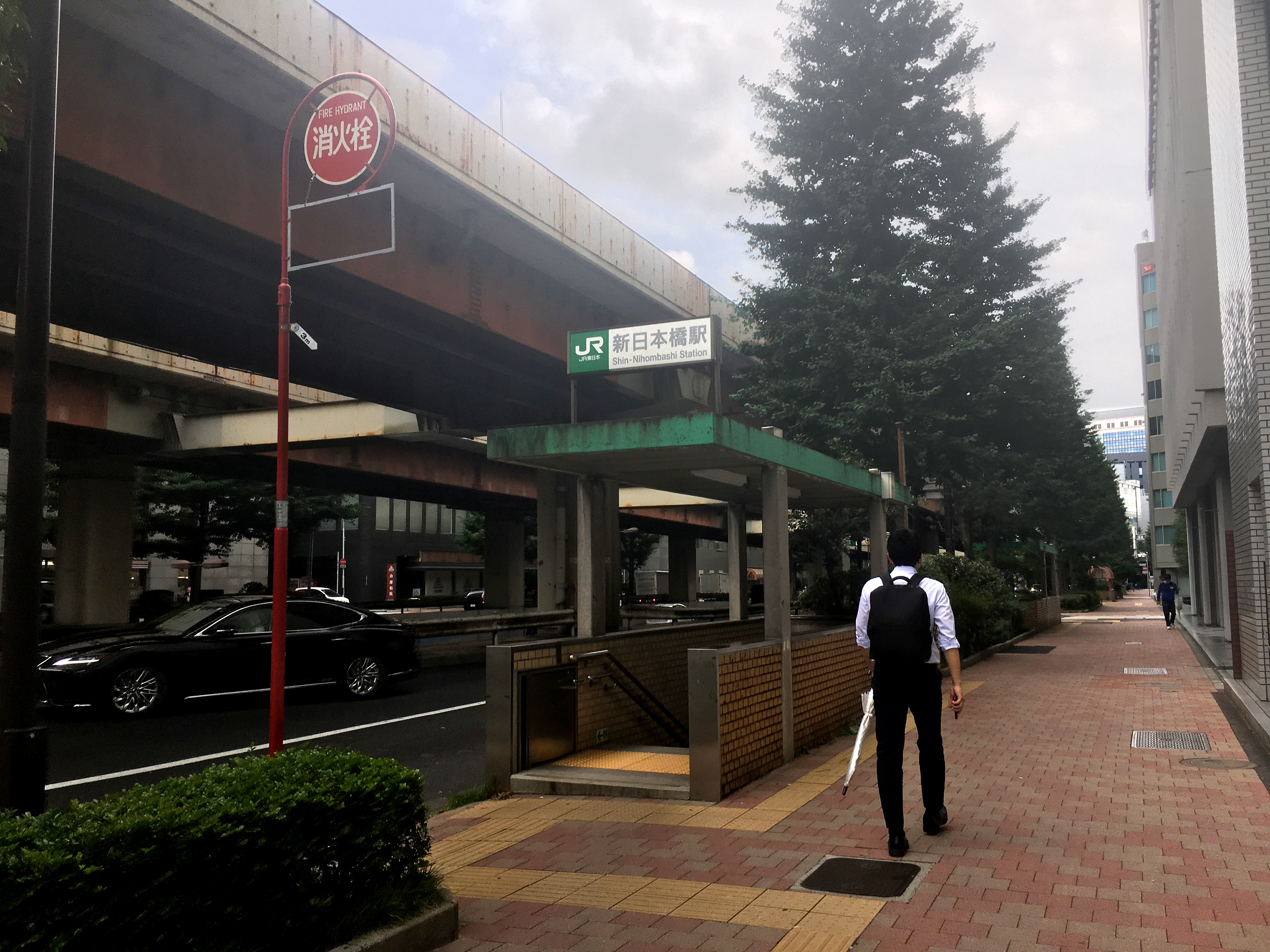
- Station entrance in 2021

General information
- Location: 4-4 Nihonbashi-Muromachi, Chuo City, Tokyo; Japan
- Operator: JR East
- Line: Sōbu Line (Rapid)
- Connections: Mitsukoshimae Station

Other information
- Station code: JO20

History
- Opened: 1972

Passengers
- 19,294 daily

Services
Preceding station	JR East	Following station
Tokyo Terminus	Sōbu Line Rapid	Bakurochō JO21 towards Chiba
Location

Shin-Nihombashi Station (新日本橋駅, Shin-Nihonbashi-eki) is a railway station in Chūō, Tokyo, Japan, operated by East Japan Railway Company (JR East).

== Lines ==
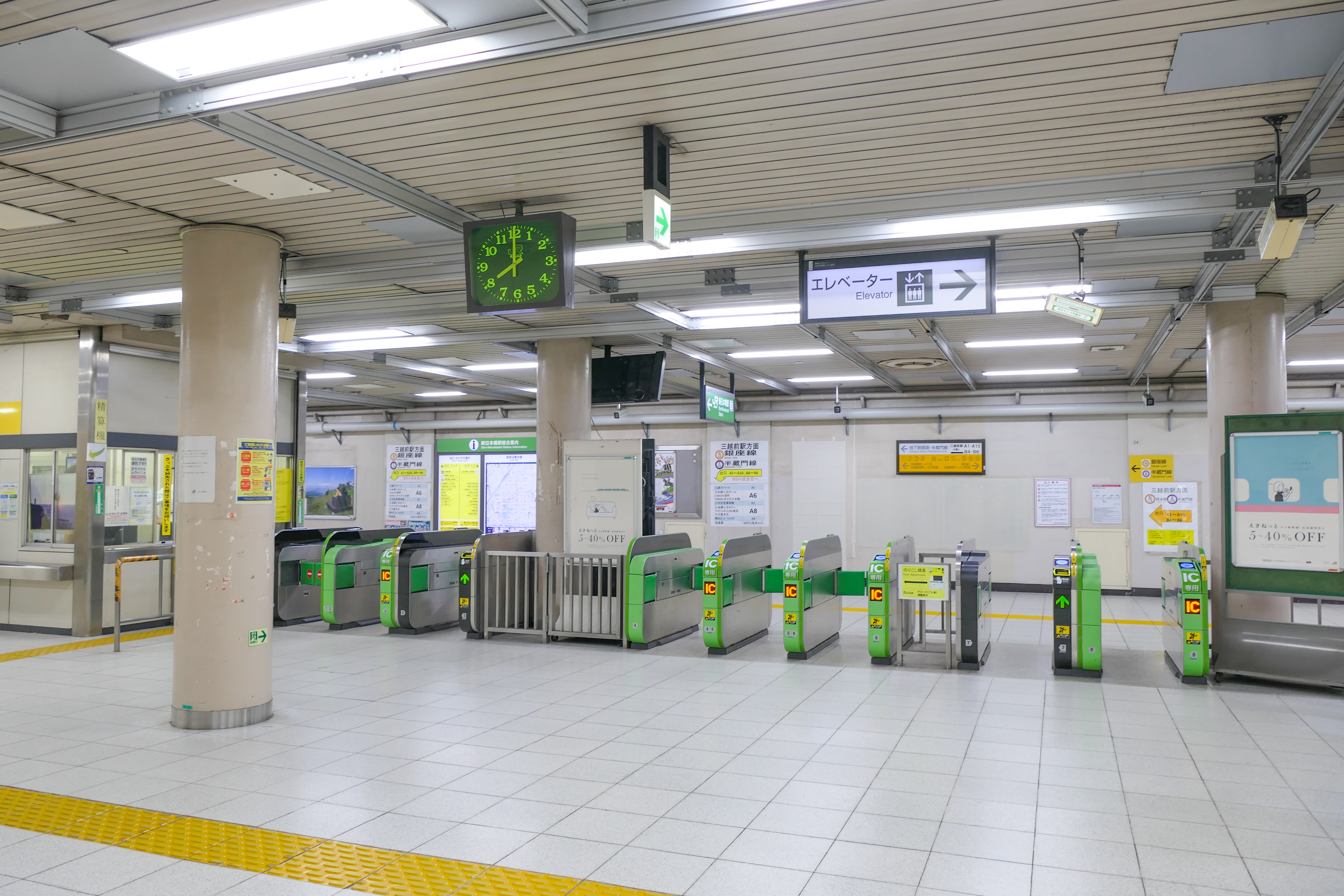
Ticket barriers in June 2022

Shin-Nihombashi Station is served by the Sōbu Line (Rapid). Passengers can transfer to the nearby Mitsukoshimae Station on the Tokyo Metro Ginza Line and the Tokyo Metro Hanzōmon Line.

== Station layout ==
The underground station has one island platform serving two tracks.

=== Platforms ===
1	Sobu Line (Rapid)	for Tokyo; Yokosuka Line for Yokohama, Ōfuna and Zushi
2	Sobu Line (Rapid)	for Tsudanuma and Chiba

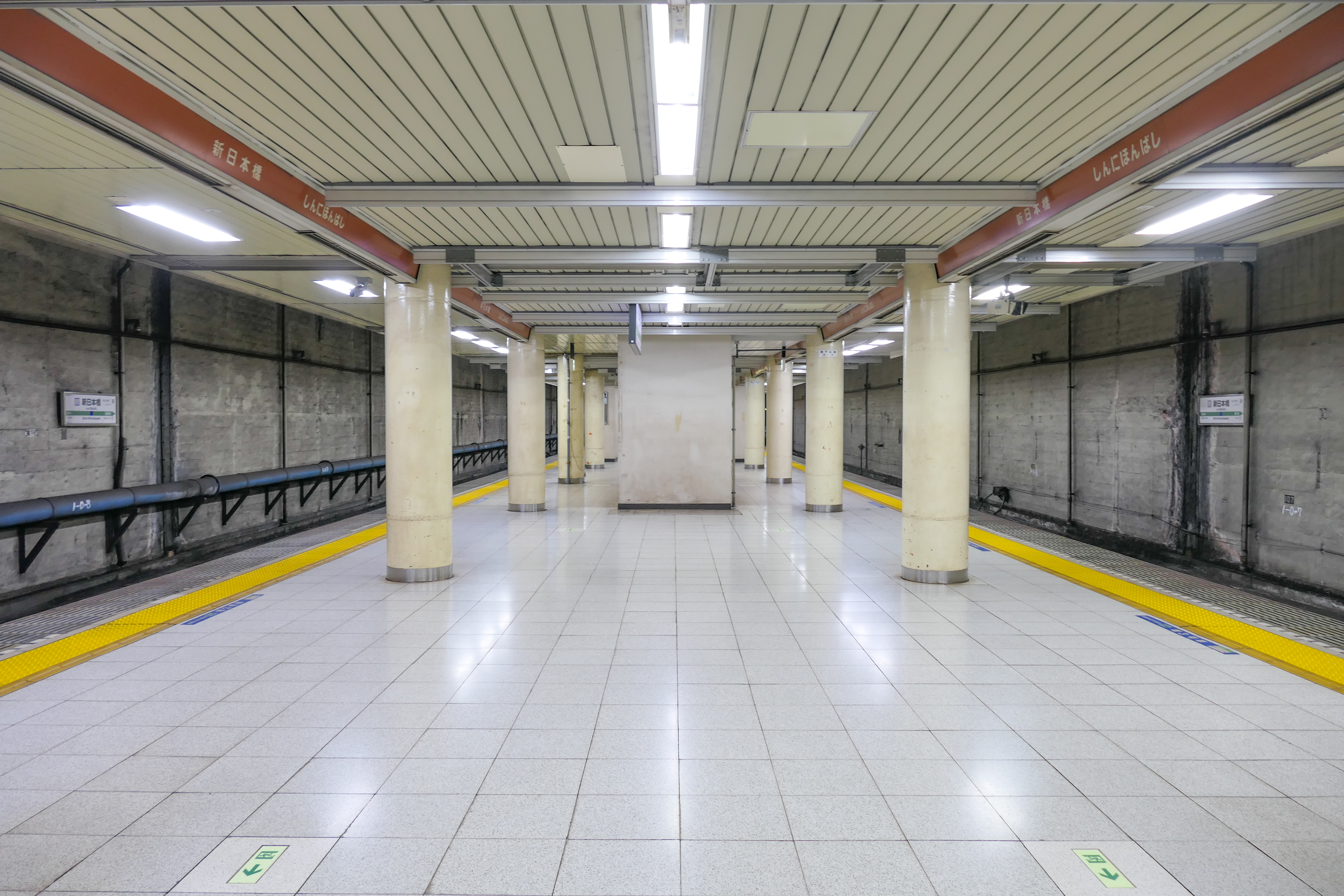
Station platforms in June 2022

== History ==
The station opened on July 15, 1972.

== Surrounding area ==
- Mitsukoshimae Station ( Ginza Line and Hanzomon Line)
