= Mitsukoshimae Station =

Metro station in Tokyo, Japan

Coordinates: 35.684551°N 139.774611°E

Mitsukoshimae Station 三越前駅

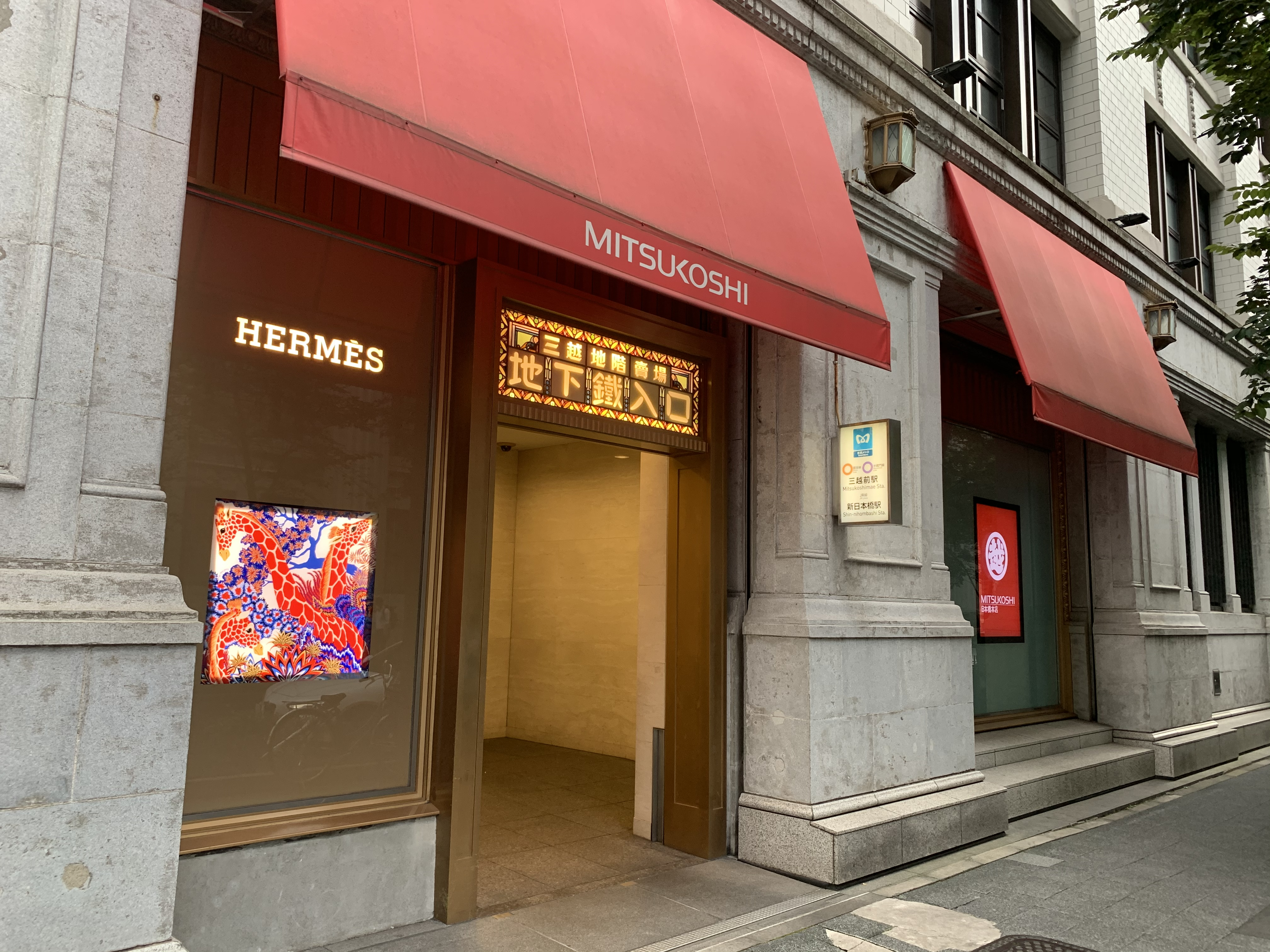
- Exit A5, September 2020

General information
- Location: 2-2-1 (Ginza Line); 1-8-1 (Hanzomon Line) Nihonbashi-Muromachi, Chuo City, Tokyo; Japan
- System: Tokyo subway
- Owner: Tokyo Metro Co., Ltd.
- Operator: Tokyo Metro
- Lines: Ginza Line; Hanzōmon Line
- Platforms: 2 island platforms (1 for each line)
- Tracks: 4 (2 for each line)
- Connections: JO20 Shin-Nihombashi Station

Construction
- Structure type: Underground

Other information
- Station code: G-12, Z-09

History
- Opened: 29 April 1932; 94 years ago

Services
| Preceding station | Tokyo Metro | Following station |
|---|---|---|
| Nihombashi towards Shibuya | Ginza Line | Kanda towards Asakusa |
| Ōtemachi towards Shibuya | Hanzōmon Line | Suitengumae towards Oshiage |
Location
- Location within Tokyo Yamanote Loop Location within Tokyo wards area Location within Japan

Mitsukoshimae Station (三越前駅, Mitsukoshimae-eki) is a subway station on the Tokyo Metro Ginza Line and Tokyo Metro Hanzomon Line, in Chūō, Tokyo, Japan, operated by Tokyo Metro.

== Lines ==
Mitsukoshimae Station is served by the Tokyo Metro Ginza Line (station number G-12) and the Tokyo Metro Hanzōmon Line (station number Z-09). Passengers can also transfer to the connected Shin-Nihombashi Station on the JR Sōbu Line (Rapid) service.

== Station layout ==
The station consists of two island platforms.

=== Platforms ===
| 1 | Ginza Line | for Ginza and Shibuya |
| 2 | Ginza Line | for Ueno and Asakusa |
| 3 | Hanzōmon Line | for Nagatachō and Shibuya; Tōkyū Den-en-toshi Line for Chūō-rinkan |
| 4 | Hanzōmon Line | for Kinshichō and Oshiage; Tobu Skytree Line for Tōbu-Dōbutsu-Kōen; Tobu Isesaki Line for Kuki; Tōbu Nikkō Line for Minami-Kurihashi |

The Japanese folk song "Oedo Nihonbashi" (お江戸日本橋, Oedo Nihonbashi) is used as the departure melody for the Ginza line platforms and the Hanzōmon line platforms in 2018.

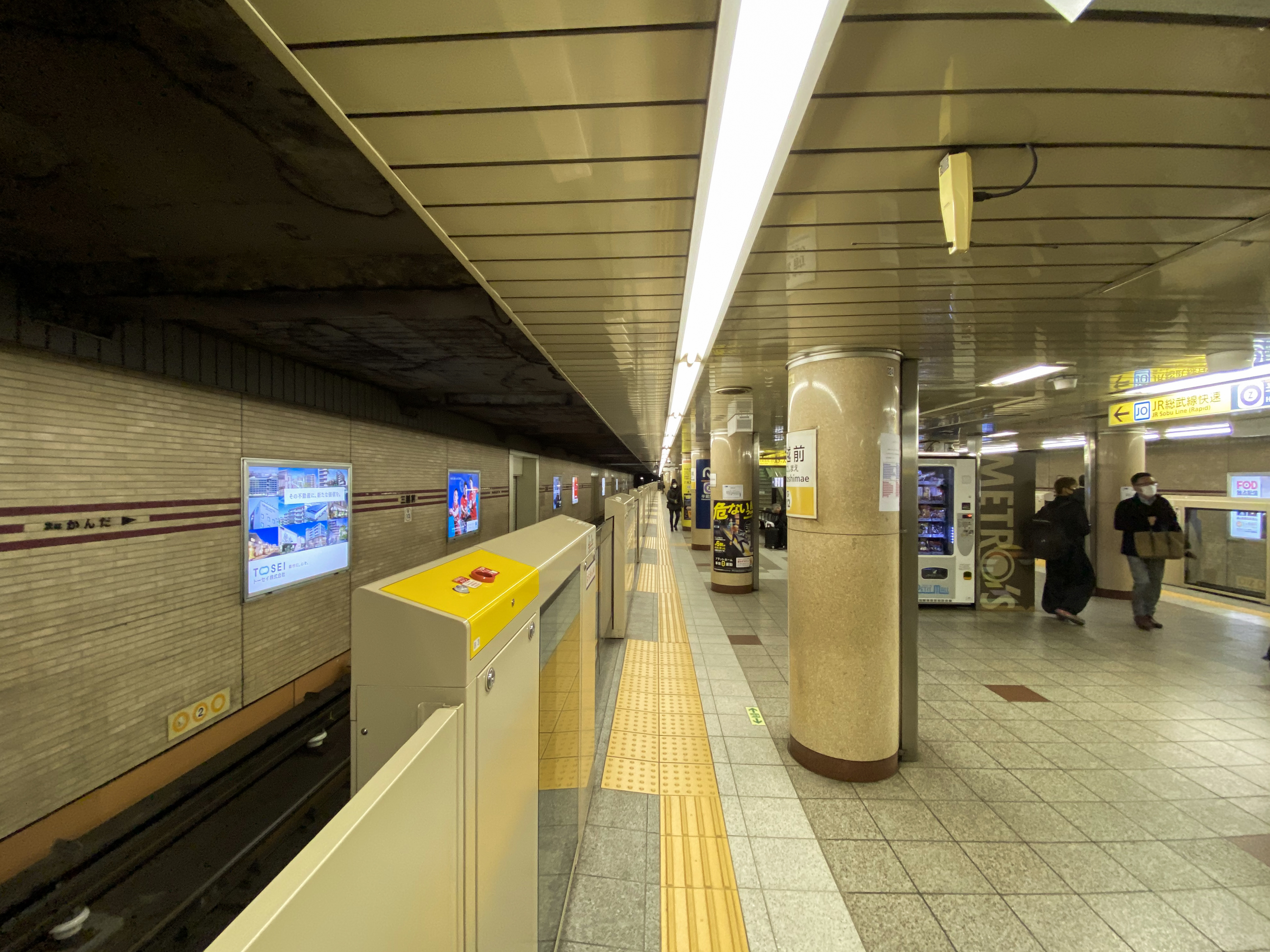
Ginza Line tracks, 2019

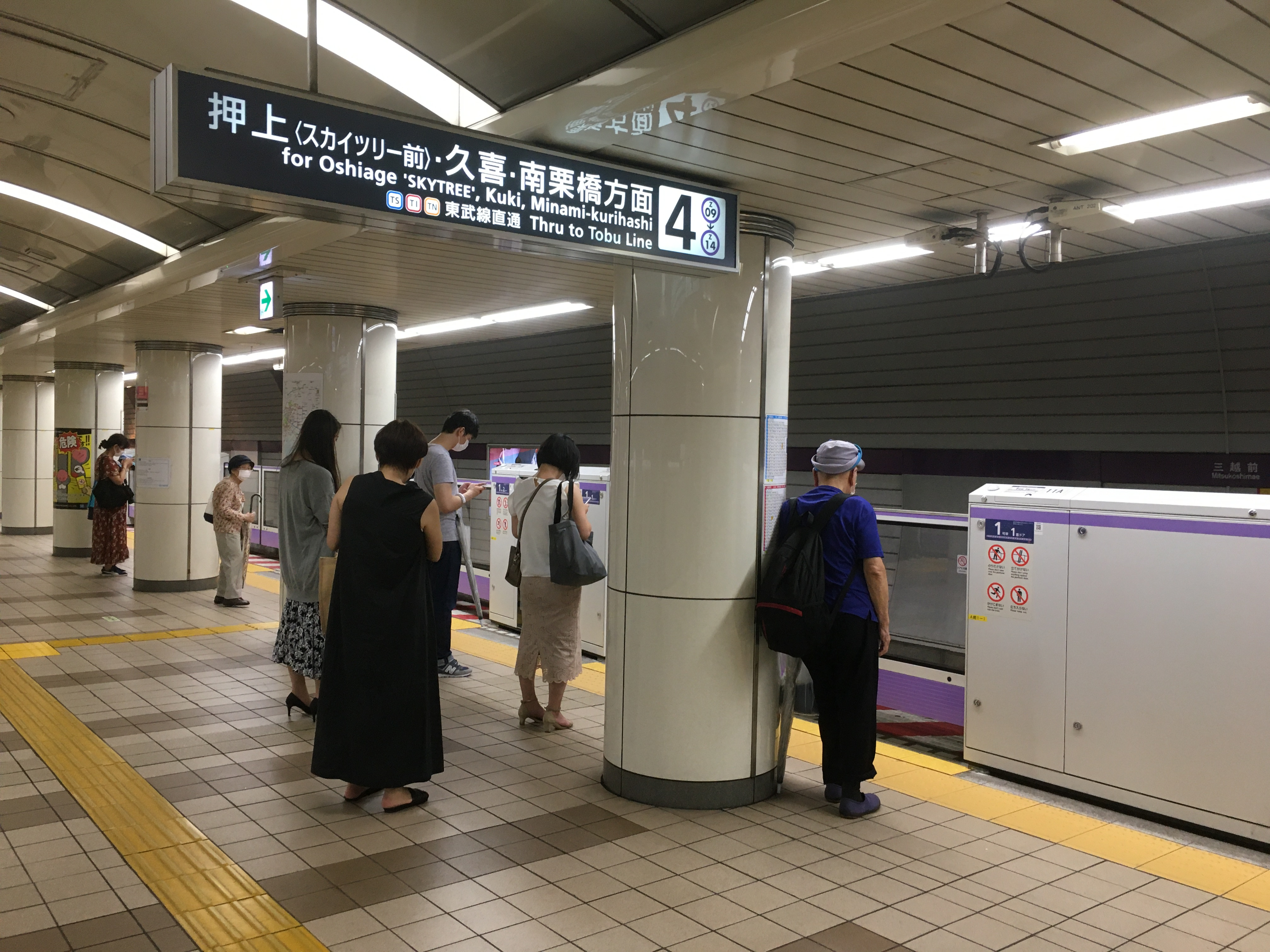
Hanzomon Line platforms, 2020

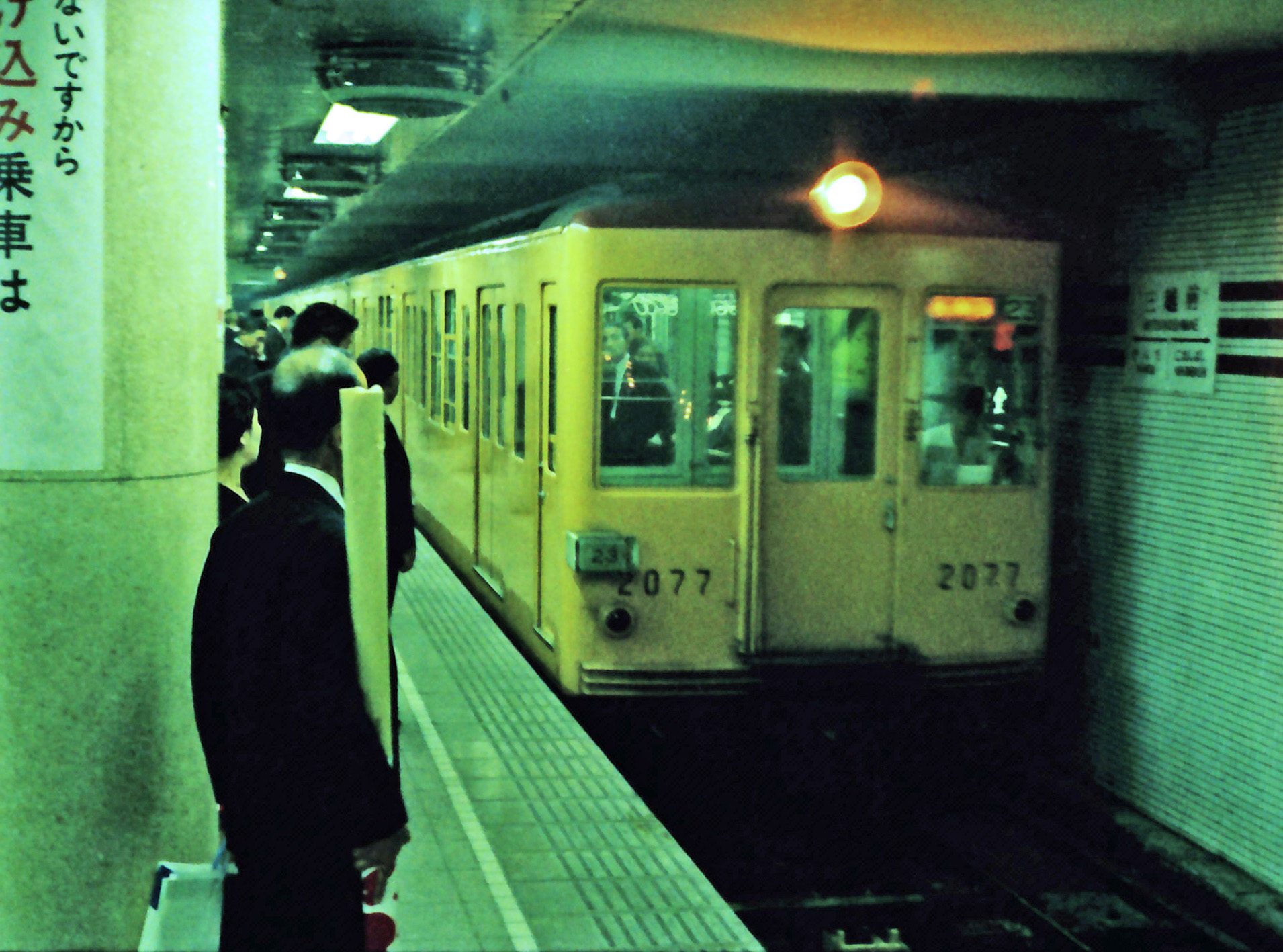
Mitsukoshimae Station in 1971

== History ==
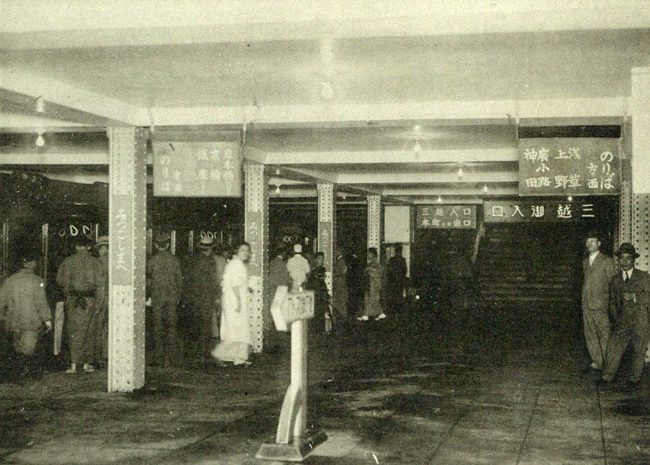
The station in the 1930s, featuring its direct connection to the Mitsukoshi Department Store entrance.

The station opened on April 29, 1932, as the southern terminus of the Tokyo Underground Railway from Asakusa. It became a through station on December 24 that year when the line was extended further to Kyōbashi. The Hanzomon Line platforms opened on January 26, 1989, as the terminus of the line from Chūō-Rinkan; they became through platforms on November 28, 1990, when the line was extended to Suitengūmae.

The station facilities were inherited by Tokyo Metro after the privatization of the Teito Rapid Transit Authority (TRTA) in 2004.

== Surrounding area ==
The station is adjacent to the Mitsukoshi Department Store and the Nihonbashi Mitsui Tower.
