= Bakurochō Station =

Railway station in Tokyo, Japan

Coordinates: 35.6943°N 139.7836°E

JO21 Bakurochō Station 馬喰町駅
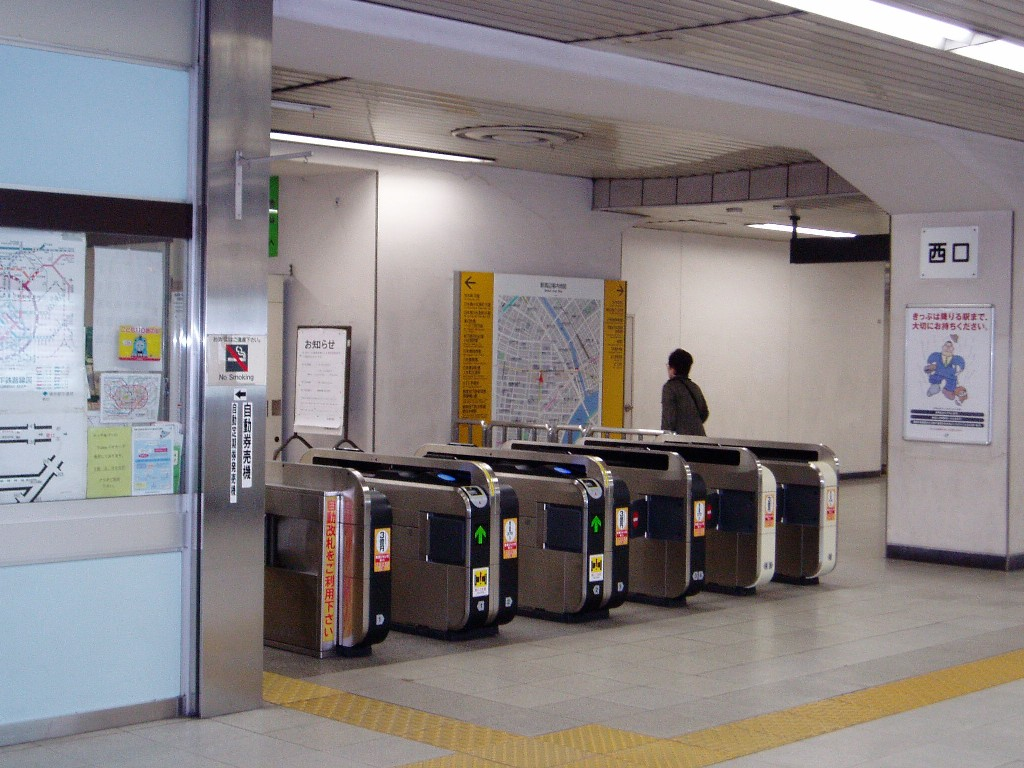
- West ticket gate

General information
- Location: Chūō, Tokyo; Japan
- Operator: JR East
- Line: Sōbu Line (Rapid)
- Connections: Higashi-nihombashi Station; Bakuro-yokoyama Station

Other information
- Station code: JO21

History
- Opened: 1972

Passengers
- 23,742 daily

Services
Preceding station	JR East	Following station
Shin-Nihombashi JO20 towards Tokyo	Sōbu Line Rapid	Kinshichō JO22 towards Chiba
Location

Bakurochō Station (馬喰町駅, Bakurochō-eki) is a railway station in Chūō, Tokyo, Japan. The station opened on July 15, 1972.

== Lines ==
- East Japan Railway Company
  - Sōbu Line (Rapid)

Passengers can transfer to:

- Higashi-nihombashi Station on the Toei Asakusa Line
- Bakuro-yokoyama Station on the Toei Shinjuku Line

== Layout ==
The underground station has one island platform serving two tracks. Track No. 1 serves up trains bound for Tokyo and No. 2 serves down trains bound for Chiba.

1	Sōbu Line (Rapid)	for Tokyo; Yokosuka Line for Shinagawa, Yokohama, Yokosuka and Kurihama
2	Sōbu Line (Rapid)	for Funabashi, Chiba and Narita Airport (Terminal 2·3 and Terminal 1)

== Surrounding area ==
- Higashi-nihombashi Station ( Toei Asakusa Line)
- Bakuro-yokoyama Station ( Toei Shinjuku Line)
- Train Hostel Hokutosei
