= Nihonbashi Mitsui Tower =

Skyscraper in Japan

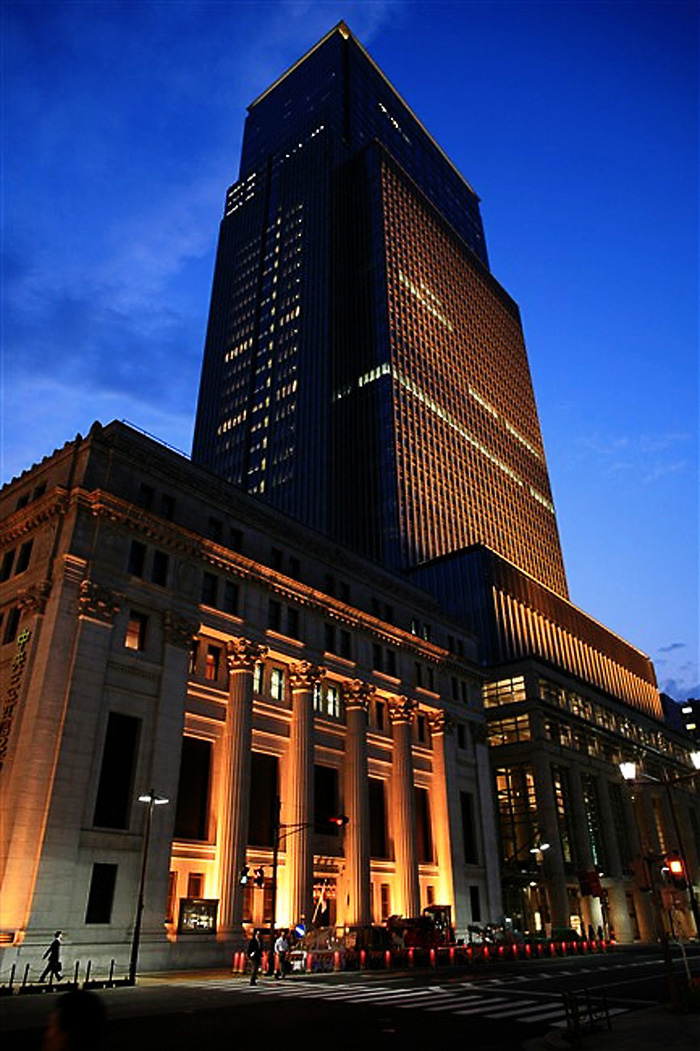
- The tower photographed at dusk in 2007; Mitsui Honkan in foreground

General information
- Status: Completed
- Type: Office and hotel
- Location: Chūō, Tokyo, Japan
- Coordinates: 35°41′13″N 139°46′23″E
- Construction started: October 2002
- Completed: July 2005
- Opening: October 2005

Height
- Roof: 194.69 metres (639 ft)

Technical details
- Floor count: 39 above ground, 4 underground
- Floor area: 133,856 m^{2} (1,440,810 sq ft)

Design and construction
- Architect: Cesar Pelli & Associates
- Developer: Mitsui Fudosan
- Structural engineer: Nihon Sekkei

The Nihonbashi Mitsui Tower (日本橋三井タワー) is a skyscraper located in Chūō, Tokyo, Japan. The 192-metre, 34-storey building is primarily used for office space with the upper floors occupied by a hotel. Its construction was completed in 2005. It is connected by an underground concourse to the Tokyo Metro Mitsukoshimae Station.

== History ==
The tower is located next to Mitsui Honkan, the historical headquarters of the Mitsui conglomerate, designed by Trowbridge & Livingston and built in 1929. Mitsui Honkan was designated as an Important Cultural Property in 1998, and the Mitsui Tower project was subsequently designed and built in a complementary style. This is most visible in the exterior design of the lower levels of the tower. Mitsui Honkan was refurbished alongside the construction of Mitsui Tower, and now houses the Mitsui Memorial Museum in addition to a branch of Sumitomo Mitsui Banking Corporation.

The tower site itself was previously occupied by Sembikiya (千疋屋), an importer and retailer of high-end fruits. Sembikiya established its headquarters on the site in 1867, a three-story Western-style building which was replaced by a more modern 11-story office building in 1971. Sembikiya moved its headquarters in 2002; the main Sembikiya store now occupies the lower level of the tower while corporate offices are located across the street.

== Tenants ==
=== Office tenants ===
- Chugai Pharmaceutical Co. headquarters
- Denka headquarters
- Mitsui Fudosan (official headquarters in Mitsui Honkan)
- QUICK headquarters
- Toray Industries headquarters

=== Mandarin Oriental ===
The upper floors of the building, as well as some lobby space and lower-level ballrooms, are occupied by the Mandarin Oriental Tokyo.
