= Ōtemachi Station (Tokyo) =

Metro station in Tokyo, Japan

Coordinates: 35.684699°N 139.765964°E

Ōtemachi Station 大手町駅

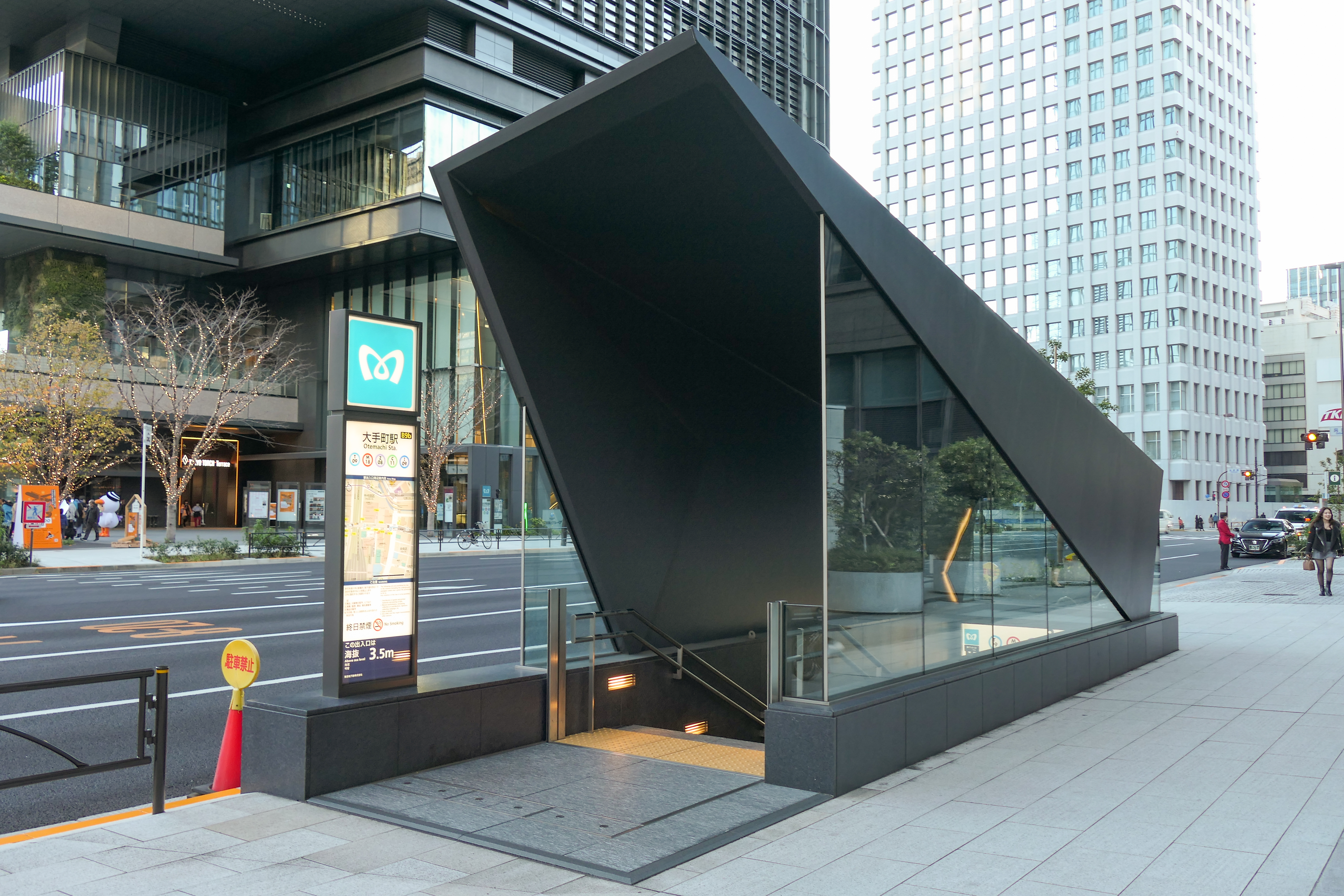
- Ōtemachi Station Entrance

General information
- Location: Chiyoda, Tokyo; Japan
- System: Tokyo subway
- Owner: Tokyo Metro Co., Ltd. Tokyo Metropolitan Government
- Operator: Tokyo Metro; Toei Subway
- Platforms: 2 side platforms (Marunouchi Line); 4 island platforms (Chiyoda/Mita/Tozai/Hanzomon lines)
- Tracks: 10

Construction
- Structure type: Underground

Other information
- Station code: C-11 (Chiyoda Line); I-09 (Mita Line); M-18 (Marunouchi Line); T-09 (Tozai Line); Z-08 (Hanzomon Line)

History
- Opened: 20 July 1956; 70 years ago

Passengers
- FY2024: 334,541 daily (Tokyo Metro); 61,653 daily (Toei Subway)

Services
Preceding station	Tokyo Metro	Following station
Takebashi towards Nakano	Tōzai Line Rapid Commuter Rapid Local	Nihombashi towards Nishi-Funabashi
Tokyo towards Ogikubo or Hōnanchō	Marunouchi Line	Awajichō towards Ikebukuro
Jimbōchō towards Shibuya	Hanzōmon Line	Mitsukoshimae towards Oshiage
Kasumigaseki towards Hakone-Yumoto, Gotemba or Katase-Enoshima	Romancecar	Kita-Senju Terminus
Nijubashimae towards Yoyogi-Uehara	Chiyoda Line	Shin-ochanomizu towards Kita-Ayase
Preceding station	Toei Subway	Following station
Hibiya towards Meguro	Mita Line	Jimbōchō towards Nishi-takashimadaira
Location
- Location within Tokyo Yamanote Loop Location within Tokyo wards area Location within Japan

Ōtemachi Station (大手町駅, Ōtemachi-eki) is a major subway station in Chiyoda, Tokyo, Japan, jointly operated by Tokyo Metro and Toei Subway. It is served by five lines, more than any other station on the Tokyo underground network, and is thus the biggest subway station in Tokyo. It is Tokyo Metro's second busiest station, after Ikebukuro.

Ōtemachi Station is within walking distance (either at street level or via underground passages) of Tokyo Station.

== Lines ==
- Tokyo Metro
  - Tōzai Line
  - Marunouchi Line
  - Hanzōmon Line
  - Chiyoda Line
- Toei Subway
  - Mita Line

== Station layout ==
=== Tokyo Metro ===
1	Marunouchi Line	for Ginza, Shinjuku, and Ogikubo
2	Marunouchi Line	for Ochanomizu and Ikebukuro
3	Tōzai Line	for Nishi-Funabashi; Sōbu Line (Local) for Tsudanuma; Tōyō Rapid Railway Line for Tōyō-Katsutadai
4	Tōzai Line	for Takadanobaba and Nakano; Chūō Line (Local) for Mitaka
5	Chiyoda Line	for Kasumigaseki and Yoyogi-Uehara; Odakyū Odawara Line for Hon-Atsugi and Isehara
6	Chiyoda Line	for Shin-ochanomizu, Kita-Senju, Ayase, and Kita-Ayase; Jōban Line (Local) for Abiko and Toride
7	Hanzōmon Line	for Kudanshita and Shibuya; Tokyu Den-en-toshi Line for Chuo-rinkan
8	Hanzōmon Line	for Kinshicho and Oshiage; Tobu Skytree Line for Tōbu-dōbutsu-kōen; Tobu Isesaki Line for Kuki; Tōbu Nikkō Line for Minami-Kurihashi

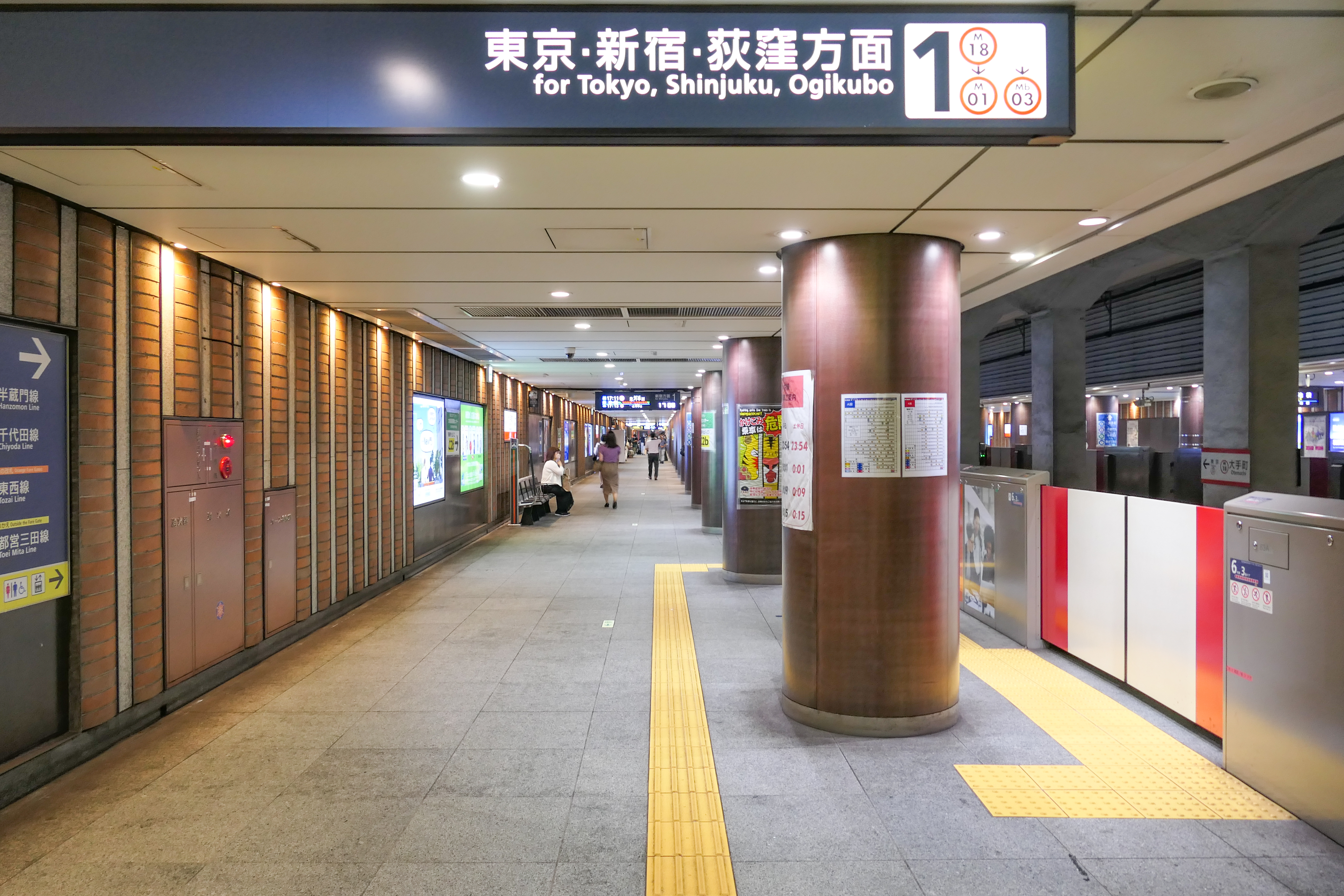
Marunouchi Line platform 1 (July 2022)

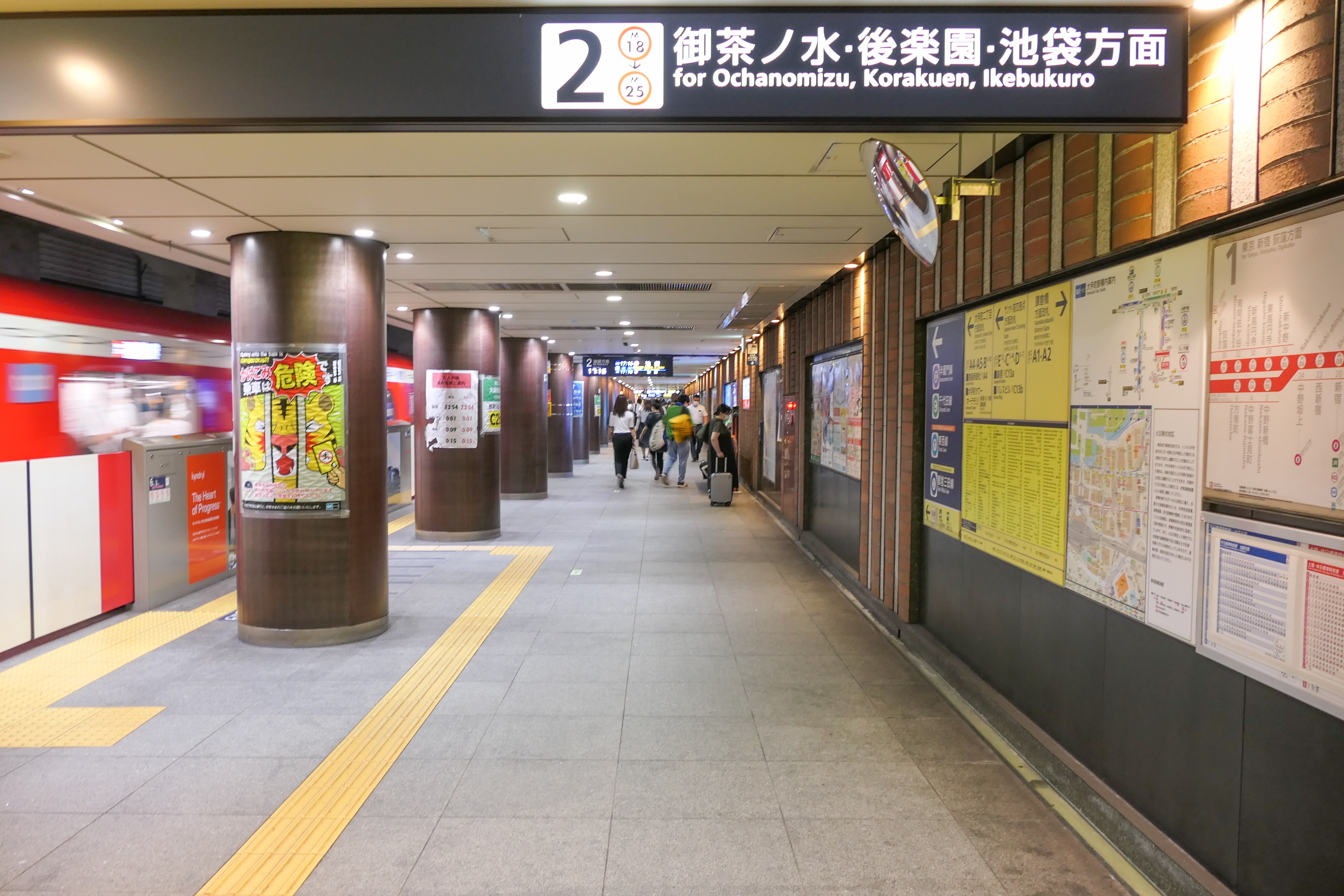
Marunouchi Line platform 2 (July 2022)

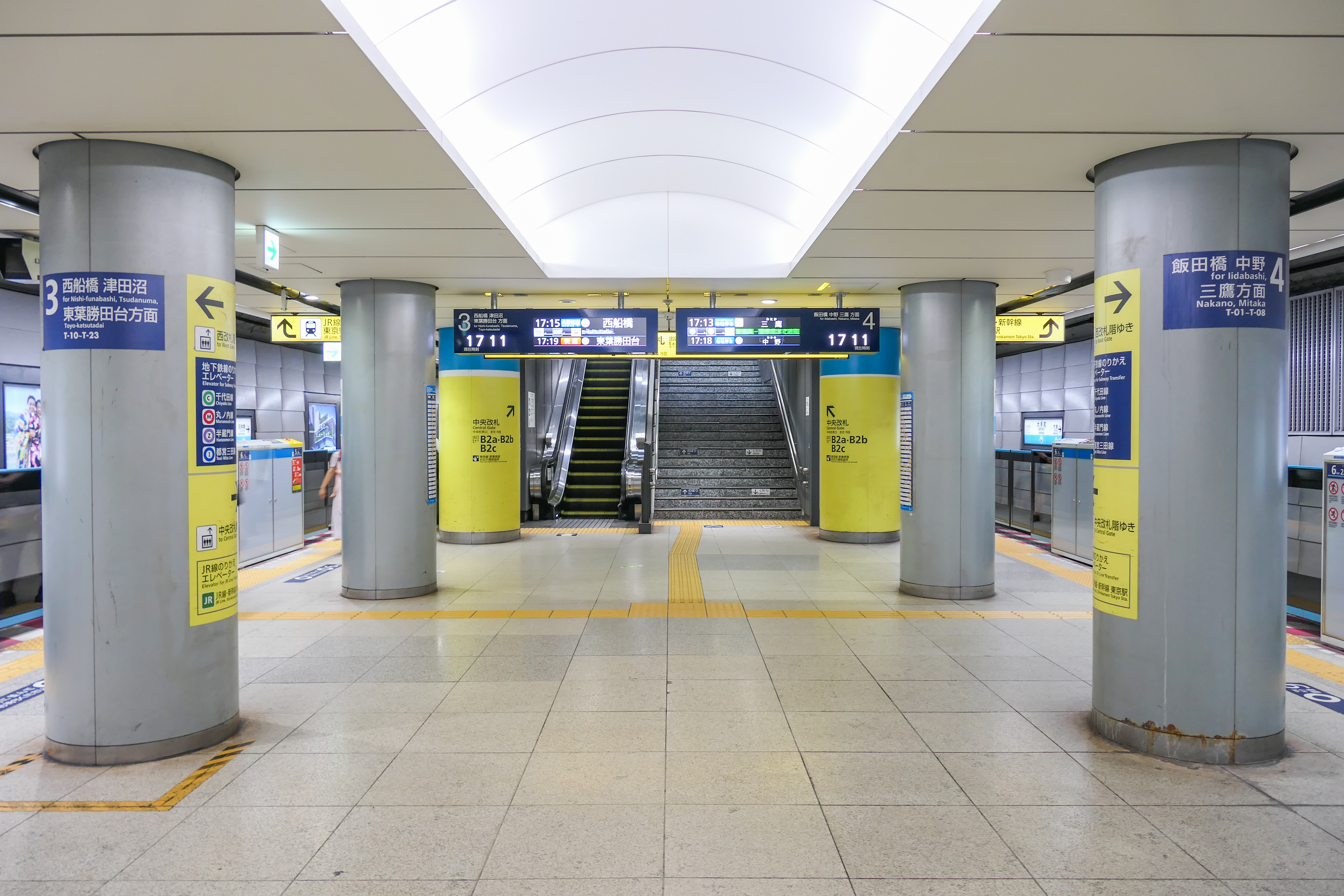
Tozai Line platform (July 2022)

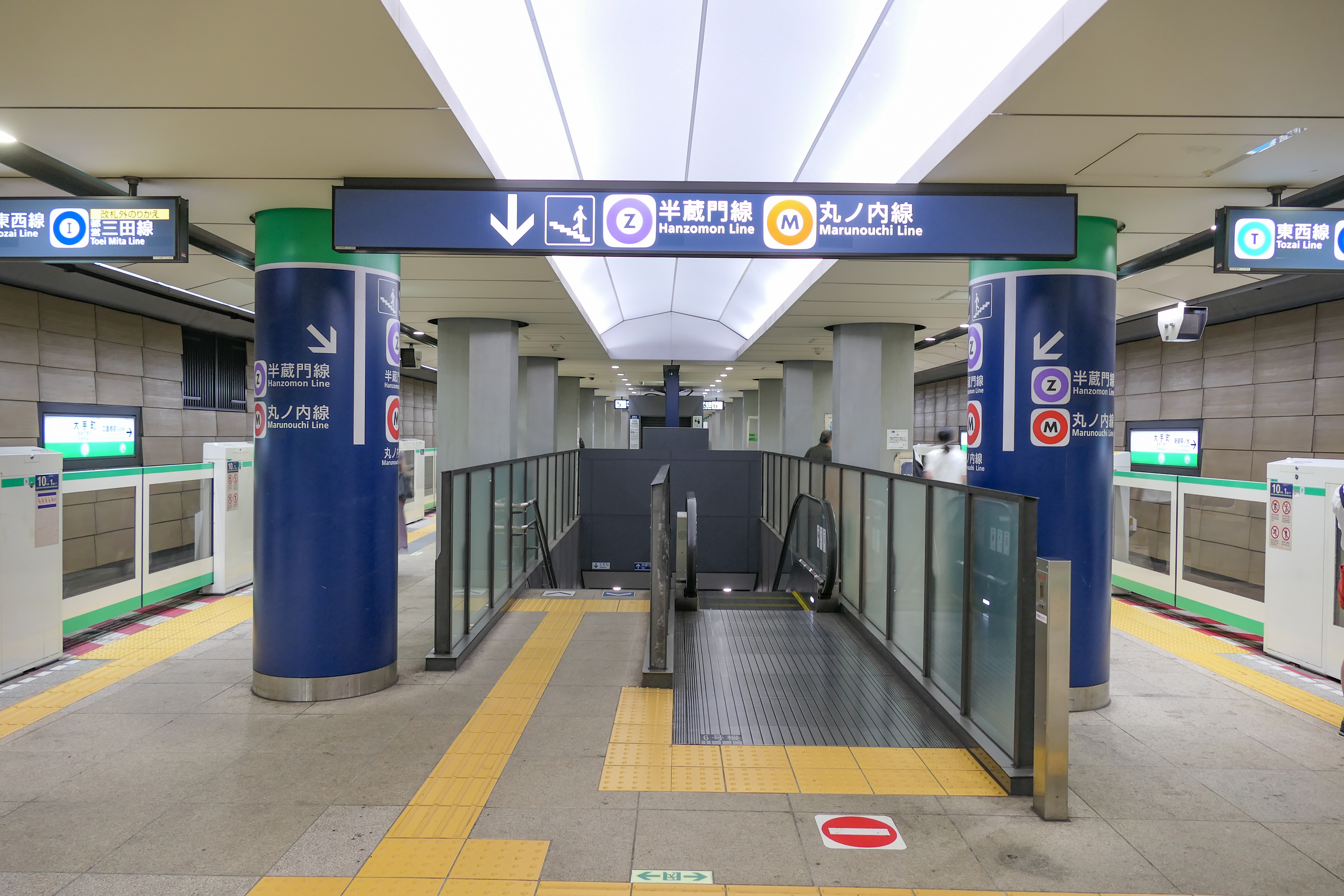
Chiyoda Line platform (July 2022)

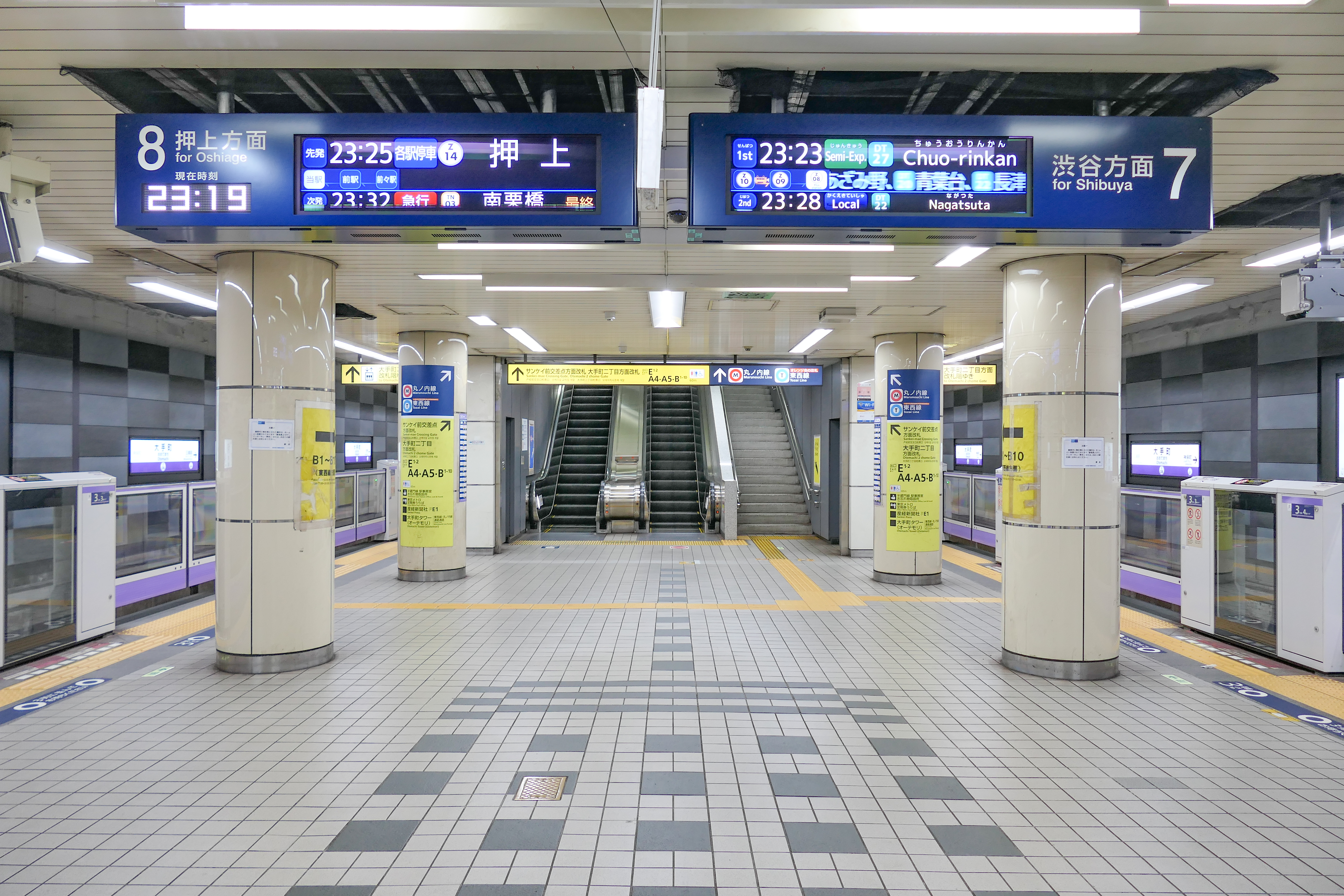
Hanzomon Line platform (July 2022)

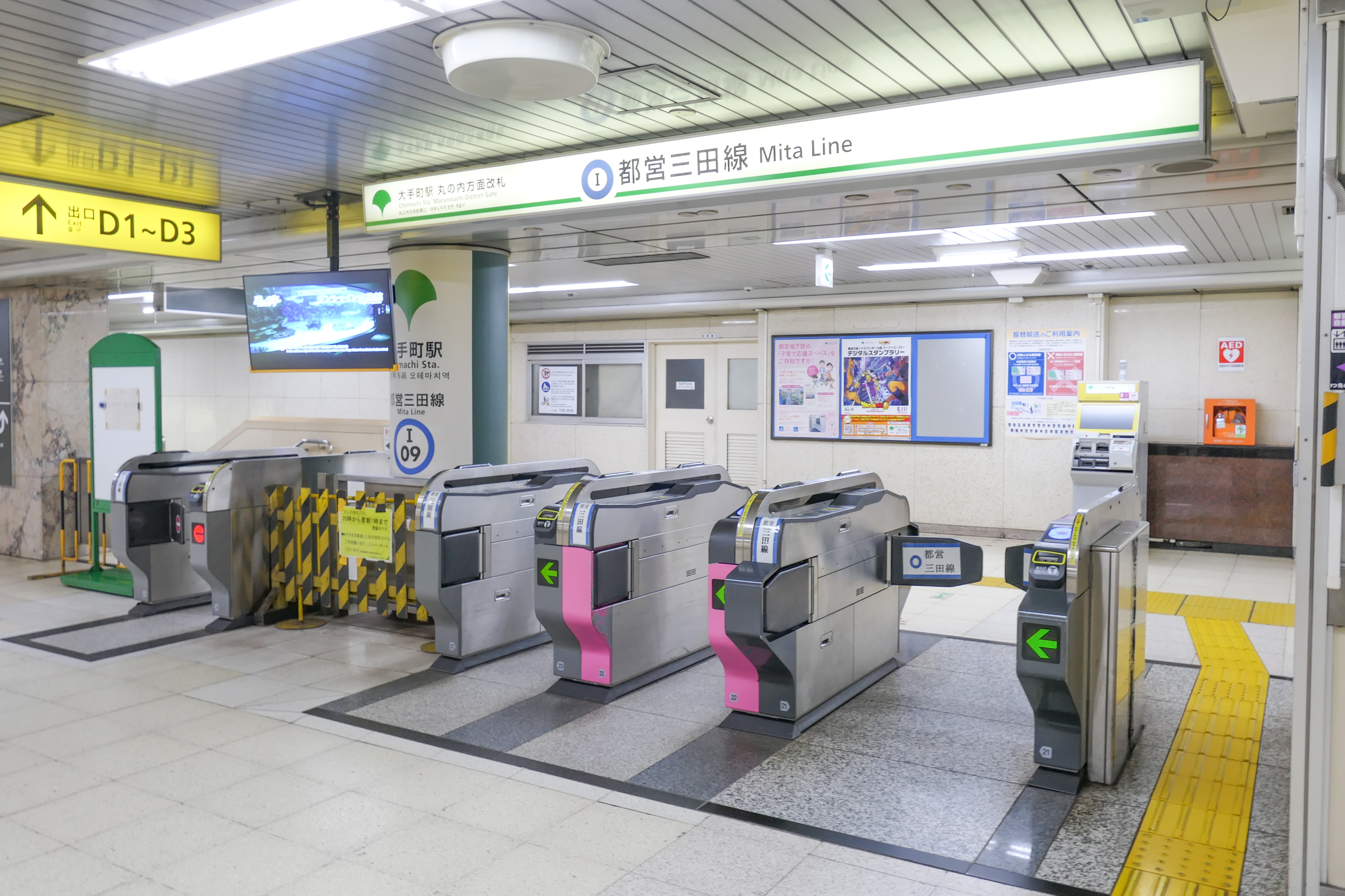
Ticket gates (June 2022)

=== Toei ===
1
Mita Line
- for Shirokane-takanawa and Meguro
- Meguro Line for Musashi-Kosugi and Hiyoshi
- Sotetsu Main Line for Ebina via the Tokyu/Sotetsu Shin-Yokohama Line
- Sotetsu Izumino Line for Shōnandai via the Tokyu/Sotetsu Shin-Yokohama Line
2
for Sugamo and Nishi-takashimadaira

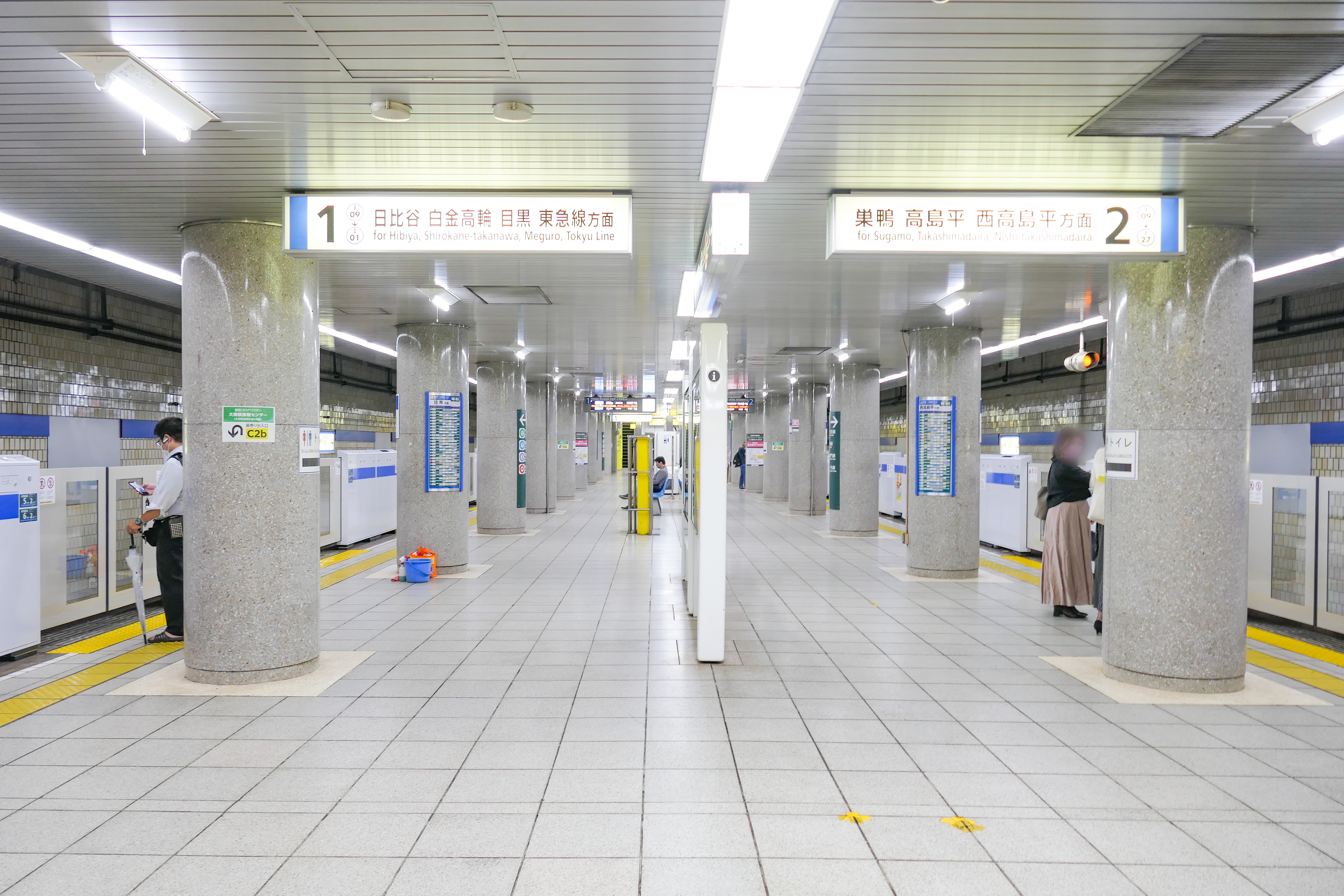
Mita Line platform (June 2022)

== History ==
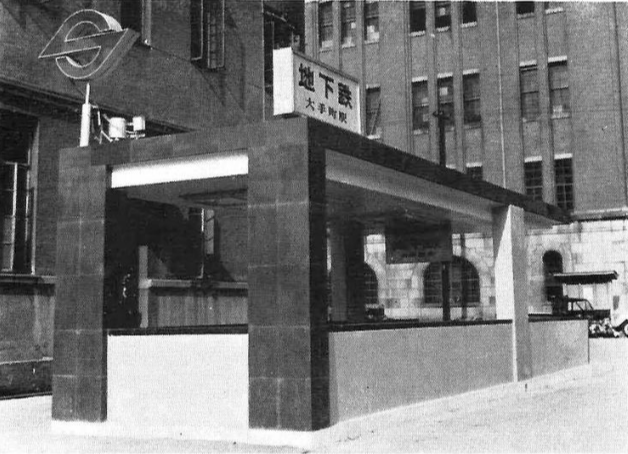
The station in 1956, operated by TRTA.

- The station opened on July 20, 1956 as a station on the Marunouchi Line.
- The Tōzai Line platforms opened on October 1, 1966 as a terminus of the line from Nakano, becoming through platforms on September 14, 1967.
- The Chiyoda Line platforms opened on December 20, 1969 as the terminus of the line from Kita-Senju; they became through platforms on March 20, 1971.
- The Mita Line platforms opened on June 30, 1972.
- The Hanzōmon Line platforms on January 26, 1989.

With the exception of the Mita Line, the station facilities of the remaining lines were inherited by Tokyo Metro after the privatization of the Teito Rapid Transit Authority (TRTA) in 2004.

== Surrounding area ==
- Marunouchi Building
- Otemachi Tower
- Palace Hotel
- Shin-Marunouchi Building
- Tokyo Imperial Palace
- Yomiuri Shimbun Building
