= Ogawamachi Station =

Ogawamachi Station (小川町駅) is the name of two train stations in Japan:

- Ogawamachi Station (Saitama), a railway station in Ogose, Saitama, Japan, jointly operated by East Japan Railway Company (JR East) and Tobu Railway
- Ogawamachi Station (Tokyo), a train station in Chiyoda, Tokyo, Japan operated by Toei Subway
