= Shin-ochanomizu Station =

Metro station in Tokyo, Japan

Coordinates: 35.697739°N 139.76584°E

Shin-ochanomizu Station 新御茶ノ水駅

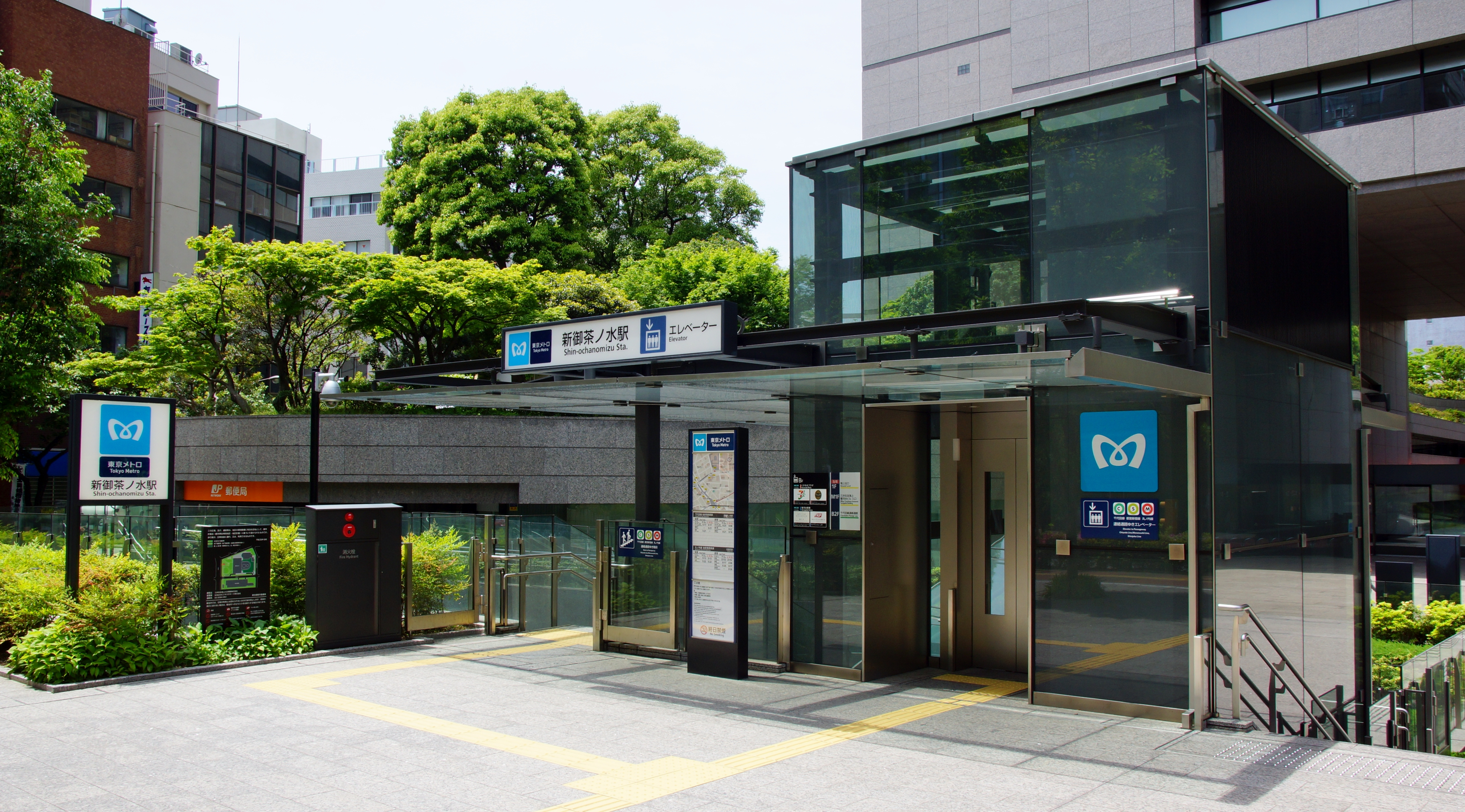
- Exit B3b, May 2016

General information
- Location: Kanda-Surugadai 3-chome, Chiyoda-ku, Tokyo; Japan
- Operator: Tokyo Metro
- Line: Chiyoda Line
- Platforms: 1 island platform
- Tracks: 2
- Connections: JC03 JB18 Ochanomizu Station; Awajicho Station; Ogawamachi Station

Construction
- Structure type: Underground

Other information
- Station code: C-12

History
- Opened: 20 December 1969; 56 years ago

Services
Preceding station	Tokyo Metro	Following station
Ōtemachi towards Yoyogi-Uehara	Chiyoda Line	Yushima towards Kita-Ayase
Location
- Location within Tokyo Yamanote Loop Location within Tokyo wards area Location within Japan

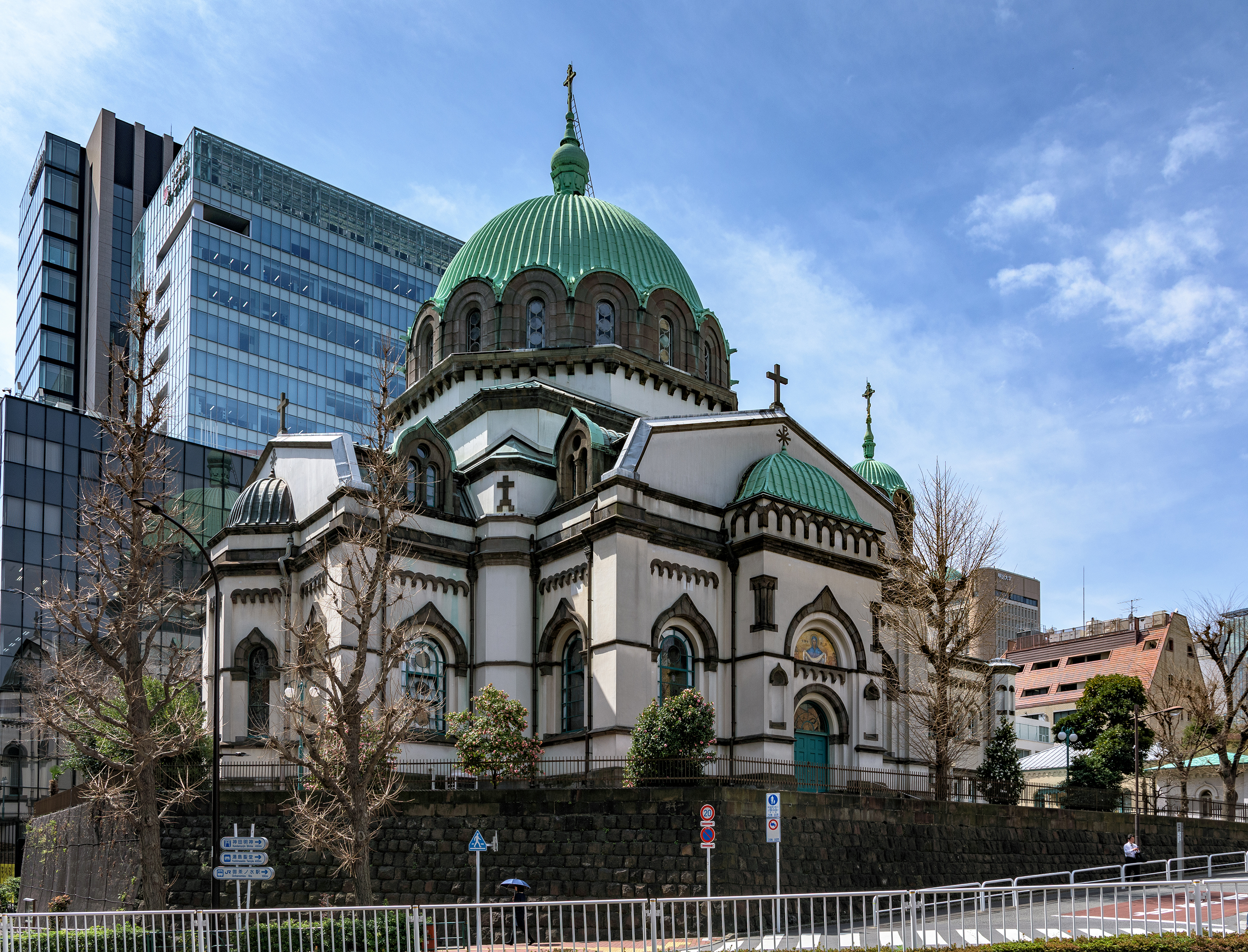
The Holy Resurrection Cathedral above Shin-ochanomizu Station

Shin-ochanomizu Station (新御茶ノ水駅, Shin-ochanomizu-eki) is a subway station on the Tokyo Metro Chiyoda Line in Chiyoda, Tokyo, Japan, operated by Tokyo Metro. Its station number is C-12.

Adjacent stations on the Chiyoda Line are Otemachi (C-11) and Yushima Station (C-13). Transfers are also possible to Awajicho Station (M-19) on the Tokyo Metro Marunouchi Line and Ogawamachi Station (S-07) on the Toei Shinjuku Line. East Japan Railway Company (JR East) Ochanomizu Station on the Chūō and the Chūō-Sōbu Lines lie above it at ground level.

== Station layout ==
The station consists of one island platform serving two tracks.

=== Platforms ===
1	Chiyoda Line	for Otemachi and Yoyogi-uehara; Odakyu Odawara Line for Hon-Atsugi and Isehara
2	Chiyoda Line	for Kita-senju, Ayase, and Kita-ayase; Jōban Line (Local) for Abiko and Toride

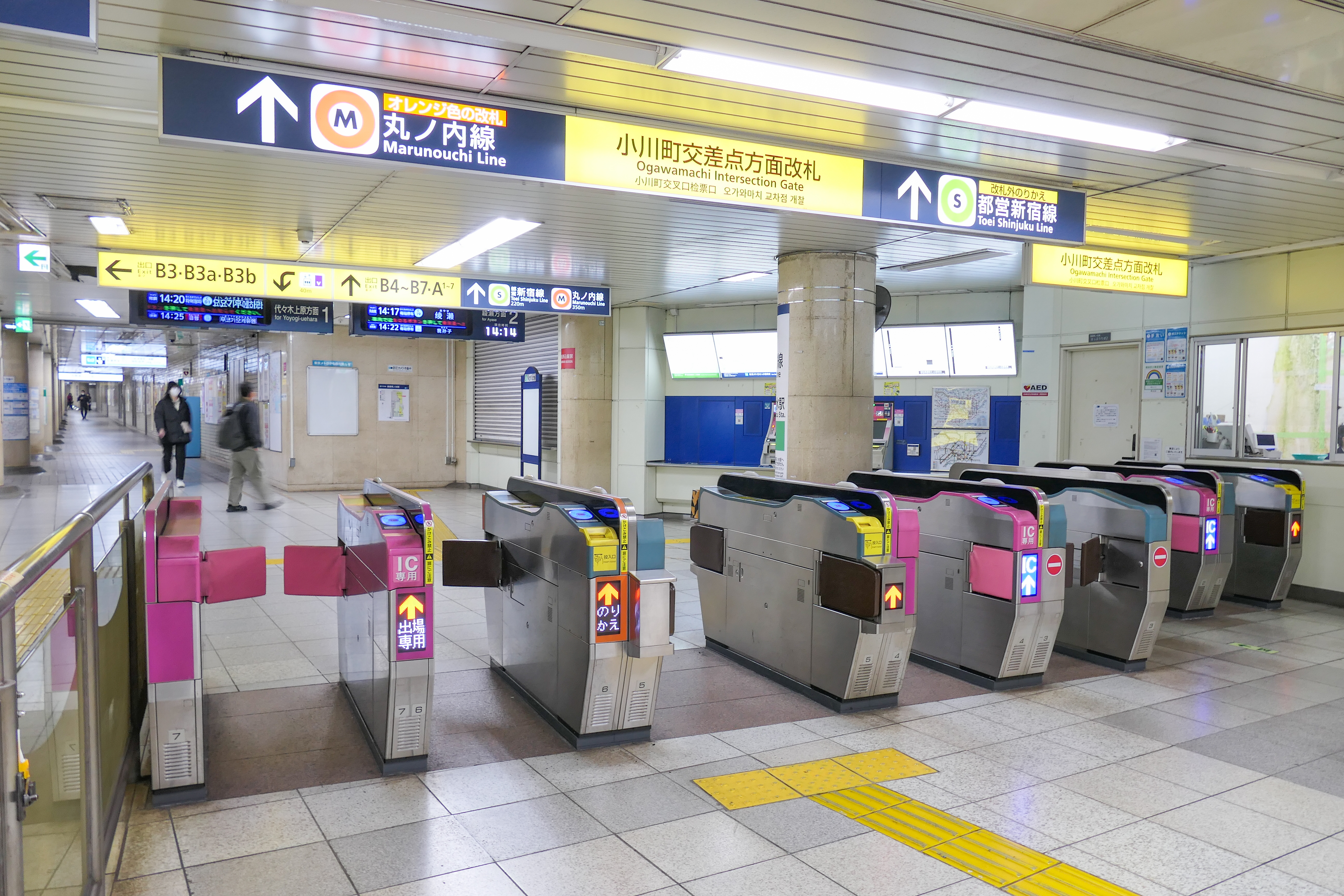
Ticket gate towards Ogawamachi Intersection, January 2023

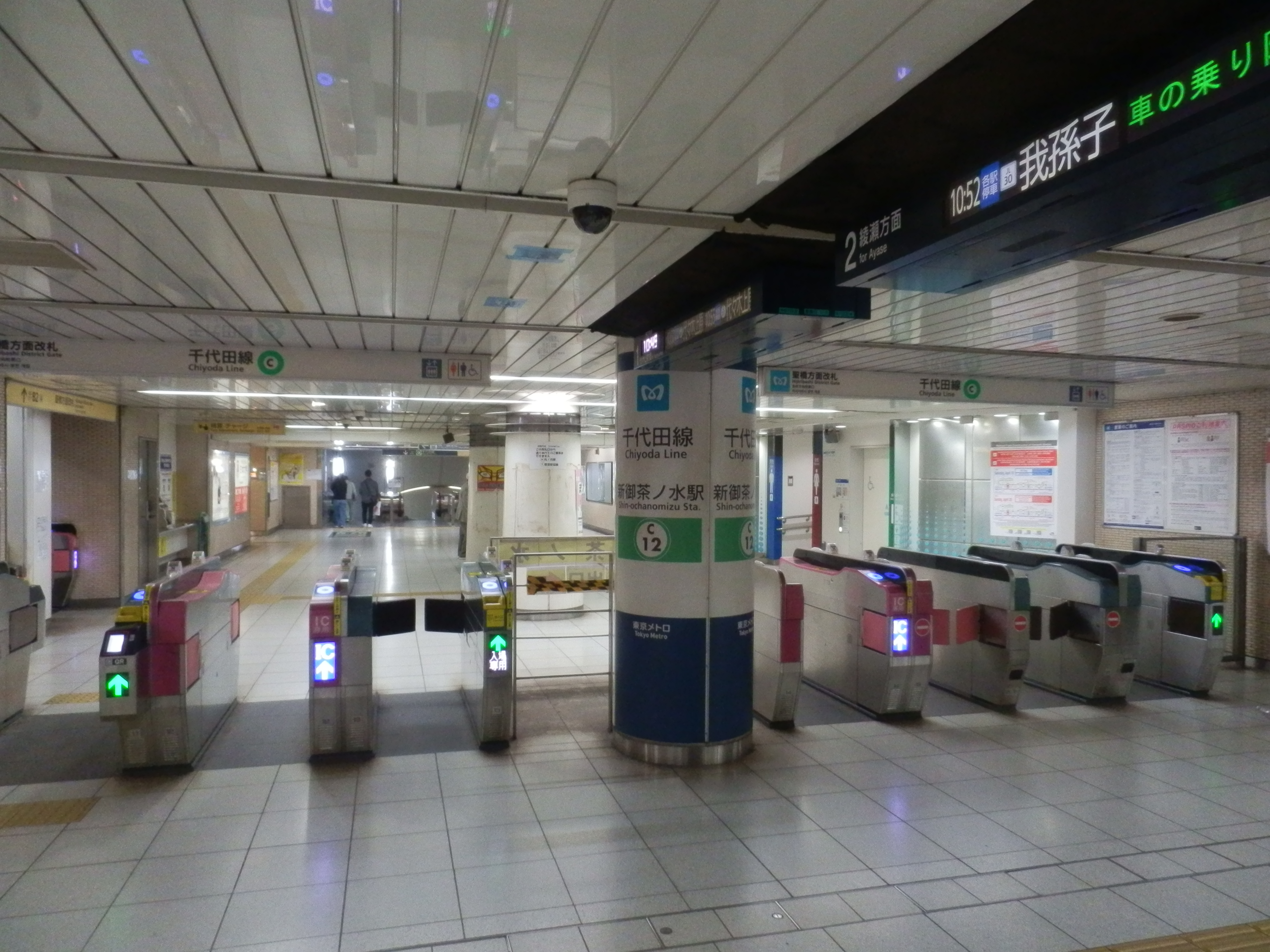
Ticket gate towards Hijiribashi, April 2025

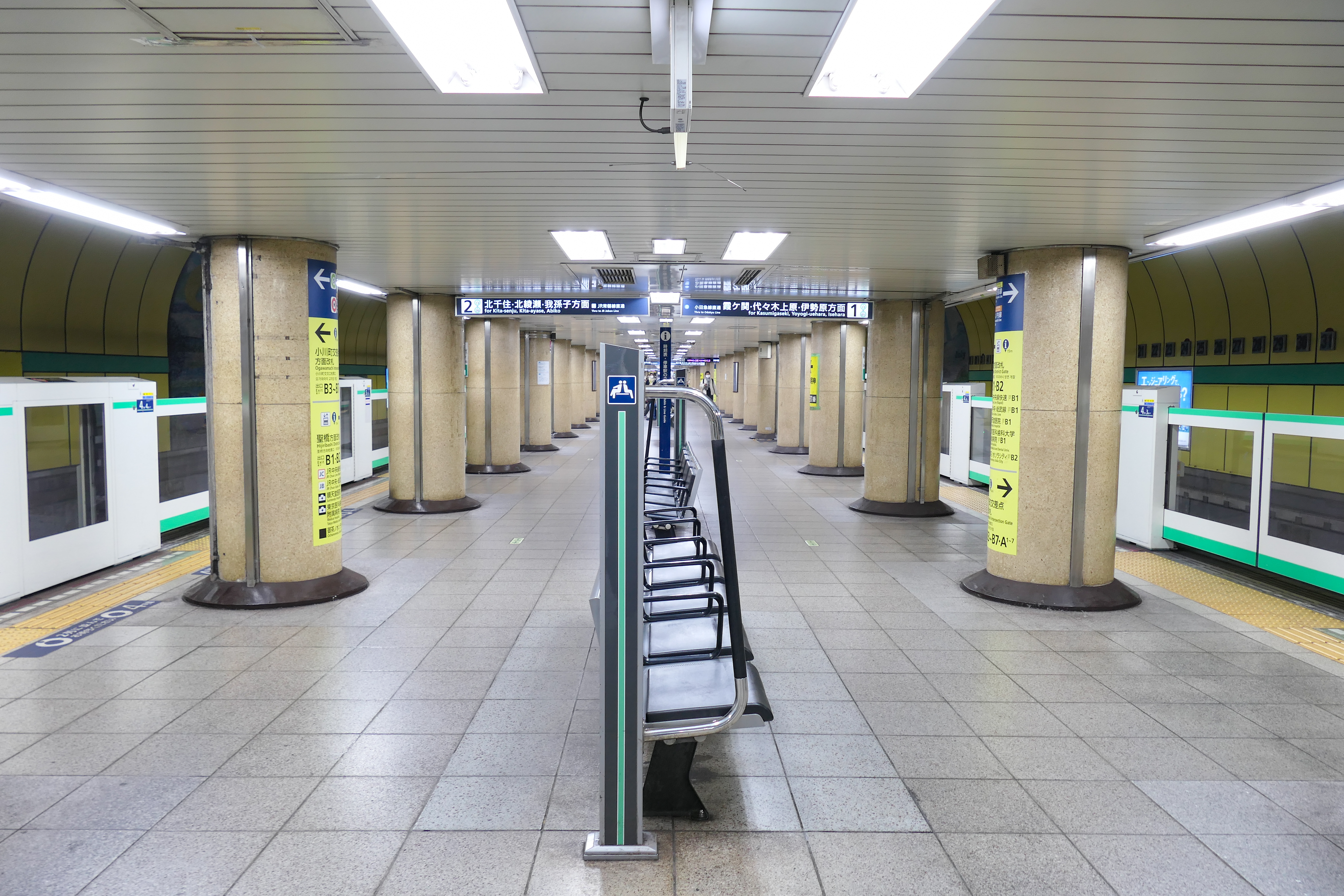
Platform, 2023

== History ==
The station was opened on December 20, 1969 by the Teito Rapid Transit Authority (TRTA).

Following the privatization of the TRTA in 2004, the station was inherited by the Tokyo Metro on 1 April 2004.

PASMO smart card coverage at this station began operation on 18 March 2007.

== Surrounding area ==
Shin-ochanomizu Station is convenient for passengers traveling to and from a number of places:

- Sundai Yobigakkō
- Hitachi Seisakusho
- Kanda Myōjin Shrine
- Akihabara
- Yushima Seidō Confucian temple
- Holy Resurrection Cathedral (Nicholai-dō)
- Tokyo Medical University
- Tokyo Medical University Hospital
- Juntendo University (medical department)
- Juntendo University Medical Department Hospital
- Meiji University (Headquarters and Surugadai Campus)
- Nihon University (Department of Dentistry, Engineering, Graduate Law Research)
- Surugadai Nihon University Hospital and related facilities
- Nihon University Casals Hall
- Chuo University Surugadai Memorial Hall
- Hilltop (Yamanoue) Hotel
- Tokyo YWCA Hall
- Kanda used-book district
- Kanda River
- Hijiri Bridge
- Hongō-dōri
- Meiji-dōri
- Sotobori-dōri
- Route 17
