= Kanda Station (Tokyo) =

Railway and metro station in Tokyo, Japan

Coordinates: 35.691731°N 139.771264°E

KNDJK27 JY02 JC02 Kanda Station 神田駅

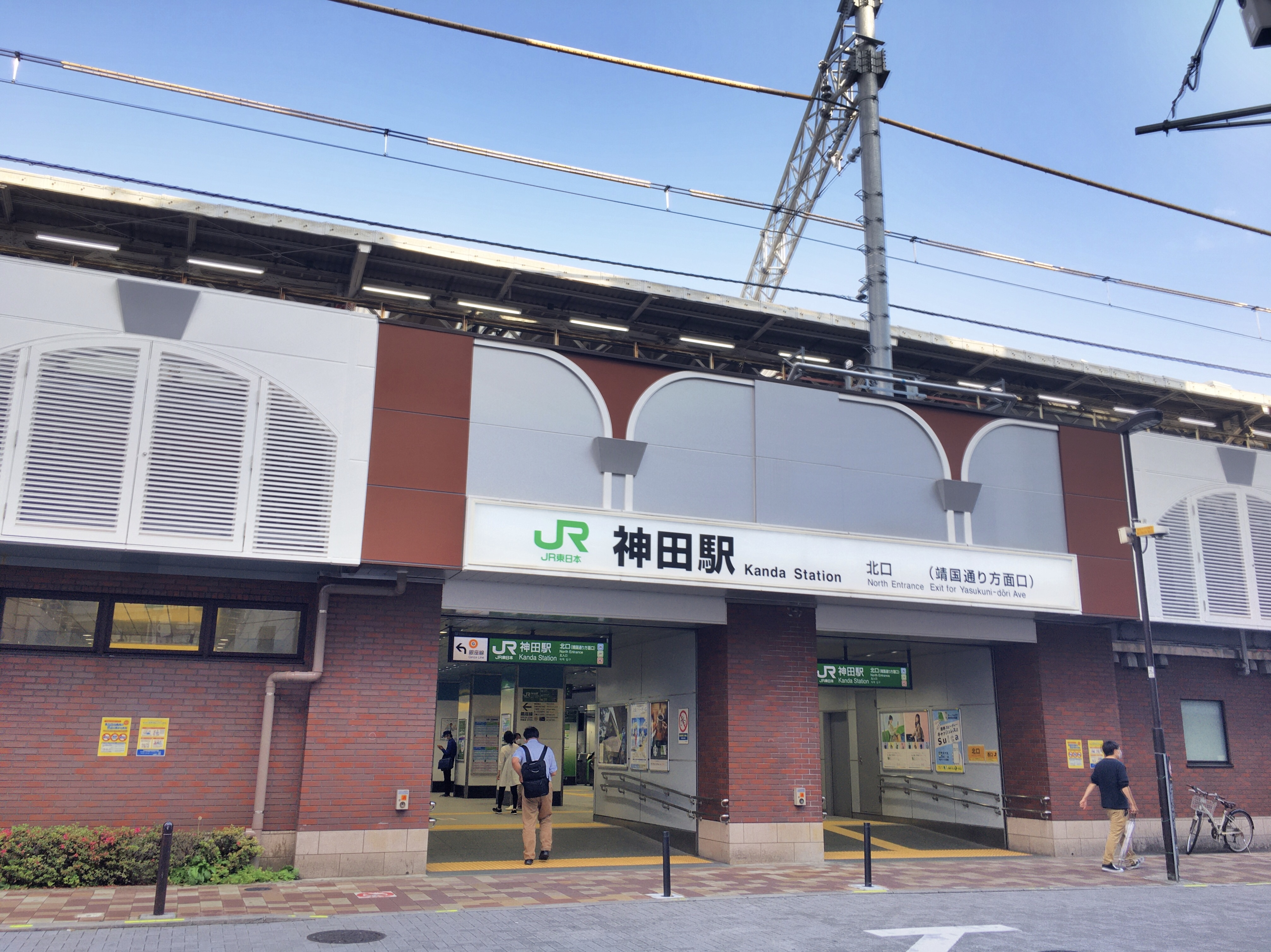
- The north entrance in May 2021

General information
- Location: 2-13-1 Kajichō, Chiyoda-ku, Tokyo; Japan
- Operator: JR East; Tokyo Metro
- Lines: Keihin–Tōhoku Line; Yamanote Line; Chūō Line; Ginza Line

Other information
- Station code: JK27 (Keihin-Tōhoku Line); JY02 (Yamanote Line); JC02 (Chūō Line); KND (JR East); G-13 (Tokyo Metro Ginza Line)

History
- Opened: 1 March 1919; 107 years ago

Passengers
- FY2024: 181,056 daily; 56,241 daily

Other services
Preceding station	JR East	Following station
Tokyo Next clockwise	Yamanote Line	Akihabara Next counter-clockwise
Tokyo towards Yokohama	Keihin–Tōhoku Line Rapid Local	Akihabara towards Ōmiya
Tokyo Terminus	Chūō Line Commuter Special Rapid	Ochanomizu One-way operation
Tokyo Terminus	Chūō Line Chūō Special Rapid	Ochanomizu JC03 towards Ōtsuki
Tokyo Terminus	Chūō Line Ōme Special Rapid	Ochanomizu JC03 towards Tachikawa
Tokyo One-way operation	Chūō Line Commuter Rapid	Ochanomizu JC03 towards Ōtsuki
Tokyo Terminus	Chūō Line Rapid	Ochanomizu JC03 towards Ōtsuki
Preceding station	Tokyo Metro	Following station
Mitsukoshimae towards Shibuya	Ginza Line	Suehirocho towards Asakusa
Location
- Location within Tokyo Yamanote Loop Location within Tokyo wards area Location within Japan

Kanda Station (神田駅, Kanda-eki) is a railway station in Chiyoda, Tokyo, Japan. East Japan Railway Company (JR East) and Tokyo Metro operate individual portions of the station.

== Lines ==
- JR East
  - Keihin-Tōhoku Line
  - Yamanote Line
  - Chūō Line (Rapid)
- Tokyo Metro
  - Tokyo Metro Ginza Line

== Station layout ==
Kanda consists of two separate stations that form an interchange. The elevated station is operated by JR East and the underground station is operated by the Tokyo Metro. Although they are an interchange, passengers must pass through ticket barriers and pay separate fares to switch between services.

=== JR East station ===
The JR East station is the older of the two stations and opened in 1919. It is situated on an elevated viaduct and has three island platforms serving six tracks. The platforms are numbered sequentially from east to west starting with platform 1. Yamanote Line trains use the inner platforms 2 and 3, Keihin-Tōhoku Line trains use platforms 1 and 4, and Chūō Line trains use platforms 5 and 6 as they split off from the main line north of Kanda. There are an additional two tracks east of the station; these are used for Shinkansen trains running between Tokyo Station and Ueno.

There are two sets of entrances and exits (a total of four) that allow passengers to access the JR East station. The northern set, the north and east exits, offers a connection to the Ginza Line on the Tokyo Metro. The southern set, the south and west exits, has a View Plaza travel service centre. Both exits have rows of ticket machines, ticket gates, and a JR reservation office.

1	Keihin–Tōhoku Line	for Shinagawa, Yokohama, and Ōfuna
2	Yamanote Line	for Tokyo and Shinagawa
3	Yamanote Line	for Ueno and Ikebukuro
4	Keihin-Tōhoku Line	for Ueno, Akabane, and Ōmiya
5	Chūō Line	for Tokyo
6	Chūō Line	for Ochanomizu, Shinjuku, and Takao

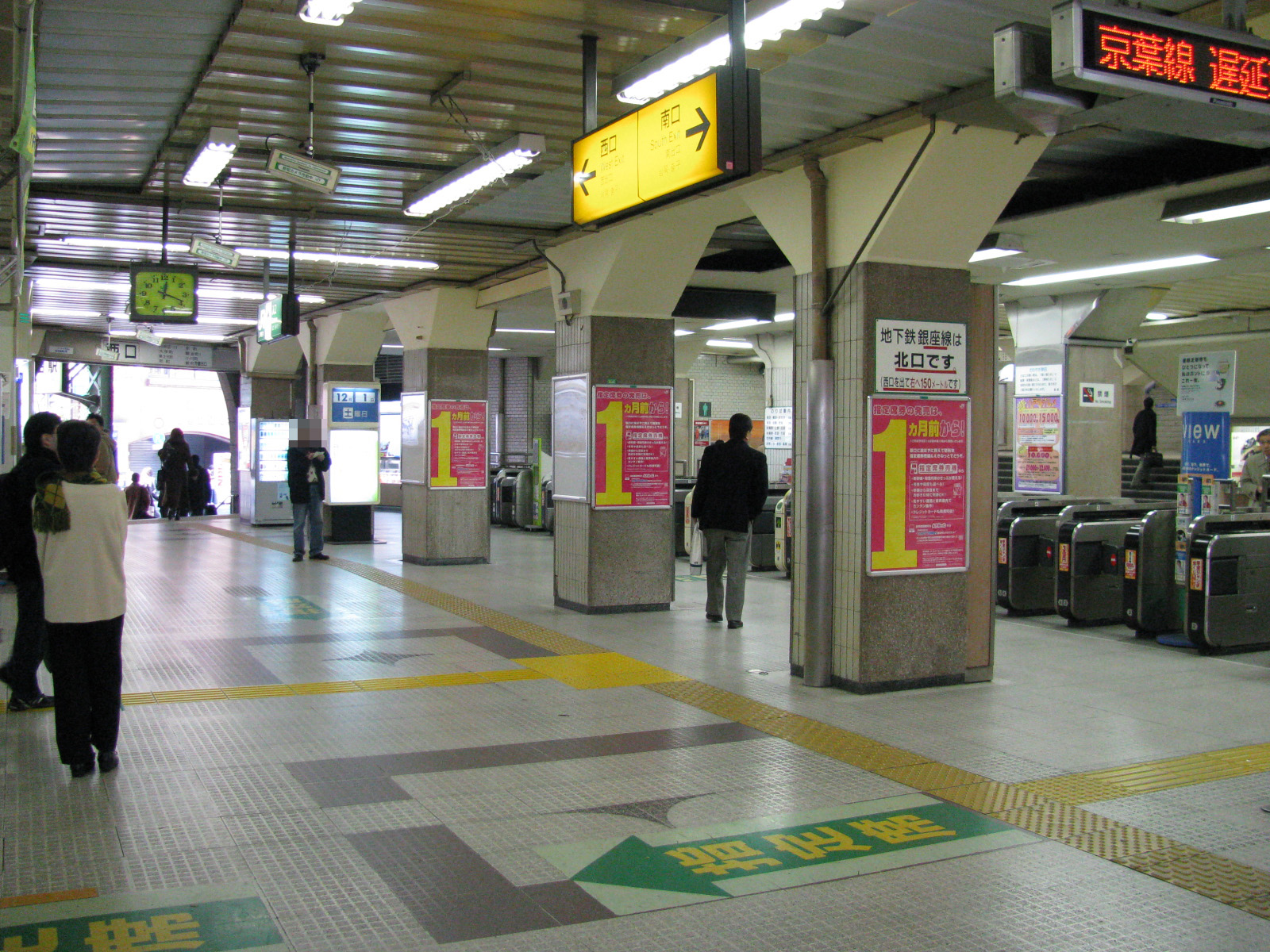
Ticket gates at the south and west exits

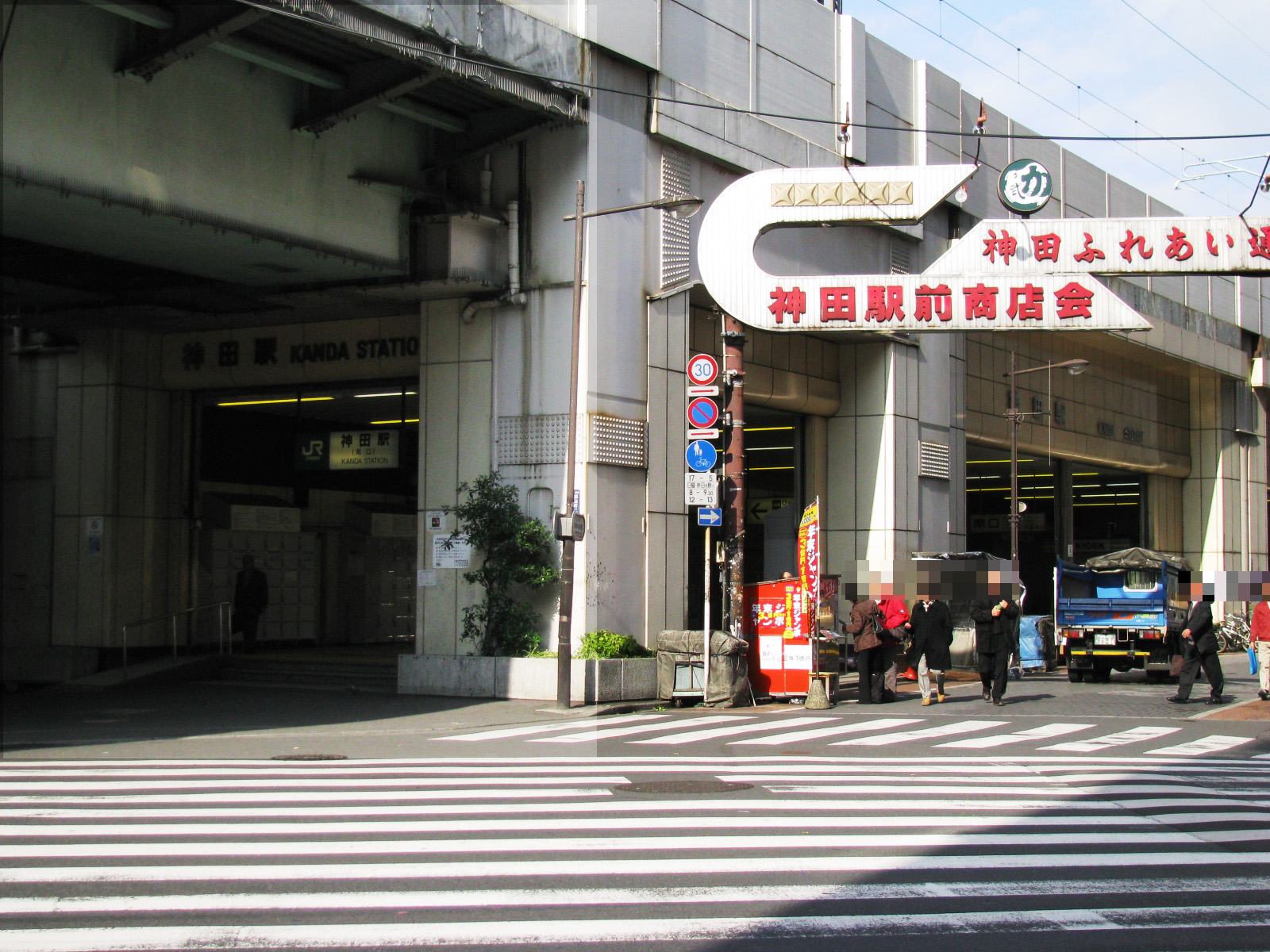
The south entrance

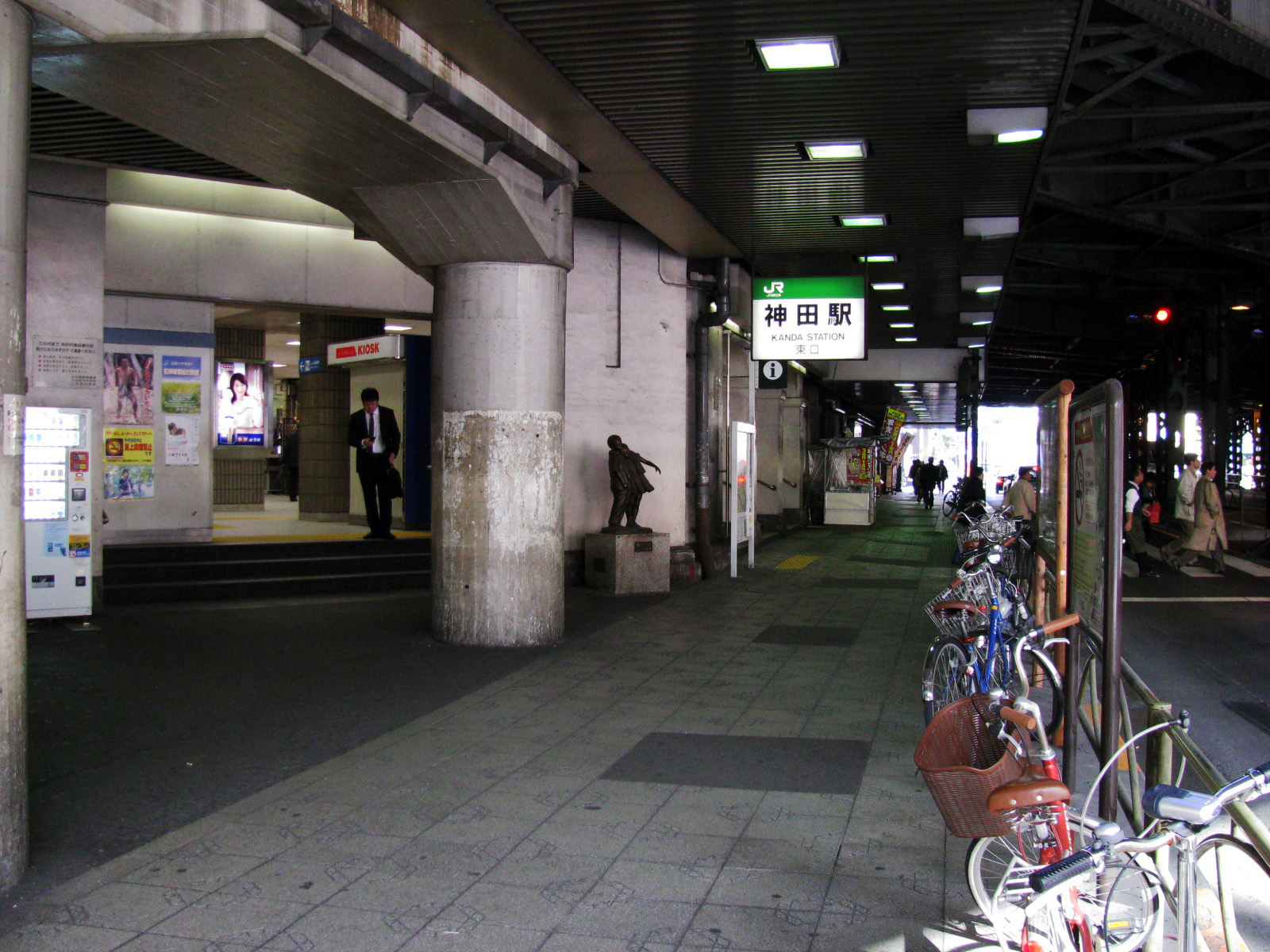
The west entrance

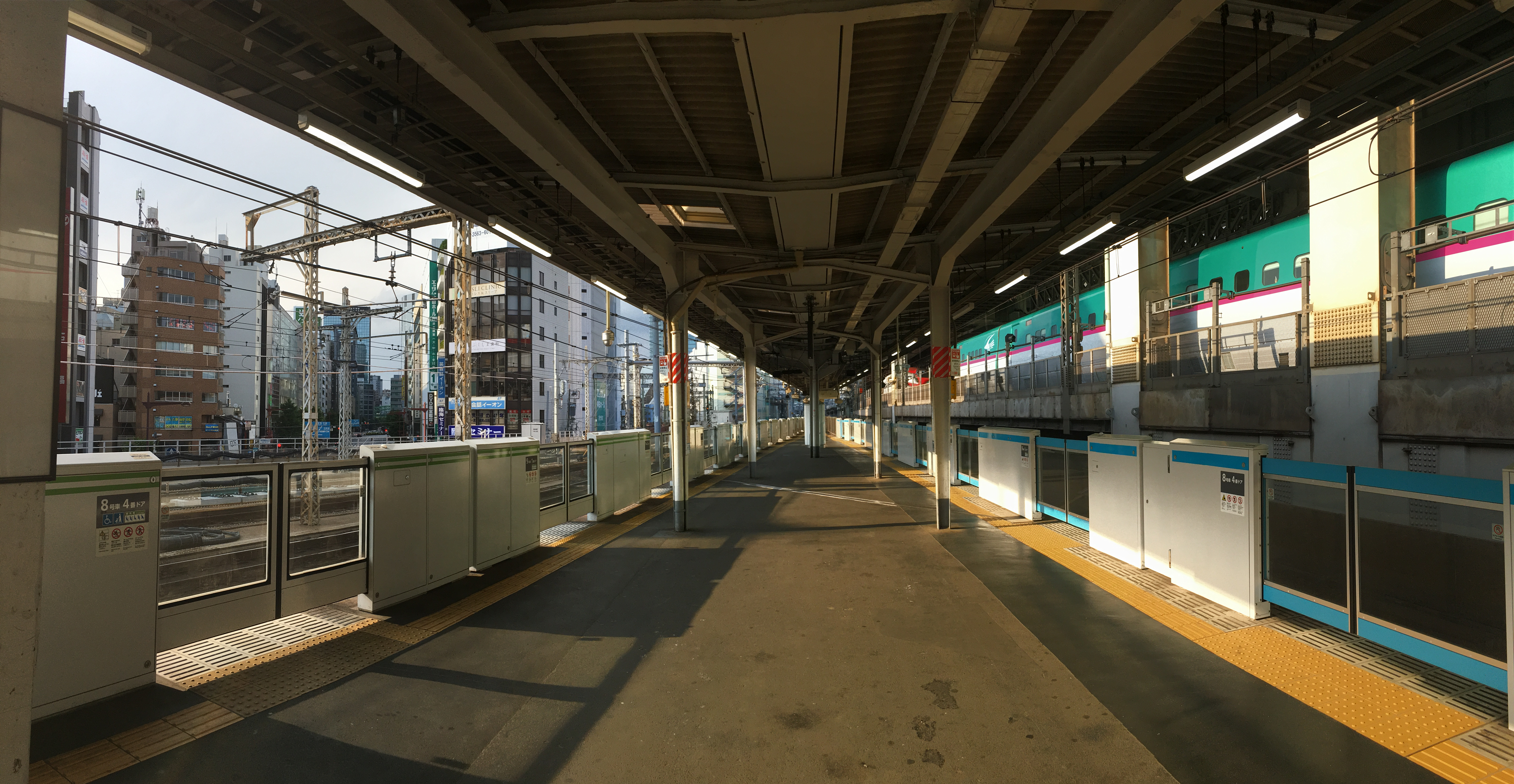
Yamanote Line (left) and Keihin-Tōhoku Line (right) platform screen doors, 2021

=== Tokyo Metro ===
The Tokyo Metro station is the newer of the two stations and opened in 1931 as part of an extension of first subway line in Asia, the Tokyo Underground Railway (later the Ginza Line). There is a simple island platform setup with two tracks. Platform 1 is for southbound trains to Ginza and Shibuya whilst platform 2 is used for northbound trains to Ueno and Asakusa.

Access to the station is provided by a total of six entrances and exits. Exits and 1 and 2 are used as the connection to the JR East station and are on Chūō-dōri (中央通り). Exits 3 and 4 are on the same street but in the centre of the station near Kanda-Kajichō. Exits 5 and 6 are at the northernmost part of the station.

It is also relatively close to Awajichō Station on the Tokyo Metro Marunouchi Line and Ogawamachi Station on the Toei Shinjuku Line (around 300 meters to the west), although it is not officially recognized as a transfer station and there is no transfer corridor between the three stations.

1	Ginza Line	for Ginza and Shibuya
2	Ginza Line	for Ueno and Asakusa

The song "Omatsuri Mambo" (お祭りマンボ, Omatsuri Mambo) by Hibari Misora is used as the departure melody for the Ginza Line platforms in 2015.

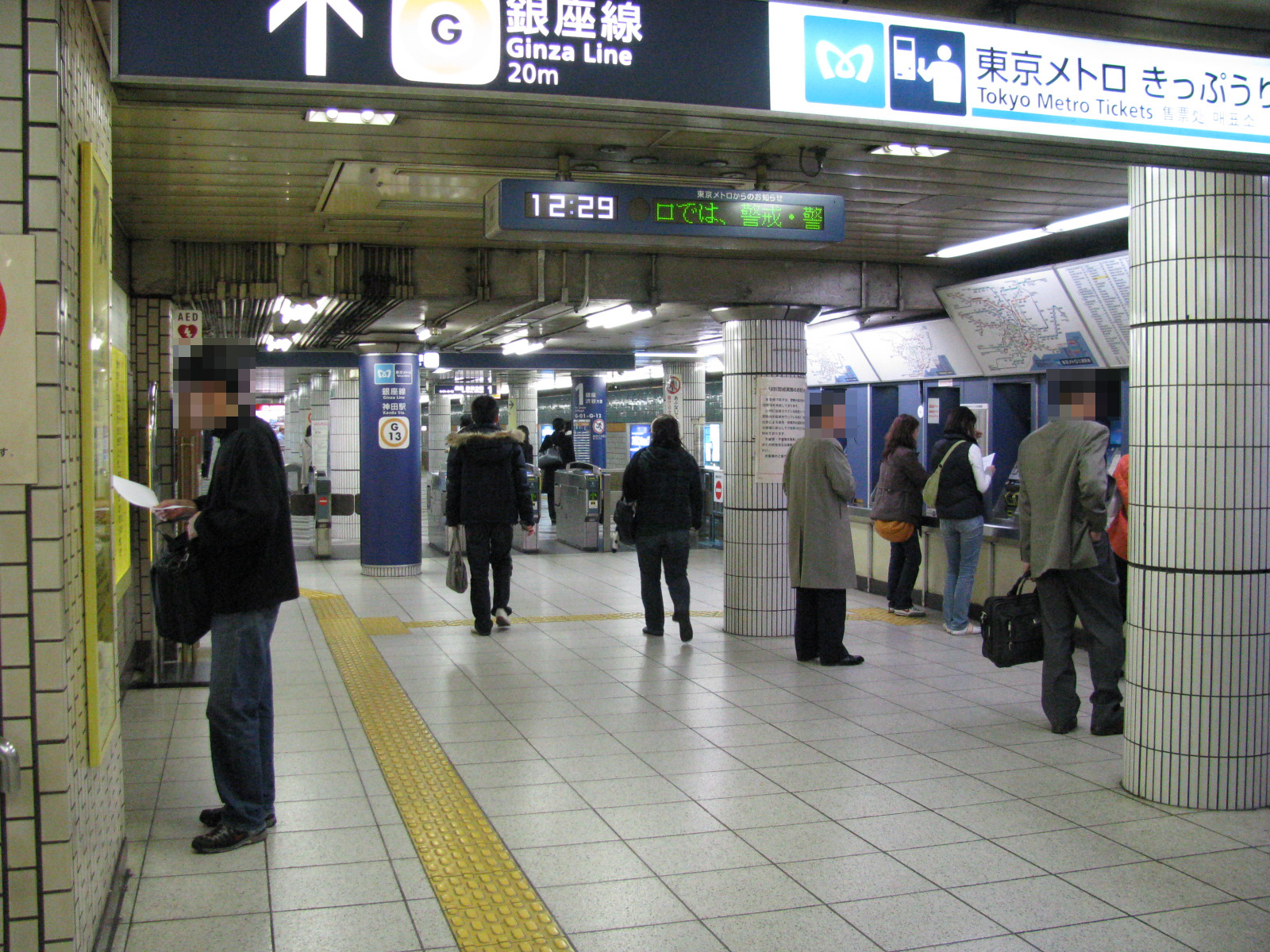
Row of ticket machines and fare table

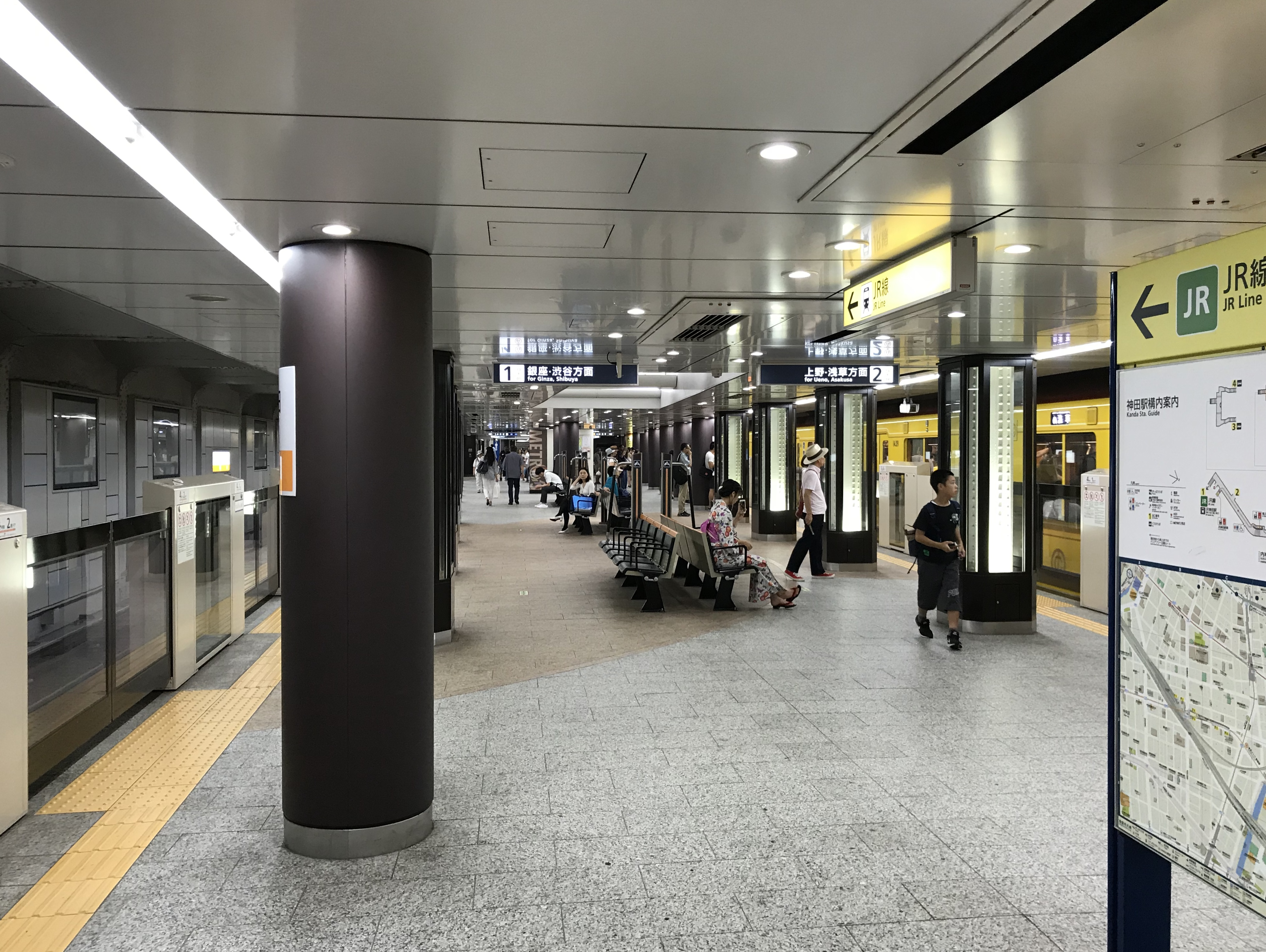
Platforms, August 2018

== History ==
The station first opened on March 1, 1919 when the Chūō Main Line was extended from Manseibashi Station, which existed between Kanda and Ochanomizu, to Tokyo Station.

The tracks of Tōhoku Main Line, now used by trains on the Keihin-Tōhoku Line and the Yamanote Line, extended from Akihabara Station to Kanda and further to Tokyo on November 1, 1925. This extension completed the loop of the Yamanote Line.

The subway station opened on November 21, 1931. On this day, the subway closed the temporary terminal at Manseibashi Station and made Kanda Station the new terminus. The station became an intermediate station on April 29, 1932 when the line was extended to Mitsukoshimae Station.

The station facilities of the Ginza Line were inherited by Tokyo Metro after the privatization of the Teito Rapid Transit Authority (TRTA) in 2004.

The extension through Kanda Station of the Tōhoku Shinkansen from its previous terminus at Ueno to Tokyo breached a pair of express tracks of the Tohoku Main Line through the station. These are being reinstated by the Tōhoku Jūkan Line project. The project was due to be completed in 2013 but was subsequently delayed until 2015 as a result of the 2011 Tōhoku earthquake and tsunami.

From March 14, 2015 onwards, Keihin-Tōhoku rapid services began serving the station.

Station numbering was introduced to the JR East platforms in 2016 with Kanda being assigned station numbers JC02 for the Chūō line rapid, JK27 for the Keihin–Tōhoku Line, and JY02 for the Yamanote line. At the same time, JR East assigned the station a three-letter code to its major transfer stations; Kanda was assigned the code "KND".

== Passenger statistics ==
In fiscal 2013, the JR East station was used by an average of 97,589 passengers daily (boarding passengers only), making it the fortieth-busiest station operated by JR East. In fiscal 2013, the Tokyo Metro station was used by an average of 52,612 passengers per day (exiting and entering passengers), making it the seventieth-busiest station operated by Tokyo Metro. The average daily passenger figures for each operator in previous years are as shown below.

Fiscal year	JR East	Tokyo Metro
2000	111,311	
2005	105,782	
2010	101,075	
2011	99,307	49,410
2012	97,779	52,247
2013	97,589	52,612

- Note that JR East figures are for boarding passengers only.

== Surrounding area ==
- Awajichō Station ( Tokyo Metro Marunouchi Line)
- Ogawamachi Station ( Toei Shinjuku Line)

== See also ==
- List of railway stations in Japan
