= Ochanomizu Station =

Railway and metro station in Tokyo, Japan

Coordinates: 35°41′59″N 139°45′50″E

Ochanomizu Station 御茶ノ水駅
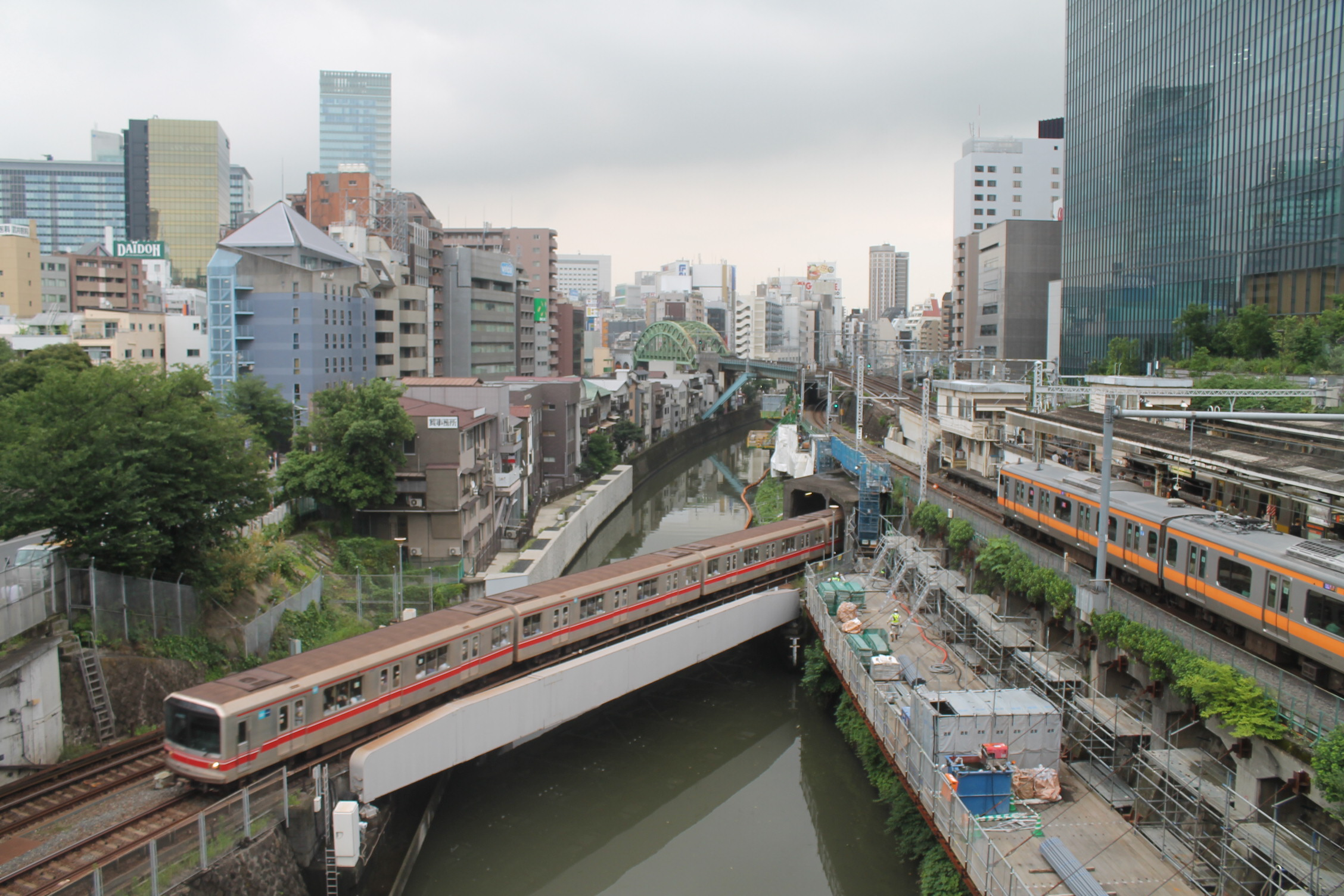
- Ochanomizu Station

General information
- Location: Chiyoda and Bunkyō wards, Tokyo; Japan
- Operator: JR East; Tokyo Metro
- Lines: Chūō Line (Rapid); Chūō-Sōbu Line; Marunouchi Line
Location
- Location within Tokyo Yamanote Loop Location within Tokyo wards area Location within Japan

Ochanomizu Station (御茶ノ水駅, Ochanomizu-eki) is a railway station in Tokyo, Japan, operated by the East Japan Railway Company (JR East) and Tokyo subway operator Tokyo Metro. The station straddles the boundary between the Chiyoda and Bunkyō special wards; the JR station is in the former while the Tokyo Metro station is in the latter.

== Lines ==
Ochanomizu Station is serviced by the following lines:

- JR East
  - Chūō Main Line (including Chūō Line and Chūō-Sōbu Line)
  - Sōbu Main Line (including Chūō-Sōbu Line)
- Tokyo Metro
  - Marunouchi Line

Passengers can also transfer to nearby Shin-ochanomizu Station on the Tokyo Metro Chiyoda Line.

== Location ==
JR East's Ochanomizu station lies south of the Kanda River in Chiyoda ward. During the Edo period, the Kanda River was rerouted to pass through Ochanomizu, which was otherwise a highland between two valleys. Hijiribashi (聖橋, Hijiri Bridge) crosses over the river near a station exit. The subway Marunouchi Line makes a short above-ground appearance as it passes over the river. Holy Resurrection Cathedral (Nicholai-dō) is easily accessible from the Hijiribashi Exit of this station. The Ochanomizu neighborhood is known for its many guitar and instrument shops.

The Tokyo Metro station is located in Bunkyō Ward, separate from the JR East station, and is served by the Marunouchi Line. The area is also served by the Chiyoda Line at Shin-Ochanomizu, which is connected to Ogawamachi on the Shinjuku Line.

== JR East ==
JC03 JB18 Ochanomizu Station 御茶ノ水駅
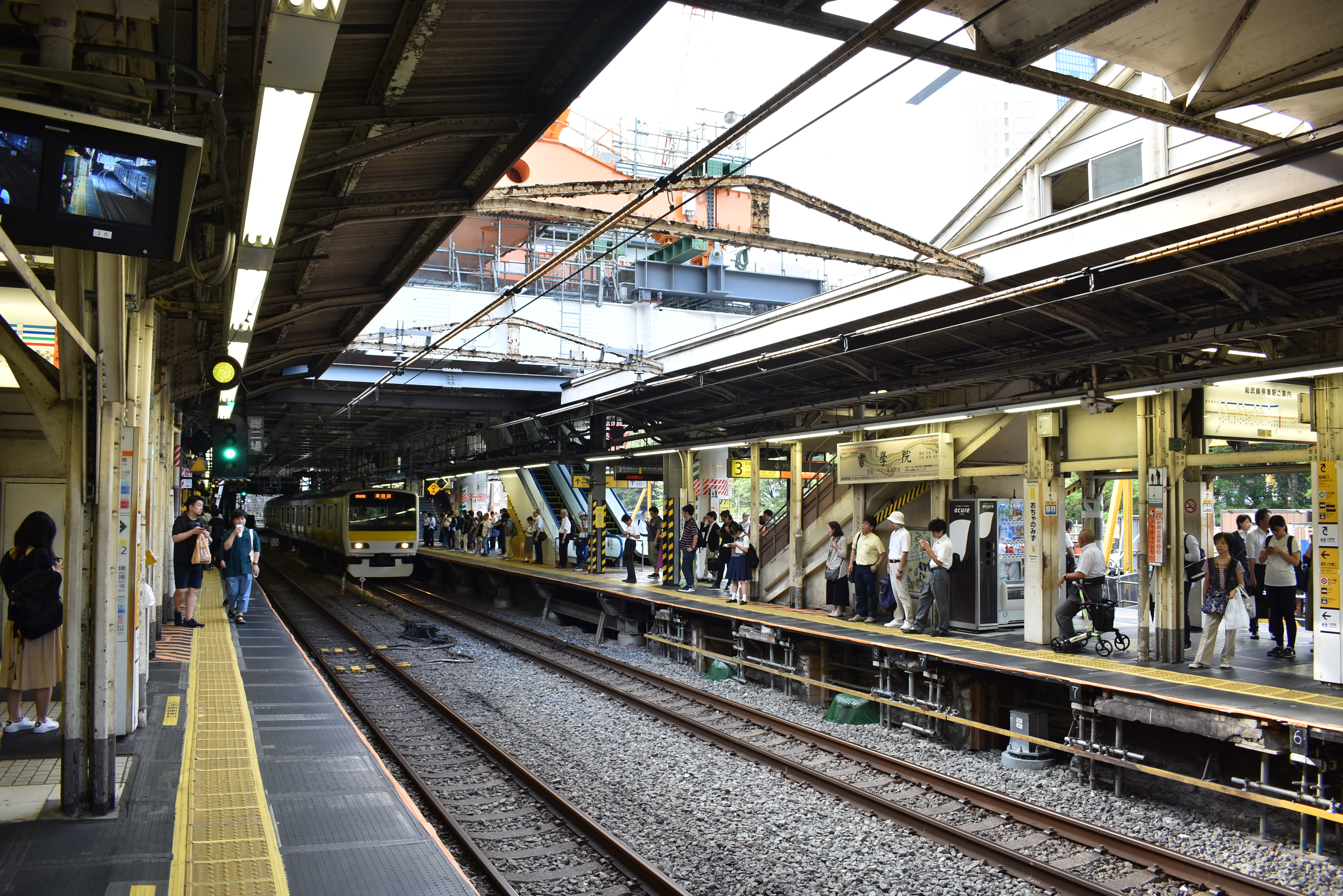
- JR East platforms, August 2019

General information
- Location: 2 Kanda-Surugadai, Chiyoda City, Tokyo; Japan
- Operator: JR East
- Lines: Chūō Line; Chūō-Sōbu Line
- Platforms: 2 island platforms
- Tracks: 4
- Connections: Shin-ochanomizu

Construction
- Structure type: At grade

Other information
- Station code: JC03 (Chūō Line (Rapid)); JB18 (Chūō-Sōbu Line)
- Website: Official website

History
- Opened: 31 December 1904; 121 years ago

Passengers
- FY2024: 176,728 (daily)

Services
Preceding station	JR East	Following station
Yotsuya One-way operation	Chūō Line Commuter Special Rapid	Kanda towards Tokyo
Yotsuya JC04 towards Ōtsuki	Chūō Line Chūō Special Rapid	Kanda towards Tokyo
Yotsuya JC04 towards Tachikawa	Chūō Line Ōme Special Rapid	Kanda towards Tokyo
Yotsuya JC04 towards Ōtsuki	Chūō Line Commuter Rapid	Kanda One-way operation
Yotsuya JC04 towards Ōtsuki	Chūō Line Rapid	Kanda towards Tokyo
Suidōbashi JB17 towards Mitaka	Chūō–Sōbu Line	Akihabara towards Chiba
Location

The JR East portion of the station has two island platforms serving four tracks, forming a Cross-platform interchange. Tracks 1 and 4 (the outer tracks) serve trains on the Chūō Line whilst tracks 2 and 3 are used by trains on the Chūō-Sōbu Line.

=== Platforms ===
1	Chūō Line (Rapid)	for Shinjuku, Tachikawa and Takao
2	Chūō-Sōbu Line	for Shinjuku, Nakano and Mitaka
3	Chūō-Sōbu Line	for Kinshichō, Funabashi and Chiba
4	Chūō Line (Rapid)	for Tokyo

There are two exits from Ochanomizu to street level. The larger of the two is the Ochanomizu-bashi exit on the western end of the station which features ticket vending machines, a JR reservation office, toilets, and lockers. The other is the Hijiri-bashi exit which only has ticket vending machines and toilets.

== Tokyo Metro ==
Ochanomizu Station 御茶ノ水駅

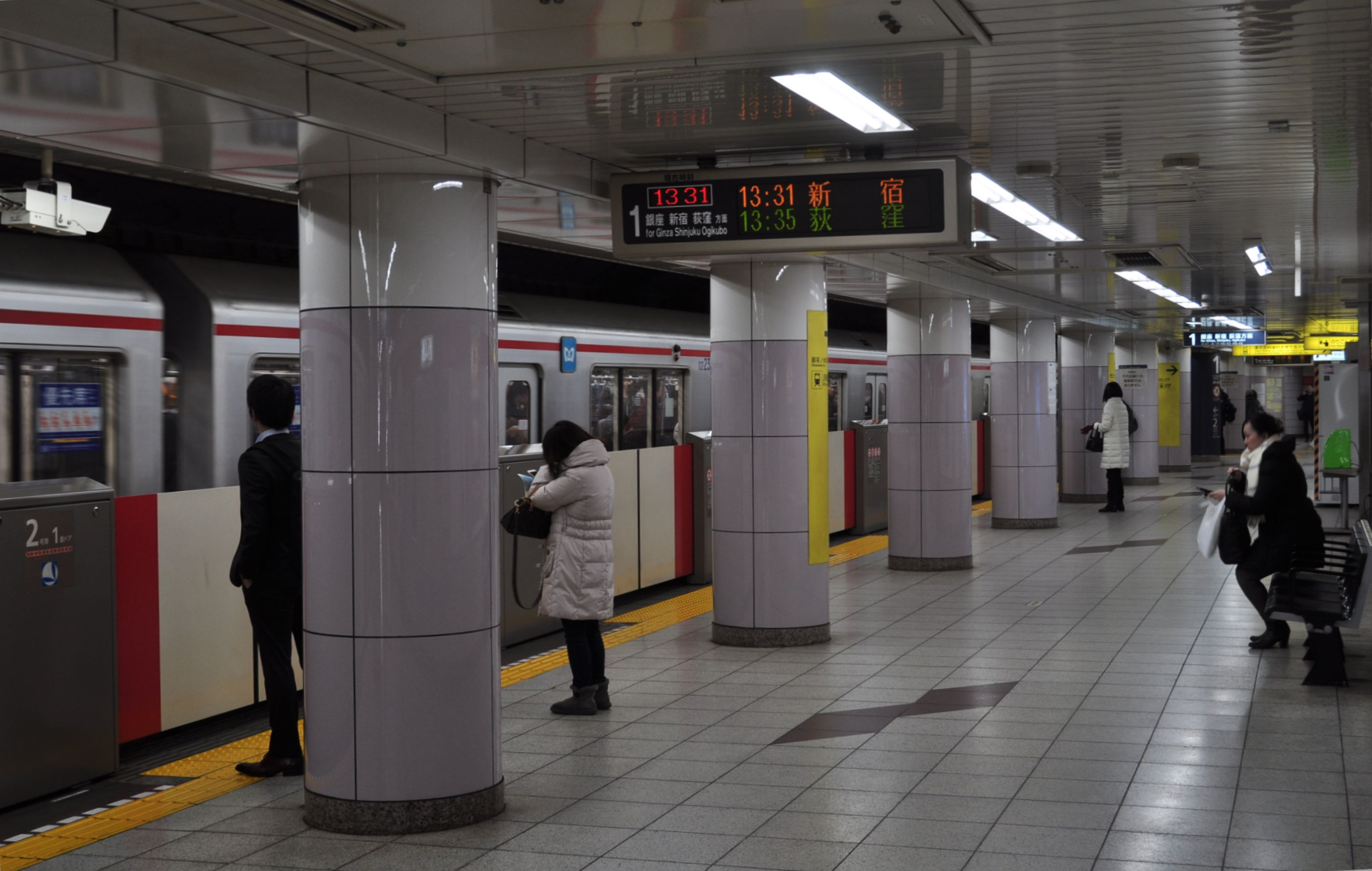
- Marunouchi Line platforms, February 2018

General information
- Location: 1-5-8 Yushima, Bunkyō-ku, Tokyo; Japan
- Operator: Tokyo Metro
- Line: Marunouchi Line
- Platforms: 2 side platforms
- Tracks: 2

Construction
- Structure type: Underground

Other information
- Station code: M-20
- Website: Official website

History
- Opened: 20 January 1954; 72 years ago

Passengers
- FY2024: 54,548 (daily)

Services
Preceding station	Tokyo Metro	Following station
Awajicho towards Ogikubo or Hōnanchō	Marunouchi Line	Hongō-sanchōme towards Ikebukuro
Location

The Tokyo Metro station consists of two side platforms serving two tracks.

=== Platforms ===
1	Marunouchi Line	for Tokyo, Ginza, Shinjuku and Ogikubo
2	Marunouchi Line	for Kōrakuen and Ikebukuro

== History ==
The JR East station opened on 31 December 1904. The Tokyo Metro station opened on 20 January 1954 by the Teito Rapid Transit Authority (TRTA).

== Passenger statistics ==
In fiscal 2013, the JR East station was used by 104,737 passengers daily (boarding passengers only), making it the 34th-busiest station operated by JR East. In fiscal 2013, the Tokyo Metro station was used by an average of 55,529 passengers per day (exiting and entering passengers), making it the 66th-busiest station operated by Tokyo Metro. The average daily passenger figures for each operator in previous years are as shown below.

Fiscal year	JR East	Tokyo Metro
1999	118,211	
2000	116,955	
2005	106,967	
2010	101,617	
2011	100,518	51,629
2012	100,157	52,642
2013	104,737	55,529

- Note that JR East figures are for boarding passengers only.

The Number of Passengers on Ochanomizu Station as recorded by the East Japan Railway Company Trains in 2017-2022 was 26,006.

== Surrounding area ==
- Shin-Ochanomizu Station
- Akihabara
- Jinbōchō
- Kanda River
- Kanda Shrine
- Manseibashi
- Yasukuni-dōri

== Connecting bus services ==
The Toei Bus operates local bus services from the following Ochanomizu Station bus stops.

Ochanomizu-ekimae (Ochanomizu Station)

No.1

- Cha 51: for Komagome-eki-minamiguchi (Komagome Station South Entrance)

No.2

- Cha 51: for Akihabara-ekimae (Akihabara Station)

No.3

- Higashi 43: for Tokyo-eki-Marunouchi-kitaguchi (Tokyo Station Marunouchi North Entrance)

No.4

- Higashi 43: for Arakawa-dote-sōshajō-mae (Arakawa Riverbank Depot) and Kōhoku-ekimae (Kōhoku Station)

Ochanomizu-ekimae (Higashi-guchi) (Ochanomizu Station (East Entrance))

No.5

- Gaku 07: for Tōdai-kōnai (The University of Tokyo Hongo Campus)

== See also ==
- List of railway stations in Japan
