= Awajichō Station =

Metro station in Tokyo, Japan

Coordinates: 35.69492°N 139.76746°E

Awajicho Station 淡路町駅

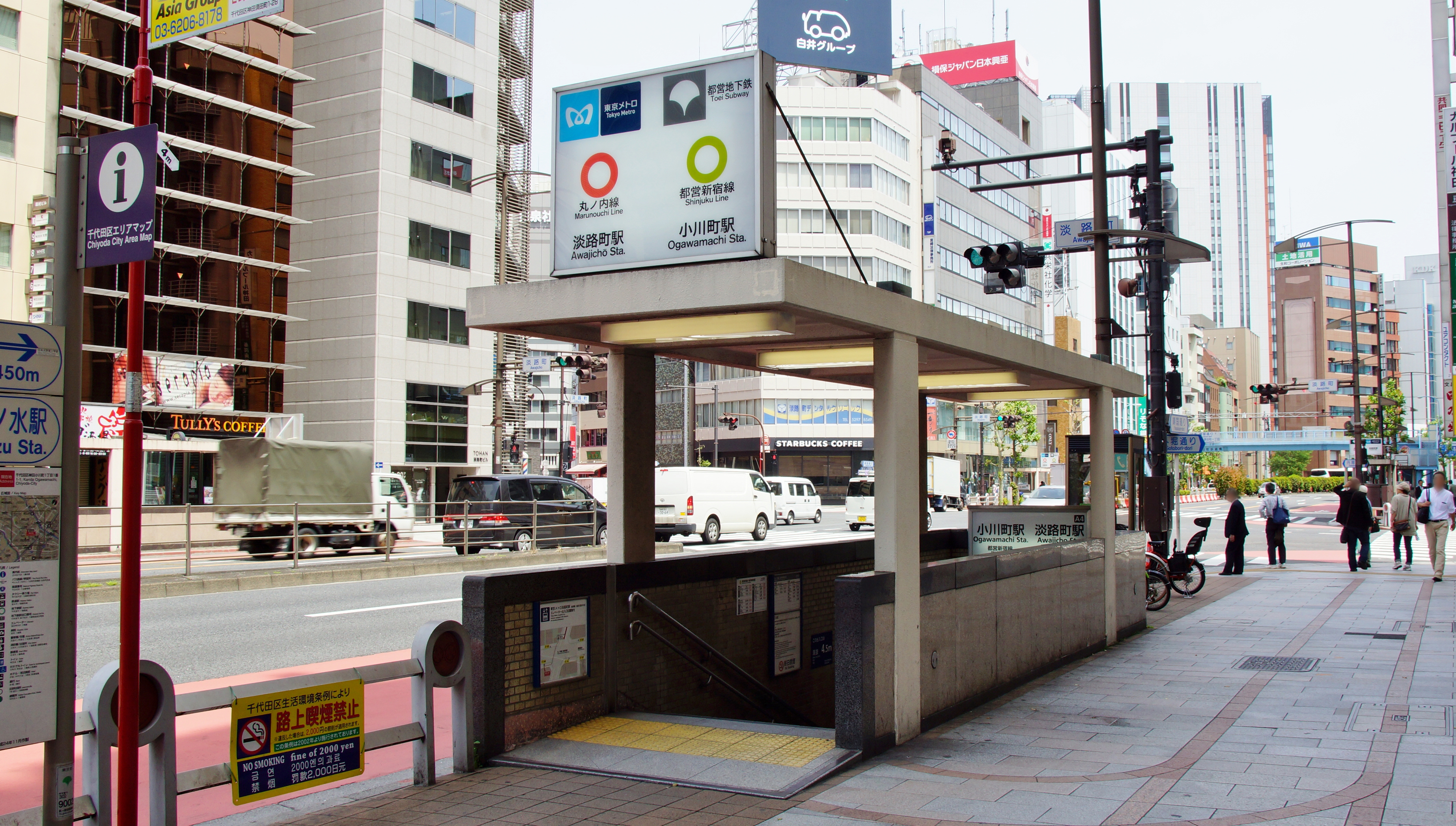
- Entrance A4 providing access to Awajicho and Ogawamachi Stations

General information
- Location: 1-2 Kanda-awajicho, Chiyoda, Tokyo 101-0063; Japan
- Operator: Tokyo Metro
- Line: Marunouchi Line
- Distance: 7.2 km (4.5 mi) from Ikebukuro
- Platforms: 2 side platforms
- Tracks: 2
- Connections: Ogawamachi; Shin-ochanomizu

Construction
- Structure type: Underground

Other information
- Station code: M-19
- Website: www.tokyometro.jp/station/awajicho/index.html

History
- Opened: 20 March 1956; 70 years ago

Services
Preceding station	Tokyo Metro	Following station
Ōtemachi towards Ogikubo or Hōnanchō	Marunouchi Line	Ochanomizu towards Ikebukuro
Location
- Location within Tokyo Yamanote Loop Location within Tokyo wards area Location within Japan

Awajicho Station (淡路町駅, Awajichō-eki) is a subway station numbered M-19 on the Tokyo Metro Marunouchi Line in Chiyoda, Tokyo, Japan, operated by the Tokyo subway operator Tokyo Metro.

== Lines ==
Awajicho Station is served by the Marunouchi Line, and is 7.2 km (4.5 mi) from northern terminus of the line at Ikebukuro.

The station offers underground passenger connections to Ogawamachi Station on the Shinjuku Line and Shin-Ochanomizu Station on the Chiyoda Line.

== Station layout ==
The station has two side platforms located on the basement ("B1F") level, serving two tracks. Platform 1 is accessed via entrances A1 to A3, while platform 2 is accessed via entrances A4 to A5. Passenger access between the two platforms is also provided via an underpass at the south end.

=== Platforms ===
1	Marunouchi Line	for Tokyo, Shinjuku, and Ogikubo
2	Marunouchi Line	for Ochanomizu and Ikebukuro

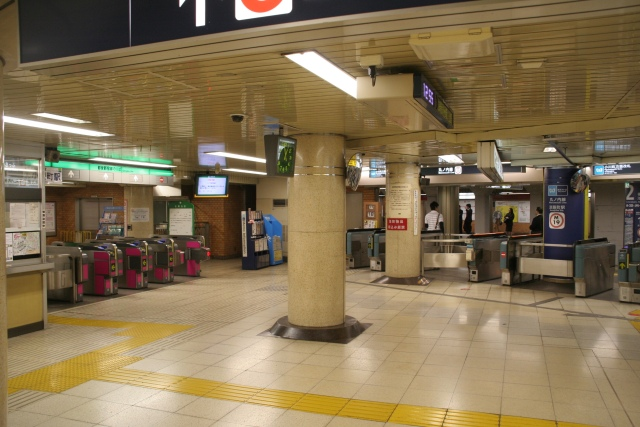
The west side ticket barriers next to the ticket barriers to Ogawamachi Station in May 2007

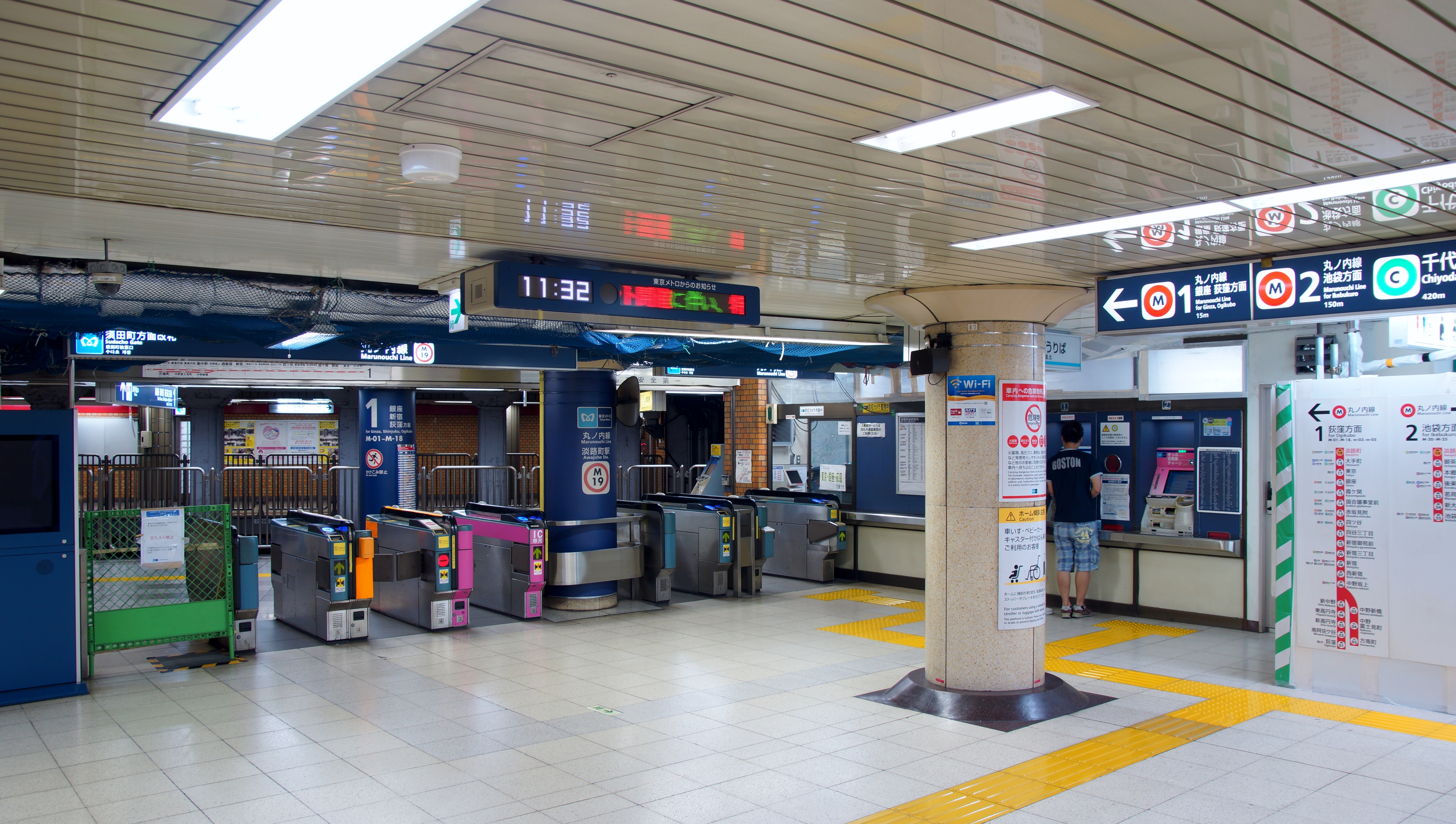
The Sudacho ticket barriers in May 2016

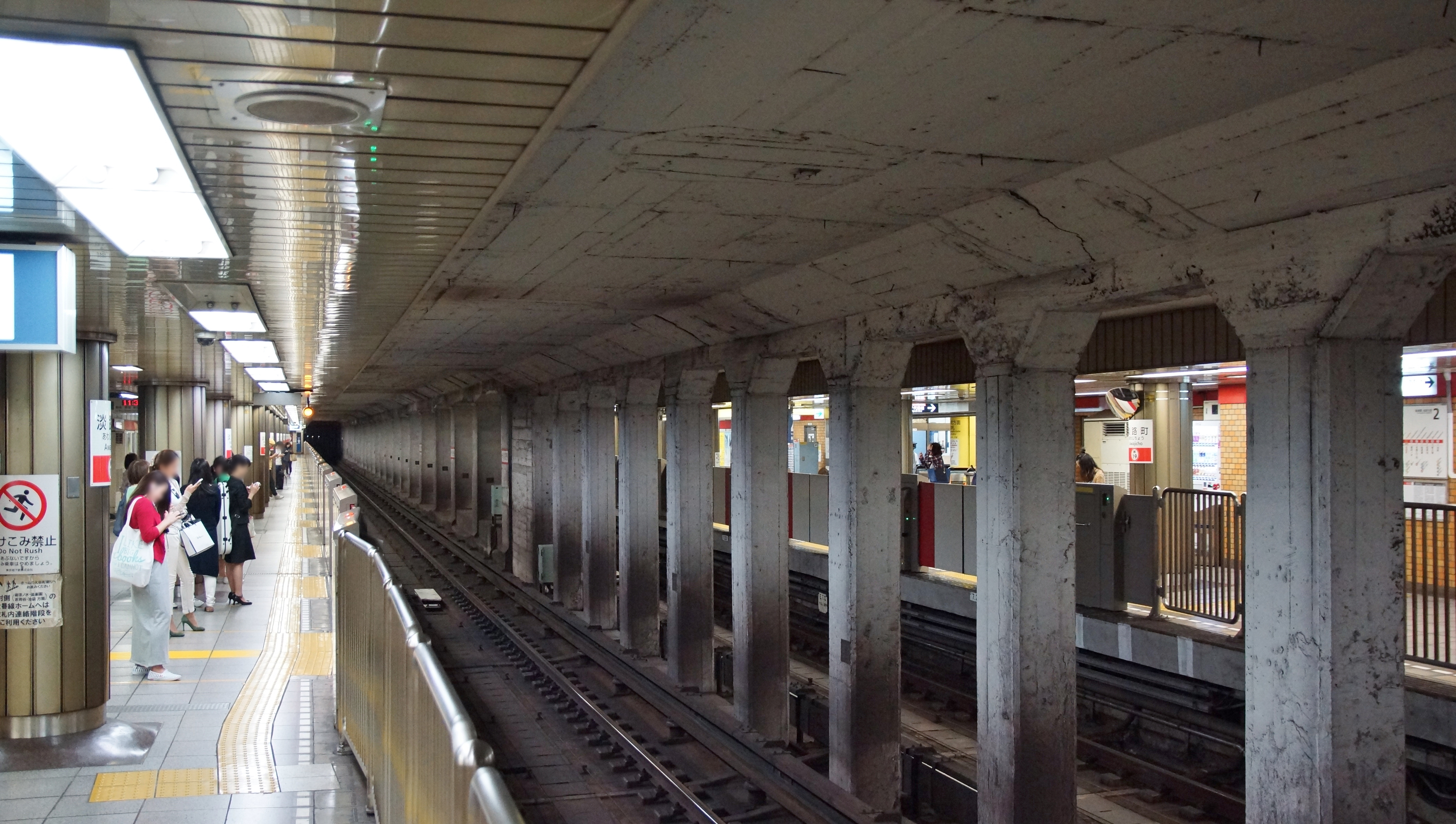
The platforms in May 2016

== History ==
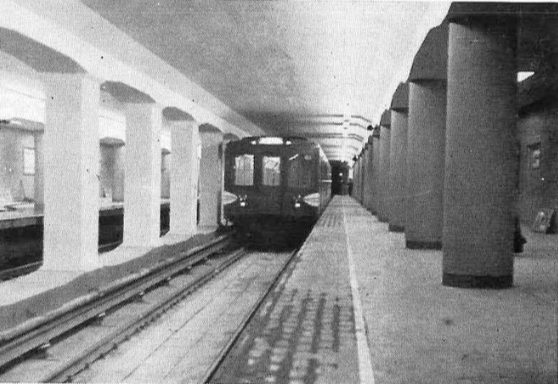
The station in 1956, operated by TRTA.

Awajicho Station opened on 20 March 1956.

The station facilities were inherited by Tokyo Metro after the privatization of the Teito Rapid Transit Authority (TRTA) in 2004.

== Passenger statistics ==
In fiscal 2014, the station was used by an average of 55,155 passengers daily.

== Surrounding area ==
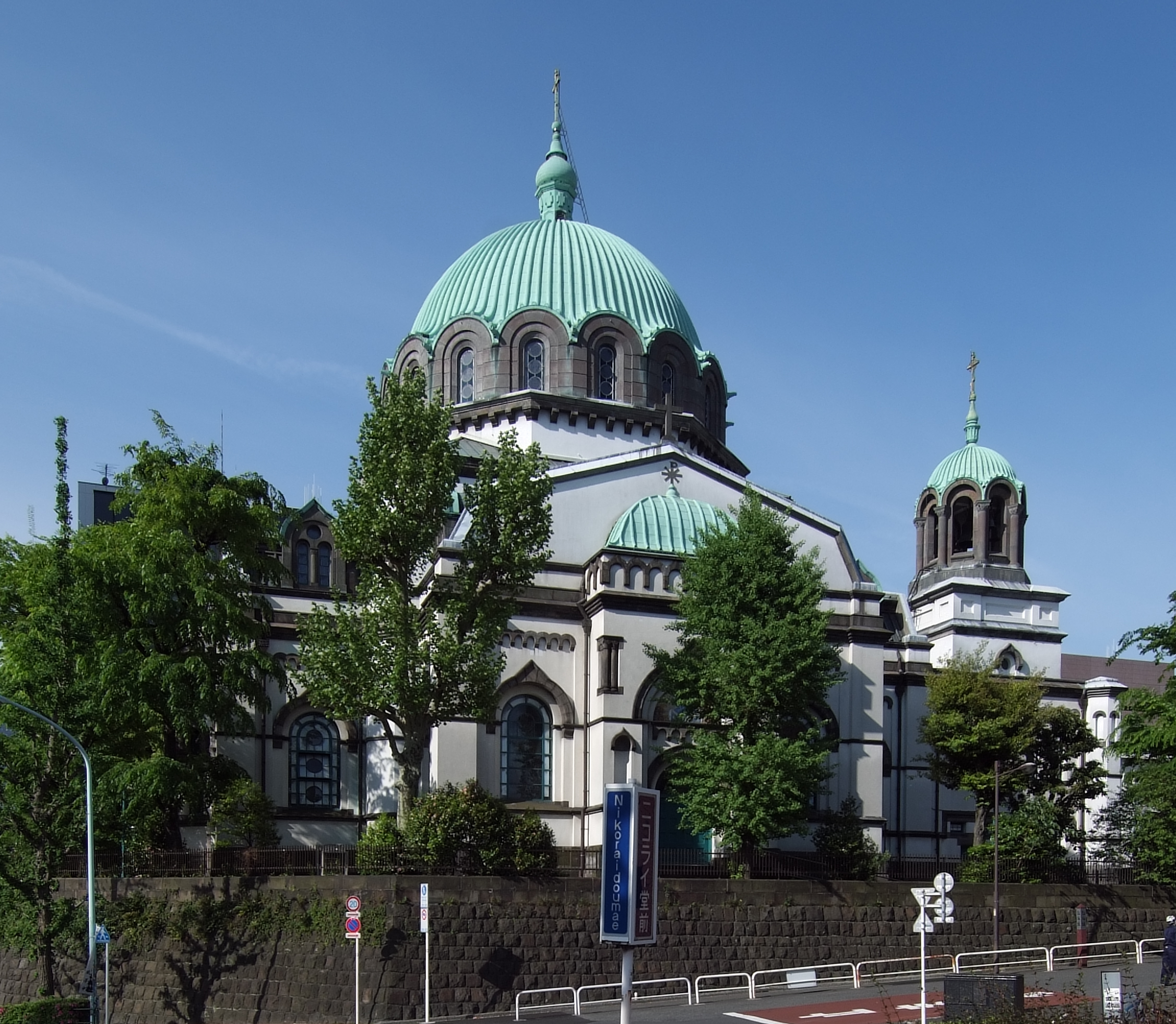
The nearby Holy Resurrection Cathedral

- Akihabara
- Holy Resurrection Cathedral
- Kanda River

=== Schools ===
- Meiji University
- Nihon University
- Chiyoda Elementary School

=== Other stations ===
- Ogawamachi Station ( Toei Shinjuku Line)
- Shin-Ochanomizu Station ( Tokyo Metro Chiyoda Line)
- Kanda Station
- Manseibashi Station (closed)

== See also ==
- List of railway stations in Japan
