= Ogawamachi Station (Tokyo) =

Metro station in Chiyoda, Tokyo, Japan

Ogawamachi Station 小川町駅

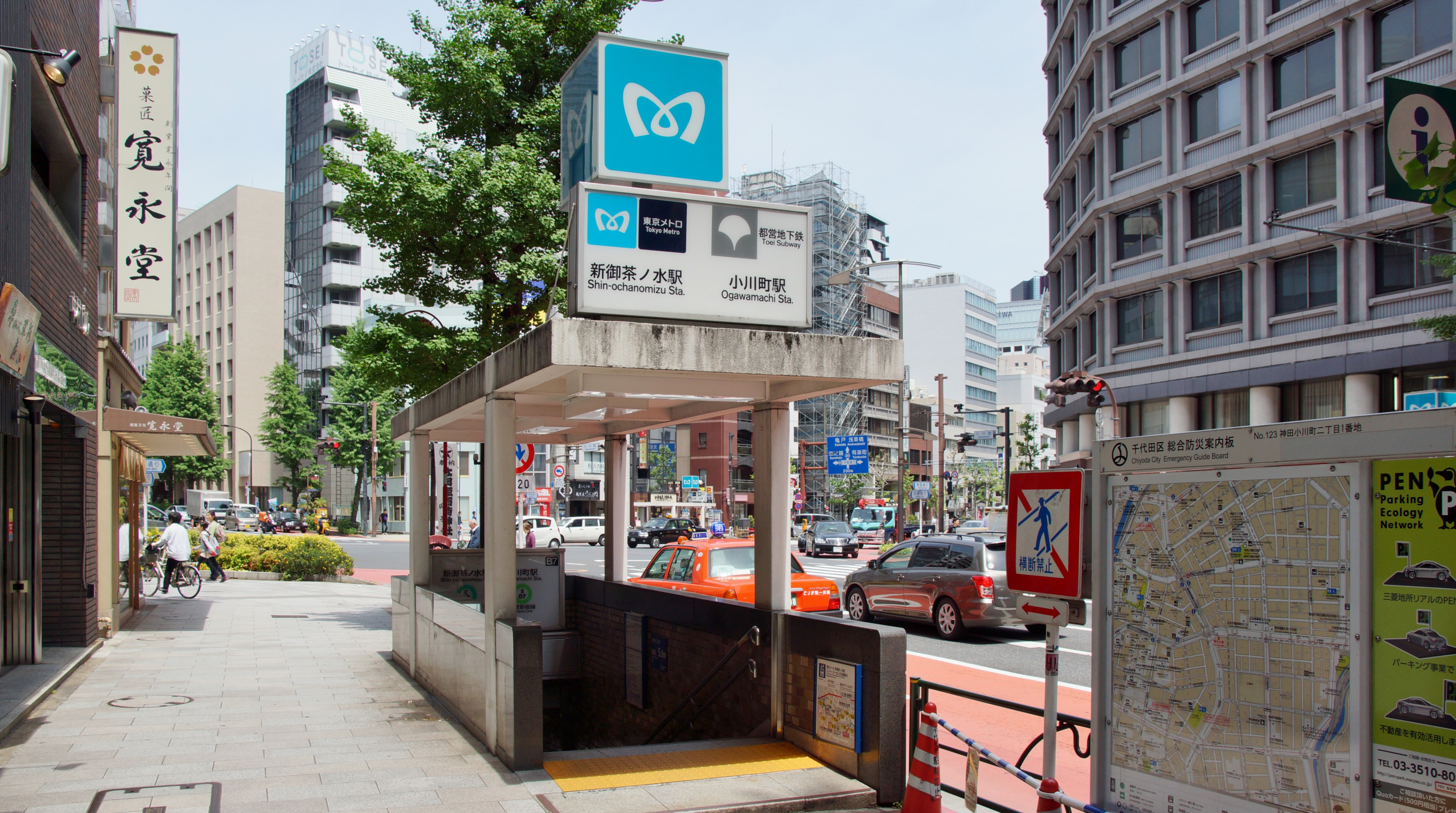
- Entrance B7 to Ogawamachi Station and Shin-Ochanomizu Station in May 2016

General information
- Location: 1-6 Kanda-Ogawamachi, Chiyoda City, Tokyo; Japan
- Coordinates: 35.69505°N 139.76667°E
- Operator: Toei Subway
- Line: Toei Shinjuku Line
- Distance: 6.5 km (4.0 mi) from Shinjuku
- Platforms: 1 island platform
- Tracks: 2
- Connections: Awajichō; Shin-Ochanomizu

Construction
- Structure type: Underground

Other information
- Station code: S-07
- Website: Official website

History
- Opened: 16 March 1980; 46 years ago

Passengers
- FY2011: 64,205 daily

Services
Preceding station	Toei Subway	Following station
Jimbocho towards Shinjuku	Shinjuku Line Local	Iwamotocho towards Motoyawata
Location
- Location within Tokyo Yamanote Loop Location within Tokyo wards area Location within Japan

Ogawamachi Station (小川町駅, Ogawamachi-eki) is a subway station in Chiyoda, Tokyo, Japan, operated by the Tokyo subway operator Tokyo Metropolitan Bureau of Transportation (Toei). The station opened on March 16, 1980.

== Lines ==
Ogawamachi Station is served by the Toei Shinjuku Line, and is located 6.5 km from Shinjuku Station. The station is numbered "S-07". It is connected to Awajichō Station on the Tokyo Metro Marunouchi Line and Shin-Ochanomizu Station on the Tokyo Metro Chiyoda Line via underground passages. It is also relatively close to Kanda Station on the Tokyo Metro Ginza Line (around 300 meters to the east), although it is not officially recognized as a transfer station and there is no transfer corridor between the two stations.

== Layout ==
Ogawamachi Station has a single island platform on the forth basement ("B4F") level, serving two tracks. The platform numbers are continuous with the neighboring Awajichō Station and are numbered platform 3 and 4.

=== Platforms ===
3	Shinjuku Line	for Jimbocho and Shinjuku; Keio Line for Sasazuka and Hashimoto
4	Shinjuku Line	for Bakuro-yokoyama and Motoyawata

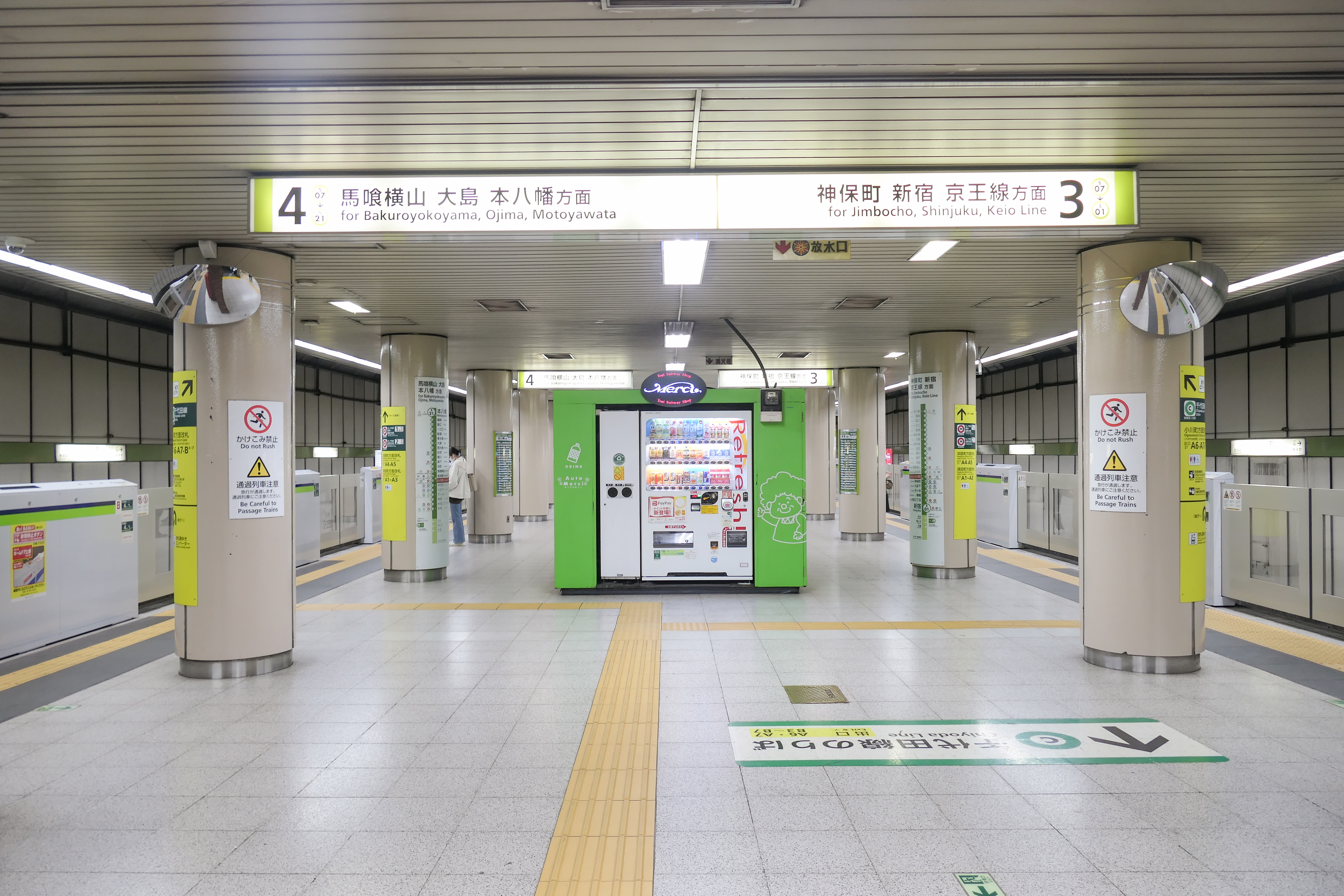
The platforms

== History ==
The station opened on 16 March 1980.

== Passenger statistics ==
In fiscal 2011, the station was used by an average of 64,205 passengers daily.

== Surrounding area ==
The station is located underneath Tokyo Metropolitan Route 302 (Yasukuni-dōri) between Tokyo Metropolitan Routes 403 (Hongō-dōri) and 405 (Sotobori-dōri). The area is home to many mid-rise office buildings and scattered apartment buildings. Other points of interest include:

- Tokyo Metropolitan Police Department, Kanda Police Station
- Chiyoda City Hall, Kanda Park branch office
- Chiyoda Municipal Chiyoda Elementary School
- Kanda-Awajichō & Kanda-Nishikimachi post offices
- Tokyo Denki University
  - School of Engineering
  - School of Science and Technology for Future Life

== See also ==
- List of railway stations in Japan
- Ogawamachi Station (Saitama)
