= Satoshi Yagisawa (writer) =

Japanese novelist (born 1977)

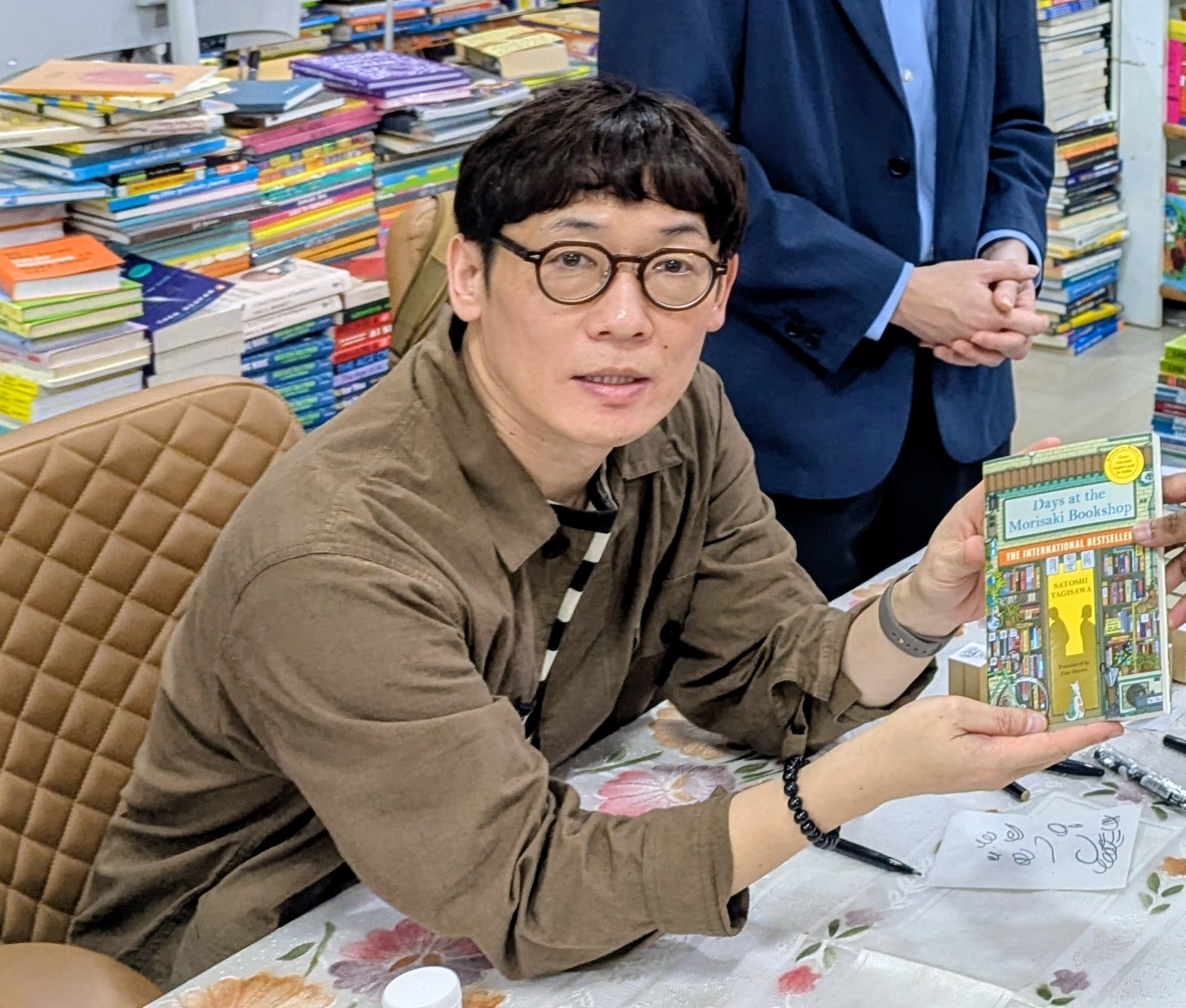
- Yagisawa in Bengaluru in 2026, with his book, Days at the Morisaki Bookshop
- Born: 1977 (age 48–49); Chiba Prefecture, Japan
- Education: Nihon University
- Writing career
- Notable work: Days at the Morisaki Bookshop
- Notable awards: Chiyoda Literature Prize (2009)
- Website: yagisawa-satoshi.com

Satoshi Yagisawa (八木沢 里志, born 1977) is a Japanese author. He is best known for his debut novel, Days at the Morisaki Bookshop, which became an international bestseller and was adapted into a film.

== Early life ==
Satoshi Yagisawa was born in Chiba Prefecture, Japan, in 1977. He graduated from Nihon University's College of Art. Prior to his success as a novelist, Yagisawa worked various jobs.

== Literary career ==
In 2009, Yagisawa won the Chiyoda Literature Prize for his story Morisaki Shoten no Hibi (Days at the Morisaki Bookshop). Set in the Kanda-Jinbōchō district of Tokyo, known for its high concentration of second-hand bookstores, the novel follows a young woman named Takako who moves into her uncle's bookshop following a difficult breakup. Yagisawa has stated that he does not follow literary trends, preferring to write stories that focus on the "small happinesses" of daily life and human connection.

The novel's success led to a 2010 film adaptation directed by Asako Hyuga. Though originally published over a decade prior, the book gained significant global popularity in the 2020s through social media platforms like BookTok, leading to translations in over twenty languages.

== Personal life ==
Yagisawa's writing is often informed by his personal experiences. He lives a slow life with his wife and cat and gets inspiration from the tiny changes in the world and his own mood.

== Works ==
Title	Original Release Date	English Release Date
Days at the Morisaki Bookshop 森崎書店の日々 Morisaki Shoten no Hibi	September 07, 2010 978-4094085457	July 4, 2023 978-0063278677
More Days at the Morisaki Bookshop 続・森崎書店の日々 Zoku Morisaki Shoten no Hibi	December 06, 2011 978-4094086720	July 2, 2024 978-0063278714
Days at the Torunka Café 純喫茶トルンカ Junkissa Torunka	November 01, 2013 978-4198937669	November 4, 2025 978-0063445857
More Days at the Torunka Café: The Scent of Happiness しあわせの香り 純喫茶トルンカ Shiawase no Kaori Junkissa Torunka	February 06, 2015 978-4198939151	30 July, 2026 978-0063445895
きみと暮らせば Kimi to Kuraseba	December 03, 2015 978-4198940508	
純喫茶トルンカ 新装版 Junkissa Torunka Shinsouban	June 08, 2022 978-4198947514	
しあわせの香り 純喫茶トルンカ 新装版 Shiawase no Kaori Junkissa Torunka Shinsouban	January 12, 2023 978-4198948153	
きみと暮らせば 新装版 Kimi to Kuraseba Shinsouban	May 12, 2023 978-4198948542	
眠れぬ夜のご褒美（アンソロジー） Nemurenu Yoru no Gohoubi (Ansorojii)	July 04, 2024 978-4591182260	
純喫茶トルンカ 最高の一杯 Junkissa Torunka Saikou no Ippai	October 11, 2024 978-4198949709	
新装版 森崎書店の日々 Shinsouban Morisaki Shoten no Hibi	October 29, 2025 978-4093867658	
新装版 続・森崎書店の日々 Shinsouban Zoku Morisaki Shoten no Hibi	November 26, 2025 978-4093867665	
