= Yuhikaku Publishing =

Japanese publishing company

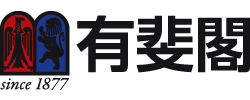
- Status: Active
- Founded: 1877
- Founder: Egusa Onotarō
- Country of origin: Japan
- Headquarters location: Tokyo
- Distribution: Japan
- Publication types: Books and journals
- Nonfiction topics: Social science and humanities
- No. of employees: 100
- Official website: http://www.yuhikaku.co.jp

Yuhikaku Publishing Co., Ltd. (株式会社 有斐閣, Kabushiki-gaisha Yūhikaku) is a Japanese publishing company known as a specialist legal publisher. It has been run by the Egusa family since its foundation in 1877, headquartered in Kanda-Jinbōchō, Tokyo.
