= Kudanshita Station =

Metro station in Tokyo, Japan

Kudanshita Station 九段下駅

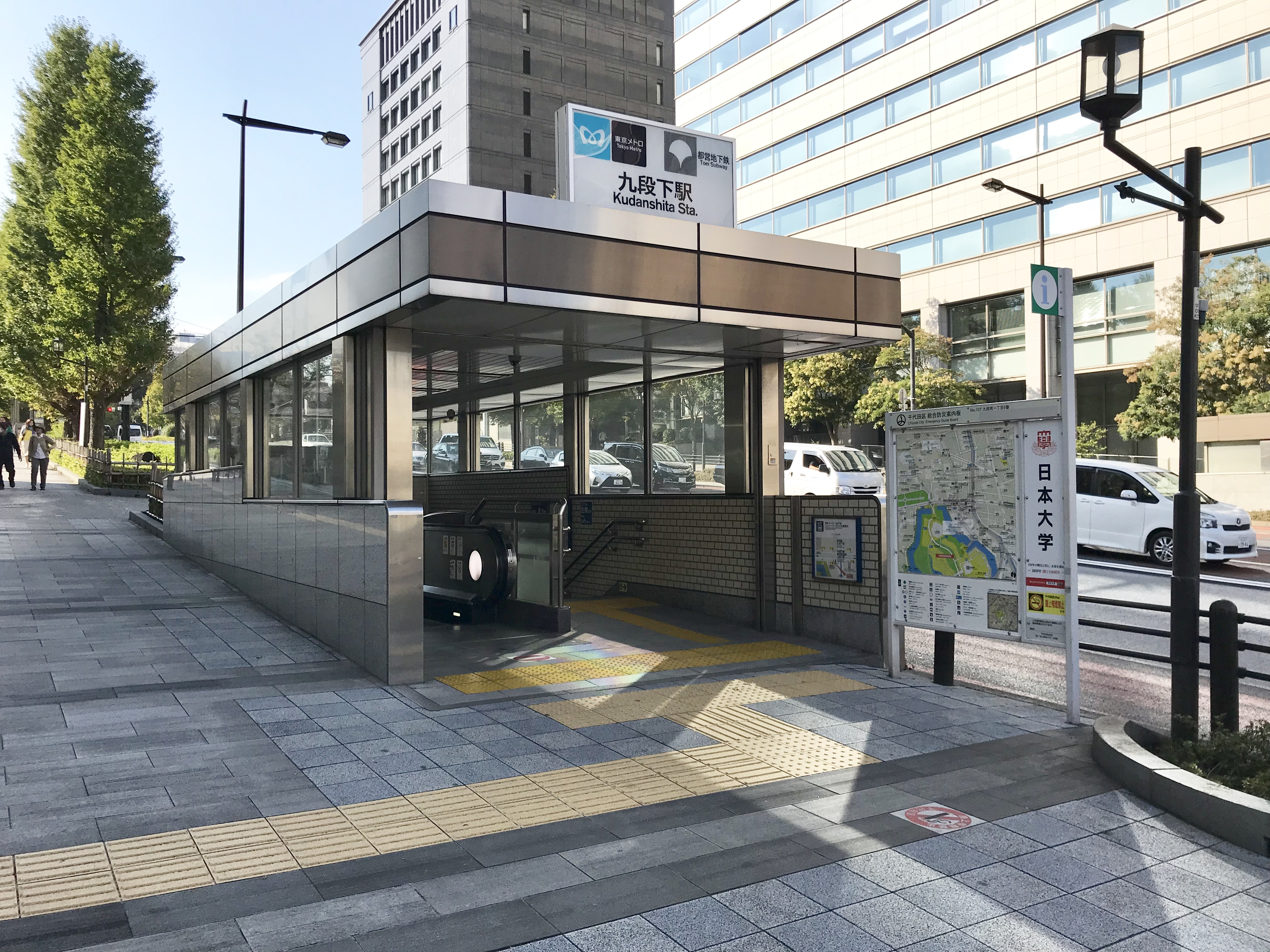
- No. 4 entrance in November 2018

General information
- Location: 1-6-1 Kudan-minami (Tokyo Metro); 1-13-19 Kudan-kita (Toei Subway); Chiyoda, Tokyo; Japan
- Coordinates: 35.6954°N 139.7514°E
- System: Tokyo subway
- Owner: Tokyo Metro Co., Ltd. Tokyo Metropolitan Government
- Operator: Tokyo Metro; Toei Subway
- Lines: Shinjuku Line; Hanzōmon Line; Tōzai Line
- Platforms: 2 side platforms (Tozai Line), 1 island platform and 2 side platforms (Hanzōmon/Shinjuku Line)
- Tracks: 2 (Tozai Line), 4 (Hanzōmon/Shinjuku Line)

Construction
- Structure type: Underground

Other information
- Station code: S-05, T-07, Z-06

History
- Opened: 23 December 1964; 61 years ago

Passengers
- FY2024: 201,105 (daily)

Services
Preceding station	Tokyo Metro	Following station
Iidabashi towards Nakano	Tōzai Line Rapid Commuter Rapid Local	Takebashi towards Nishi-Funabashi
Hanzōmon towards Shibuya	Hanzōmon Line	Jimbocho towards Oshiage
Preceding station	Toei Subway	Following station
Ichigaya towards Shinjuku	Shinjuku Line Local	Jimbocho towards Motoyawata
Location
- Location within Tokyo Yamanote Loop Location within Tokyo wards area Location within Japan

Kudanshita Station (九段下駅, Kudanshita-eki) is a subway station in Chiyoda, Tokyo, Japan, jointly operated by Tokyo Metro and Toei Subway.

== Lines ==
Kudanshita Station is served by the following three subway lines.

- Toei Shinjuku Line (S-05)
- Tokyo Metro Hanzōmon Line (Z-06)
- Tokyo Metro Tozai Line (T-07)

== Station layout ==
The underground station is built on three main levels, with the Tōzai Line platforms located on the 2nd basement level and the Shinjuku Line and Hanzōmon Line platforms on the 4th basement level.

=== Platforms ===
The Tōzai Line platforms consist of two side platforms running approximately north–south. The Shinjuku Line and Hanzōmon Line platforms on the 4th basement level were originally configured as two sets of side platforms running approximately east–west parallel to each other. From 16 March 2013, the separating wall between these platforms was removed, allowing cross-platform interchange between platform 4 (Hanzōmon Line Oshiage-bound) and platform 5 (Shinjuku Line Shinjuku-bound).

1	Tōzai Line	for Ōtemachi, Tōyōchō, Nishi-Funabashi; Chuo-Sobu Line for Tsudanuma; Toyo Rapid Railway Line for Tōyō-Katsutadai
2	Tozai Line	for Nakano; Chuo-Sobu Line for Mitaka
3	Hanzōmon Line	for Shibuya; Den-en-toshi Line for Nagatsuta and Chūō-Rinkan
4	Hanzōmon Line	for Otemachi, Oshiage; Tobu Skytree Line for Kita-Koshigaya and Tōbu-Dōbutsu-Kōen; Tobu Isesaki Line for Kuki; Tōbu Nikkō Line for Minami-Kurihashi
5	Shinjuku Line	for Shinjuku; Keio Line for Hatsudai, Hatagaya, Sasazuka, Meidaimae, Chōfu, and Hashimoto
6	Shinjuku Line	for Jimbocho, Ōjima, and Moto-Yawata

The song "Under the Big Onion" (大きな玉ねぎの下で, Ookina Tamanegi no Shita de) by the band Bakufū Slump is used as the departure melody for the Tōzai Line platforms in 2015.

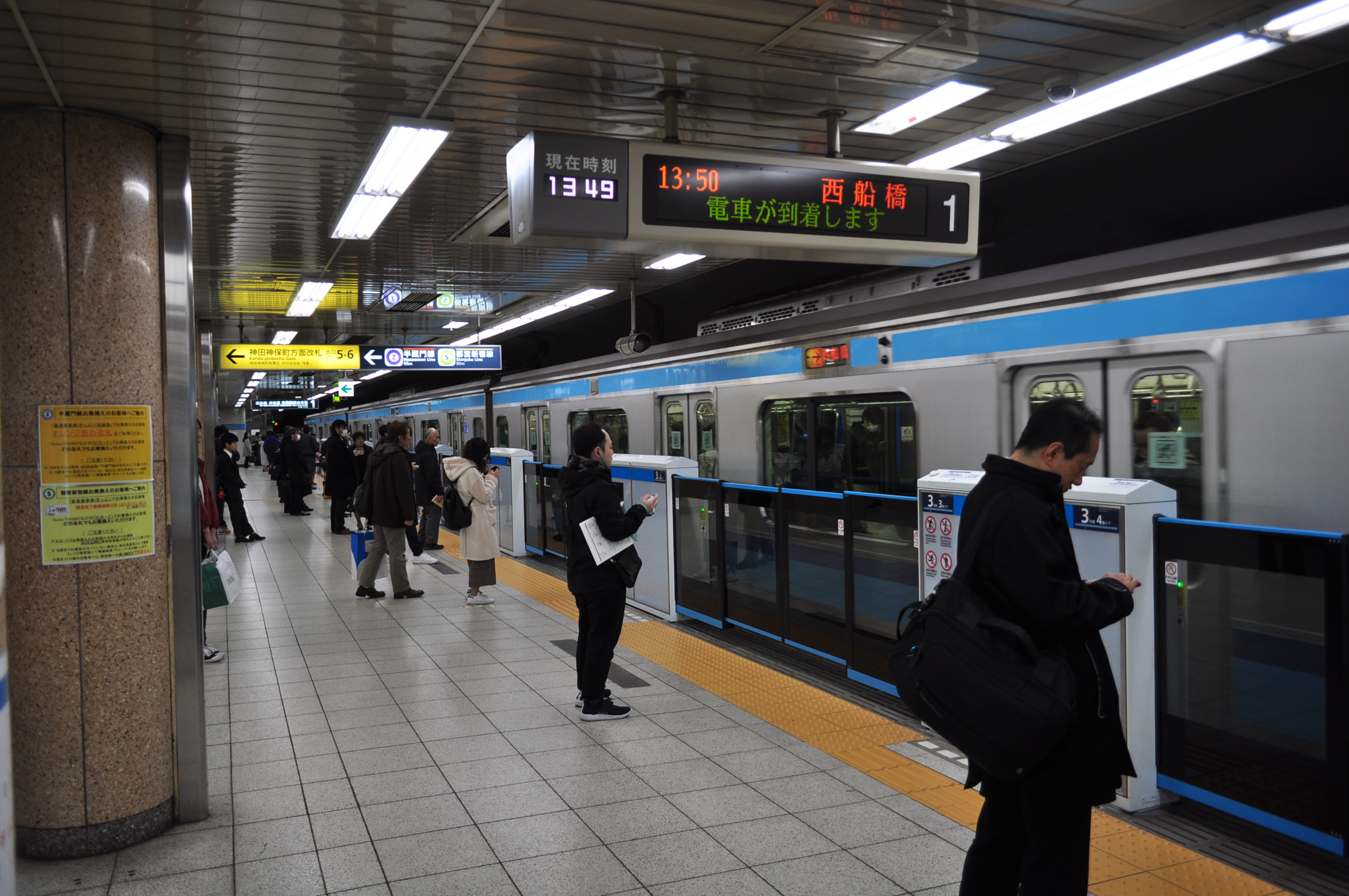
Tozai Line platforms, 2018

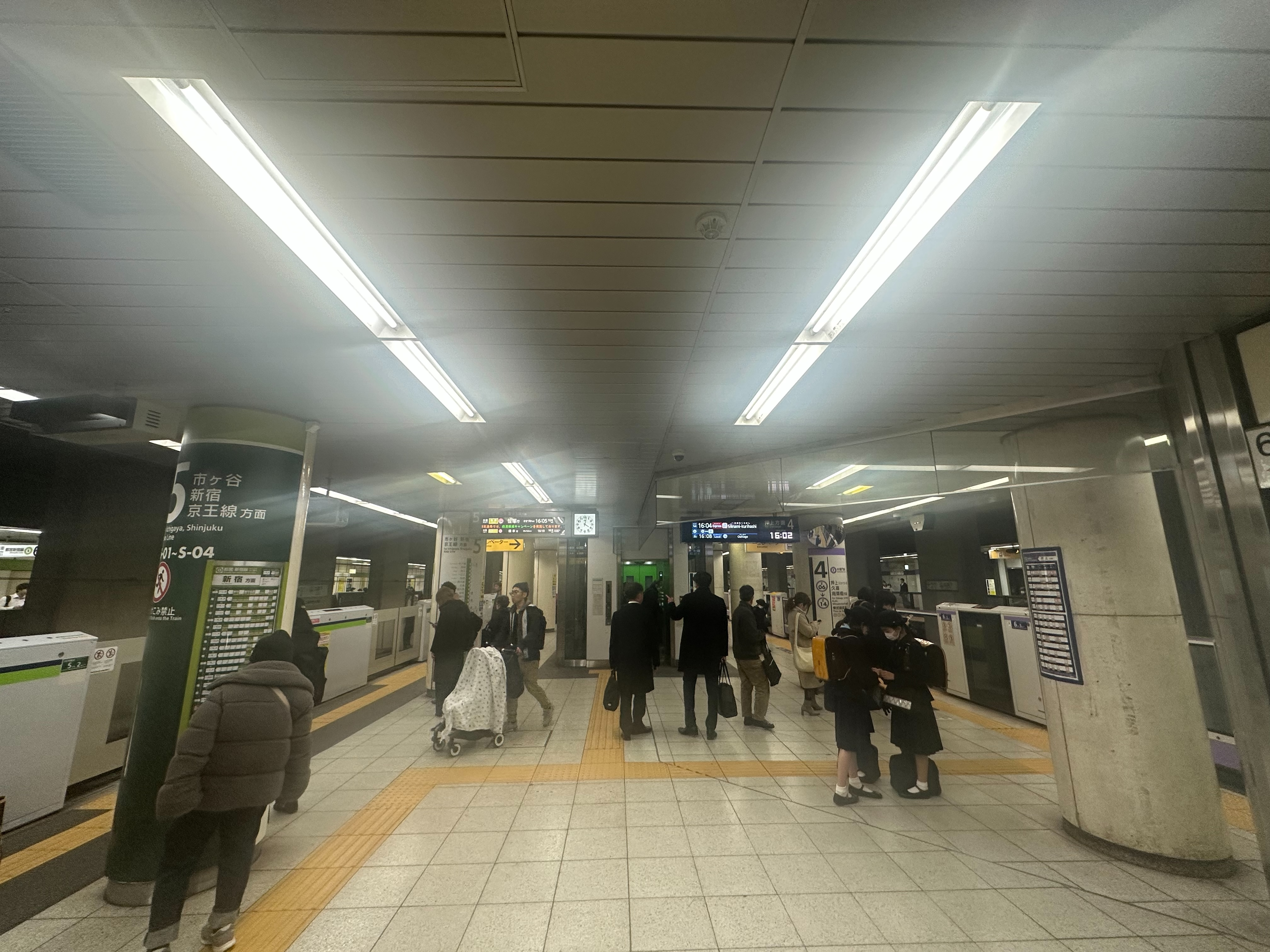
Cross-platform interchange between the Hanzōmon Line and Shinjuku Line in February 2024

== History ==
The station opened on 23 December 1964 as the eastern terminus of the Tozai Line from Takadanobaba. The Shinjuku Line platforms opened on 16 March 1980, and the Hanzomon Line platforms on 26 January 1989.

The station facilities of the Hanzomon and Tozai Lines were inherited by Tokyo Metro after the privatization of the Teito Rapid Transit Authority (TRTA) in 2004.

Work commenced on removing the separating wall between the parallel Tokyo Metro Hanzomon Line and Toei Shinjuku Line platforms (4 and 5) in 2012, allowing cross-platform interchange from 16 March 2013.

== Surrounding area ==
This is the closest subway station to Yasukuni Shrine and Nippon Budokan.

== See also ==
- List of railway stations in Japan
