= Jimbōchō Book Town =

Book town in Kanda-Jinbōchō, Tokyo, Japan

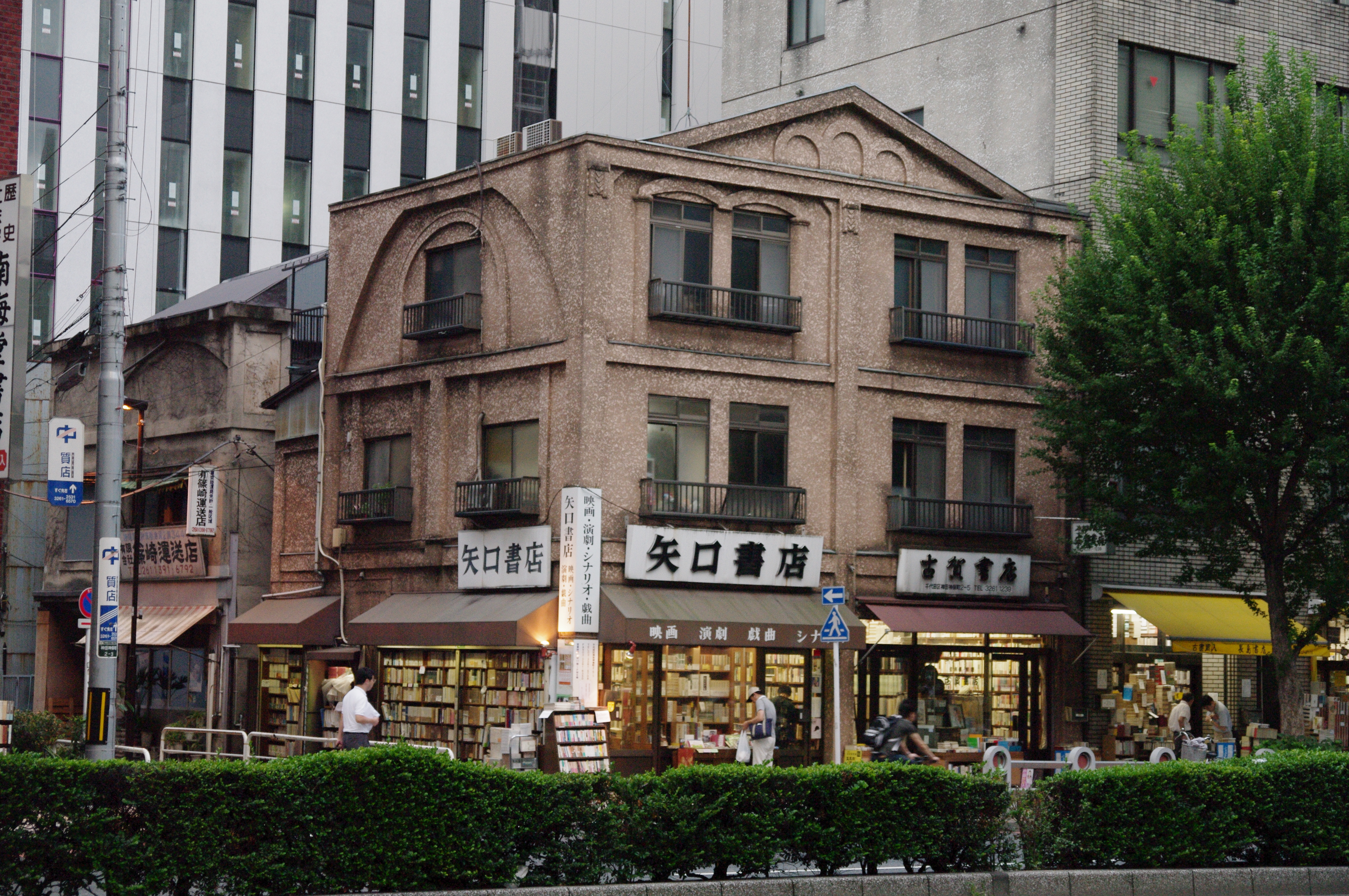
Used bookstores in Jimbōchō Book Town

Jimbōchō Book Town (Japanese: 神田神保町古書街, Hepburn: Kanda Jinbōchō Koshogai; alternately Jinbōchō Book Town) and also known as Kanda Book Town (Japanese: 神田古書店街, Hepburn: Kanda Koshoten Gai), is a book town located in the district of Kanda-Jinbōchō in Chiyoda, Tokyo, Japan. The area is known for its high volume and concentration of used bookstores. It additionally houses the headquarters for multiple major Japanese publishing companies, as well as campuses for several universities.

== History ==
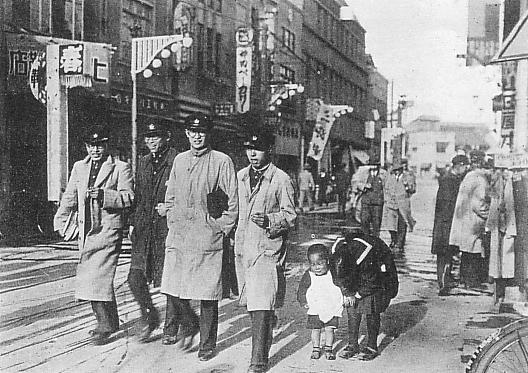
University students in Jimbōchō Book Town, c. 1930

Multiple universities and schools established campuses around Jinbōchō, Tokyo following the Meiji Restoration in 1868, including the University of Tokyo, the Gakushuin, Tokyo Women's Normal School, and Senshu College, among others. The presence of these institutions attracted bookstores catering to university professors and students that sold textbooks and other academic reference materials.

The area continued as a primarily student district until the 1930s, a decade that saw the development of a robust secondhand book market across Japan. This was motivated by the production of so-called one yen books – paperbacks that could be cheaply produced on a mass scale, and which significantly widened the availability of books among the general Japanese public. One yen books were published in a range of categories and genres (such as literature, reference books, and manga) and flowed into the secondhand book market, promoting the development of secondhand bookstores in Japan generally and Jimbōchō Book Town specifically. Stores selling rare and specialty titles began to proliferate in Jimbōchō Book Town in the 1950s.

In 2009, there were roughly 150 second-hand bookstores in Jimbōchō Book Town; as of 2021, the Kanda Bookstore Federation reports that Jimbōchō Book Town has 176 used bookstores, constituting roughly one-third of all secondhand bookstores in Japan. The rise of online shopping for books in the 2010s led to a reported decline in customers at stores in Jimbōchō Book Town; these pressures have been exacerbated by the COVID-19 pandemic, which in 2020 forced the temporary closure of approximately 90 percent of the neighborhood's bookstores.

== Notable establishments ==
Jimbōchō Book Town houses the headquarters of multiple major Japanese publishing companies including Shogakukan, Shueisha, and Iwanami Shoten, the lattermost of which established its headquarters in Jimbōchō Book Town in 1913 and also operates its flagship bookstore in the area. Several other publishing companies operate flagship bookstores in Jimbōchō Book Town, notably Sanseido Bookstore and Shosen Grande. Multiple universities continue to operate campuses in the area, including Nihon University, Meiji University, Hosei University, Juntendo University, and Senshu University.

== Location and transportation access ==
Book Town is concentrated along Yasukuni-dori Avenue between the Surugadaishita and Sendai-mae intersections, and along Hakusan-dori Avenue between the Jimbōchō intersection and Suidōbashi Station. The area is served by Ochanomizu Station (connecting to the JR Chūō Rapid and Chūō-Sōbu lines) and Jimbōchō Station (connecting to the Toei Shinjuku and Mita lines, and the Tokyo Metro Hanzōmon line).

== Gallery ==
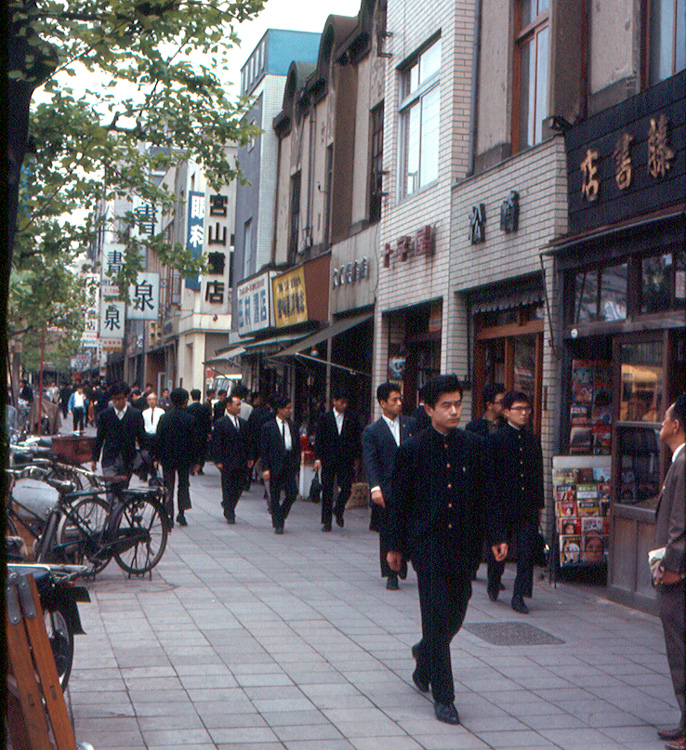
Streets of Jimbōchō Book Town in 1967

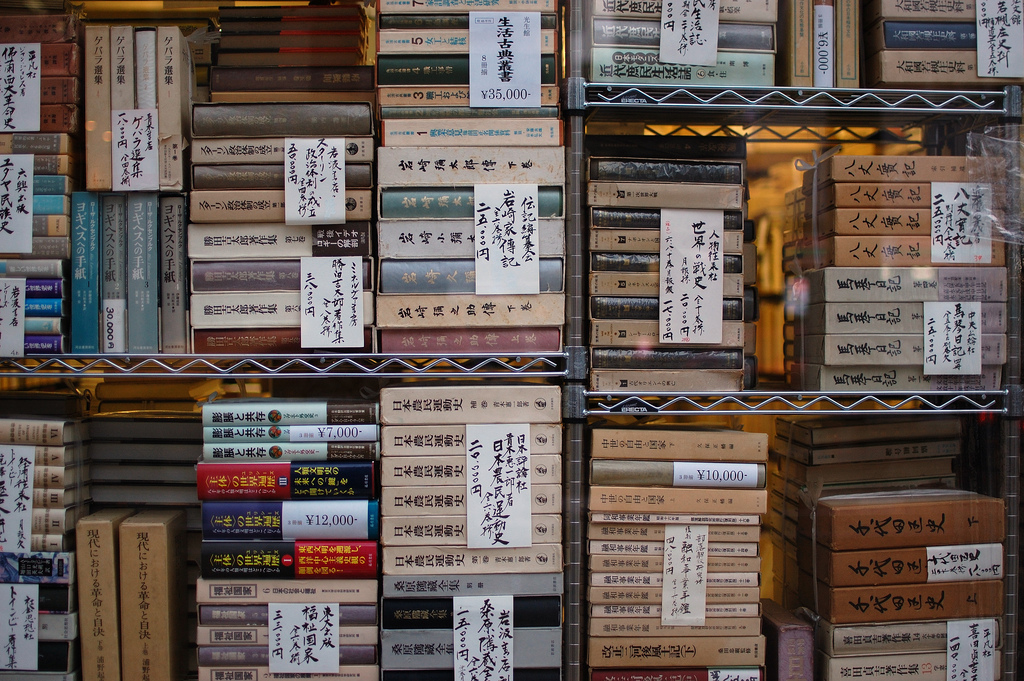
Shelves of used books at a store in Jimbōchō Book Town

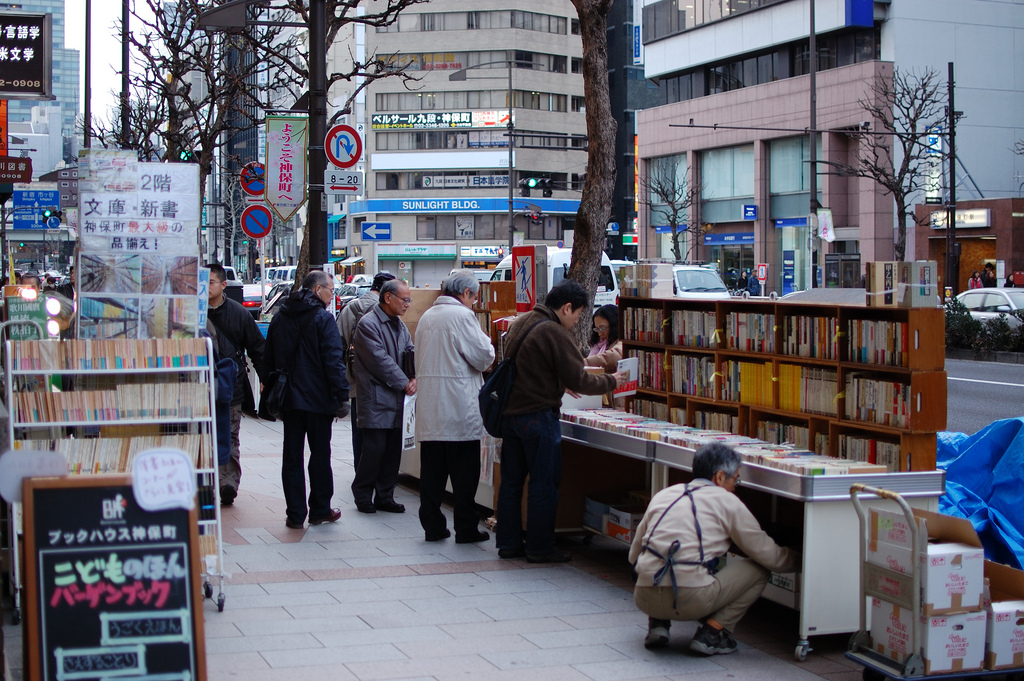
Sidewalk book shelves at a store in Jimbōchō Book Town

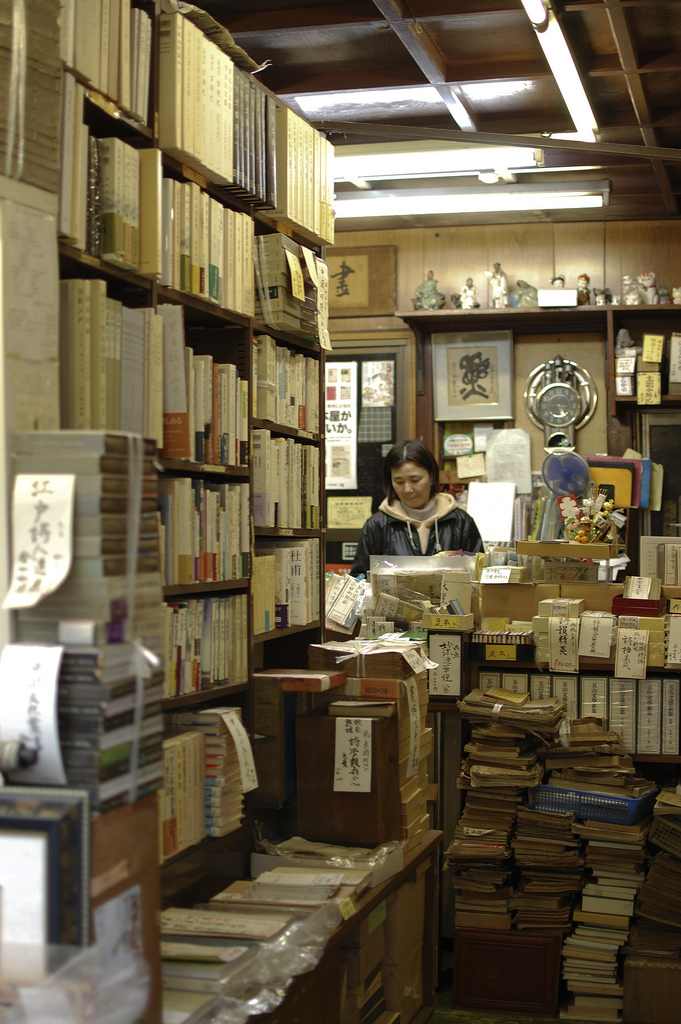
Interior of a store in Jimbōchō Book Town

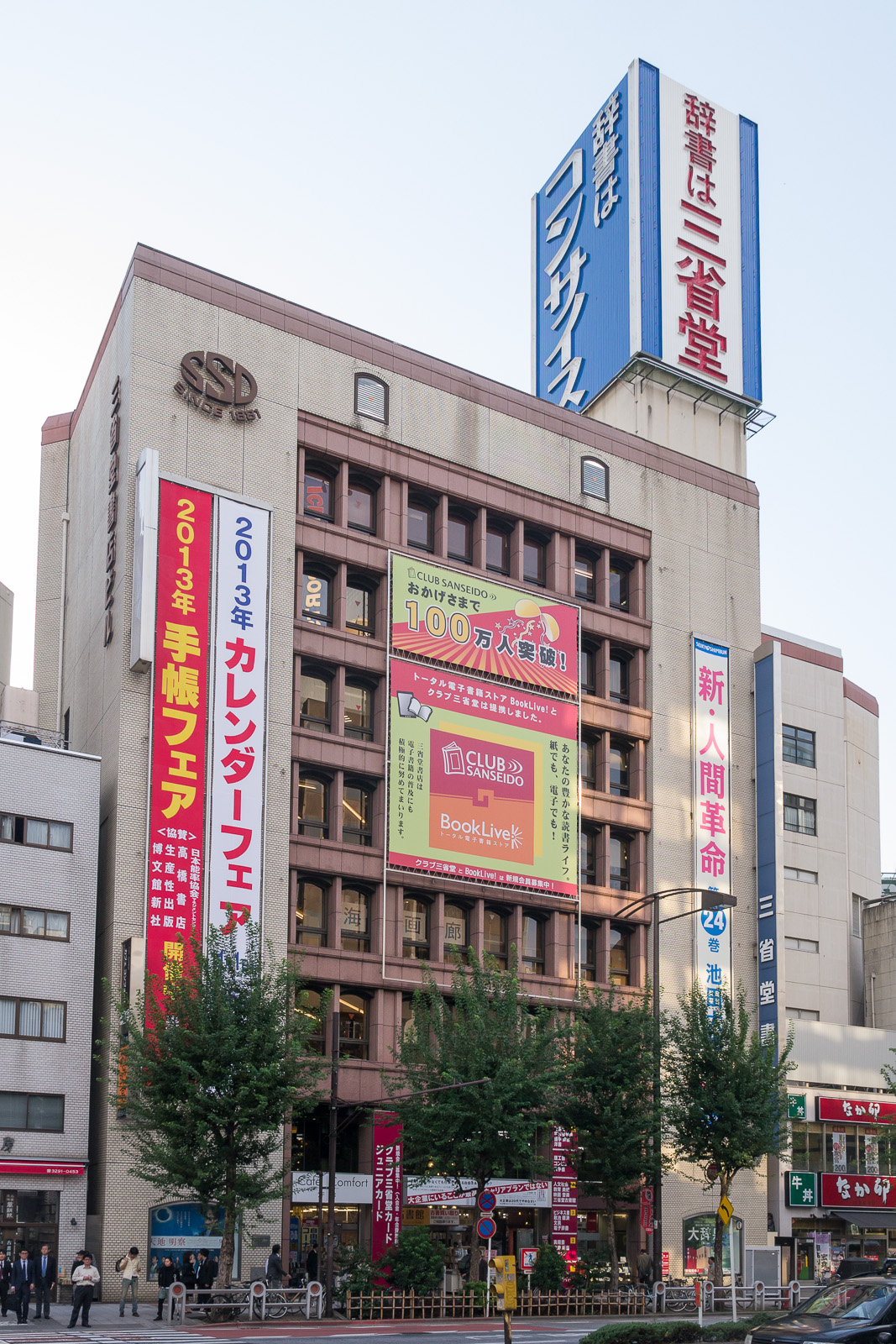
Sanseido Bookstore flagship store in Jimbōchō Book Town

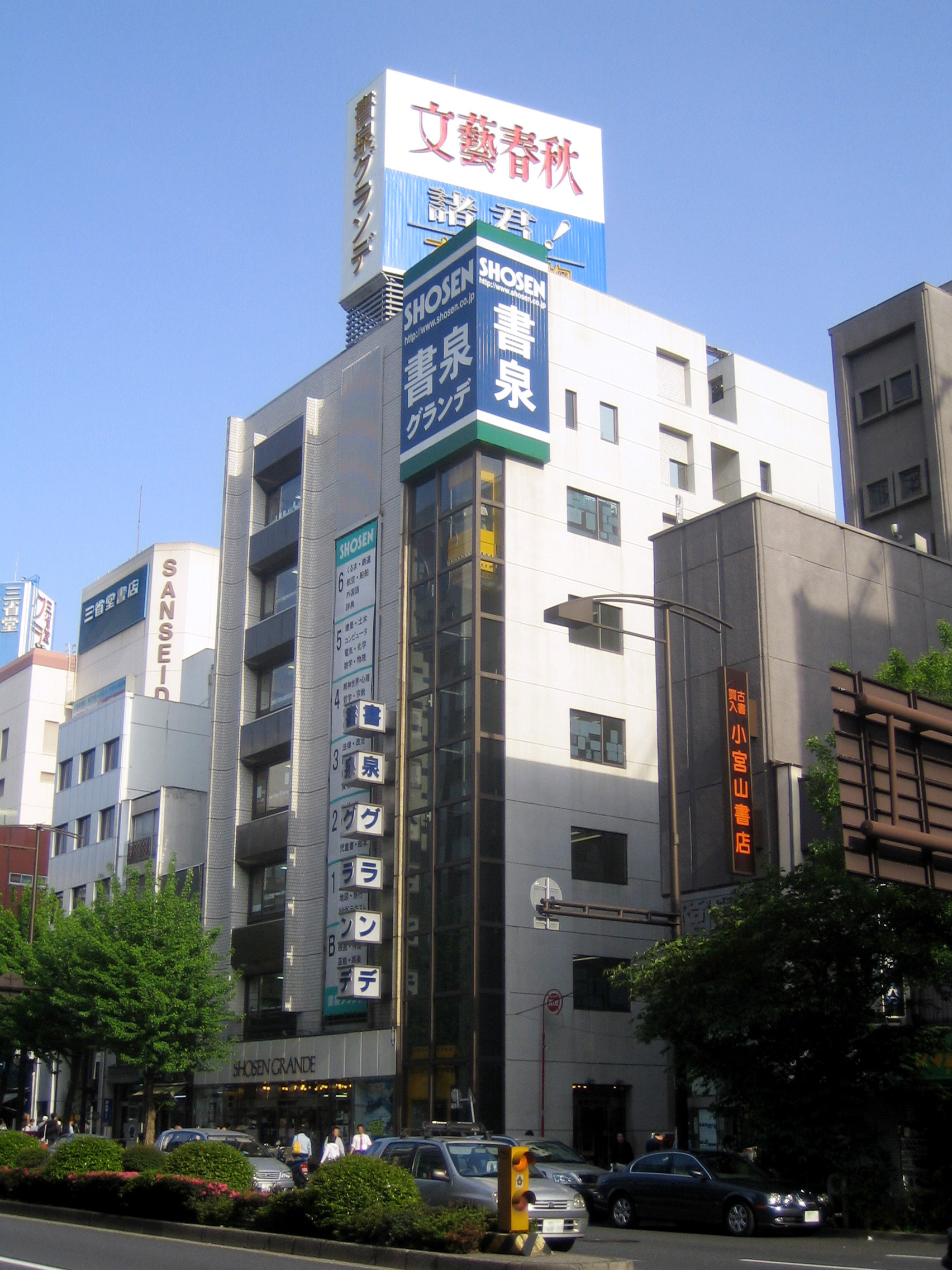
Shosen Grande
