= Jimbōchō Station =

Metro station in Tokyo, Japan

Jimbocho Station 神保町駅

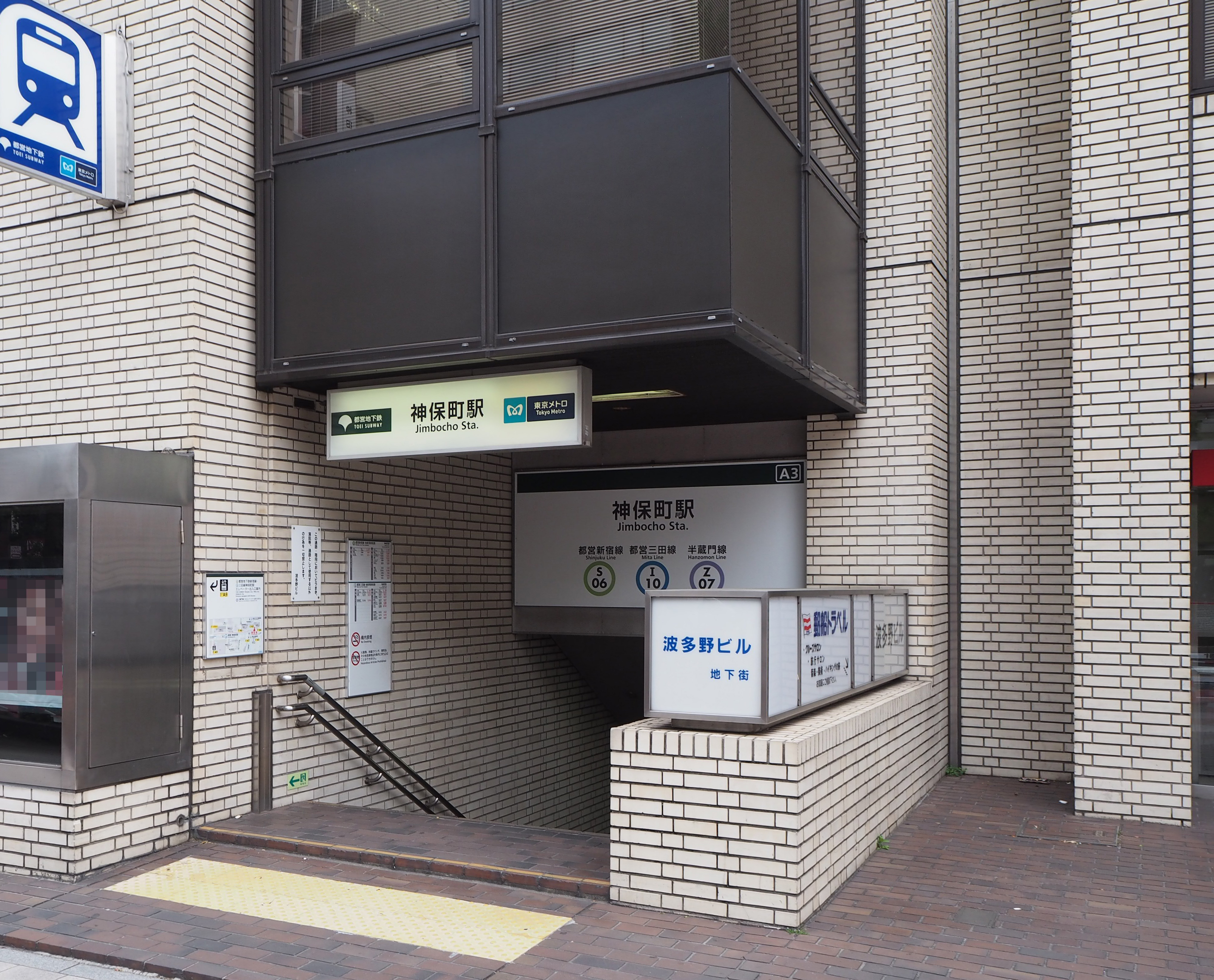
- Entrance A3 in May 2015

General information
- Location: 2 Jimbōchō, Kanda, Chiyoda-ku, Tokyo; Japan
- Coordinates: 35.6959°N 139.7577°E
- Operator: Toei Subway; Tokyo Metro
- Lines: Mita Line; Shinjuku Line; Hanzōmon Line
- Platforms: 1 island platform (Mita & Hanzōmon Lines), 2 side platforms (Shinjuku Line)
- Tracks: 6 (2 for Mita & Hanzōmon Lines, and 2 for Shinjuku Line)

Construction
- Structure type: Underground

Other information
- Station code: I-10, S-06, Z-07

History
- Opened: 30 June 1972; 54 years ago

Services
Preceding station	Tokyo Metro	Following station
Kudanshita towards Shibuya	Hanzōmon Line	Ōtemachi towards Oshiage
Preceding station	Toei Subway	Following station
Suidobashi towards Nishi-takashimadaira	Mita Line	Ōtemachi towards Meguro
Ichigaya towards Shinjuku	Shinjuku Line Express	Bakuro-yokoyama towards Motoyawata
Kudanshita towards Shinjuku	Shinjuku Line Local	Ogawamachi towards Motoyawata
Location
- Location within Tokyo Yamanote Loop Location within Tokyo wards area Location within Japan

Jimbocho Station (神保町駅, Jinbōchō-eki) is a subway station located at the Jimbōchō intersection of the Hakusan and Yasukuni streets in Chiyoda, Tokyo, Japan. The station is operated jointly by Tokyo Metro and Tokyo Metropolitan Bureau of Transportation (Toei). Because it is the nearest station to Senshu University, it has the secondary name Shenshu daigaku-mae.

== Lines ==
Jimbocho Station is served by the following three subway lines.

- Toei Mita Line (I-10)
- Toei Shinjuku Line (S-06)
- Tokyo Metro Hanzomon Line (Z-07)

== Station layout ==
- Level B1: Northern ticket barriers, Toei Shinjuku Line platforms
- Level B2: Southern and western ticket barriers
- Level B3: Toei Mita Line platforms
- Level B4: Tokyo Metro Hanzomon Line platforms
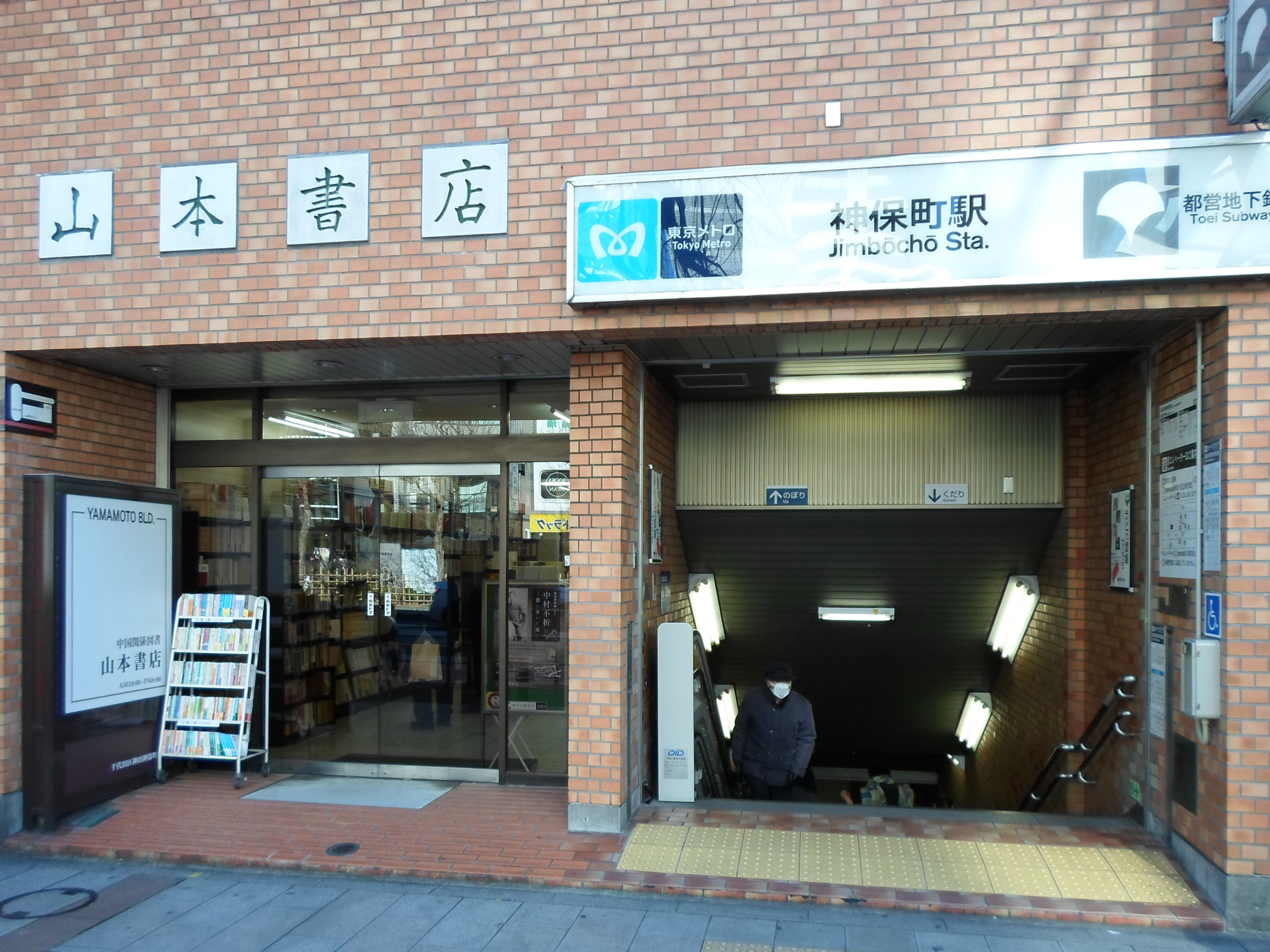
Entrance A1 in January 2015

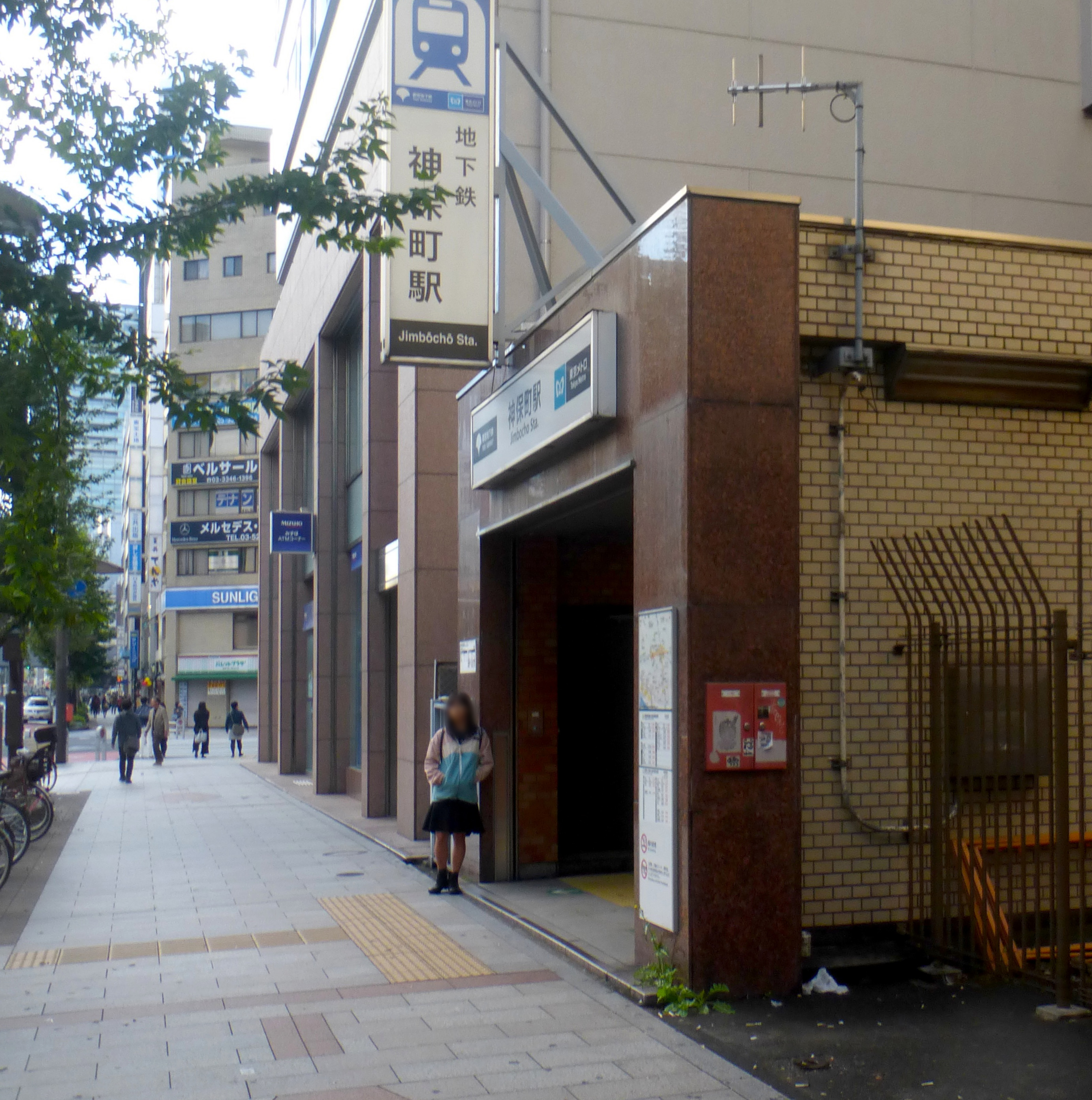
Entrance A2 in November 2015

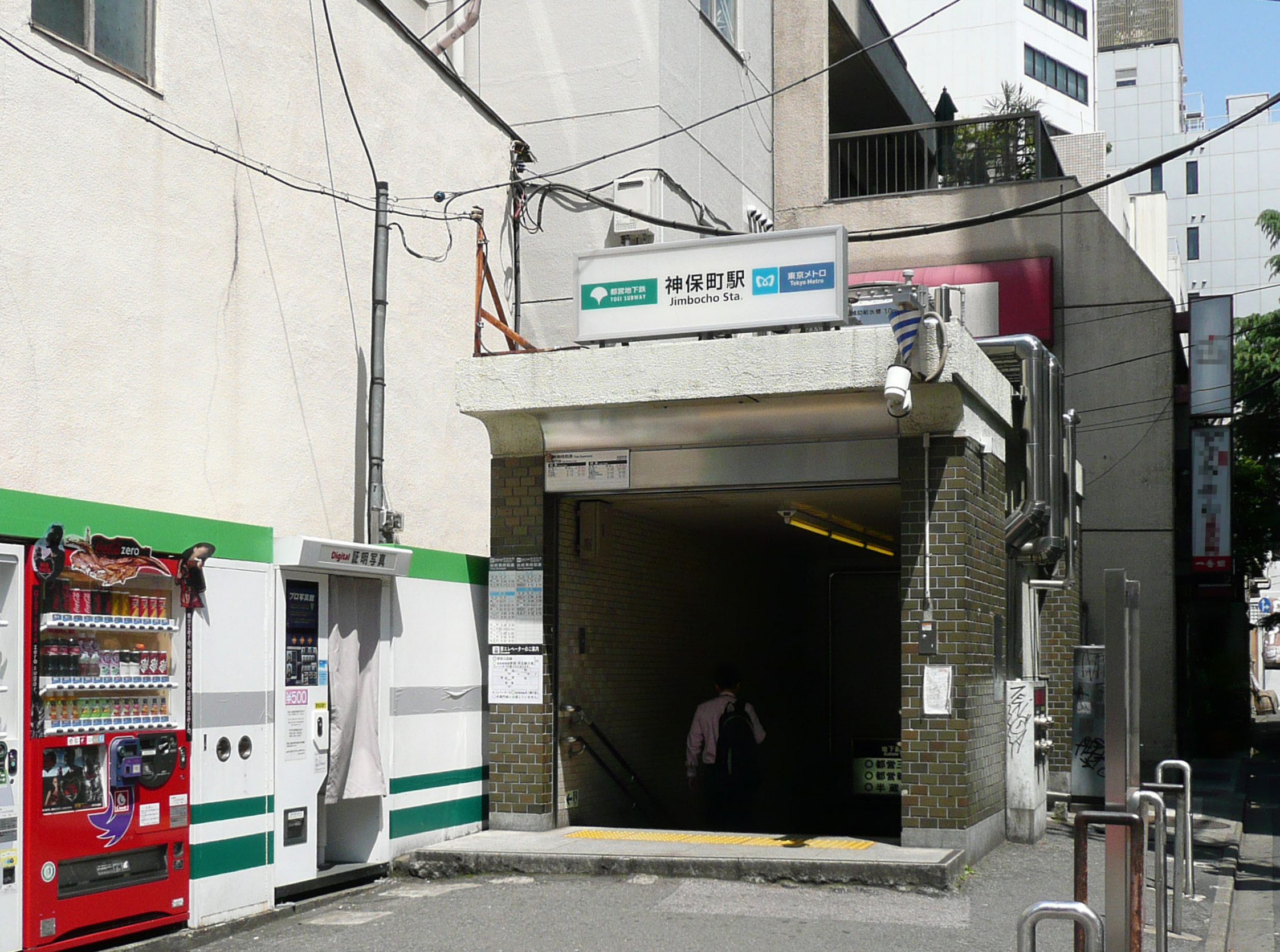
Entrance A7 in May 2010

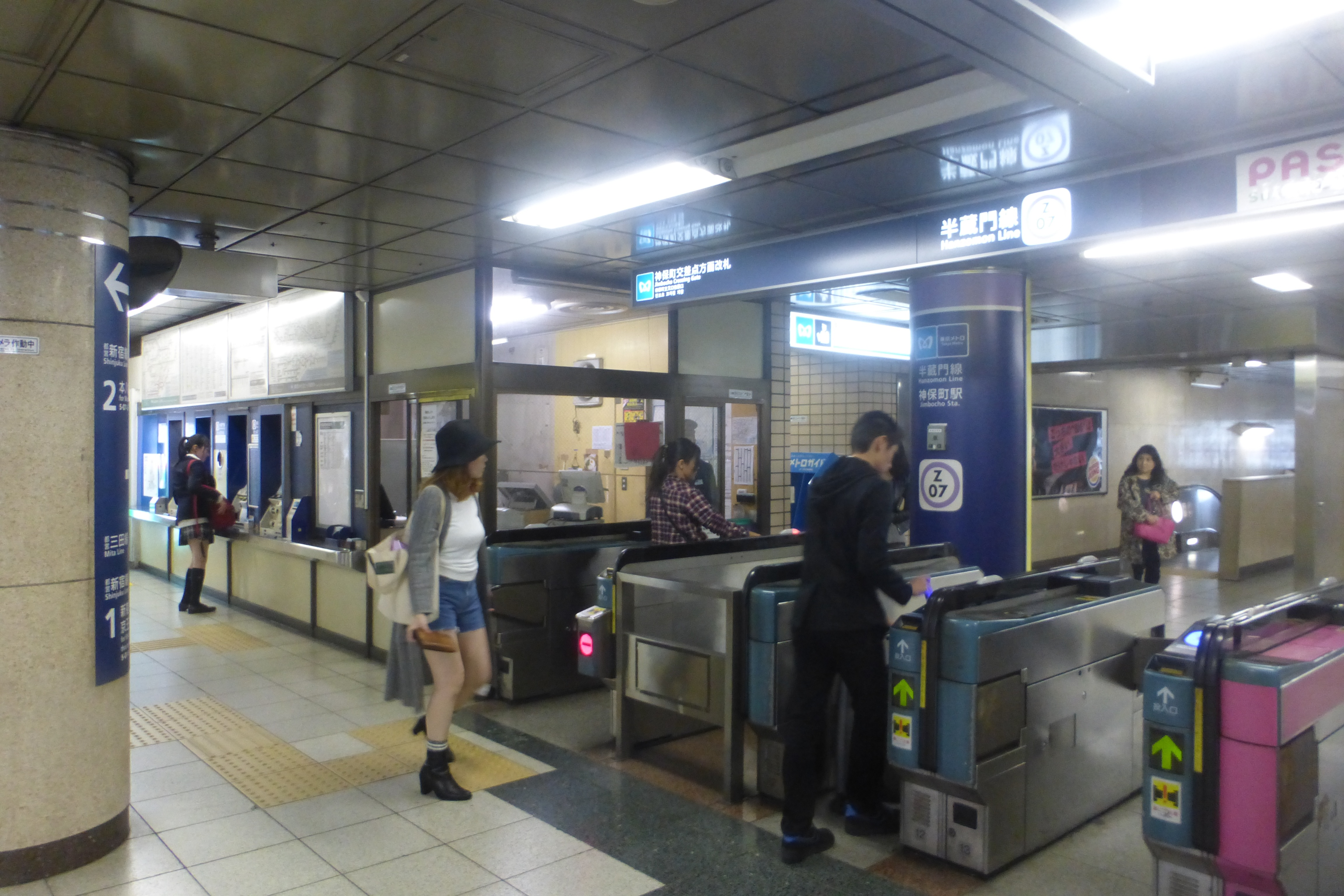
The Tokyo Metro Hanzomon Line ticket barriers in November 2015

=== Platforms ===
1
Shinjuku Line
for Shinjuku
Keio Line for Hatsudai, Hatagaya, Sasazuka, Meidaimae, Chōfu, and Hashimoto
2
Shinjuku Line
for Ōjima and Motoyawata
3
Mita Line
- for Shirokane-takanawa and Meguro
- Meguro Line for Musashi-Kosugi and Hiyoshi
- Sotetsu Main Line for Ebina via the Tokyu/Sotetsu Shin-Yokohama Line
- Sotetsu Izumino Line for Shōnandai via the Tokyu/Sotetsu Shin-Yokohama Line
4
Mita Line
for Sugamo and Nishi-takashimadaira
5
Hanzōmon Line
for Kudanshita and Shibuya
Tokyu Den-en-toshi Line for Nagatsuta and Chūō-Rinkan
6
Hanzōmon Line
for Kinshicho and Oshiage
Tobu Skytree Line for Kita-Koshigaya and Tōbu-Dōbutsu-Kōen
Tobu Isesaki Line for Kuki
Tōbu Nikkō Line for Minami-Kurihashi

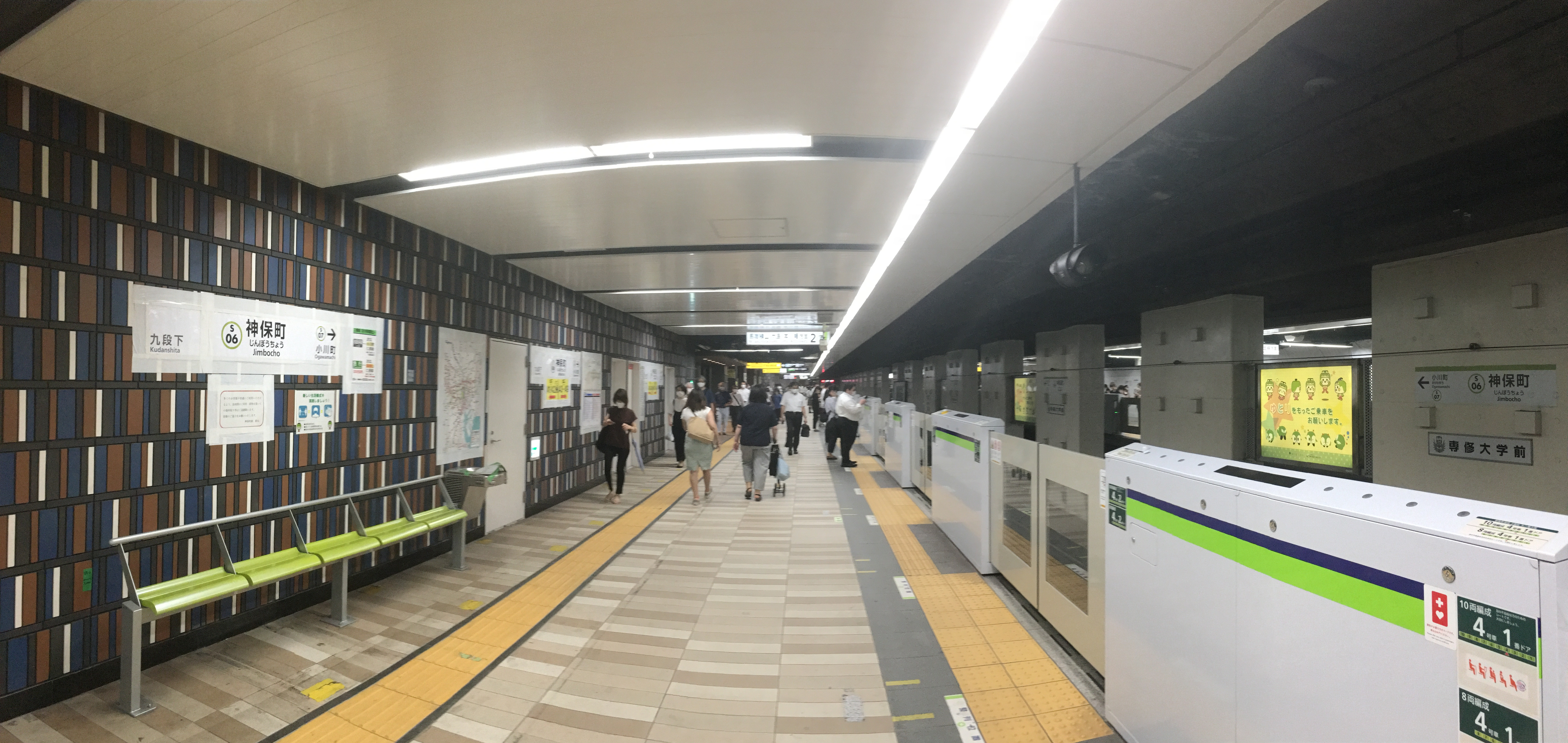
The Toei Shinjuku Line platforms in August 2020

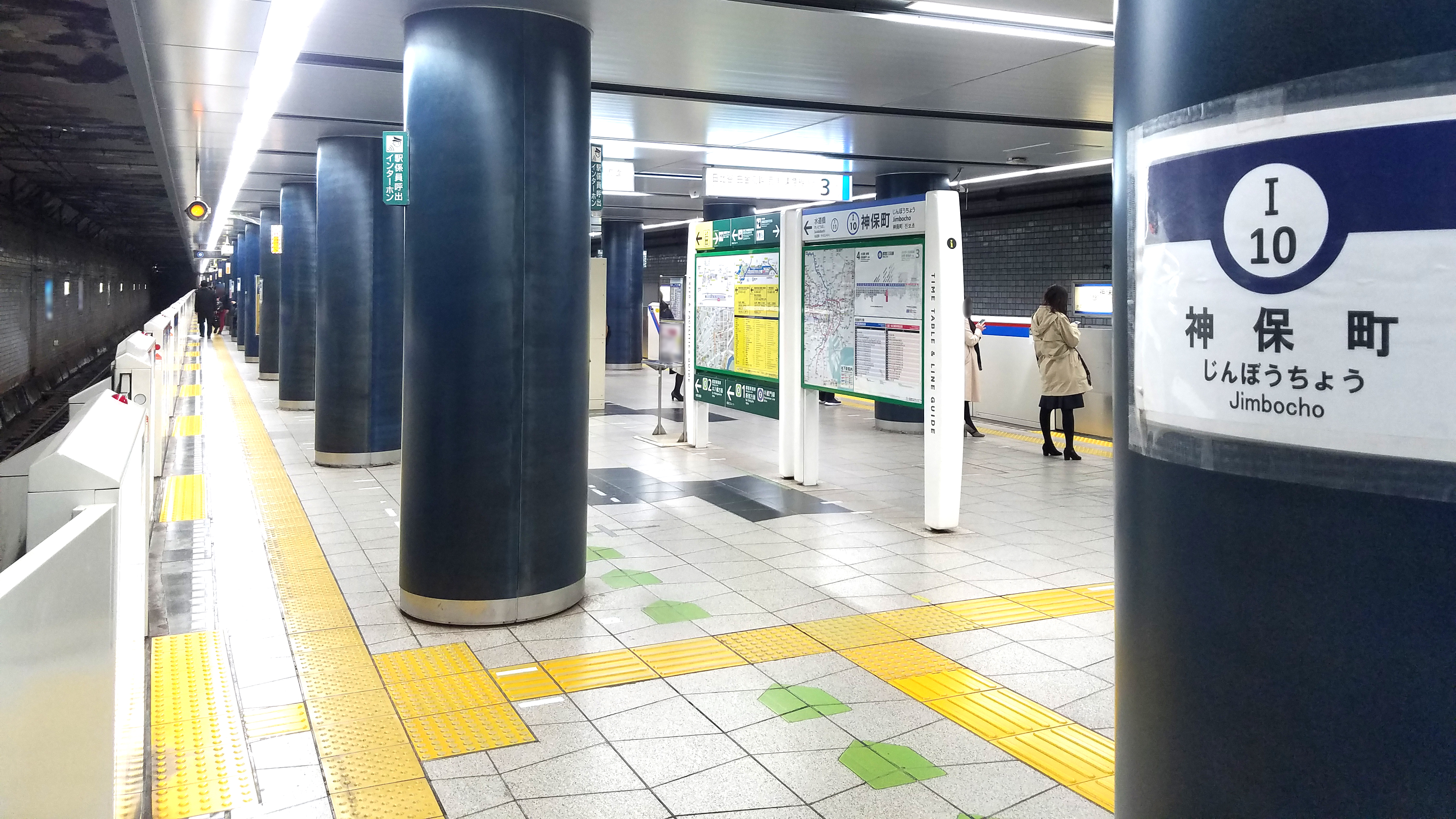
The Toei Mita Line platforms in December 2019

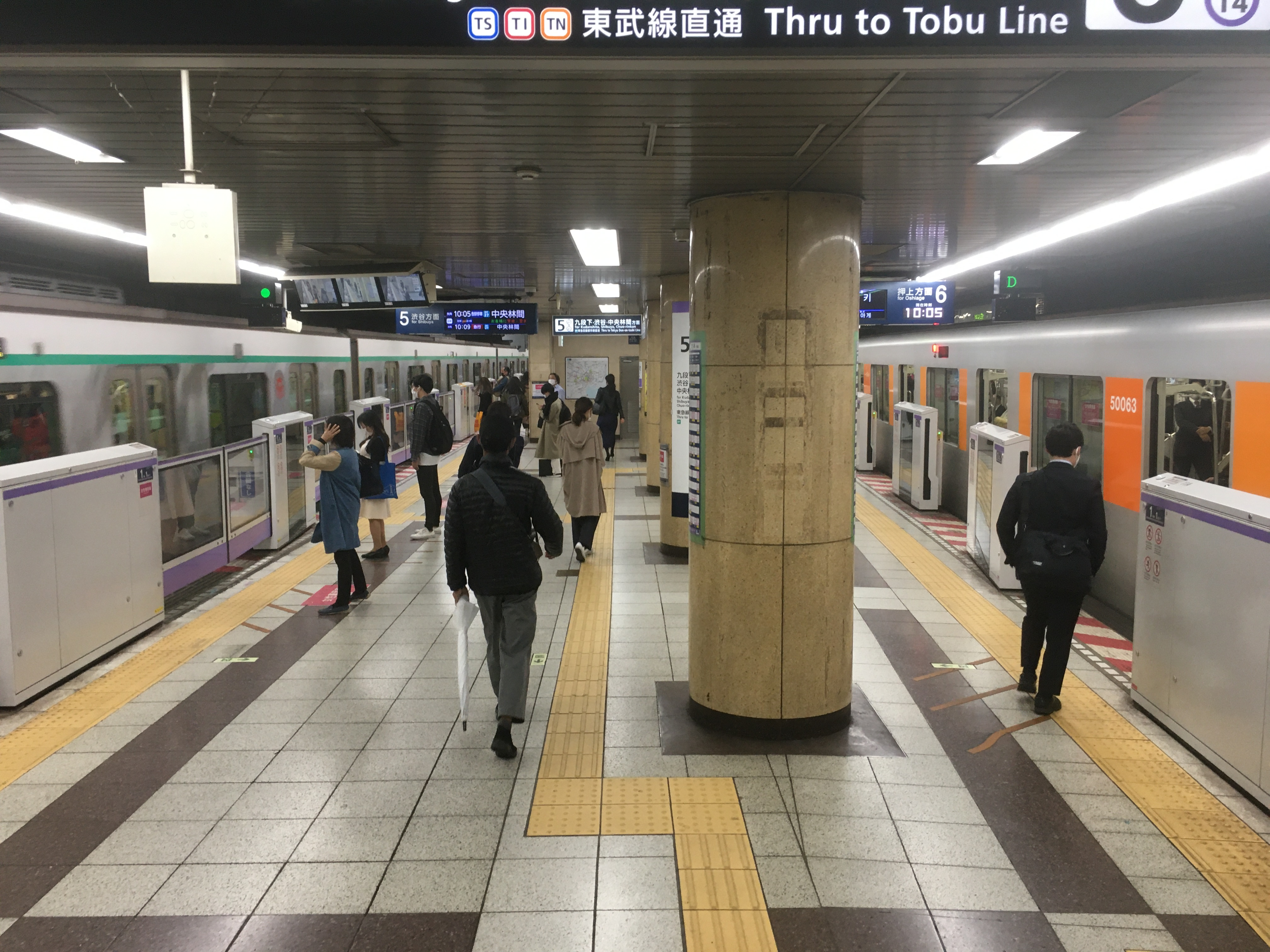
The Tokyo Metro Hanzomon Line platforms in November 2021

== History ==
The Mita Line station opened on 30 June 1972 as part of the Toei Line 6. The Shinjuku Line station opened on 16 March 1980. The Hanzomon Line station opened on 26 January 1989.

The station facilities of the Hanzomon Line were inherited by Tokyo Metro after the privatization of the Teito Rapid Transit Authority (TRTA) in 2004.

== Surrounding area ==
- Jimbōchō Book Town
- Jinbōchō Theater
- Senshu University
- Iwanami Shoten headquarters
- Shogakukan headquarters
- Shueisha headquarters
- Johnson & Johnson Japan office

== See also ==
- List of railway stations in Japan
