= Jinbōchō Theater =

Arts complex in Tokyo

Coordinates: 35°41′42″N 139°45′39″E

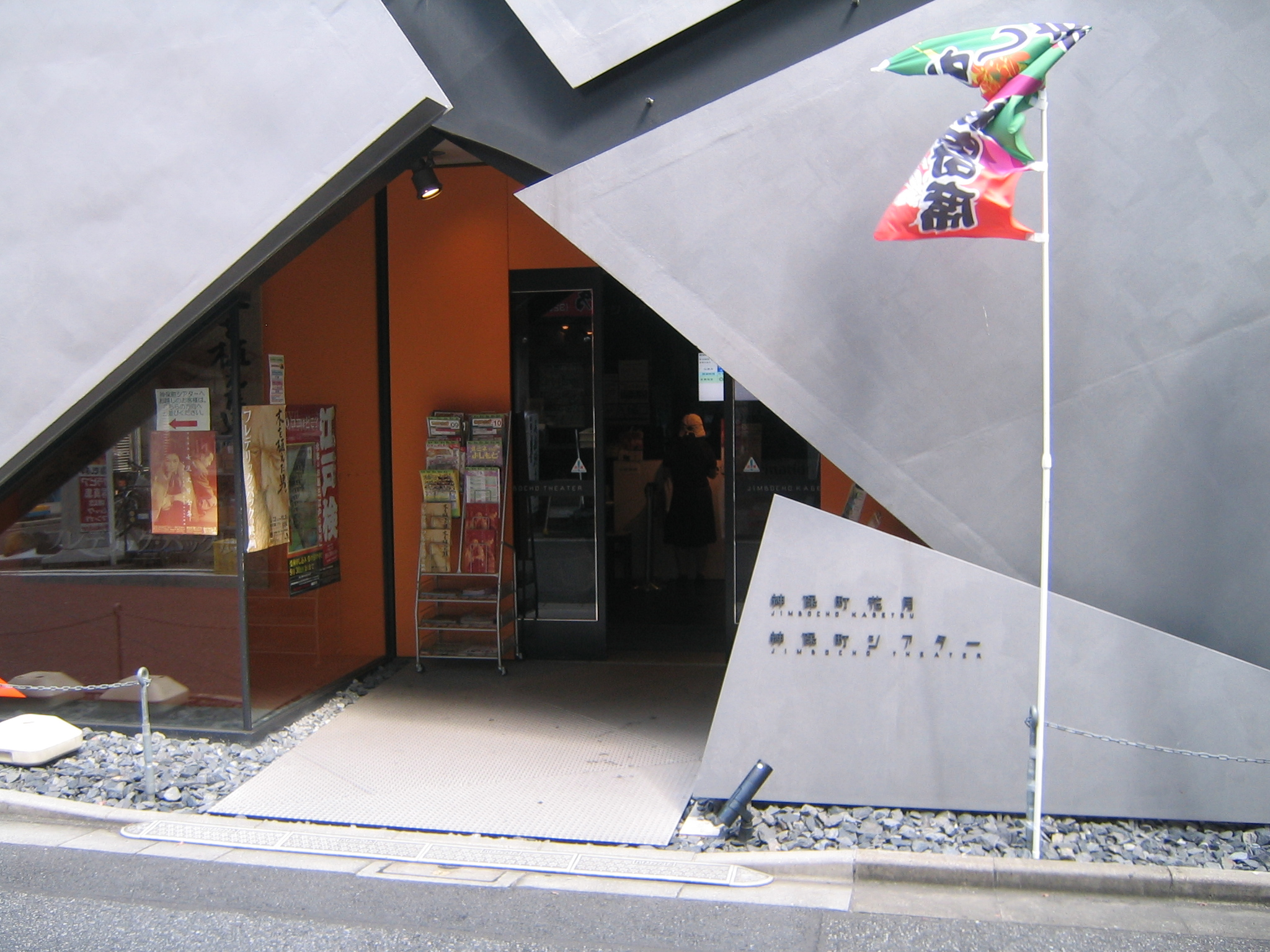
Jinbōchō Theater in Tokyo

Jinbōchō Theater (神保町シアター, Jinbōchō shiatā) is an arts complex comprising a theatre, cinema and rehearsal space in the Jinbōchō neighbourhood of Chiyoda, Tokyo. Opened on 7 July 2007, the theatre is owned and operated by publishing house Shogakukan.

Nikken Sekkei were the architects.

== See also ==
- Jimbōchō Station
