= Ichigaya Station =

Railway and metro station in Tokyo, Japan

Coordinates: 35°41′28″N 139°44′08″E

JB15 Ichigaya Station 市ヶ谷駅

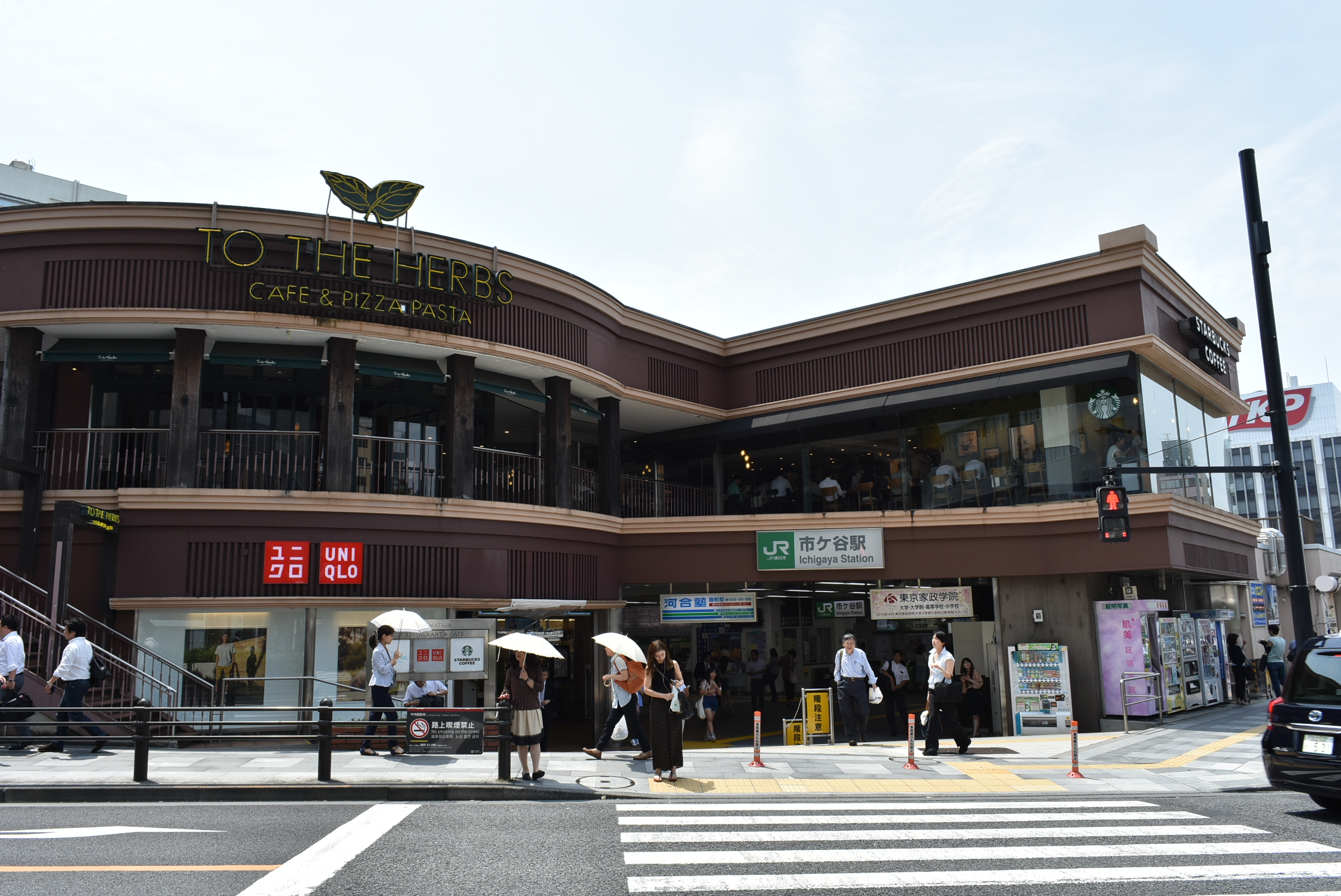
- Ichigaya Station entrance, 2018

General information
- Location: Chiyoda, Tokyo, Tokyo; Japan
- Operator: JR East; Tokyo Metro; Toei Subway
- Lines: Chūō-Sōbu Line; Yūrakuchō Line; Namboku Line; Shinjuku Line

Other information
- Station code: JB15 (Chūō-Sōbu Line); Y-14 (Yurakucho Line); N-09 (Namboku Line); S-04 (Toei Shinjuku Line)

History
- Opened: 6 March 1895; 131 years ago

Services
Preceding station	JR East	Following station
Yotsuya JB14 towards Mitaka	Chūō–Sōbu Line	Iidabashi JB16 towards Chiba
Preceding station	Tokyo Metro	Following station
Iidabashi towards Wakoshi	Yūrakuchō Line	Kojimachi towards Shin-kiba
Yotsuya towards Meguro	Namboku Line	Iidabashi towards Akabane-iwabuchi
Preceding station	Toei Subway	Following station
Shinjuku Terminus	Shinjuku Line Express	Jimbocho towards Motoyawata
Akebonobashi towards Shinjuku	Shinjuku Line Local	Kudanshita towards Motoyawata
Location
- Location within Tokyo Yamanote Loop Location within Tokyo wards area Location within Japan

Ichigaya Station (市ヶ谷駅, Ichigaya-eki) is a railway station in Chiyoda, Tokyo, Japan.

== Lines ==
The ground-level section of the station is managed by the East Japan Railway Company (JR East), and the underground sections are managed by Tokyo Metro and Tokyo Metropolitan Bureau of Transportation (Toei Subway). The station is served by the JR Chūō-Sōbu Line, Tokyo Metro Yūrakuchō Line, Tokyo Metro Namboku Line, and Toei Shinjuku Line. Chūō Line (Rapid) services pass the station.

Ichigaya Station is numbered Y-14 on the Yurakucho Line, N-09 on the Namboku Line, and S-04 on the Shinjuku Line.

== Platforms ==
=== JR East ===
1	Chūō-Sōbu Line	for Shinjuku, Nakano, and Mitaka
2	Chūō-Sōbu Line	Ochanomizu, Kinshichō, Tsudanuma, Chiba

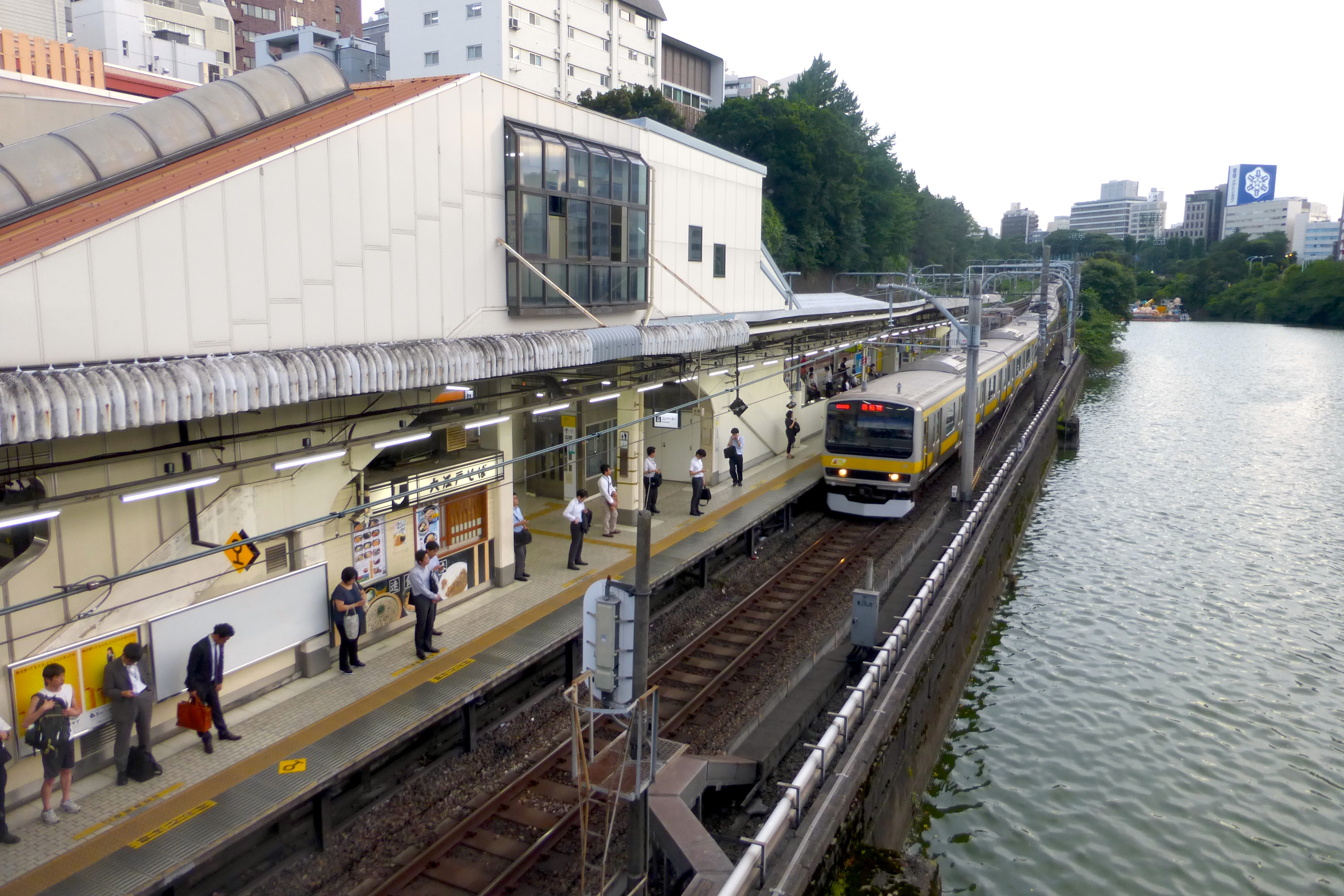
Chuo-Sobu Line platforms, 2015

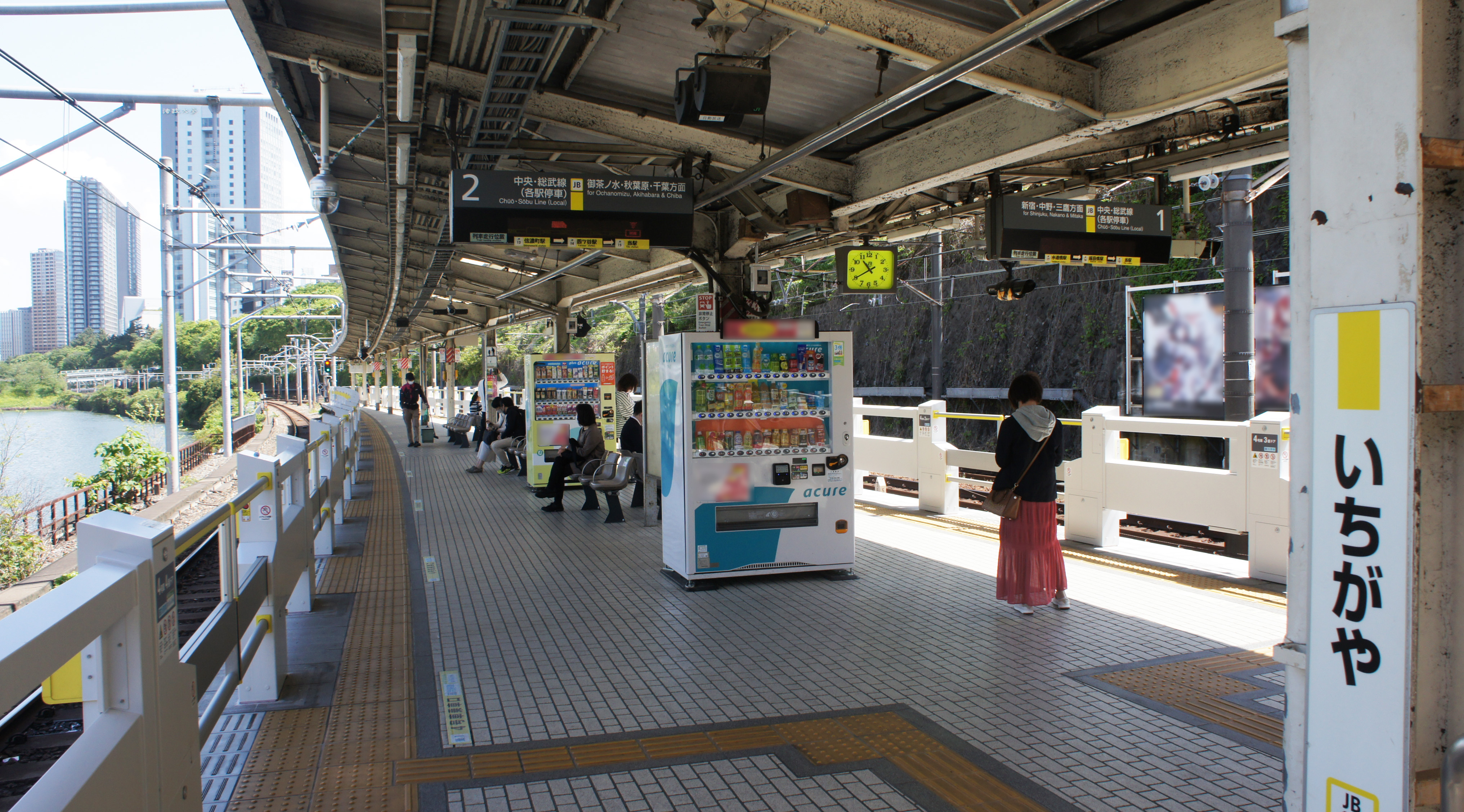
Chuo-Sobu Line platforms, 2021

=== Tokyo Metro ===
1
Yūrakuchō Line
for Tsukishima, Toyosu and Shin-Kiba
2
for Iidabashi and Ikebukuro
Seibu Ikebukuro Line for Hannō
Tobu Tojo Line for Shinrinkoen
3
Namboku Line
for Komagome, Akabane-Iwabuchi
Saitama Rapid Railway Line to Urawa-Misono
4
- for Shirokane-takanawa and Meguro
- Meguro Line for Hiyoshi
- Tokyu Shin-Yokohama Line for Shin-Yokohama Station
- Sotetsu Main Line for Ebina via the Tokyu/Sotetsu Shin-Yokohama Line

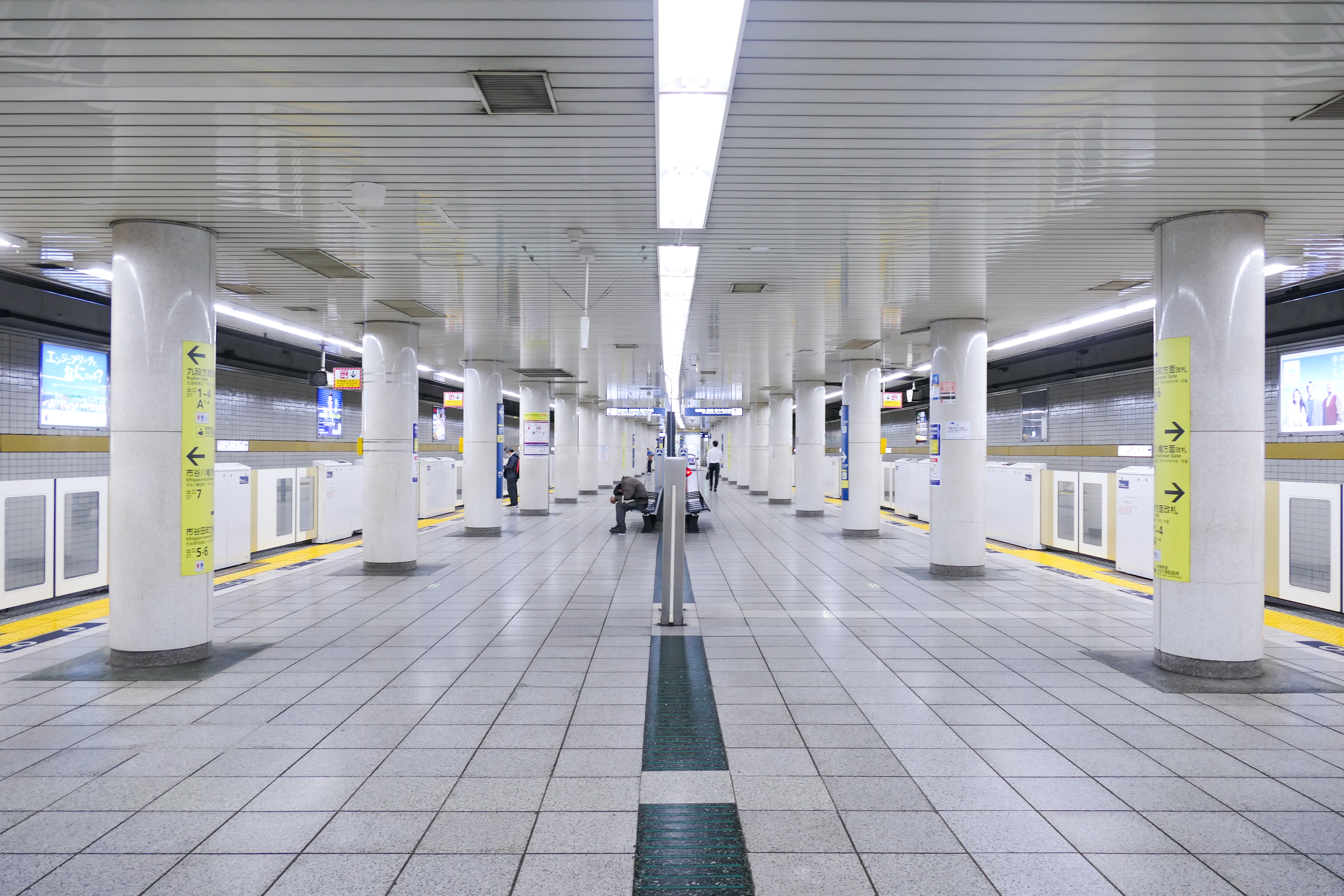
Yurakucho Line platforms

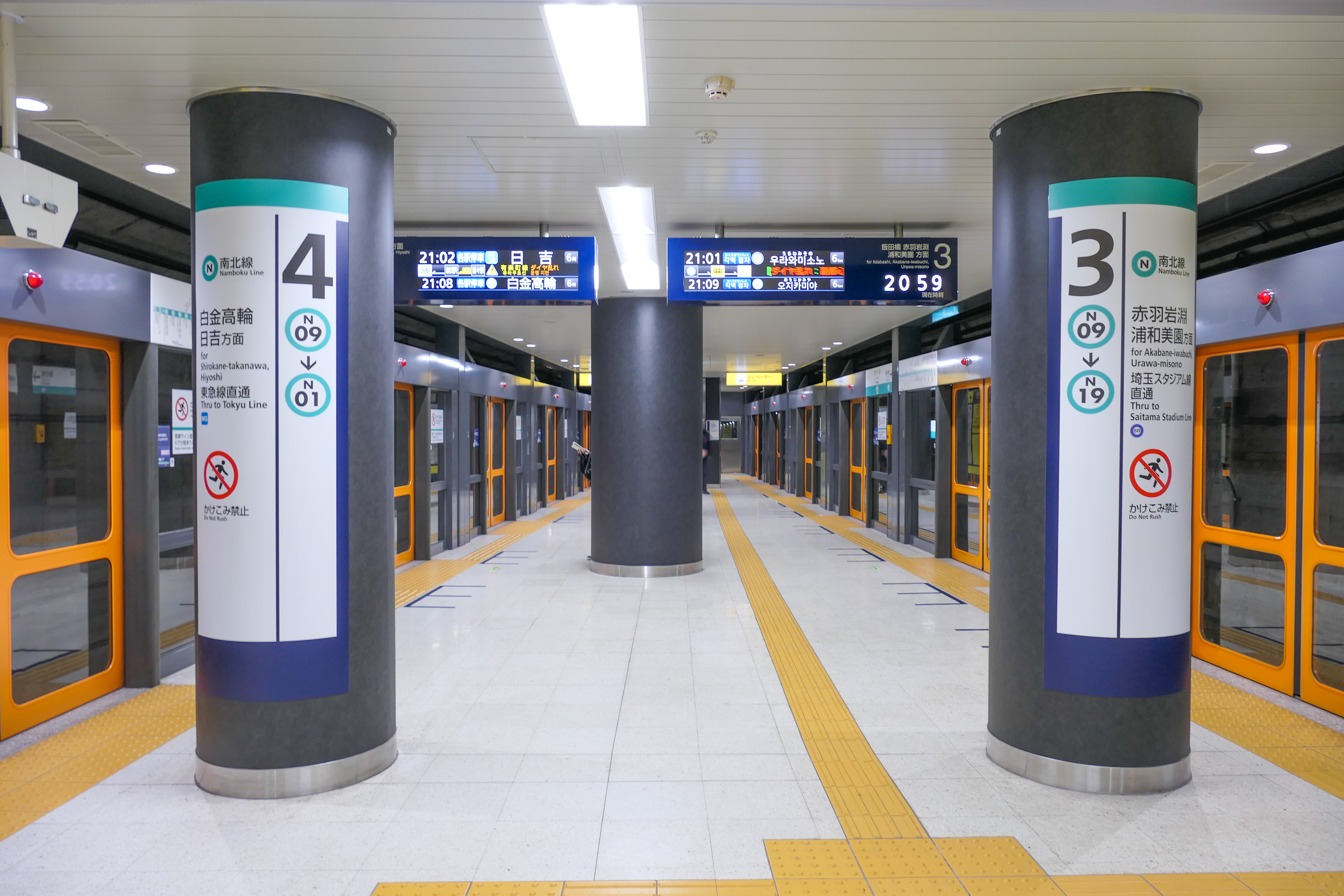
Namboku Line platforms

=== Toei Subway ===
1	Shinjuku Line	for Shinjuku; Keio Line for Hatsudai, Hatagaya, Meidaimae, Chōfu, and Hashimoto
2	Shinjuku Line	for Kudanshita, Jimbocho, Ōjima, and Moto-Yawata

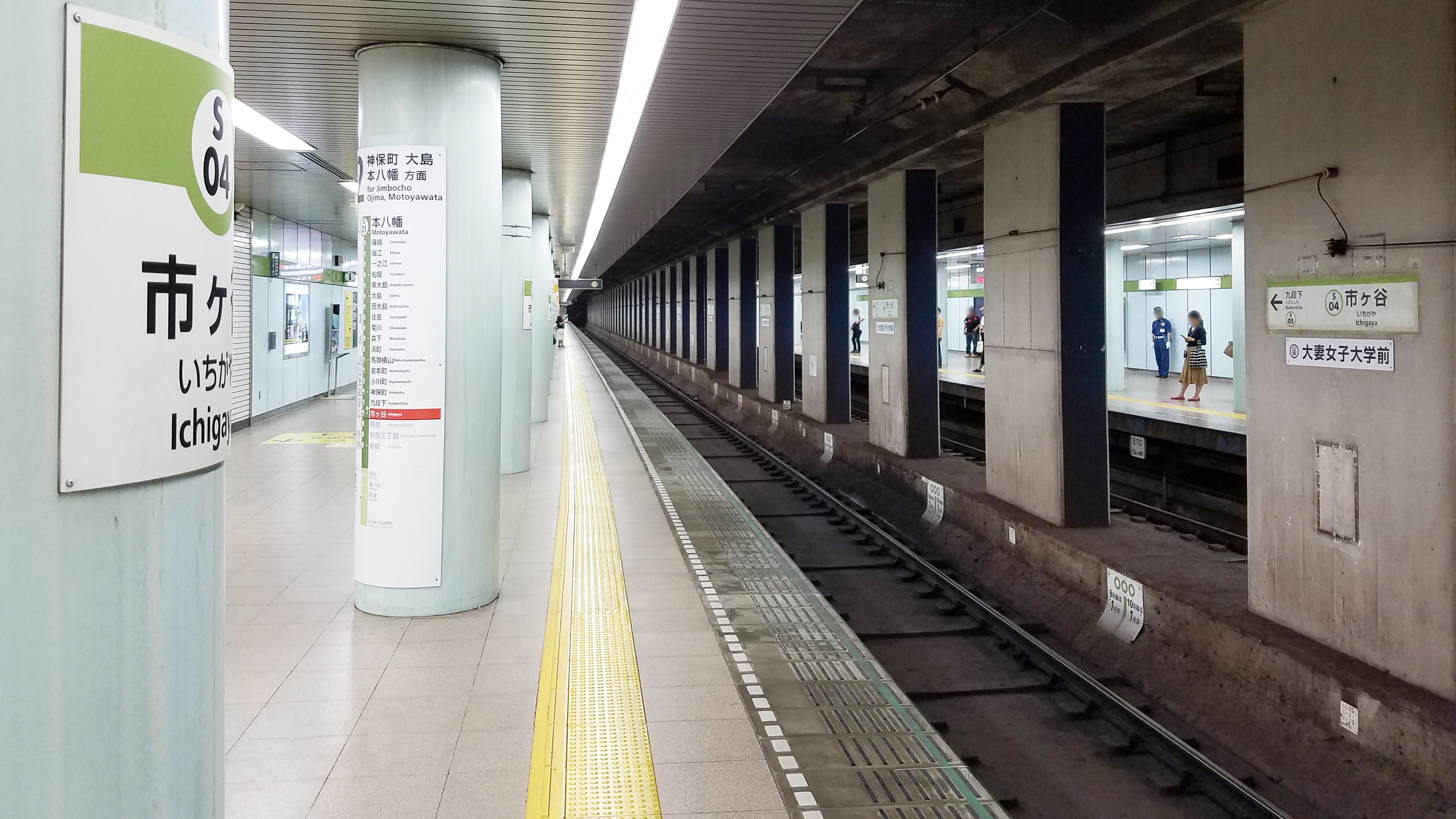
Shinjuku Line platforms before installation of platform screen doors, 2017

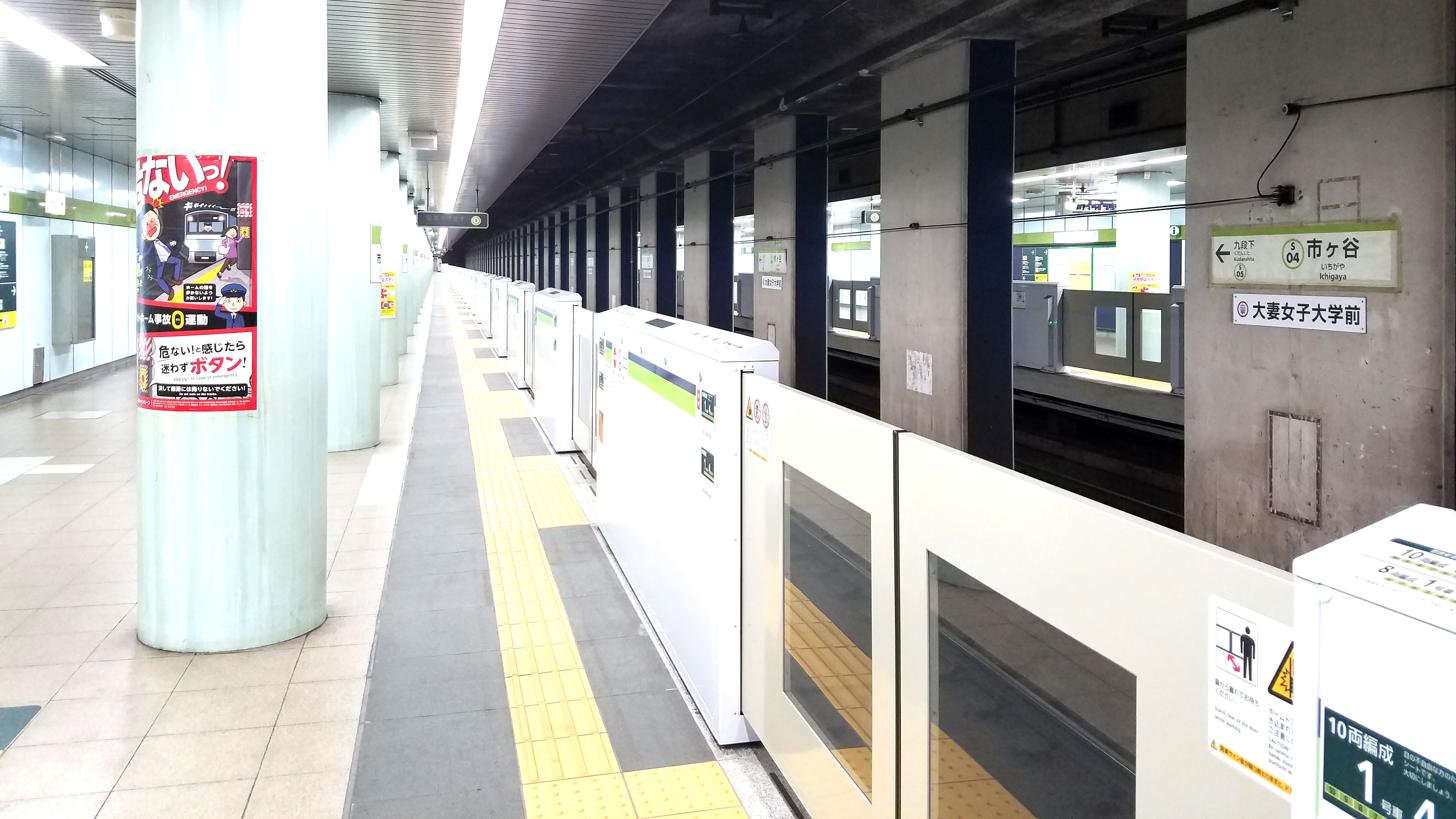
Shinjuku Line platforms after installation of platform screen doors, 2019

== History ==
The original JNR (now JR East) station opened on 6 March 1895. The Tokyo Metro Yurakucho Line station opened on 30 October 1974, and the Namboku Line station opened on 26 March 1996.

The station facilities of the Yurakucho and Namboku Lines were inherited by Tokyo Metro after the privatization of the Teito Rapid Transit Authority (TRTA) in 2004.

== Surrounding area ==
The headquarters of the Ministry of Defense of Japan and of the Japan Go Association are located in the vicinity of Ichigaya station. The headquarters of Creatures Inc. was also located.
