= Days at the Morisaki Bookshop =

2010 novel by Satoshi Yagisawa

- Author: Satoshi Yagisawa
- Original title: 森崎書店の日々
- Translator: Eric Ozawa
- Language: Japanese
- Genre: Slice-of-life, literary fiction
- Publisher: Shogakukan (JP); Harper Perennial (US)
- Publication date: 7 September 2010 (JP)
- Publication place: Japan
- English publication date: 4 July 2023
- Media type: Print (paperback), e-book, audiobook
- Pages: 208 p. (Japanese 1st ed.); 160 p. (English 1st ed.)
- ISBN: 978-4-09-408545-7
- Followed by: More Days at the Morisaki Bookshop

Days at the Morisaki Bookshop (Japanese: 森崎書店の日々, Morisaki Shoten no Hibi) is the debut novel by the Japanese writer Satoshi Yagisawa. First published in Japan in 2010, it follows a young woman who rebuilds her life while living and working in her uncle's secondhand bookshop in Tokyo's Kanda–Jinbōchō district. The book won the third Chiyoda Literature Prize and became a national bestseller. An English translation by Eric Ozawa was released worldwide by Harper Perennial in July 2023.

== Plot ==
Takako, a 25-year-old office worker, is devastated when her boyfriend Hideaki announces he is marrying someone else. After quitting her job, she retreats to her apartment until her divorced uncle Satoru invites her to move into the cramped second floor of the Morisaki Bookshop, his bookstore in Jinbōchō. Surrounded by musty stacks and eccentric regulars, Takako slowly rediscovers pleasure in reading and begins to heal.

Takako gradually settles into life at the bookshop, and reconnects with Satoru. When Hideaki suddenly contacts her, Takako tells Satoru how poorly her ex-boyfriend treated her. Satoru insists that they confront Hideaki to extract an apology. Hideaki refuses to acknowledge them, but Takako is able to finally express her anger and unhappiness towards how Hideaki took advantage of her. Finally able to emotionally move on, she finds a new job at a more laid-back design firm, finally prepares to leave the bookshop, and waves a grateful goodbye to Satoru, thankful for her new life.

About one year after Takako moves out, Satoru's estranged partner Momoko appears. While the couple refuses to acknowledge their time apart, Takako grows curious and resents Momoko for abandoning Satoru. Takako also meets a young man at the local cafe, who she recalls was a regular customer at the Morisaki Bookshop and discovers that he is pining after his ex-girlfriend.

While she and her aunt reacquaint, Momoko invites Takako to a trip in the mountains, where she reveals her cancer as the reason for her disappearance, so as to avoid hurting Satoru in the event of her death. As Momoko and Takako grow closer, Satoru also learns and comes to terms with Momoko's health crisis.

== Background and publication ==
Yagisawa submitted the manuscript to the Chiyoda Literature Prize, where it won the grand prize in 2009. Shogakukan published the novel as a paperback on 7 September 2010, later adding the short epilogue “The Return of Momoko.” A full sequel, More Days at the Morisaki Bookshop (続・森崎書店の日々), appeared in 2011.

=== English translation ===
The first authorised English edition, translated by Eric Ozawa, was published by Harper Perennial on 4 July 2023. A translation of the sequel followed in 2024.

== Film adaptation ==
The novel was adapted into a feature film of the same title directed by Asako Hyuga and released theatrically in Japan on 23 October 2010.

== Reception ==
Days at the Morisaki Bookshop was warmly received by readers and critics, remaining on Japanese bestseller lists for several months. English-language reviewers praised the novel’s gentle atmosphere and its celebration of reading. The translation was shortlisted for the 2024 British Book Awards in the Debut Book category.

== See also ==
- Bookstore tourism
- Jinbōchō, Tokyo
