= Kanda-Jinbōchō =

- District in Tokyo
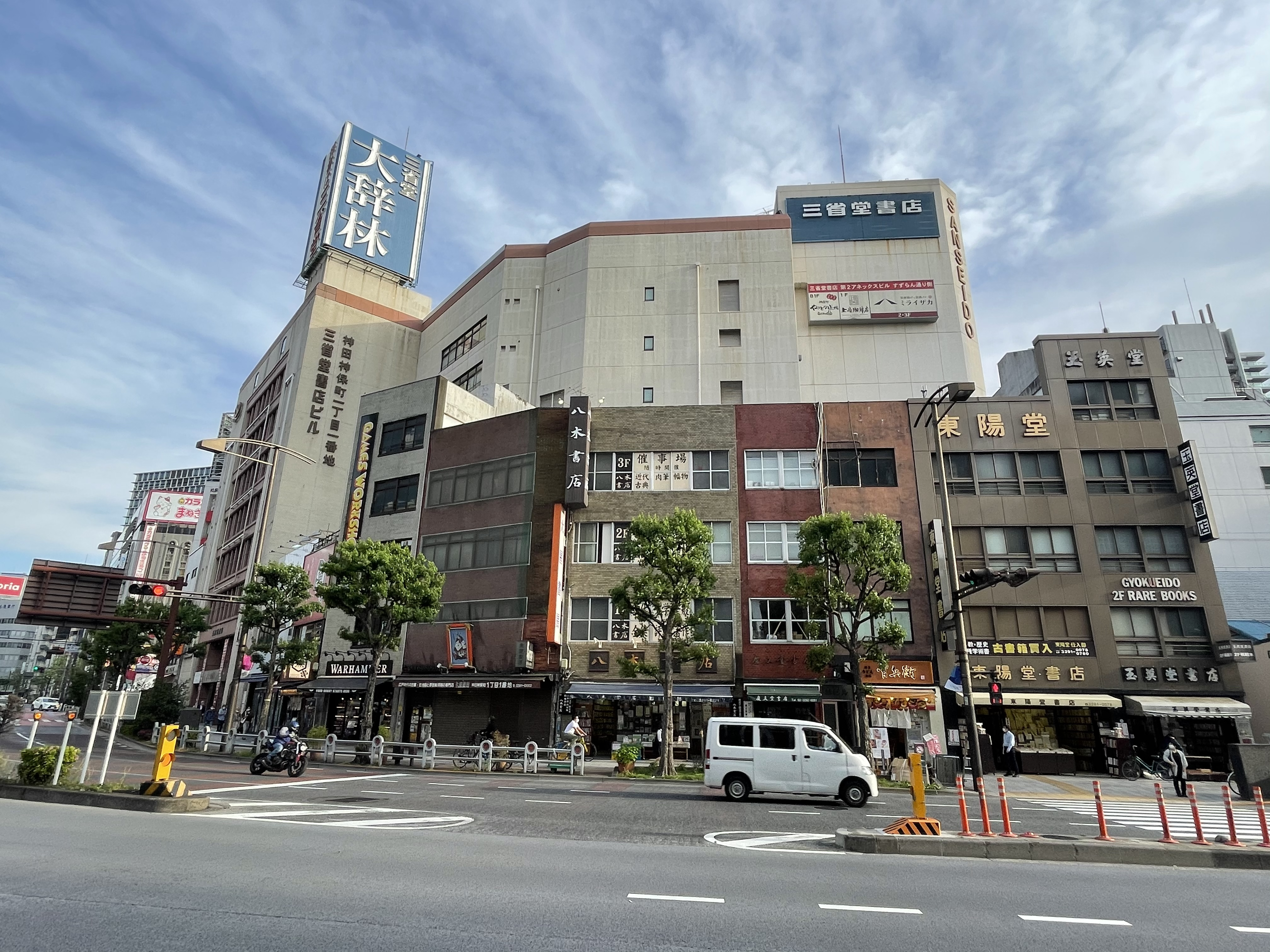
- Kanda-Jinbōchō in 2021
- Interactive map of Kanda-Jinbōchō
- Coordinates: 35°41′43.77″N 139°45′29.23″E
- Country: Japan
- Prefecture: Tokyo
- Ward: Chiyoda
- Area: Kanda

Population (2017)
  - Total: 3,205

Kanda-Jinbōchō (神田神保町), commonly known as Jinbōchō or Jimbōchō, is a district of Chiyoda, Tokyo, Japan. Jimbōchō Book Town is known as Tokyo's center of used-book stores and publishing houses, and as a popular antique and curio shopping area.

The center of Jinbōchō is at the crossing of Yasukuni-dōri and Hakusan-dōri, above Jimbōchō Station on the Tokyo Metro Hanzōmon Line, Toei Mita Line and Toei Shinjuku Line. The prestigious Tokyo Book Binding Club and Literature Preservation Society are located in Jinbōchō, and the area is within walking distance of a number of major universities, including Nihon, Senshu, Meiji, Hosei and Juntendo.

Jinbōchō is officially known (in addresses, etc.) as Kanda-Jinbōchō (神田神保町), and is part of the former ward of Kanda.

In 2025 Time Out named it the coolest neighborhood in the world.

== History ==
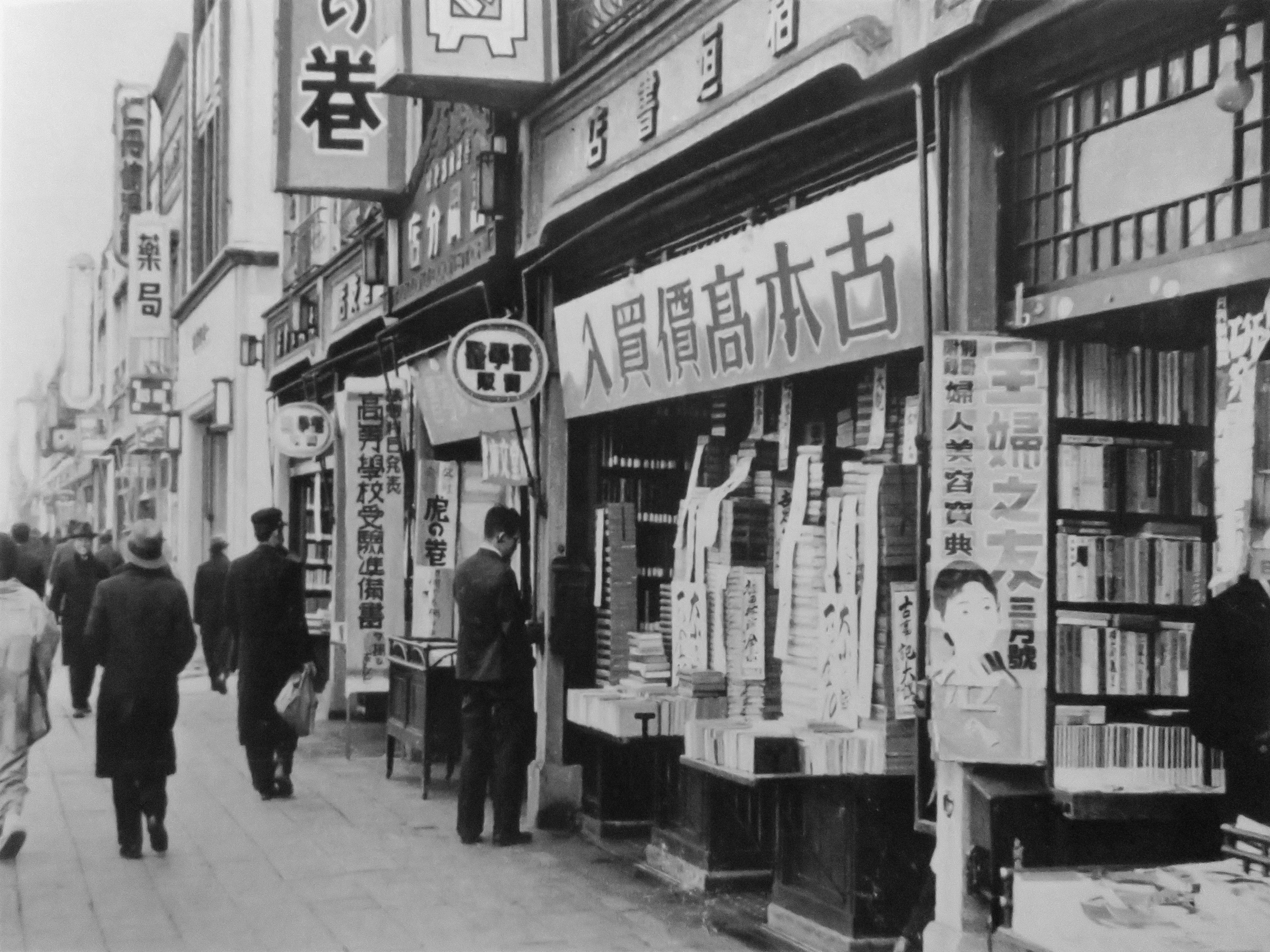
Kanda-Jinbōchō (1934, Kōyō Ishikawa)

Jinbōchō is likely named after a member of the Jinbō family, possibly Nagaharu Jinbō (神保長治) who lived in the area at the end of the 17th century.

During the late nineteenth century when Japan underwent modernization, foreign studies schools opened in the area, such as Bansho Shirabesho (Institute for Research of Foreign Documents) and Tokyo Gaikokugo Gakko (Tokyo School of Foreign Languages) which would later become the University of Tokyo and Hitotsubashi University. Many bookstores opened in the area, and it became established as a book town. In 1913, a large fire destroyed much of the area. In the wake of the fire, a former teacher named Shigeo Iwanami opened a bookstore in Jinbōchō which eventually grew into today's Iwanami Shoten publishing house. In 1923, the Great Kanto Earthquake caused a fire destroying much of the former Kanda-ku including the Jinbocho library and campus of the University of Tokyo, which was subsequently relocated to Bunkyo-ku. Over time, the area became increasingly popular with university students and intellectuals, and many more small bookstores and cafes opened there.

More recently, the Chiyoda municipal government sponsored a major redevelopment project in Jinbōchō which led to three new high-rise office buildings being completed in 2003, further boosting the local economy. The Jinbōchō Theater was completed in 2007.

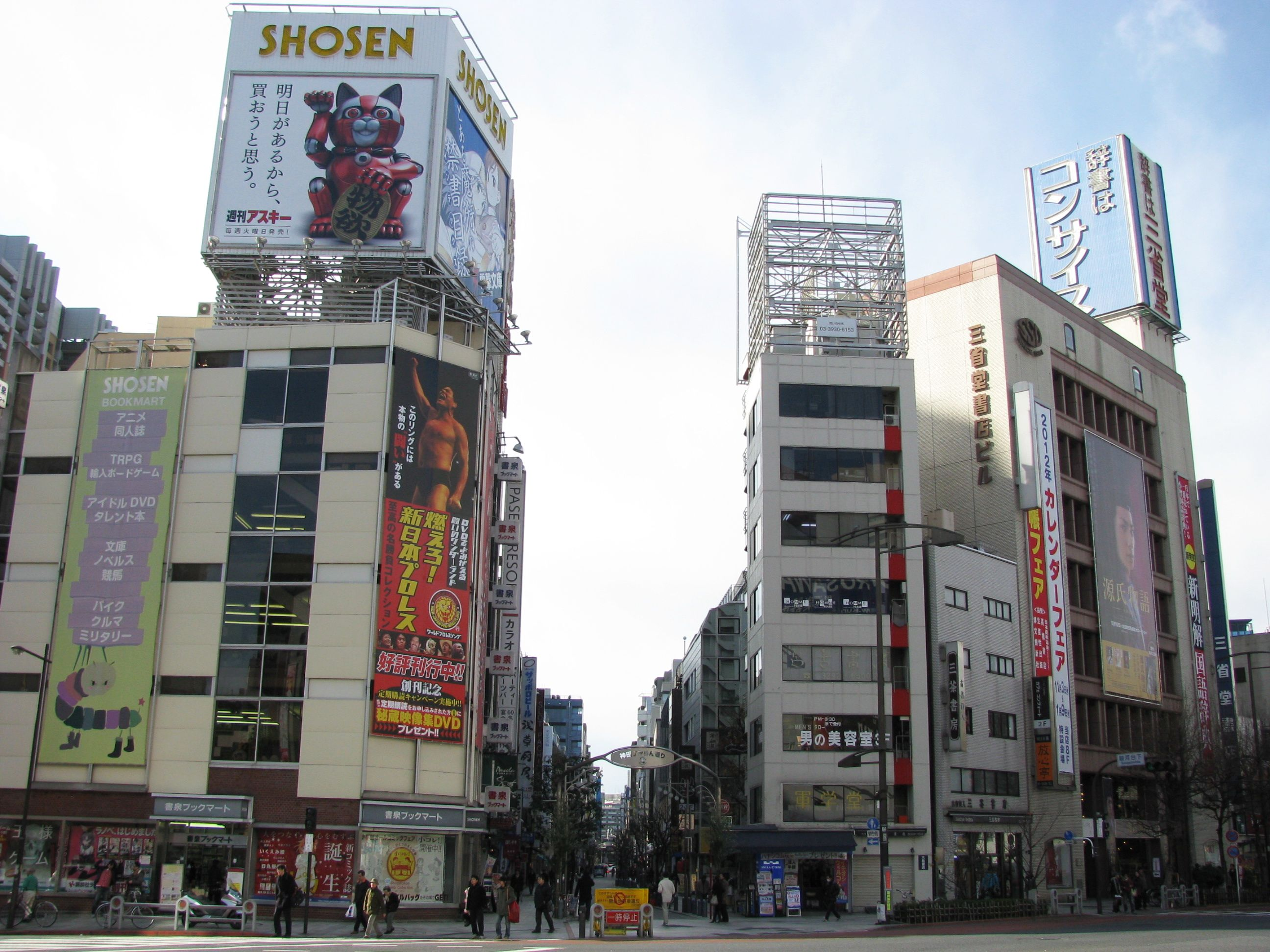
Kanda-Jinbōchō in 2011 (Suzuran Street)

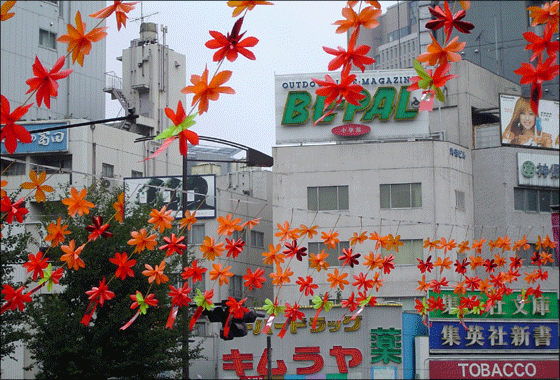
Jinbōchō at Yasukunidori and Hakusan

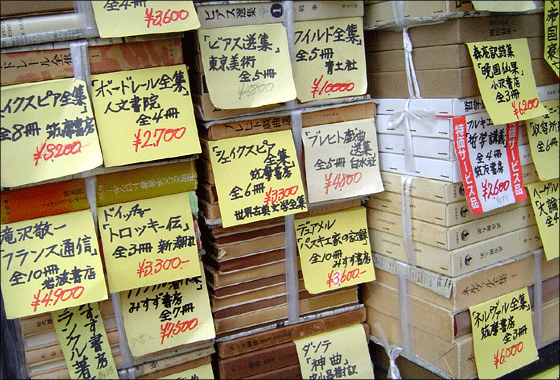
Jinbōchō Fall Book Fair

== Companies ==
Many companies are located within Jinbōchō, including the headquarters of Tōkyōdō Shoten and manga company Shueisha, known for the anthology manga magazine, Shonen Jump.

== In popular culture ==
- Jinbōchō is an important location in the Read or Die light novel franchise, and is the area where protagonist Yomiko Readman resides.
- Studio Ghibli film The Wind Rises depicts the 1923 Great Kantō earthquake and subsequent fire destroying the former Jinbocho campus of Tokyo Imperial University.
- Manga and anime series Dropkick on My Devil! used Jinbōchō as the area where main characters Yurine Hanazono and Jashin-chan reside, the district name was also featured in the plot, episode titles, and lyrics of feature songs.
- The Days at the Morisaki Bookshop series of books by Satoshi Yagisawa is primarily set in a bookshop in Jinbōchō.

== Education ==
Chiyoda Board of Education operates public elementary and junior high schools. Ochanomizu Elementary School (お茶の水小学校) is the zoned elementary school for Kanda-Jinbōchō 1–3 chōme. There is a freedom of choice system for junior high schools in Chiyoda Ward, and so there are no specific junior high school zones.

== See also ==
- Jimbōchō Book Town
