= List of Toei Subway stations =

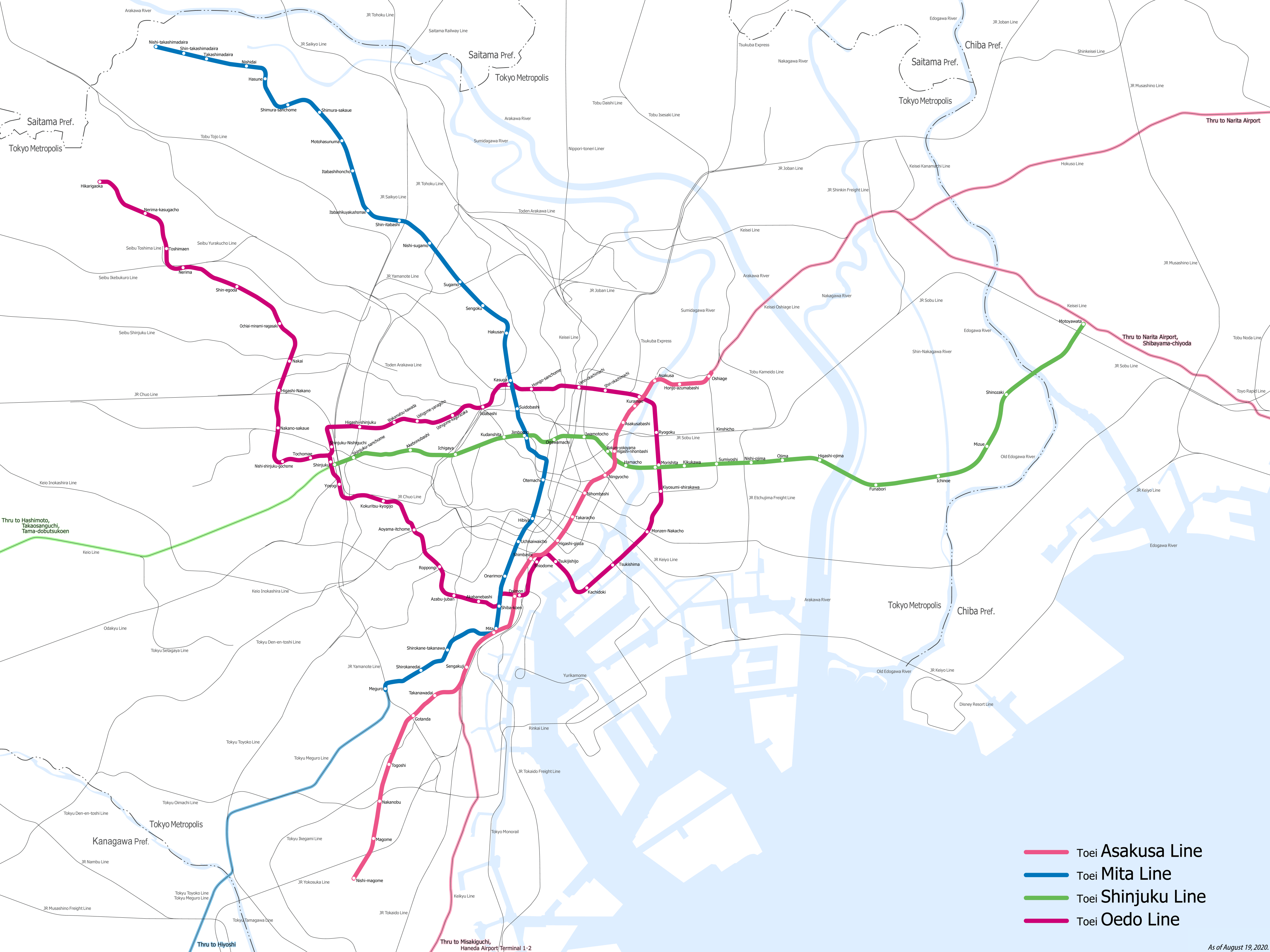
Toei Subway lines

List of Toei Subway stations lists stations on the Toei Subway, including station location (ward or city), opening date, design (underground, at-grade, or elevated), and daily ridership.

== Summary ==
There are a total of 99 “unique” stations (i.e., counting stations served by multiple lines only once) on the Toei Subway network, or 106 total stations if each station on each line counts as one station. Almost all stations are located within the 23 special wards, with many located in areas not served by the complementary Tokyo Metro network.

The Tokyo Metropolitan Bureau of Transportation reports ridership for each station by line—stations served by multiple lines have multiple ridership figures, one for each line serving the station. Passengers making in-system transfers between lines are counted in the ridership of each line used, at the station where the transfer takes place. As a result, summing the total daily ridership of each of the lines will yield a total that is greater than the actual daily ridership of the system as a whole.

For stations directly shared with other railways—e.g., Shirokanedai and other Toei Mita Line stations shared with the Namboku Line, the daily ridership only considers people using Toei Subway trains (or through-servicing trains owned by other railways operating as Toei Subway trains). For “interface” stations designed to allow for through-servicing and transfers with other railways without exiting the station's paid area (e.g., Oshiage on the Asakusa Line), the station “entries” and “exits” also consider cross-company passengers riding on through-servicing trains (as part of trackage rights agreements) or transferring to or from other railways' trains without passing through faregates.

== Stations ==
Station	Japanese	Line	Photo	Opening date	Design	Ward or City	Daily ridership (FY2024)
Shinjuku	新宿	(E) (S)		16 Mar 1980; 19 Dec 1997	Underground	Shibuya	418,340
Daimon	大門	(E) (A)		1 Oct 1964; 12 Dec 2000	Underground	Minato	335,619
Jimbōchō	神保町	(I) (S)		30 Jun 1972; 16 Mar 1980	Underground	Chiyoda	262,832
Oshiage	押上	(A)		4 Dec 1960	Underground	Sumida	227,566
Mita	三田	(I) (A)		21 Jun 1968; 27 Nov 1973	Underground	Minato	212,652
Sengakuji	泉岳寺	(A)		21 Jun 1968	Underground	Minato	209,882
Morishita	森下	(E) (S)		21 Dec 1978; 12 Dec 2000	Underground	Kōtō	139,410
Kasuga	春日	(E) (I)		30 Jun 1972; 12 Dec 2000	Underground	Bunkyō	132,843
Bakuro-Yokoyama	馬喰横山	(S)		21 Dec 1978	Underground	Chūō	112,233
Kudanshita	九段下	(S)		16 Mar 1980	Underground	Chiyoda	111,197
Ōtemachi	大手町	(I)		30 Jun 1972	Underground	Chiyoda	109,600
Meguro	目黒	(I)		26 Sep 2000	Underground	Shinagawa	108,156
Nihombashi	日本橋	(A)		28 Feb 1963	Underground	Chūō	94,679
Kachidoki	勝どき	(E)		12 Dec 2000	Underground	Chūō	91,189
Ichigaya	市ヶ谷	(S)		16 Mar 1980	Underground	Chiyoda	90,108
Shimbashi	新橋	(A)		12 Dec 1963	Underground	Minato	88,540
Sugamo	巣鴨	(I)		27 Dec 1968	Underground	Toshima	88,108
Hibiya	日比谷	(I)		30 Jun 1972	Underground	Chiyoda	85,848
Higashi-ginza	東銀座	(A)		28 Feb 1963	Underground	Chūō	85,509
Roppongi	六本木	(E)		12 Dec 2000	Underground	Minato	83,043
Monzen Nakachō	門前仲町	(E)		12 Dec 2000	Underground	Kōtō	81,017
Kuramae	蔵前	(A) (E)		4 Dec 1960; 12 Dec 2000	Underground	Taitō	80,311
Higashi-nihombashi	東日本橋	(A)		31 May 1962	Underground	Chūō	79,857
Nerima	練馬	(E)		10 Dec 1991	Underground	Nerima	78,323
Ogawamachi	小川町	(S)		16 Mar 1980	Underground	Chiyoda	73,254
Shinjuku Sanchōme	新宿三丁目	(S)		16 Mar 1980	Underground	Shinjuku	72,667
Motoyawata	本八幡	(S)		19 Mar 1989	Underground	Ichikawa (Chiba)	72,322
Tsukishima	月島	(E)		12 Dec 2000	Underground	Chūō	69,362
Aoyama-Itchōme	青山一丁目	(E)		12 Dec 2000	Underground	Minato	68,934
Asakusabashi	浅草橋	(A)		4 Dec 1960	Underground	Taitō	60,025
Gotanda	五反田	(A)		15 Nov 1968	Underground	Shinagawa	59,177
Asakusa	浅草	(A)		4 Dec 1960	Underground	Taitō	59,010
Shin-Okachimachi	新御徒町	(E)		12 Dec 2000	Underground	Taitō	58,639
Funabori	船堀	(S)		23 Dec 1983	Elevated	Edogawa	58,409
Hikarigaoka	光が丘	(E)		10 Dec 1991	Underground	Nerima	56,838
Ueno-Okachimachi	上野御徒町	(E)		12 Dec 2000	Underground	Taitō	56,630
Mizue	瑞江	(S)		14 Sep 1986	Underground	Edogawa	55,028
Ningyocho	人形町	(A)		30 Sep 1962	Underground	Chūō	54,690
Shinjuku Nishiguchi	新宿西口	(E)		12 Dec 2000	Underground	Shinjuku	53,643
Iwamotochō	岩本町	(S)		21 Dec 1978	Underground	Chiyoda	52,330
Tochōmae	都庁前	(E)		19 Dec 1997	Underground	Shinjuku	49,779
Hakusan	白山	(I)		30 Jun 1972	Underground	Bunkyō	48,388
Suidōbashi	水道橋	(I)		30 Jun 1972	Underground	Bunkyō	47,236
Nishi-magome	西馬込	(A)		15 Nov 1968	Underground	Ōta	43,636
Ichinoe	一之江	(S)		14 Sep 1986	Underground	Edogawa	43,043
Onarimon	御成門	(I)		27 Nov 1973	Underground	Minato	43,230
Sumiyoshi	住吉	(S)		21 Dec 1978	Underground	Kōtō	41,577
Nakano Sakaue	中野坂上	(E)		19 Dec 1997	Underground	Nakano	40,469
Kiyosumi-Shirakawa	清澄白河	(E)		12 Dec 2000	Underground	Kōtō	40,727
Shinozaki	篠崎	(S)		14 Sep 1986	Underground	Edogawa	39,512
Shiodome	汐留	(E)		2 Nov 2002	Underground	Minato	39,331
Uchisaiwaichō	内幸町	(I)		27 Nov 1973	Underground	Chiyoda	38,025
Itabashi-Honchō	板橋本町	(I)		27 Dec 1968	Underground	Itabashi	37,555
Akabanebashi	赤羽橋	(E)		12 Dec 2000	Underground	Minato	37,465
Higashi-Shinjuku	東新宿	(E)		12 Dec 2000	Underground	Shinjuku	37,339
Akebonobashi	曙橋	(S)		16 Mar 1980	Underground	Shinjuku	36,403
Itabashi-Kuyakushomae	板橋区役所前	(I)		27 Dec 1968	Underground	Itabashi	35,514
Ryōgoku	両国	(E)		12 Dec 2000	Underground	Sumida	34,318
Yoyogi	代々木	(E)		20 Apr 2000	Underground	Shibuya	32,870
Nishi-Shinjuku Gochōme	西新宿五丁目	(E)		19 Dec 1997	Underground	Shinjuku	32,776
Azabu-Jūban	麻布十番	(E)		12 Dec 2000	Underground	Minato	32,029
Ōjima	大島	(S)		21 Dec 1978	Underground	Kōtō	31,661
Sengoku	千石	(I)		30 Jun 1972	Underground	Bunkyō	31,304
Takaracho	宝町	(A)		28 Feb 1963	Underground	Chūō	31,022
Higashi-Ōjima	東大島	(S)		21 Dec 1978	Elevated	Kōtō	30,424
Shimura-Sakaue	志村坂上	(I)		27 Dec 1968	Underground	Itabashi	30,150
Shimura-Sanchōme	志村三丁目	(I)		27 Dec 1968	Elevated	Itabashi	30,055
Shin-Itabashi	新板橋	(I)		27 Dec 1968	Underground	Itabashi	29,972
Nishi-Sugamo	西巣鴨	(I)		27 Dec 1968	Underground	Toshima	29,560
Shin-Egota	新江古田	(E)		19 Dec 1997	Underground	Nakano	28,904
Wakamatsu-Kawada	若松河田	(E)		12 Dec 2000	Underground	Shinjuku	28,849
Iidabashi	飯田橋	(E)		12 Dec 2000	Underground	Bunkyō	28,807
Shibakōen	芝公園	(I)		27 Nov 1973	Underground	Minato	28,023
Nakanobu	中延	(A)		15 Nov 1968	Underground	Shinagawa	27,903
Takashimadaira	高島平	(I)		27 Dec 1968	Elevated	Itabashi	27,789
Nishi-Ōjima	西大島	(S)		21 Dec 1978	Underground	Kōtō	27,698
Ochiai-Minami-Nagasaki	落合南長崎	(E)		19 Dec 1997	Underground	Shinjuku	27,118
Magome	馬込	(A)		15 Nov 1968	Underground	Ōta	26,346
Nishidai	西台	(I)		27 Dec 1968	Elevated	Itabashi	25,605
Higashi-Nakano	東中野	(E)		19 Dec 1997	Underground	Nakano	25,362
Motohasunuma	本蓮沼	(I)		27 Dec 1968	Underground	Itabashi	25,190
Nakai	中井	(E)		19 Dec 1997	Underground	Shinjuku	25,182
Shirokane-Takanawa	白金高輪	(I)		26 Sep 2000	Underground	Minato	24,798
Kikukawa	菊川	(S)		21 Dec 1978	Underground	Sumida	24,573
Tsukijishijō	築地市場	(E)		12 Dec 2000	Underground	Chūō	23,281
Nerima Kasugachō	練馬春日町	(E)		10 Dec 1991	Underground	Nerima	22,655
Hongō-Sanchōme	本郷三丁目	(E)		12 Dec 2000	Underground	Bunkyō	22,043
Honjo-azumabashi	本所吾妻橋	(A)		4 Dec 1960	Underground	Sumida	21,482
Hamachō	浜町	(S)		21 Dec 1978	Underground	Chūō	21,447
Togoshi	戸越	(A)		15 Nov 1968	Underground	Shinagawa	21,299
Ushigome Yanagichō	牛込柳町	(E)		12 Dec 2000	Underground	Shinjuku	19,954
Hasune	蓮根	(I)		27 Dec 1968	Elevated	Itabashi	19,363
Toshimaen	豊島園	(E)		10 Dec 1991	Underground	Nerima	14,294
Takanawadai	高輪台	(A)		15 Nov 1968	Underground	Minato	13,969
Kokuritsu-Kyōgijō	国立競技場	(E)		20 Apr 2000	Underground	Shinjuku	13,711
Ushigome Kagurazaka	牛込神楽坂	(E)		12 Dec 2000	Underground	Shinjuku	13,686
Nishi-takashimadaira	西高島平	(I)		6 May 1976	Elevated	Itabashi	12,970
Shirokanedai	白金台	(I)		26 Sep 2000	Underground	Minato	10,310
Shin-takashimadaira	新高島平	(I)		6 May 1976	Elevated	Itabashi	9,534

== Stations proposed ==
Station	Japanese	Lines	Opening date
Doshida	土支田	(E)	2040 (planned)
Oizumicho	大泉町	(E)	2040 (planned)
Oizumi-gakuencho	大泉学園町	(E)	2040 (planned)

== Renamed stations ==
Former name		New Name	Line	Renaming date	Opening date
English	Japanese	New Name	Line	Renaming date	Opening date
Shimura	志村	Takashimadaira	(I)	August 1, 1969	December 27, 1968
Edobashi	江戸橋	Nihombashi	(A)	March 19, 1989	February 28, 1963

== See also ==
- List of Tokyo Metro stations
