= Ushigome =

Neighborhood in Tokyo

Coordinates: 35°42′06.59″N 139°44′10.08″E

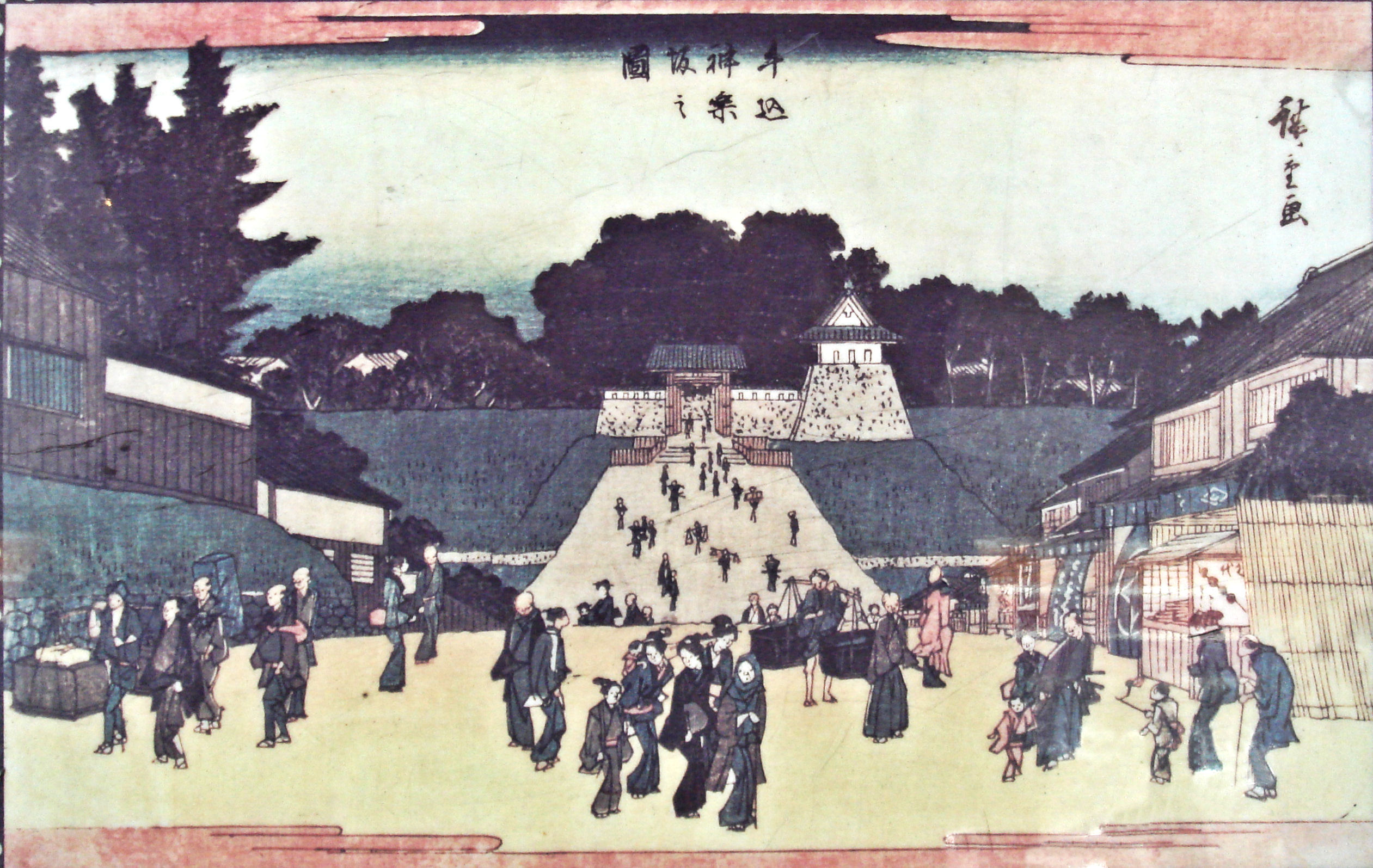
View of Kagurazaka and Ushigome bridge to Edo Castle (牛込神楽坂の図) by Utagawa Hiroshige, 1840.

Ushigome (牛込) is a neighborhood in Shinjuku, Tokyo, and a former ward (牛込区 Ushigome-ku) in the now-defunct Tokyo City. The name Ushigome refers to a former cattle ranch in the area that was next to a horse ranch, Komagome (駒込). In 1947, when the 35 wards of Tokyo were reorganized into 23, it was merged with Yotsuya ward of Tokyo City and Yodobashi suburban ward of Tokyo-fu to form the modern Shinjuku ward.

== Places named after Ushigome ==
- Ushigome bridge, adjacent to Iidabashi Station
- Ushigome moat, a moat that exists between Iidabashi Station and Ichigaya Station. It forms part of the boundary between Shinjuku and Chiyoda wards.
- Ushigome Mitsuke, one of the 36 mitsukes (lookout guard posts) of the Edo Castle, existed on the Chiyoda side of Ushigome bridge. At present only the remains exist.
- Ushigome-kagurazaka Station
- Ushigome-yanagichō Station
