= Kagurazaka (disambiguation) =

Kagurazaka is a neighbourhood in Tokyo, near Iidabashi Station.

Kagurazaka can also refer to:

- Kagurazaka Station, a train station in Shinjuku, Tokyo
- Megumi Kagurazaka (born 1982), a Japanese actress and model
- Shinobu Kagurazaka, a character in Tenjho Tenge
- Asuna Kagurazaka, a character in Negima!
- Ranka Kagurazaka, a character in Valkyrie Drive Bhikkhuni
- Rinka Kagurazaka, a character in Valkyrie Drive Bhikkhuni
