= Wakamatsu-kawada Station =

Metro station in Tokyo, Japan

Wakamatsu-kawada Station 若松河田駅

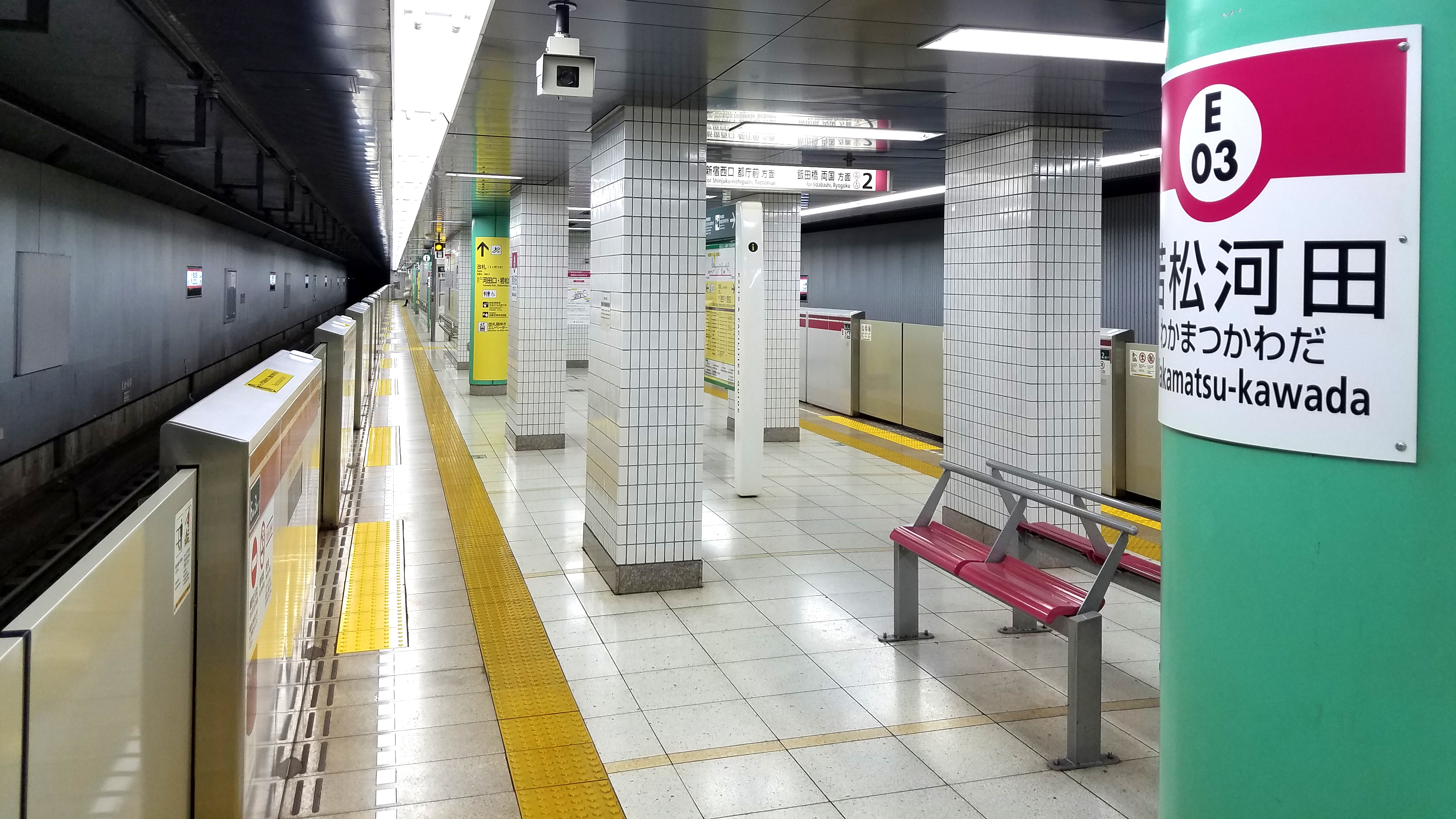
- Platform at Wakamatsu-kawada

General information
- Location: 10-10 Kawada-cho, Shinjuku City, Tokyo; Japan
- Coordinates: 35°41′57″N 139°43′06″E
- Operator: Toei Subway
- Line: Ōedo Line
- Platforms: 1 island platform
- Tracks: 2

Construction
- Structure type: Underground

Other information
- Station code: E-03

History
- Opened: 12 December 2000; 25 years ago

Services
Preceding station	Toei Subway	Following station
Higashi-shinjuku towards Tochōmae	Ōedo Line	Ushigome-yanagichō towards Hikarigaoka
Location
- Location within Tokyo Yamanote Loop Location within Tokyo wards area Location within Japan

Wakamatsu-kawada Station (若松河田駅, wakamatsu kawada eki) is a subway station in the central part of Shinjuku, Tokyo, Japan.

== Lines ==
- Toei Ōedo Line (E-03)

== Platforms ==
The station consists of an island platform serving two tracks.

1	Ōedo Line	for Shinjuku-nishiguchi and Tochomae (Transfer at Tochōmae for Nerima, Hikarigaoka, and Roppongi)
2	Ōedo Line	for Iidabashi and Ryōgoku

== Surroundings ==
- Aikikai Hombu Dojo
- Statistics Bureau of Japan
- Ogasawara-Hakushaku-Tei
- National Institute of Infectious Diseases
- Waseda University

== History ==
In the past, the area was served by Tram Line 13, which was abolished in 1970. After that, there was no alternative rail connections and was instead served by Toei Bus. Afterwards, a new station along the new Toei Line 12 (now known as the Oedo Line) was to be constructed just halfway between Wakamatsucho and Kawatacho.

The closest station to Fuji TV was Akebonobashi Station on the Toei Shinjuku Line.
