= Iidamachi Station =

Railway station in Tokyo, Japan

Coordinates: 35°42′8″N 139°44′56″E

Iidamachi Station 飯田町駅
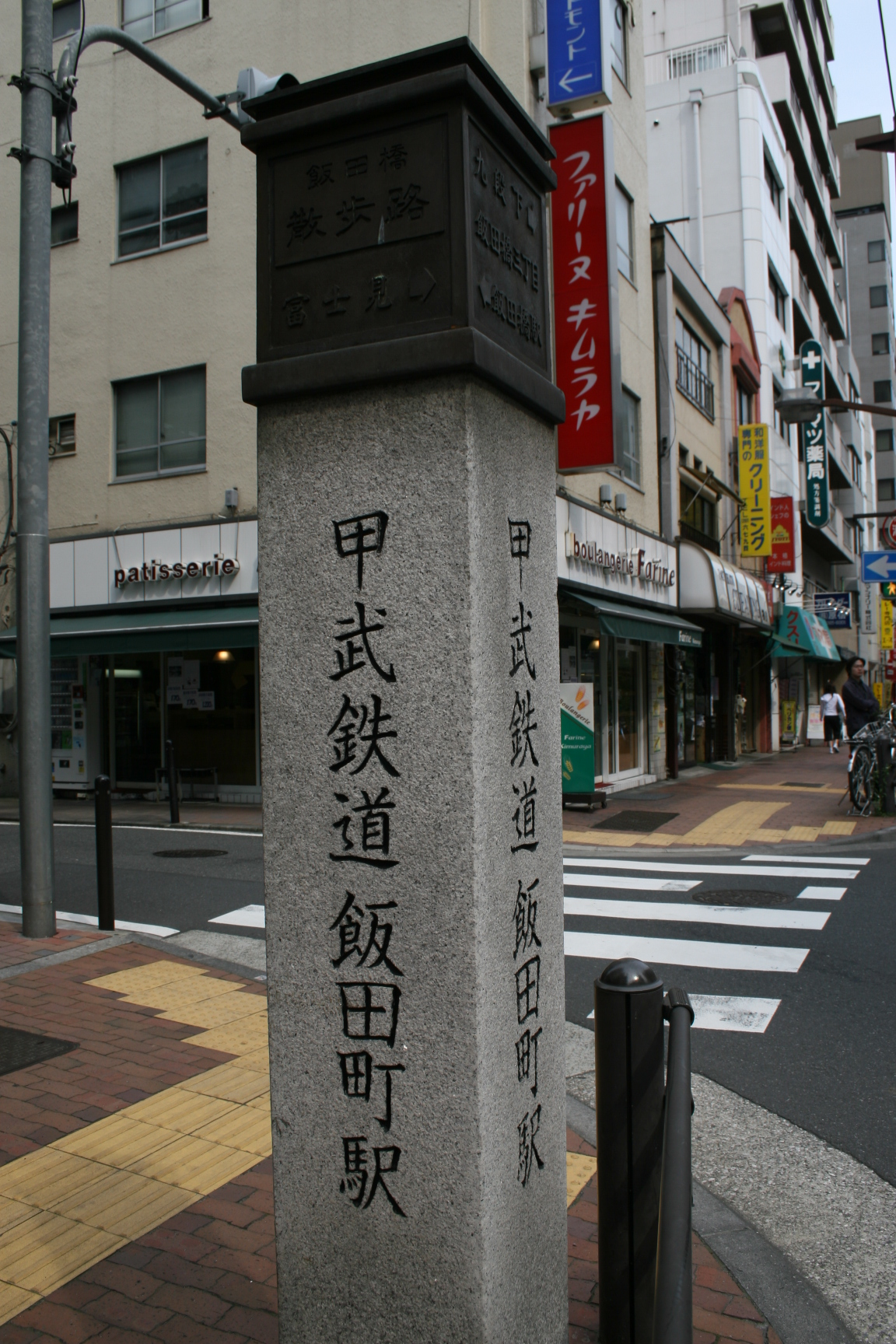
- Monument for the former station reads "Kōbu Railway Iidamachi Station".

General information
- Location: Chiyoda, Tokyo; Japan
- Operator: Japan Freight Railway Company
- Line: Chūō Main Line

History
- Opened: 1895
- Closed: 1999
Location

Iidamachi Station (飯田町駅, Iidamachi-eki) was a railway station on the Chūō Main Line located in Chiyoda, Tokyo, Japan.

Iidamachi Station was operated by Kōbu Railway, Japanese Government Railways, Japanese National Railways and Japan Freight Railway Company (JR Freight). Its location was 0.5 km from Suidōbashi Station and 0.4 km from Iidabashi Station.

The station was built in 1895 as the terminal of the Kōbu Railway, a predecessor of the present Chūō Main Line. It ceased to serve passengers in 1933, but continued to serve freight until 1997.

After the closure, the site of the station was redeveloped and became a business district named I-Garden Air. One of the buildings in the area formerly served as the headquarters of JR Freight, and is now occupied by Daiwa House.

== Timeline ==
- April 3, 1895 - Station opens as the terminal of Kōbu Railway.
- December 30, 1895 - Track between Iidamachi and Shinjuku improves to double track.
- August 21, 1904 - Electric tram service begins between Iidamachi and Nakano.
- September 24, 1906 - Kōbu Railway extends tracks from Iidamachi to Suidōbashi; only tram services operate on the new line.
- October 1, 1906 - Kōbu Railway is nationalized.
- November 15, 1928 - Iidabashi Station opens on the tram line to replace tram service at Iidamachi; Iidamachi continues as the terminal for locomotive trains.
- March 16, 1934 - Another double track is added to existing double track between Iidamachi and Shinjuku.
- July 15, 1933 - Station ceases to serve passenger trains.
- June 1, 1949 - Japanese National Railways is established.
- November 1, 1986 - Station ceases to serve baggage trains.
- April 1, 1987 - Japanese National Railways is dissolved; Iidamachi Station belongs to JR Freight.
- March 22, 1997 - Station ceases to serve freight trains.
- March 9, 1999 - Station officially closes.
