= Ushigome-kagurazaka Station =

Metro station in Tokyo, Japan

Coordinates: 35°42′3.07″N 139°44′8.89″E

Ushigome-kagurazaka Station 牛込神楽坂駅

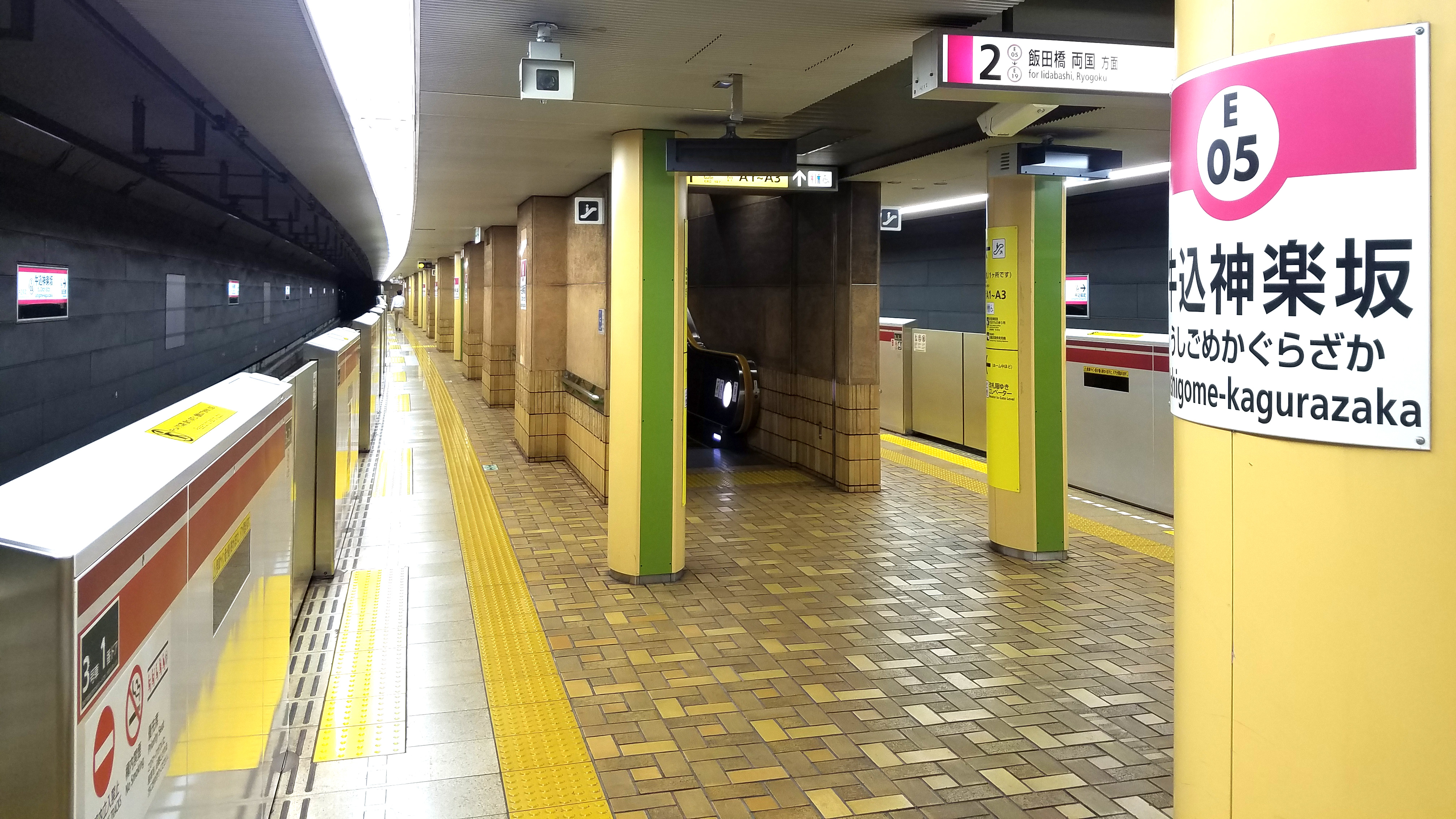
- Platform level of Ushigome-kagurazaka Station

General information
- Location: 15 Tansu-cho, Shinjuku City, Tokyo; Japan
- Operator: Toei Subway
- Line: Ōedo Line
- Platforms: 1 island platform
- Tracks: 2
- Connections: Kagurazaka

Construction
- Structure type: Underground

Other information
- Station code: E-05

History
- Opened: 20 December 2000; 25 years ago

Services
| Preceding station | Toei Subway | Following station |
|---|---|---|
| Ushigome-yanagichō towards Tochōmae | Ōedo Line | Iidabashi towards Hikarigaoka |
Location
- Location within Tokyo Yamanote Loop Location within Tokyo wards area Location within Japan

Ushigome-kagurazaka Station (牛込神楽坂駅) is a subway station in Shinjuku, Tokyo, Japan. Its station number is E-05. The station is near Kagurazaka.

== Line ==
- Toei Ōedo Line

== Platforms ==
The station consists of an island platform serving two tracks.

| 1 | Ōedo Line | for Shinjuku-nishiguchi and Tochomae (Transfer at Tochōmae for Nerima, Hikarigaoka, and Roppongi) |
| 2 | Ōedo Line | for Iidabashi and Ryōgoku |

== Ridership ==
In 2018, the station saw an average daily usage of 15,237 passengers.

== Surroundings ==
- Tully's Coffee Kagurasaka branch
- Eiken Foundation of Japan
- Toei Animation
- Obunsha Co., Ltd.
- Shinchosha Publishing Co, Ltd.
- Tokyo Metropolitan Senior High School of the Arts
- Michio Miyagi Memorial Hall
- Office of the Chief Justice of Japan
