= Nishi-shinjuku-gochome Station =

Metro station in Tokyo, Japan

Coordinates: 35.6897°N 139.6844°E

Nishi-shinjuku-gochome Station 西新宿五丁目駅

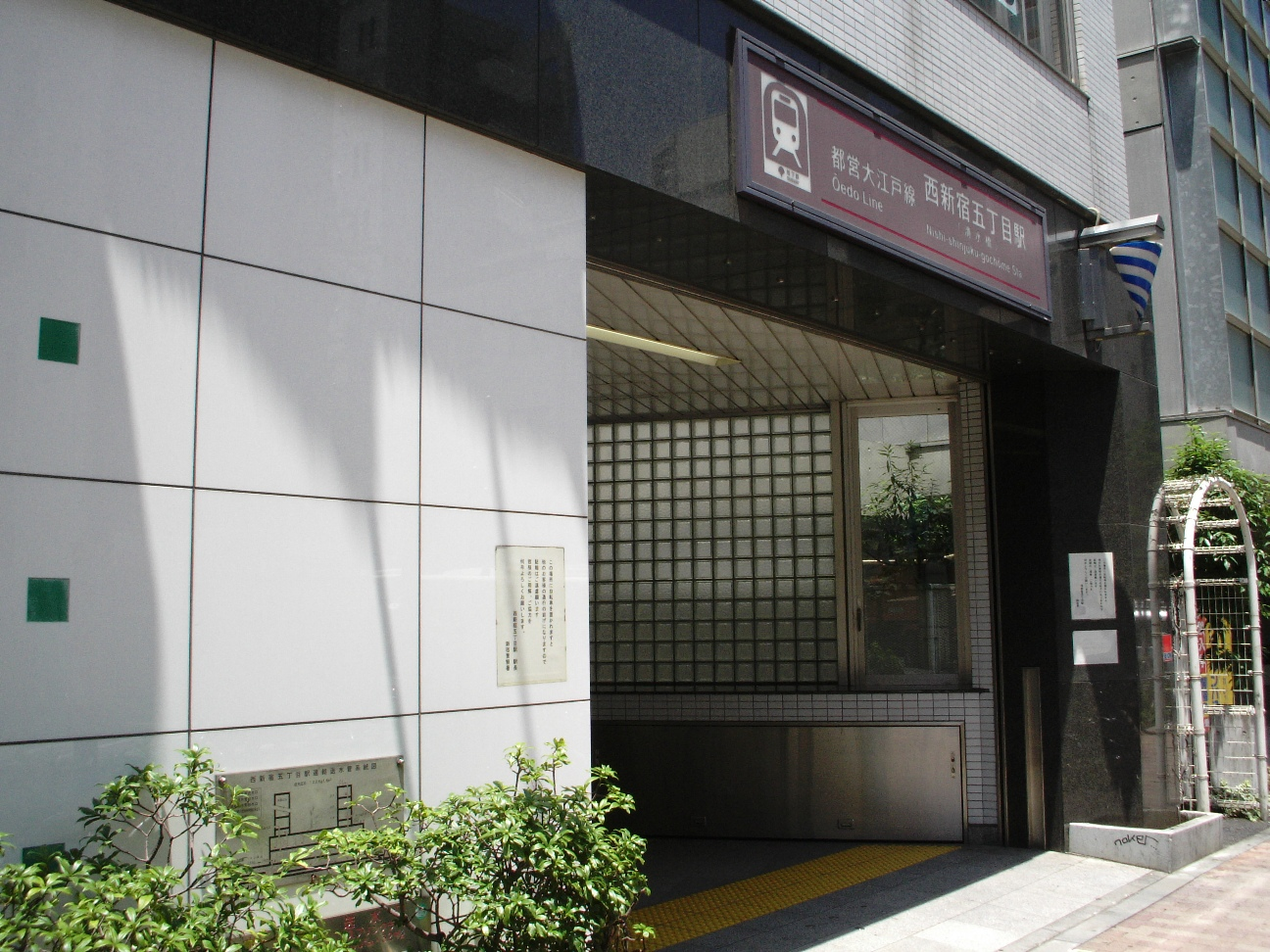
- Entrance A1

General information
- Location: 5-25-9 Nishi-Shinjuku, Shinjuku City, Tokyo; Japan
- Operator: Toei Subway
- Line: Ōedo Line
- Platforms: 1 island platform
- Tracks: 2
- Connections: Bus stop

Construction
- Structure type: Underground

Other information
- Station code: E-29

History
- Opened: 19 December 1997; 28 years ago

Services
| Preceding station | Toei Subway | Following station |
|---|---|---|
| Nakano-sakaue towards Hikarigaoka | Ōedo Line | Tochōmae towards Tochōmae |
Location
- Location within Tokyo Yamanote Loop Location within Tokyo wards area Location within Japan

Nishi-shinjuku-gochome Station (西新宿五丁目駅, Nishishinjuku Gochōme-eki) (alternative name 清水橋駅 Shimizubashi Station) is a train station on the Toei Oedo Line. It is operated by the Tokyo Metropolitan Bureau of Transportation.

== Surrounding area ==
Nishi-Shinjuku Gochome is a residential area west of Shinjuku. This station is at the heart of Nishi-Shinjuku's residential high rise area. Shinjuku Central park is a short walk east of the station. The Toho educational group has many schools within walking distance of the station. Nishi-Shinjuku Gochome also has a small commercial center.

== Station layout ==
Like most stations on the Oedo line, this station has an island platform serving two tracks.

| 1 | Ōedo Line | for Nerima and Hikarigaoka |
| 2 | Ōedo Line | for Tochōmae, Roppongi and Iidabashi |

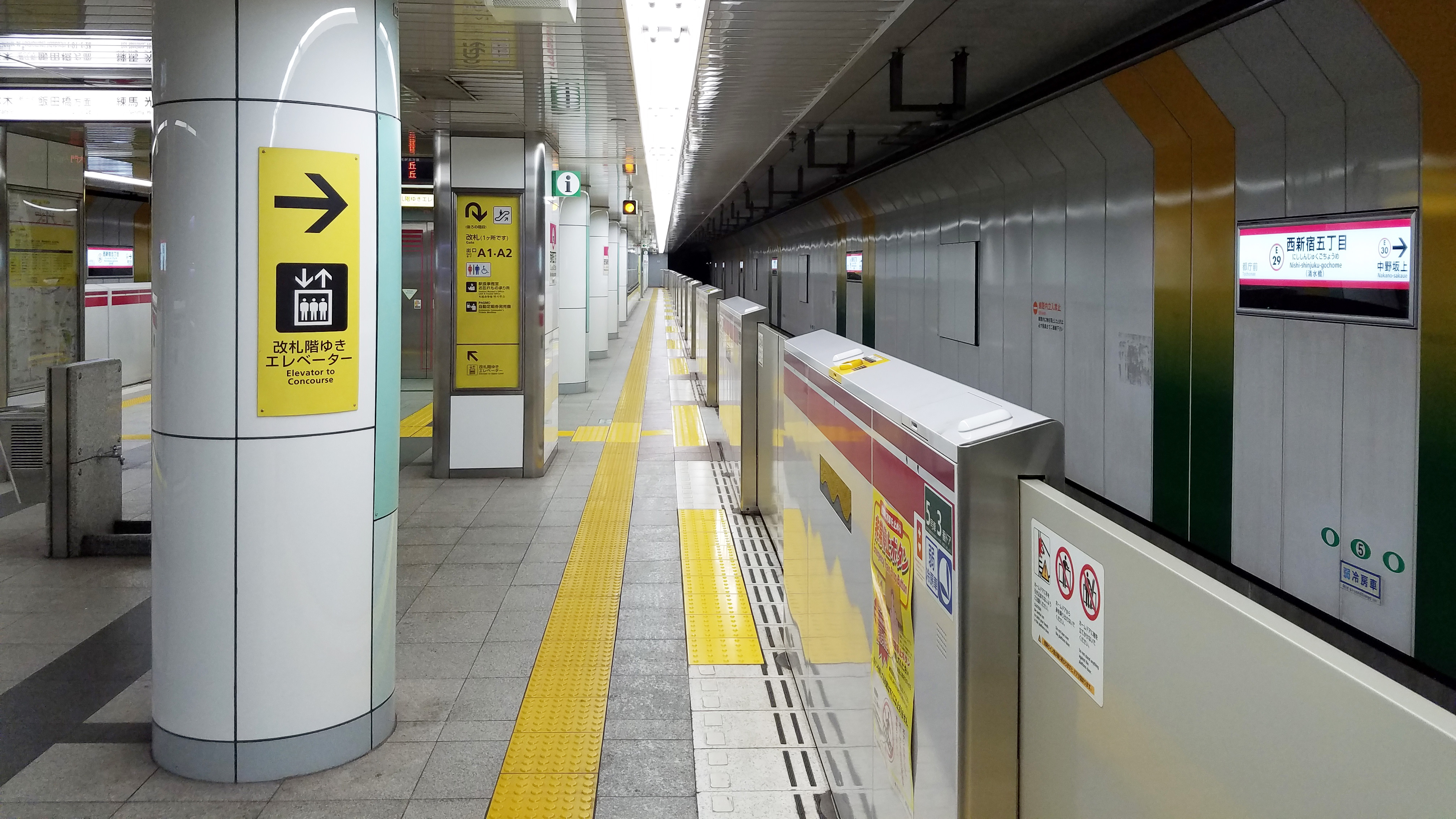
Platforms, 2017

== History ==
The station opened on 19 December 1997.

== Ridership ==
As of 2018, the station saw a daily patronage of 36,090 passengers.

== Surrounding area ==
- Graduate School of Film Producing
- Shibuya honmachi gakuen Elementary School and Junior High School
- Ito En
- Toei Bus Shibuya Depot, Shinjuku Branch Office
- Kanto International Senior High School
- Tokyu Stay Nishi-Shinjuku hotel

== Buses ==
Nishi-Shinjuku Gochome is served by the Keio Dentetsu Bus Company. Two bus lines pass through this station. All eastbound buses are bound for Shinjuku. Westbound, the 33 bus heads to Eifukucho and the 32 heads in a similar direction. West of the station at the Shimizubashi intersection, the 64 Keio bus heads North to Nakano Sakaue Station and Nakano Station while the southbound buses head to Shibuya Station.
