= Ushigome-yanagichō Station =

Metro station in Tokyo, Japan

Coordinates: 35°41′58.26″N 139°43′30.10″E

Ushigome-yanagichō Station 牛込柳町駅

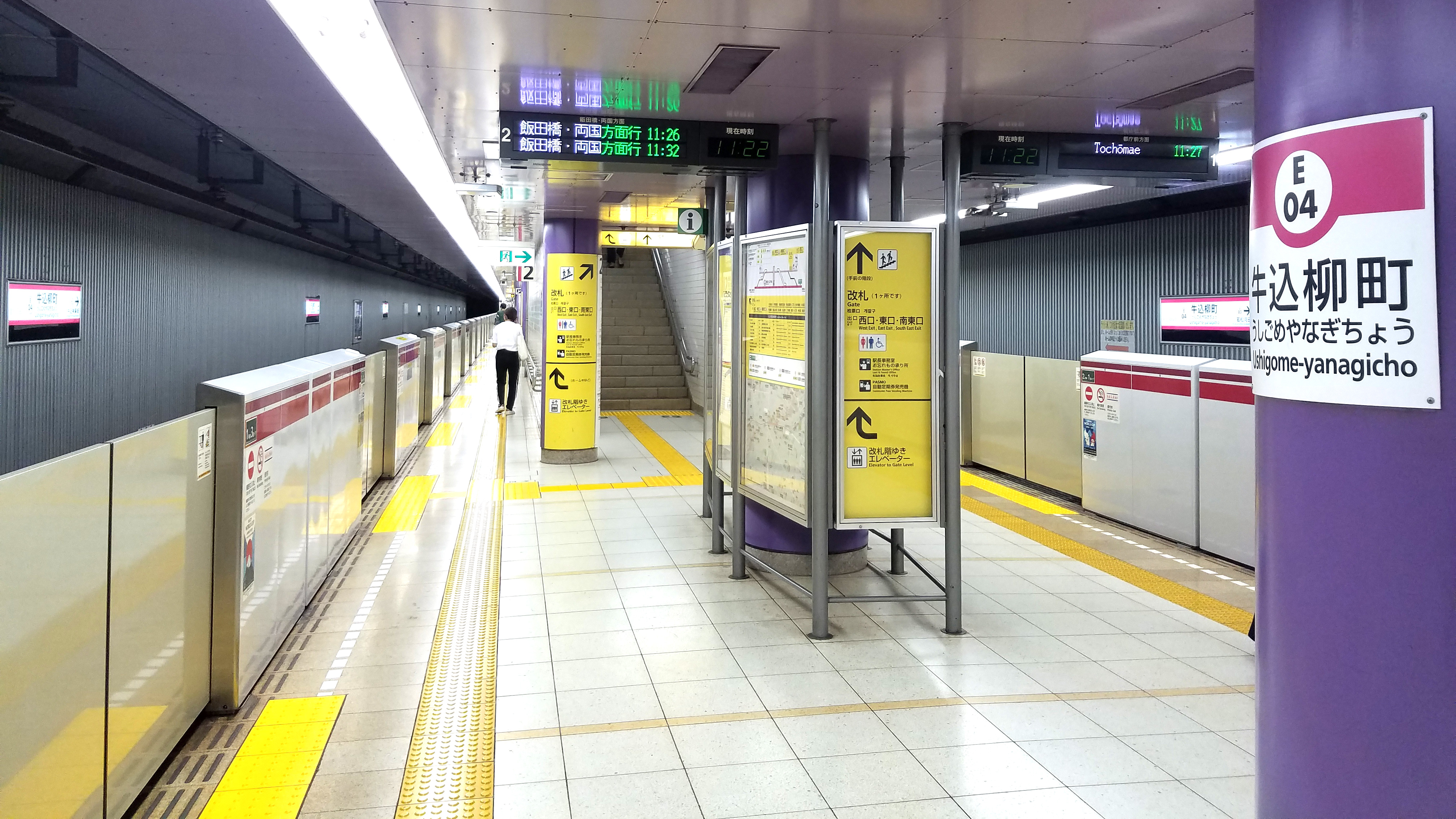
- Ushigome-yanagichō Station platforms, 2019

General information
- Location: 2–32 Haramachi, Shinjuku City, Tokyo （新宿区原町2-32） Japan
- Operator: Toei Subway
- Line: Ōedo Line
- Platforms: 1 island platform
- Tracks: 2

Construction
- Structure type: Underground

Other information
- Station code: E-04

History
- Opened: 12 December 2000; 25 years ago

Passengers
- FY2011: 18,531 daily

Services
Preceding station	Toei Subway	Following station
Wakamatsu-kawada towards Tochōmae	Ōedo Line	Ushigome-kagurazaka towards Hikarigaoka
Location
- Location within Tokyo Yamanote Loop Location within Tokyo wards area Location within Japan

Ushigome-yanagichō Station (牛込柳町駅, Ushigome-yanagichō-eki) is a subway station on the Toei Oedo Line in Shinjuku, Tokyo, Japan, operated by the Tokyo subway operator Tokyo Metropolitan Bureau of Transportation (Toei). It is numbered "E-04".

== Lines ==
Ushigome-yanagichō Station is served by the Toei Oedo Line, and lies 36.9 km from the starting point of the line at Hikarigaoka.

== Station layout ==
The station consists of an underground island platform on the third basement ("B3F") level serving two tracks. The ticket machines and barriers are located on the first basement ("B1F") level.

=== Platforms ===
1	Ōedo Line	for Shinjuku-nishiguchi and Tochomae (Transfer at Tochōmae for Nerima, Hikarigaoka, and Roppongi)
2	Ōedo Line	for Iidabashi and Ryōgoku

== History ==
Ushigome-yanagichō Station opened on 12 December 2000.

== Passenger statistics ==
In fiscal 2011, the station was used by an average of 18,531 passengers daily.
