= Higashi-shinjuku Station =

Metro station in Tokyo, Japan

Coordinates: 35°41′52.52″N 139°42′27.47″E

Higashi-shinjuku Station 東新宿駅

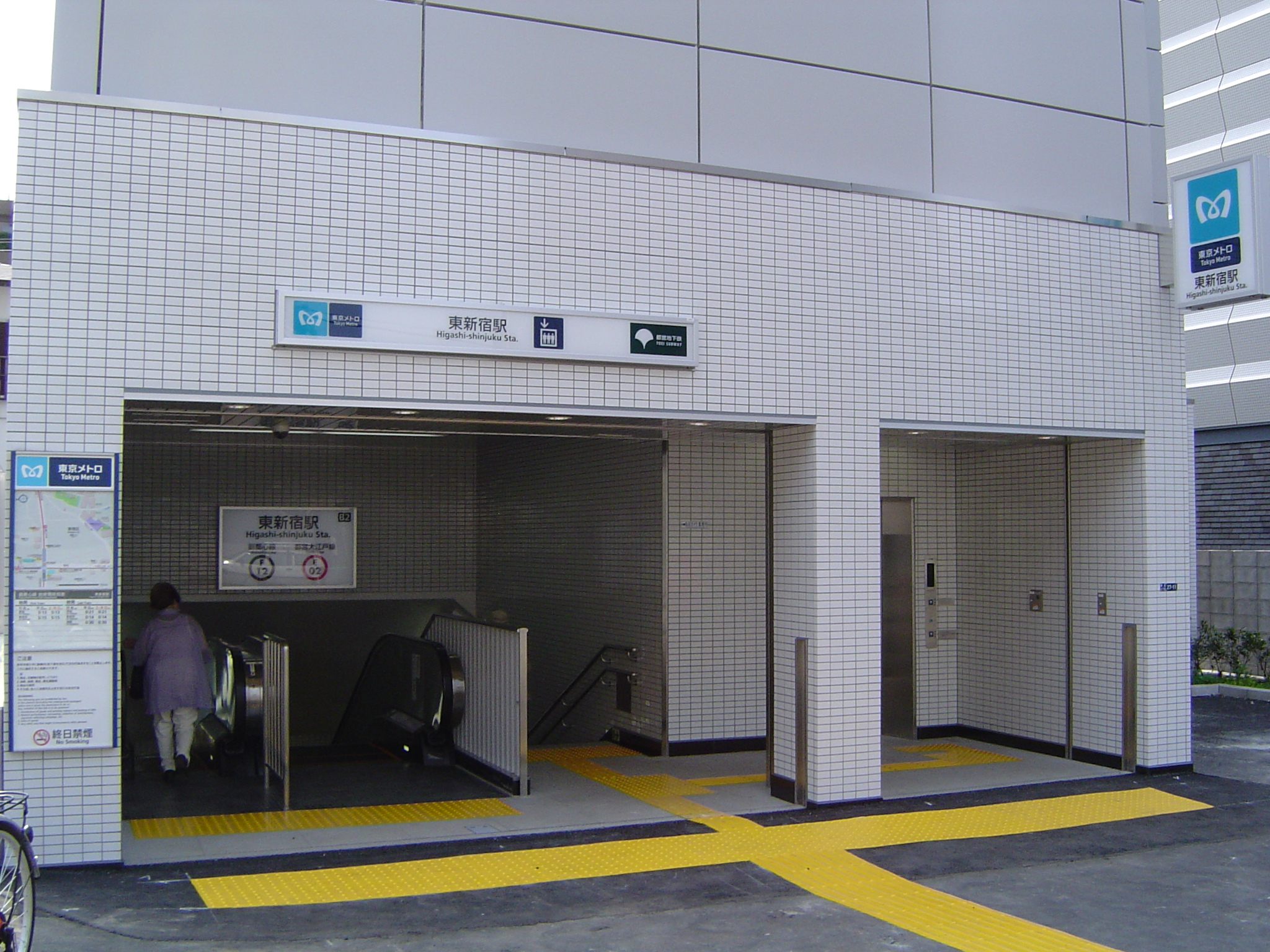
- Entrance B2 in June 2008

General information
- Location: 7-23 Shinjuku, Shinjuku-ku, Tokyo; Japan
- Operator: Toei Subway; Tokyo Metro
- Lines: Ōedo Line; Fukutoshin Line
- Platforms: 3 island platforms
- Tracks: 6

Construction
- Structure type: Underground
- Platform levels: 3

Other information
- Station code: E-02, F-12

History
- Opened: 12 December 2000; 25 years ago

Services
| Preceding station | Tokyo Metro | Following station |
|---|---|---|
| Shinjuku-sanchome towards Shibuya | Fukutoshin Line Local | Nishi-waseda towards Wakoshi |
| Preceding station | Toei Subway | Following station |
| Shinjuku-nishiguchi towards Tochōmae | Ōedo Line | Wakamatsu-kawada towards Hikarigaoka |
Location
- Location within Tokyo Yamanote Loop Location within Tokyo wards area Location within Japan

Higashi-shinjuku Station (東新宿駅, Higashi-shinjuku-eki) is a subway station in Shinjuku, Tokyo, Japan, operated by the two Tokyo subway operators Tokyo Metropolitan Bureau of Transportation (Toei) and Tokyo Metro.

== Lines ==
Higashi-Shinjuku Station is served by the Toei Oedo Line and the Tokyo Metro Fukutoshin Line. The station is numbered E-02 for the Toei Oedo Line, and F-12 for the Fukutoshin Line.

== Station layout ==
The platforms and tracks are located underground.

=== Toei platforms ===
The Toei platform is an island platform serving two tracks located on the third basement ("B3F") level.

| 1 | Ōedo Line | for Tochōmae (Transfer at Tochōmae for Nerima, Hikarigaoka, and Roppongi) |
| 2 | Ōedo Line | for Iidabashi and Ryōgoku |

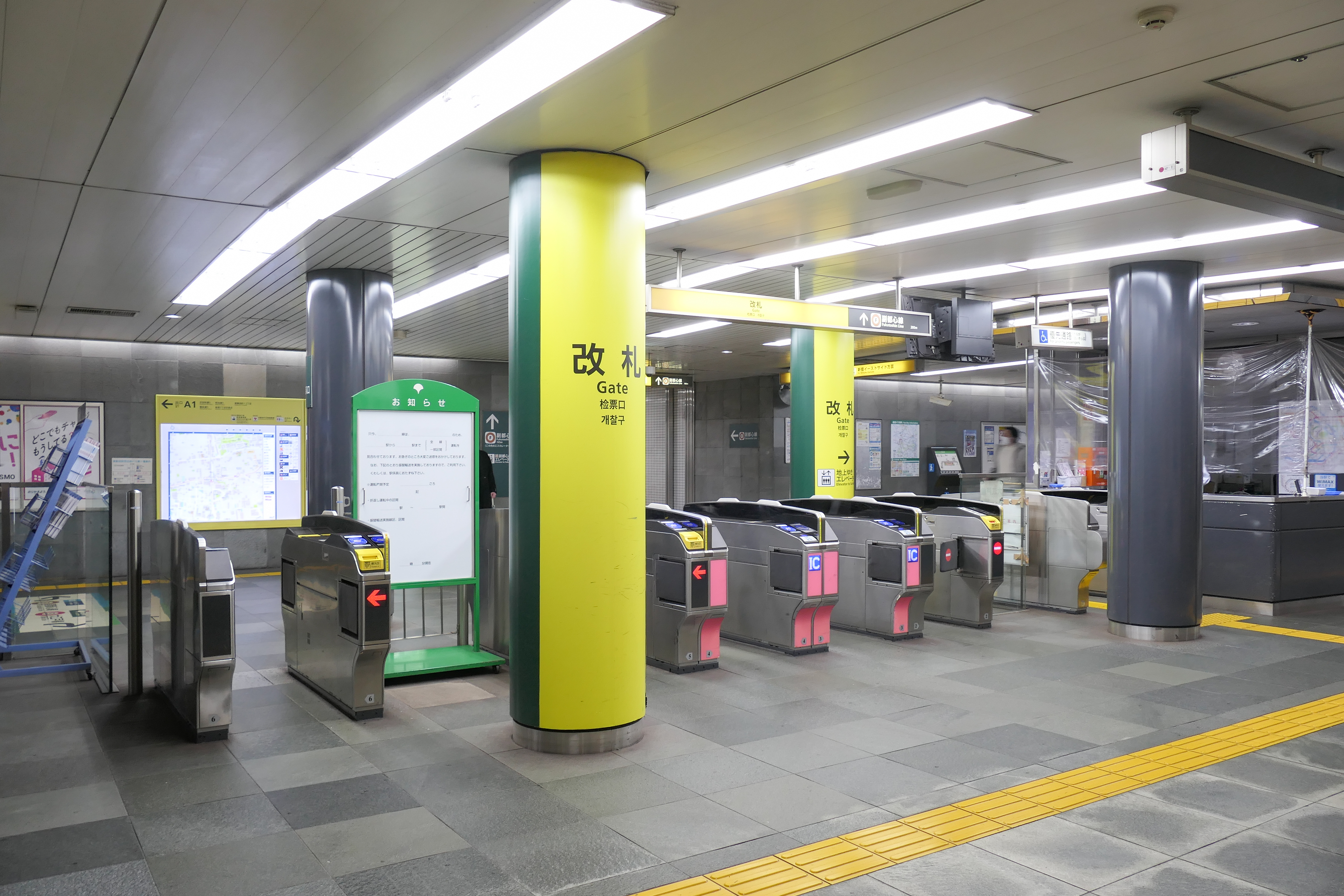
Ticket gates

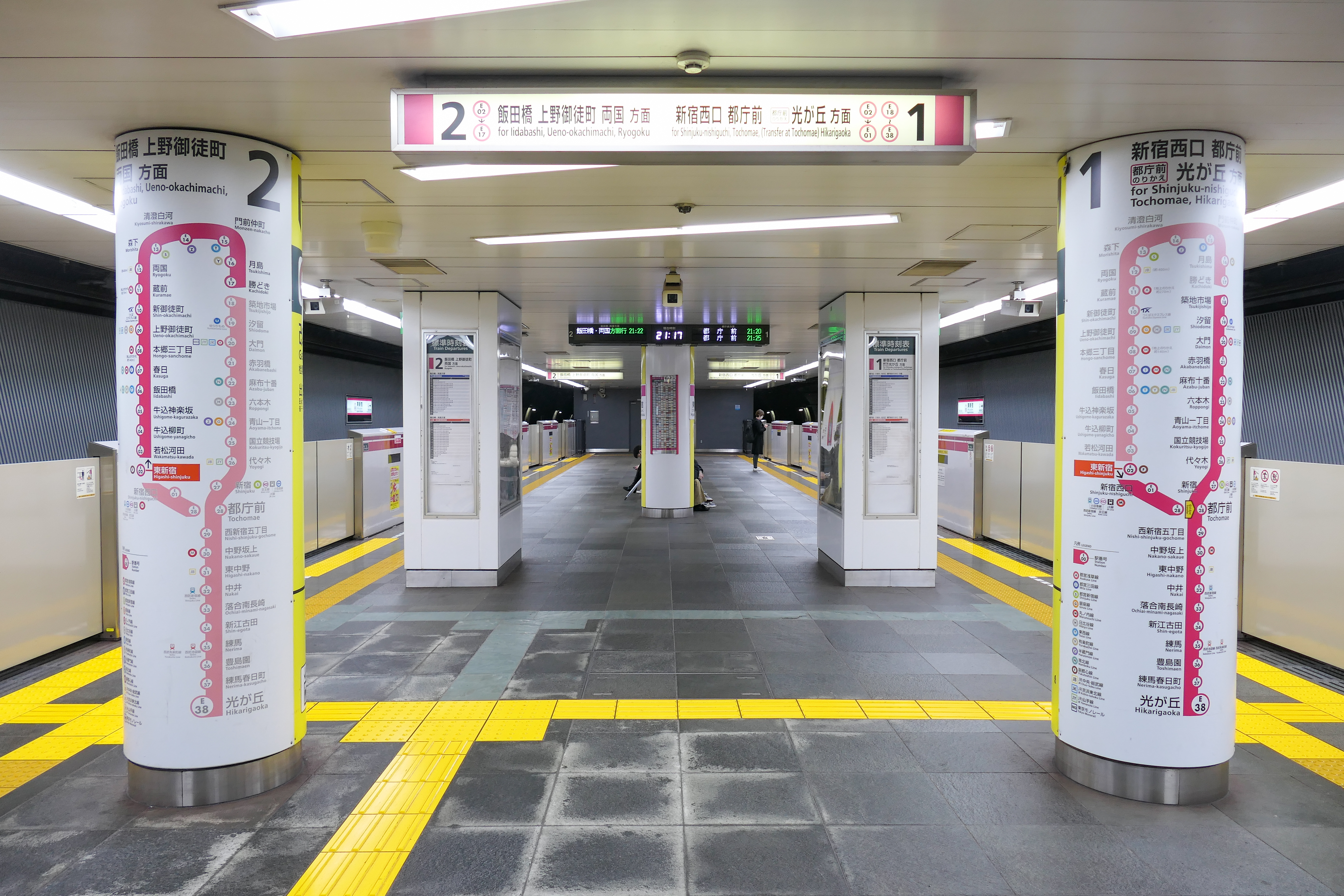
Ōedo Line platforms

=== Tokyo Metro platforms ===
The Tokyo Metro station has two island platforms each serving two tracks, with platform 1/2 (southbound) on the fifth basement ("B5F") level and platform 3/4 (northbound) on the sixth basement ("B6F") level. Non-stop trains (Express and Commuter Express) pass stopping (Local) trains at this station.

| 1/2 | Fukutoshin Line | for Shinjuku-sanchōme and Shibuya; Tokyu Toyoko Line for Yokohama; Minatomirai Line for Motomachi-Chukagai |
| 3/4 | Fukutoshin Line | for Ikebukuro and Wakōshi; Tobu Tojo Line for Kawagoeshi and Shinrinkoen; Seibu Yurakucho Line and Seibu Ikebukuro Line for Nerima, Tokorozawa and Hannō |

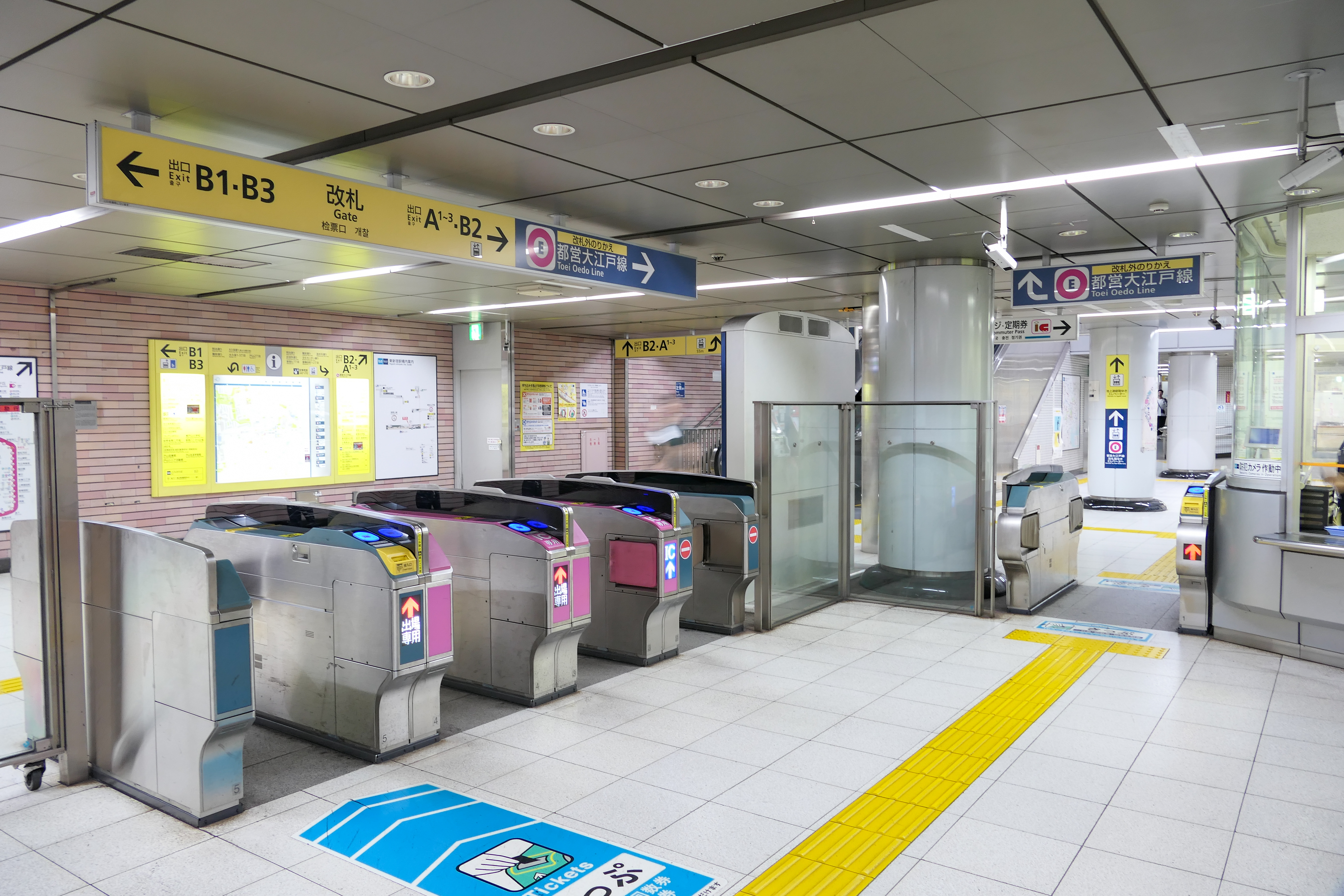
Ticket gates

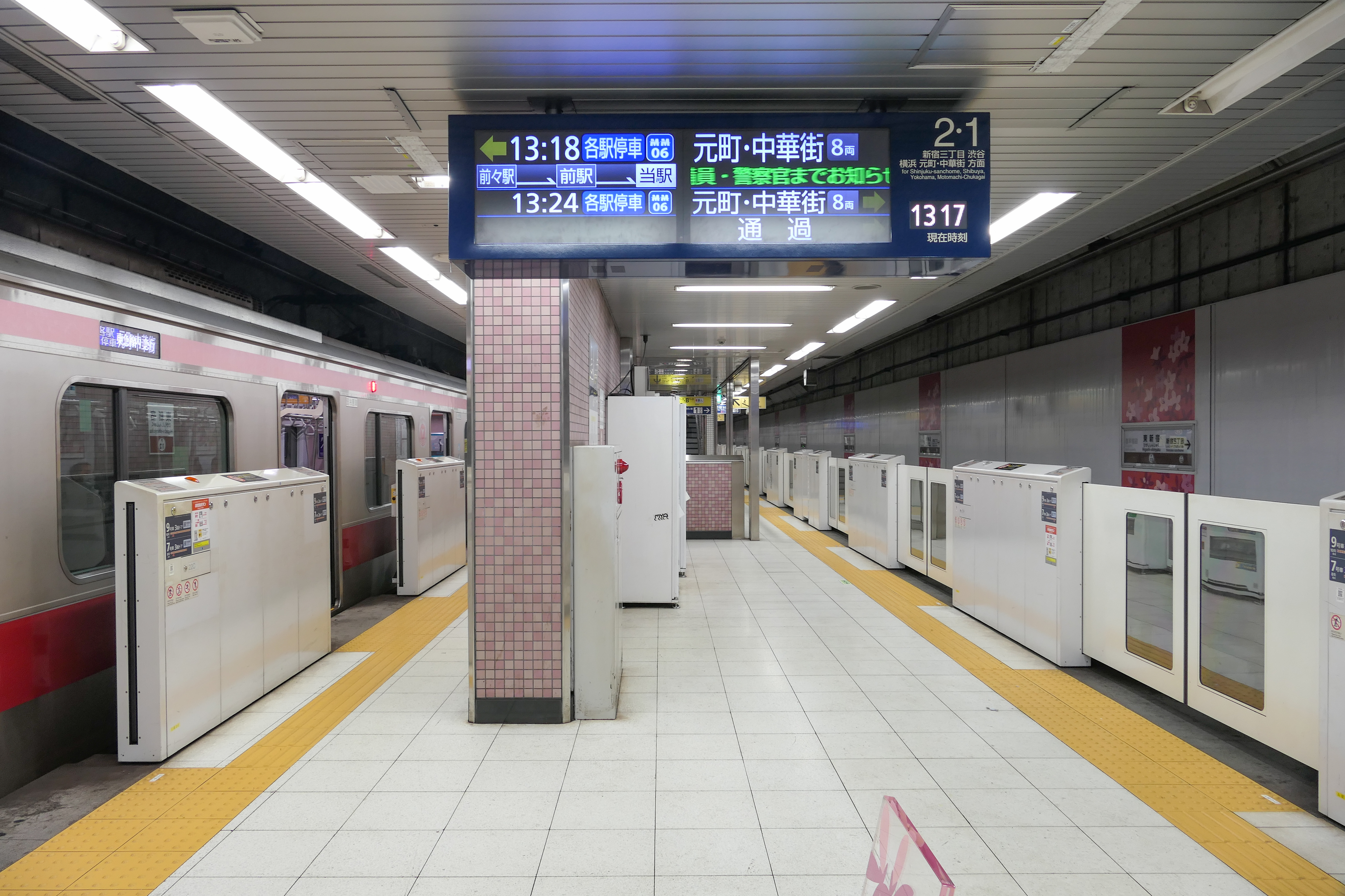
Fukutoshin Line platforms 1 and 2

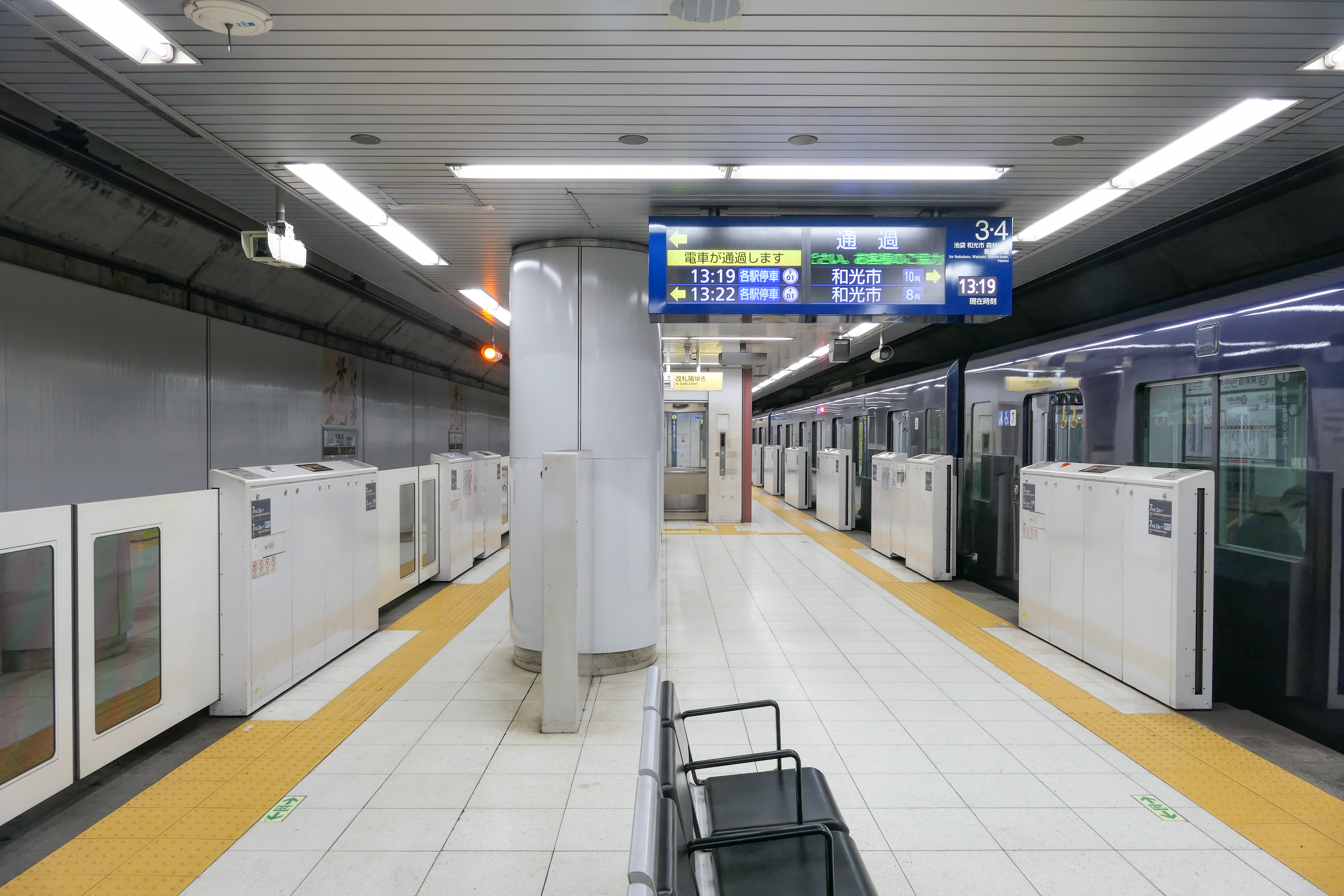
Fukutoshin Line platforms 3 and 4

== History ==
The station opened on 12 December 2000, with the opening of the Toei Oedo Line. The Tokyo Metro Fukutoshin Line part of the station opened on 14 June 2008.

The two Tokyo Metro island platforms initially used only one track each, with the second tracks for passing non-stop trains hidden behind screens. The Shibuya-bound platform was numbered 1, and the Wakoshi-bound platform was numbered 2. The screens were removed some time in 2015.

== Passenger statistics ==
In fiscal 2011, the Toei station was used by an average of 21,552 passengers daily, and the Tokyo Metro Station was used by 20,188.

== Surrounding area ==
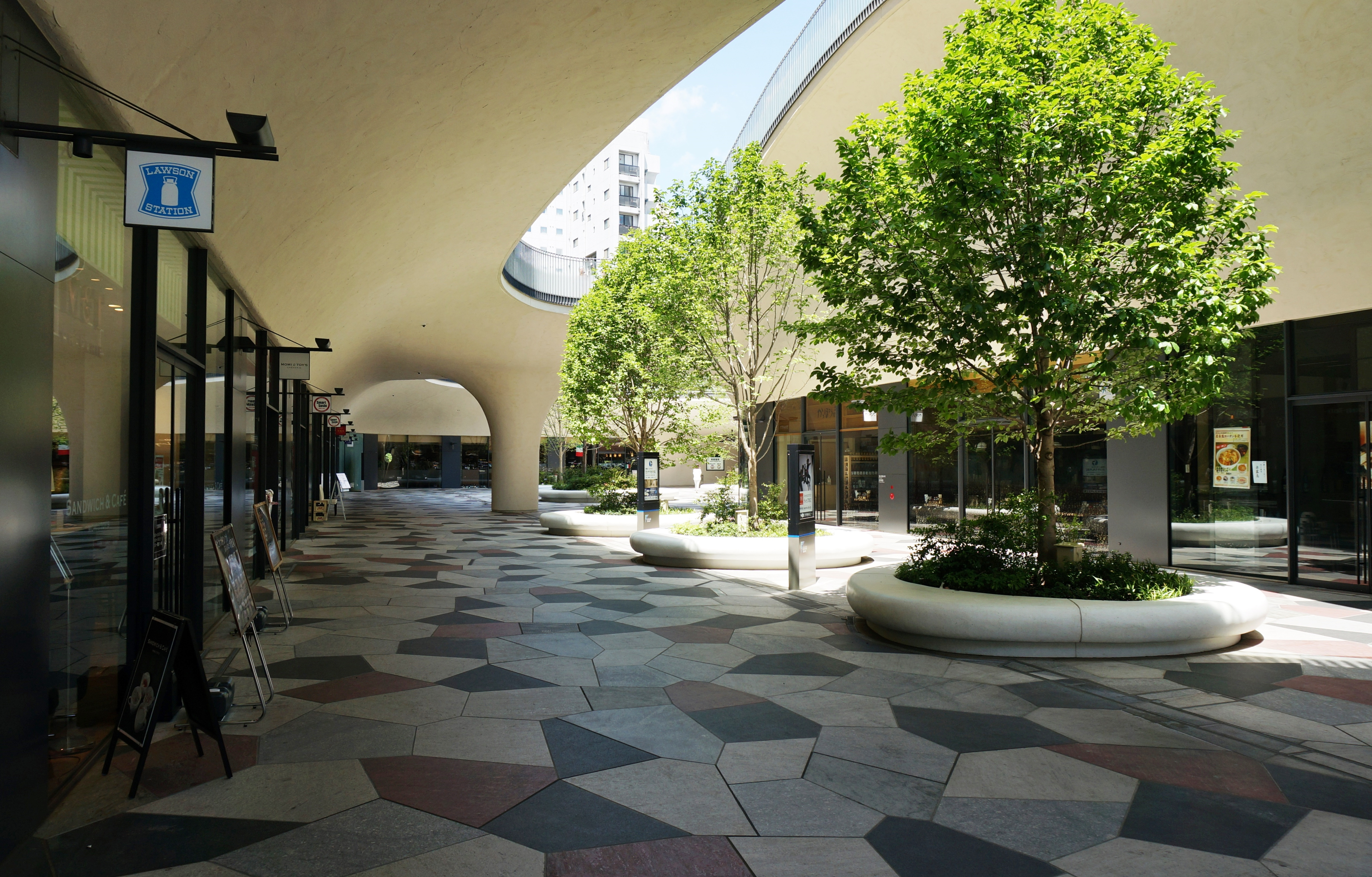
Eastside Square

- Nissin Foods Tokyo Headquarters
- Shinjuku Eastside Square commercial complex (Exit A3), including the headquarters of Citigroup and Square Enix

== See also ==
- List of railway stations in Japan
