= Kagurazaka =

Neighborhood in Tokyo, Japan

Coordinates: 35°42′05″N 139°44′25″E

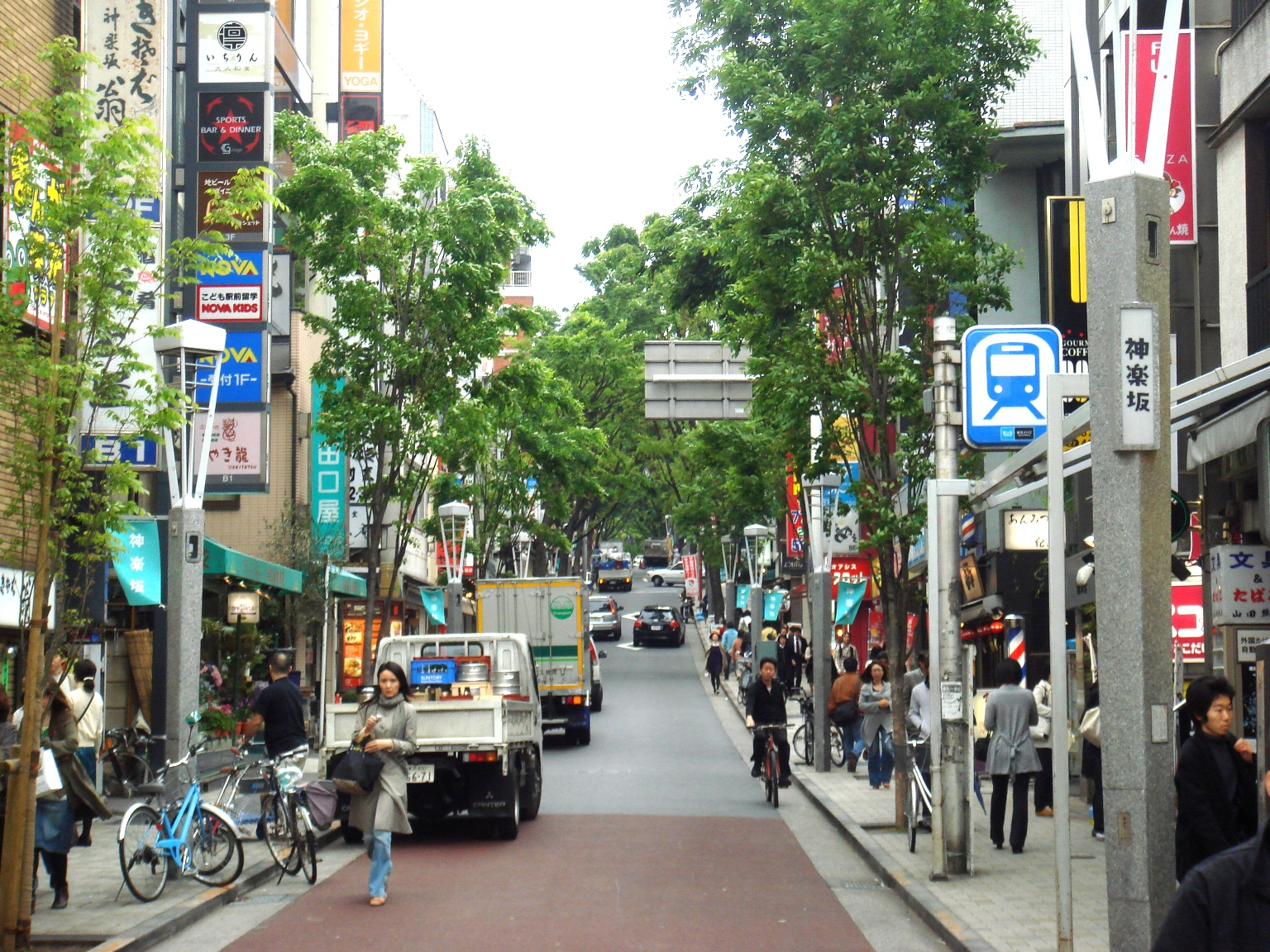
Lower portion of Kagurazaka street.

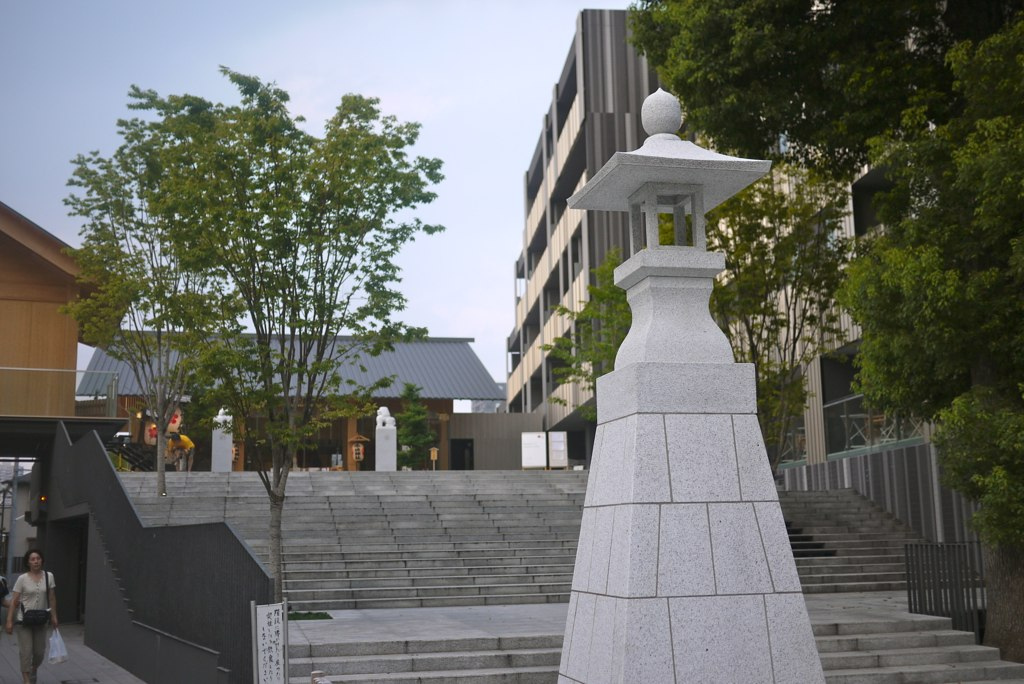
Akagi Shrine complex, designed by Kengo Kuma.

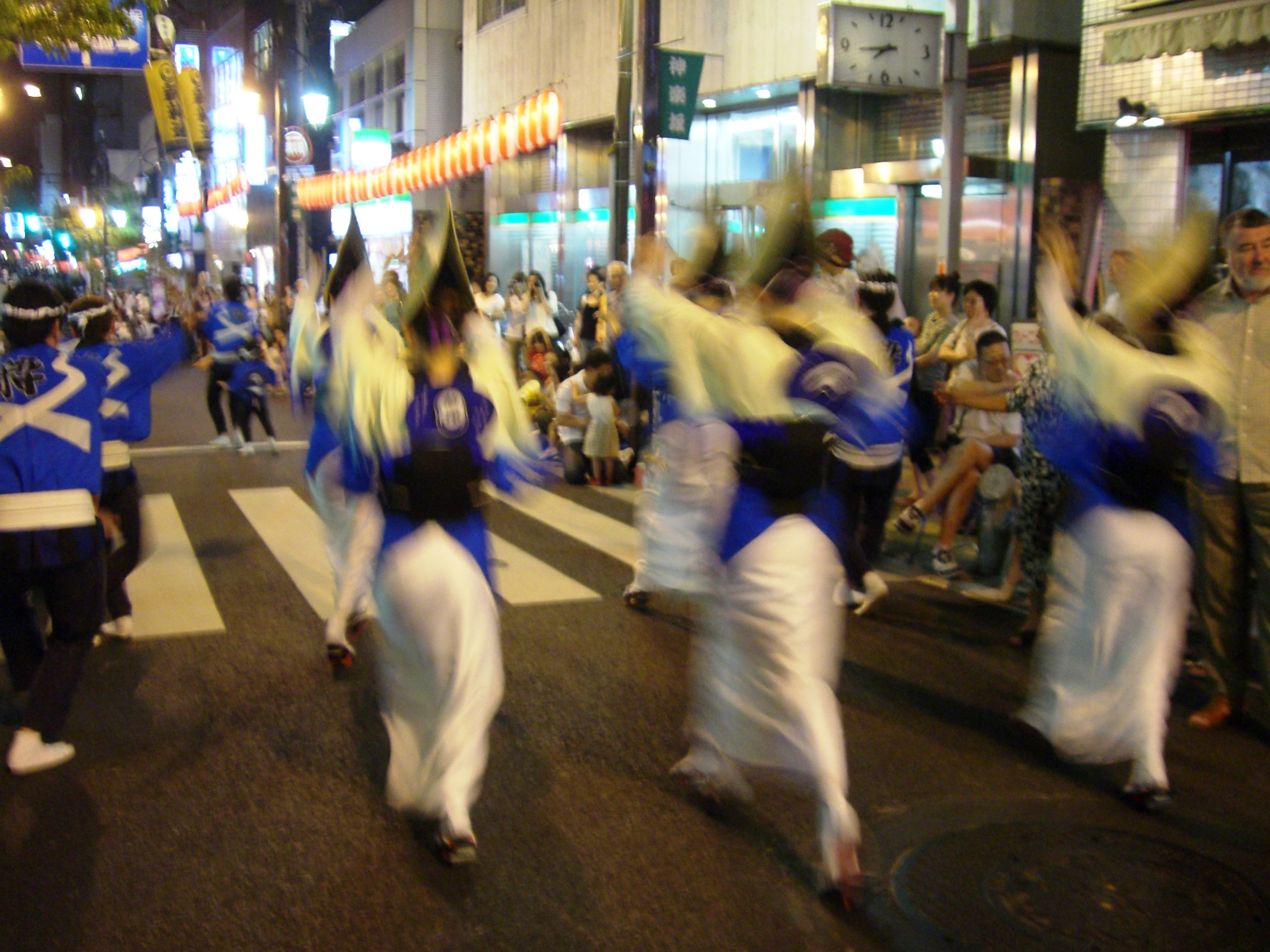
July 2007 Awa Odori in Kagurazaka.

Kagurazaka (神楽坂) is a neighbourhood in Tokyo northwest of Iidabashi Station. It has a shopping street at its center, lined by numerous cafés and restaurants. It is served by Tokyo Metro Tozai Line and Toei Oedo Line.

== History ==
The main road of Kagurazaka was once at the outer edge of Edo Castle, opposite the Ushigome bridge over the castle moat, and has always been busy because of this privileged location. In the early 20th century, the area was renowned for its numerous geisha houses, of which several remain today. Currently, Kagurazaka is experiencing a popularity boom due to its traditional atmosphere on the edge of modern Shinjuku ward, the existence of the original campus of Tokyo University of Science and its proximity to Waseda University. The area is also home to a number of publishing houses.

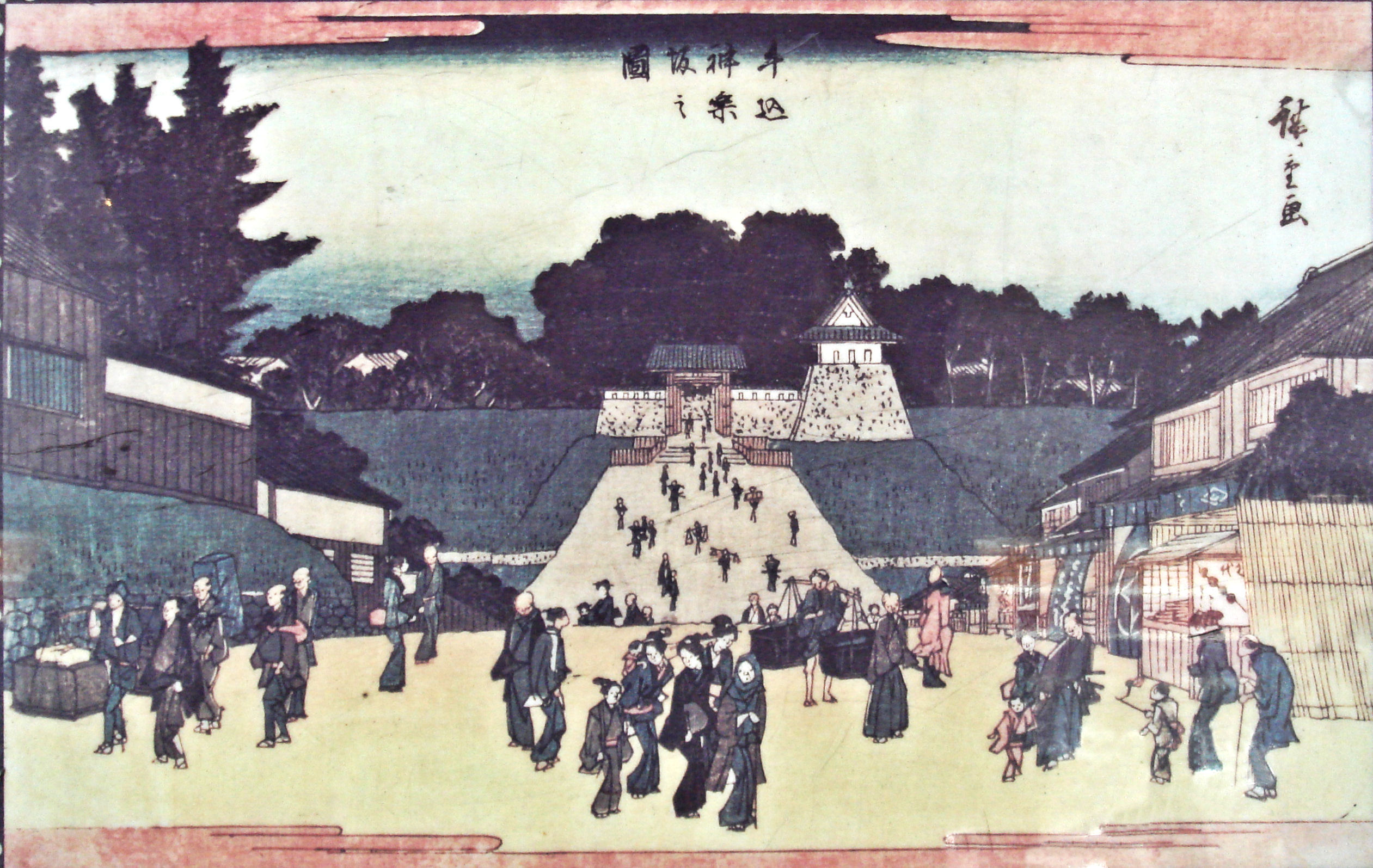
View of Kagurazaka and Ushigome bridge to Edo Castle (牛込神楽坂の図) by Utagawa Hiroshige, 1840.

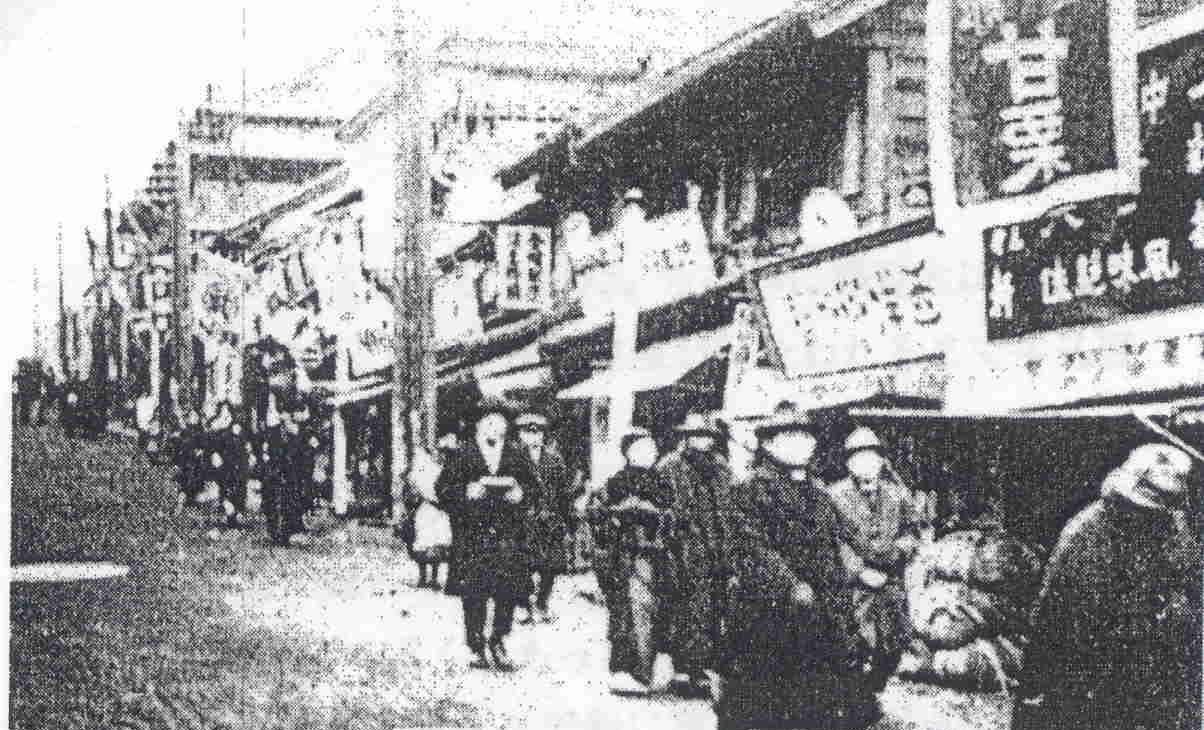
Kagurazaka in 1908.

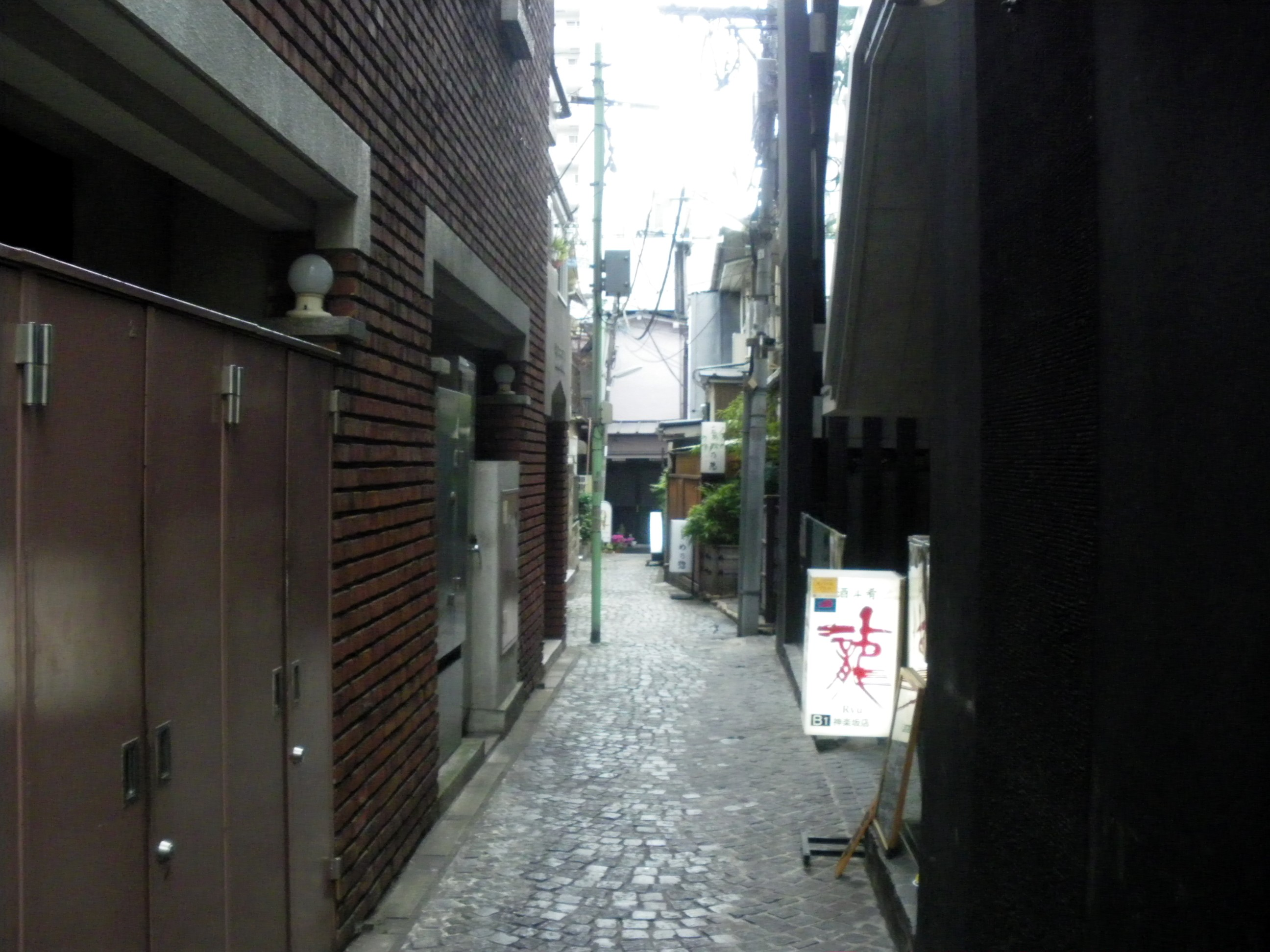
An old backstreet in Kagurazaka.

While it retains a traditional Japanese atmosphere, Kagurazaka now has a significant French presence with many French expatriates living in the area due to the proximity of l'Institut Franco-Japonais de Tokyo and the Lycée Franco-Japonais de Tokyo's primary section. Kagurazaka also has Tokyo's largest concentration of French eateries, bakeries and cheese shops. l'Institut Franco-Japonais holds a lively program of cultural events, food tastings, and film screenings.

Kagurazaka is also widely regarded as an important center of Japanese cuisine within the Kanto region. Several old and famous ryōtei are to be found in the winding back streets, often accessible only by foot. These provide expensive kaiseki cuisine, generally regarded as the pinnacle of Japanese food. They also allow diners to invite geisha to provide entertainment during the evening. Many shops in the area cater to this culture, especially selling kimono, Japanese sweets, and tea.

Singer Hanko Kagurazaka began her career working as a geisha in Kagurazaka in the late 1940s, using the neighborhood’s name as the surname of her stage name.

== Festivals ==
The Kagurazaka Awa Odori (Japanese: 阿波踊り) festival (originating in Tokushima) is held the fourth Friday and Saturday each July. The Kagurazaka connection to the dance goes back to the Edo era, when the Tokugawa daimyō donated the Ushigome Mitsuke. This is the fortified gate at the bottom of the Kagurazaka hill, on the opposite side of the canal. Today, only its foundations remain, just to the south of JR Iidabashi station.

== Religious buildings ==
Akagi Shrine (赤城神社 Akagi Jinja) was formerly at the top end of Kagurazaka. It was redeveloped with a new shrine and apartment complex, designed by Kengo Kuma and opened to the public in September 2010.

== See also ==
- Kagurazaka Station
- Ushigome-kagurazaka Station
