= Kagurazaka Station =

Metro station in Tokyo, Japan

Coordinates: 35°42′14.04″N 139°44′3.25″E

Kagurazaka Station 神楽坂駅

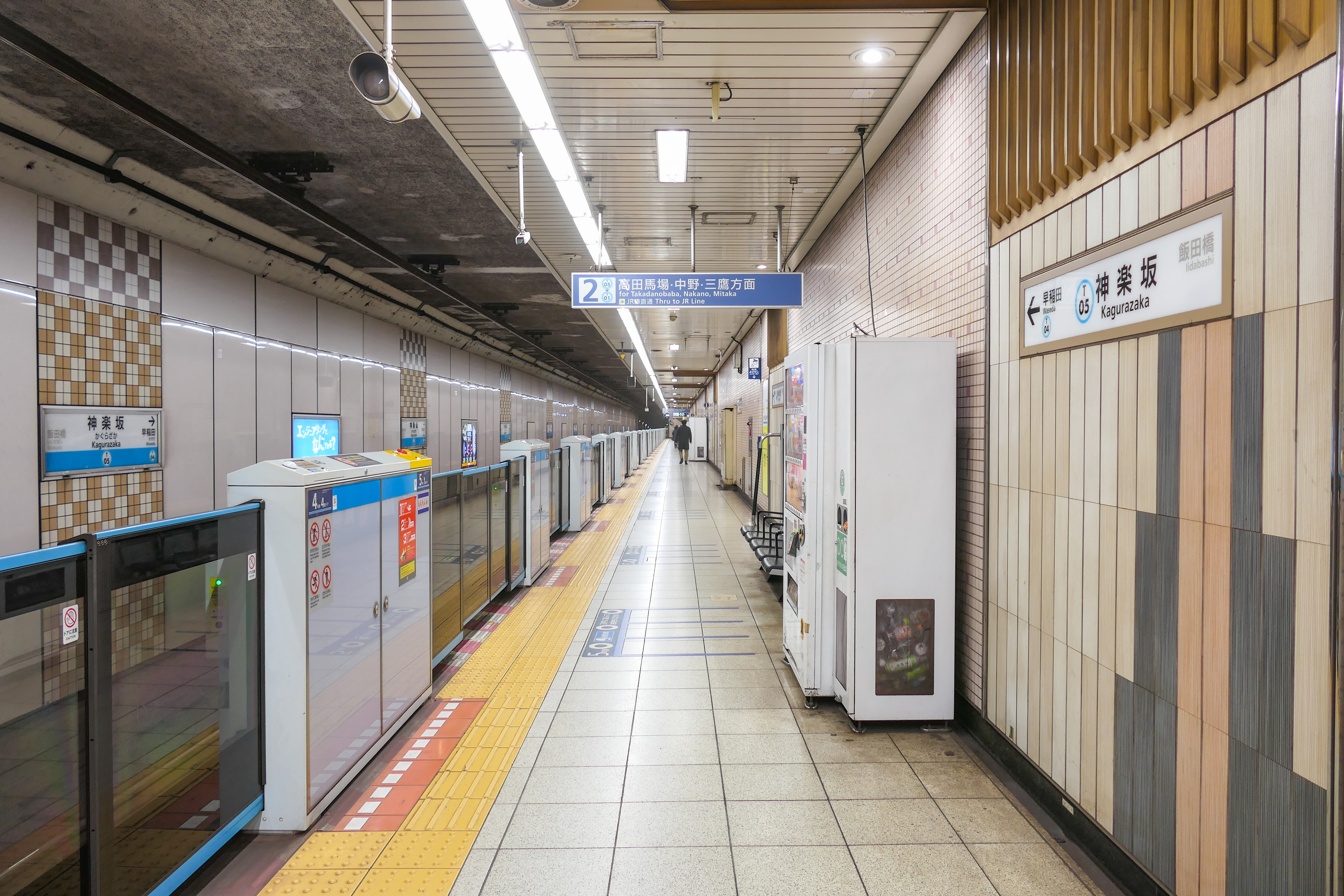
- Nakano-bound platform, 2022

Japanese name
- Shinjitai: 神楽坂駅
- Kyūjitai: 神樂阪驛
- Hiragana: かぐらざかえき

General information
- Location: 112 Yaraichō, Shinjuku City, Tokyo; Japan
- Operator: Tokyo Metro
- Line: Tōzai Line
- Platforms: 2 split-level side platforms
- Tracks: 2

Construction
- Structure type: Underground

Other information
- Station code: T-05

History
- Opened: 23 December 1964; 61 years ago

Services
Preceding station	Tokyo Metro	Following station
Waseda towards Nakano	Tōzai Line Rapid Commuter Rapid Local	Iidabashi towards Nishi-Funabashi
Location
- Location within Tokyo Yamanote Loop Location within Tokyo wards area Location within Japan

Kagurazaka Station (神楽坂駅, Kagurazaka-eki) is a subway station in Shinjuku, Tokyo, Japan. Its station number is T-05. The station exit faces Waseda Dōri, uphill from the Kagurazaka intersection and nearby Akagi Shrine.

== Line ==
- Tokyo Metro - Tōzai Line

== Station layout ==
Kagurazaka Station is composed of two side platforms on split levels. Platform 1 is on the 3rd basement floor, whereas Platform 2 is on the 2nd basement floor.

=== Platforms ===
1	Tōzai Line	for Ōtemachi, Tōyōchō, and Nishi-Funabashi; Chuo-Sobu Line for Tsudanuma; Toyo Rapid Railway Line for Tōyō-Katsutadai
2	Tōzai Line	for Nakano; Chuo-Sobu Line for Mitaka

== History ==
Kagurazaka Station was opened on 23 December 1964, on the first stage of the Tokyo Metro Tozai Line between Takadanobaba and Kudanshita by the Teito Rapid Transit Authority (TRTA).

The station facilities were inherited by Tokyo Metro after the privatization of the Teito Rapid Transit Authority (TRTA) in 2004.
