= Shinjuku-nishiguchi Station =

Metro station in Tokyo, Japan

Coordinates: 35.6934°N 139.6990°E

Shinjuku-nishiguchi Station 新宿西口駅

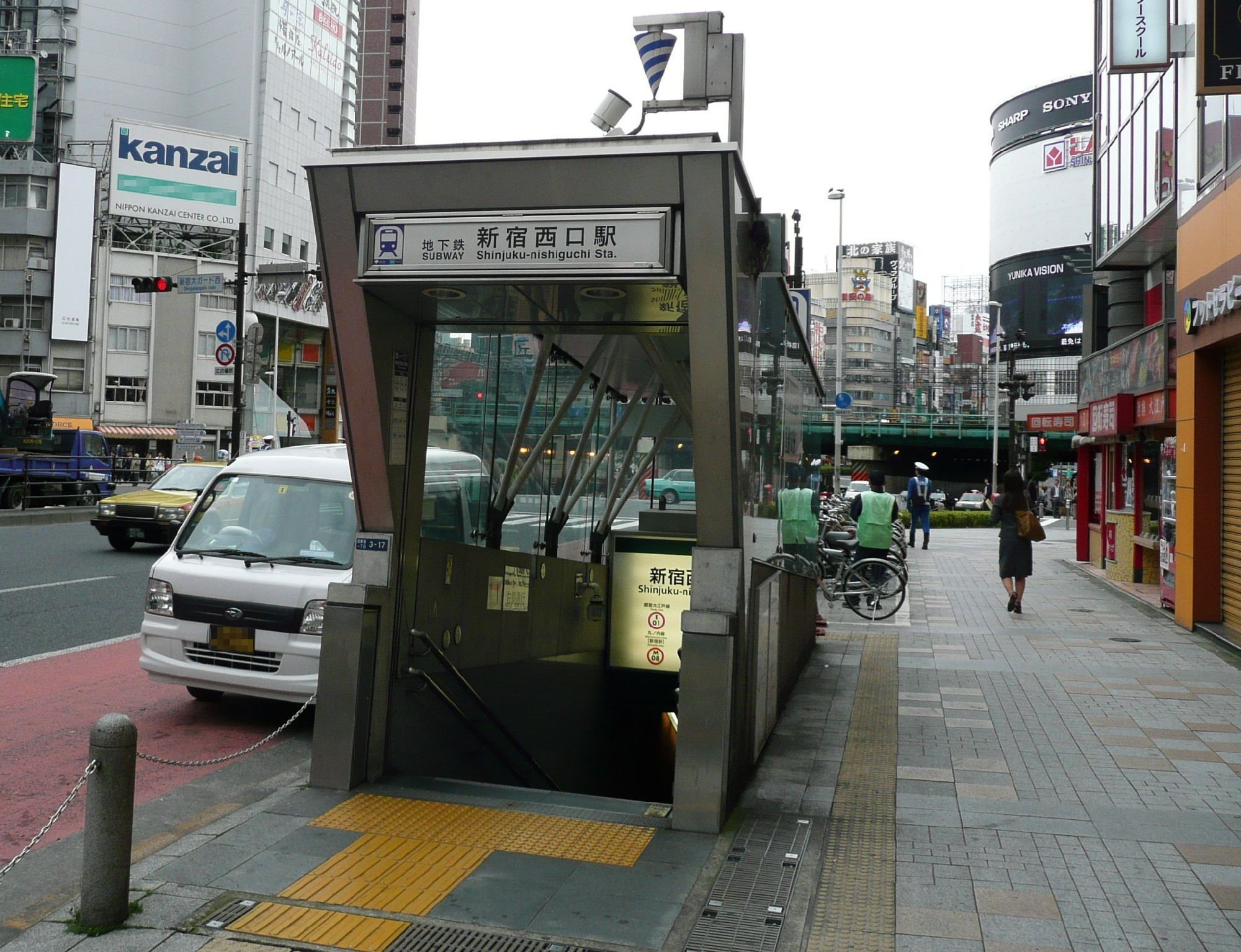
- Entrance D4, May 2010

General information
- Location: 1-3-17 Nishi-shinjuku, Shinjuku City, Tokyo; Japan
- Operator: Toei Subway
- Line: Ōedo Line
- Platforms: 1 island platform
- Tracks: 2
- Connections: Shinjuku; SS01 Seibu-Shinjuku; Bus stop

Construction
- Structure type: Underground

Other information
- Station code: E-01

History
- Opened: 12 December 2000; 25 years ago

Passengers
- FY2011: 51,059 daily

Services
Preceding station	Toei Subway	Following station
Tochōmae Terminus	Ōedo Line	Higashi-shinjuku towards Hikarigaoka
Location
- Location within Tokyo Yamanote Loop Location within Tokyo wards area Location within Japan

Shinjuku-nishiguchi Station (新宿西口駅, Shinjuku-Nishiguchi-eki) is a subway station on the Toei Oedo Line in Tokyo, Japan, operated by the Tokyo subway operator Toei Subway.

== Lines ==
Shinjuku-nishiguchi Station is served by the Toei Oedo Line, and is numbered "E-01".

== Station layout ==
The station has one island platform, serving two tracks, located on the 4th basement ("B4F") level. There are two major exits in this station. The north ticket gate leads to various exit points to Oogado Crossing. The south gate leads to the Odakyu Department store area and the Marunouchi Line.

=== Platforms ===
1	Ōedo Line	for Tochōmae (Transfer at Tochōmae for Nerima, Hikarigaoka, and Roppongi)
2	Ōedo Line	for Iidabashi and Ryōgoku

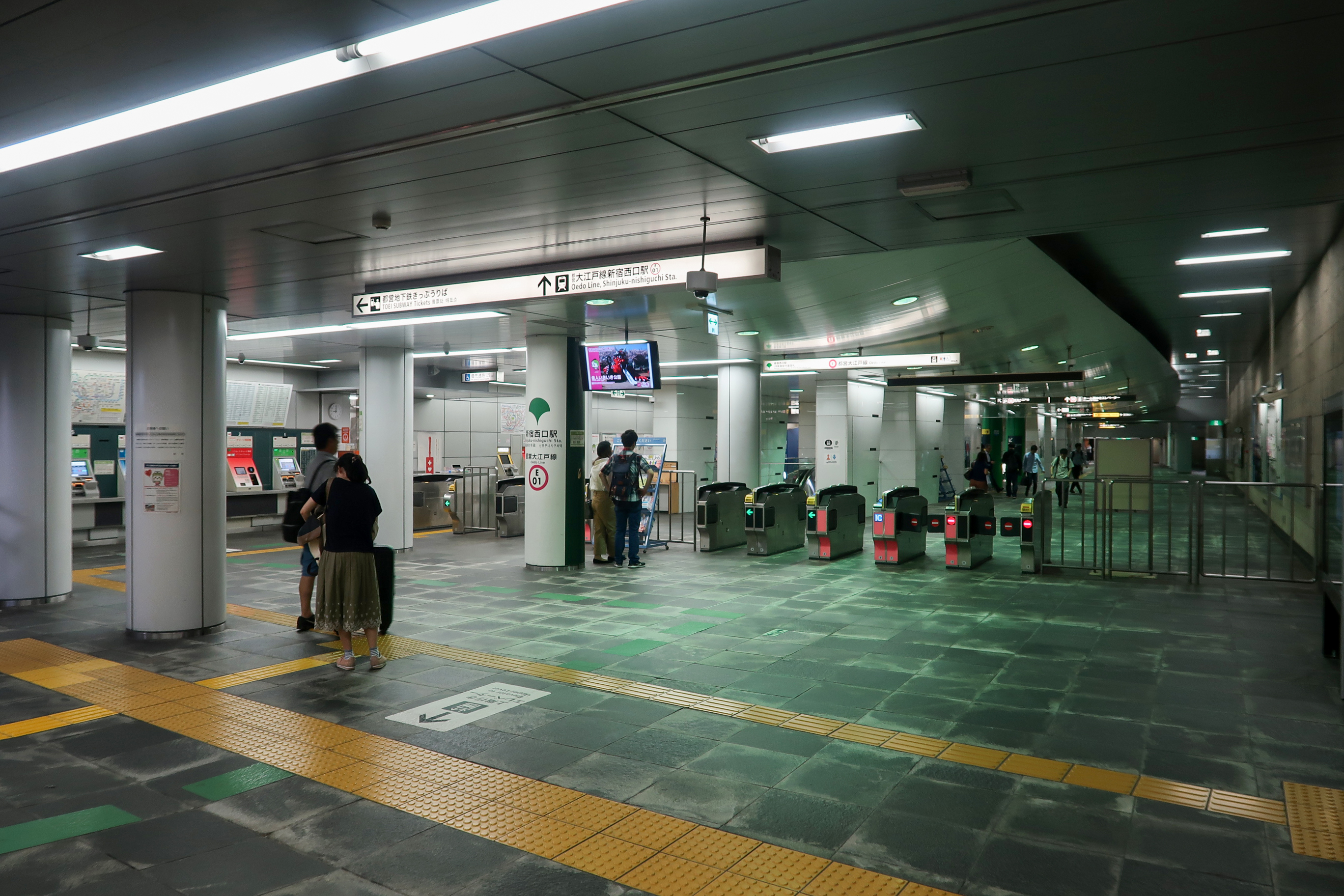
Concourse

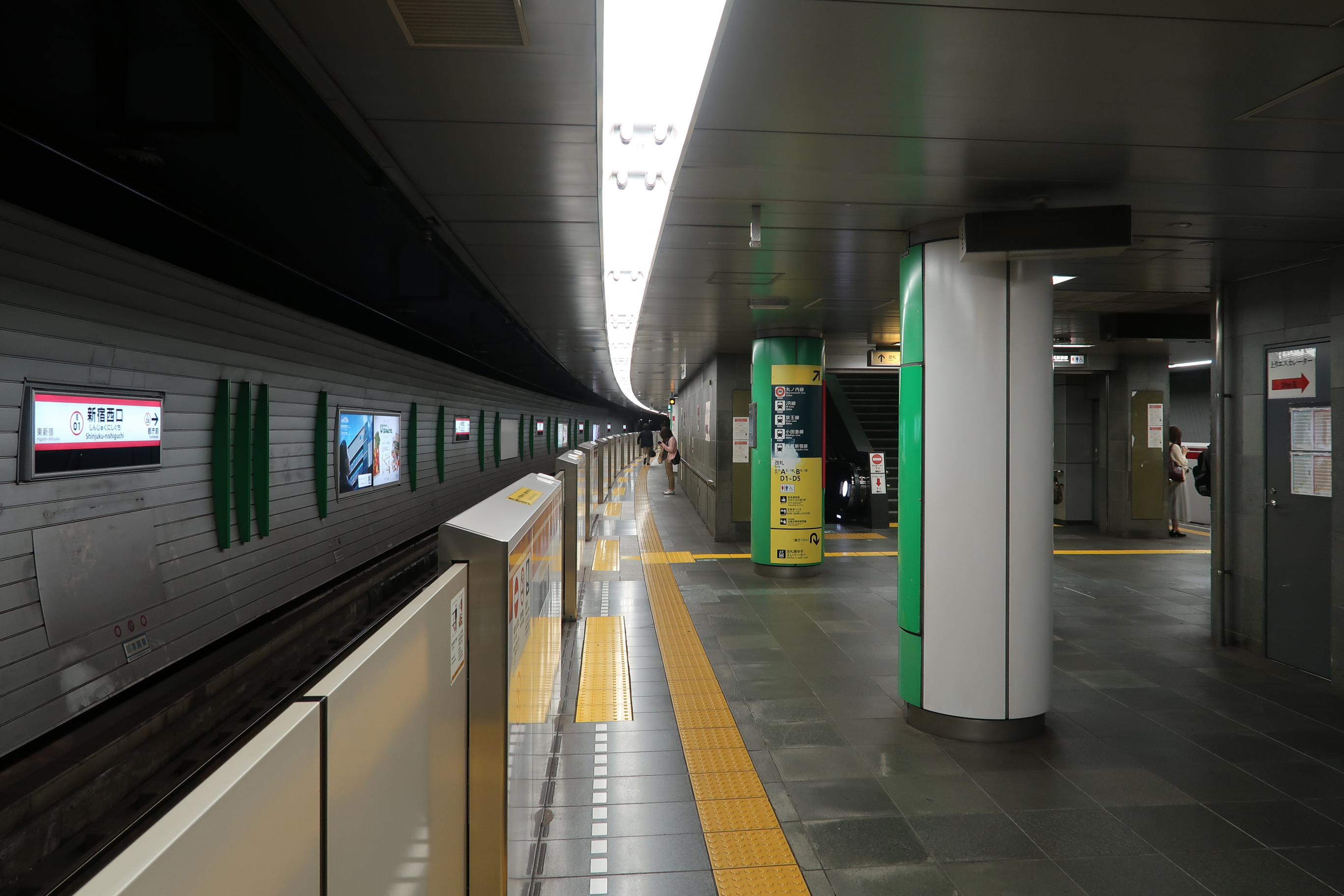
Platform

== History ==
Shinjuku-nishiguchi Station opened on 12 December 2000.

== Passenger statistics ==
In fiscal 2011, the station was used by an average of 51,059 passengers daily.

== Surrounding area ==
Shinjuku-nishiguchi Station is essentially a satellite station located to the north-west of the main Shinjuku Station interchange. The name "Nishiguchi" means "West Exit" which is where this station's exits are located, relative to Shinjuku Station. While this station is close to the Oedo Line Shinjuku station, it is closer to the Tokyo Metro Marunouchi Line, the Seibu Shinjuku Line, and Shinjuku bus terminal.

- Shinjuku Station
- Seibu Shinjuku Station

== See also ==
- List of railway stations in Japan
