= Iidabashi Station =

Railway and metro station in Tokyo, Japan

Coordinates: 35°42′07″N 139°44′42″E

JB16 Iidabashi Station 飯田橋駅

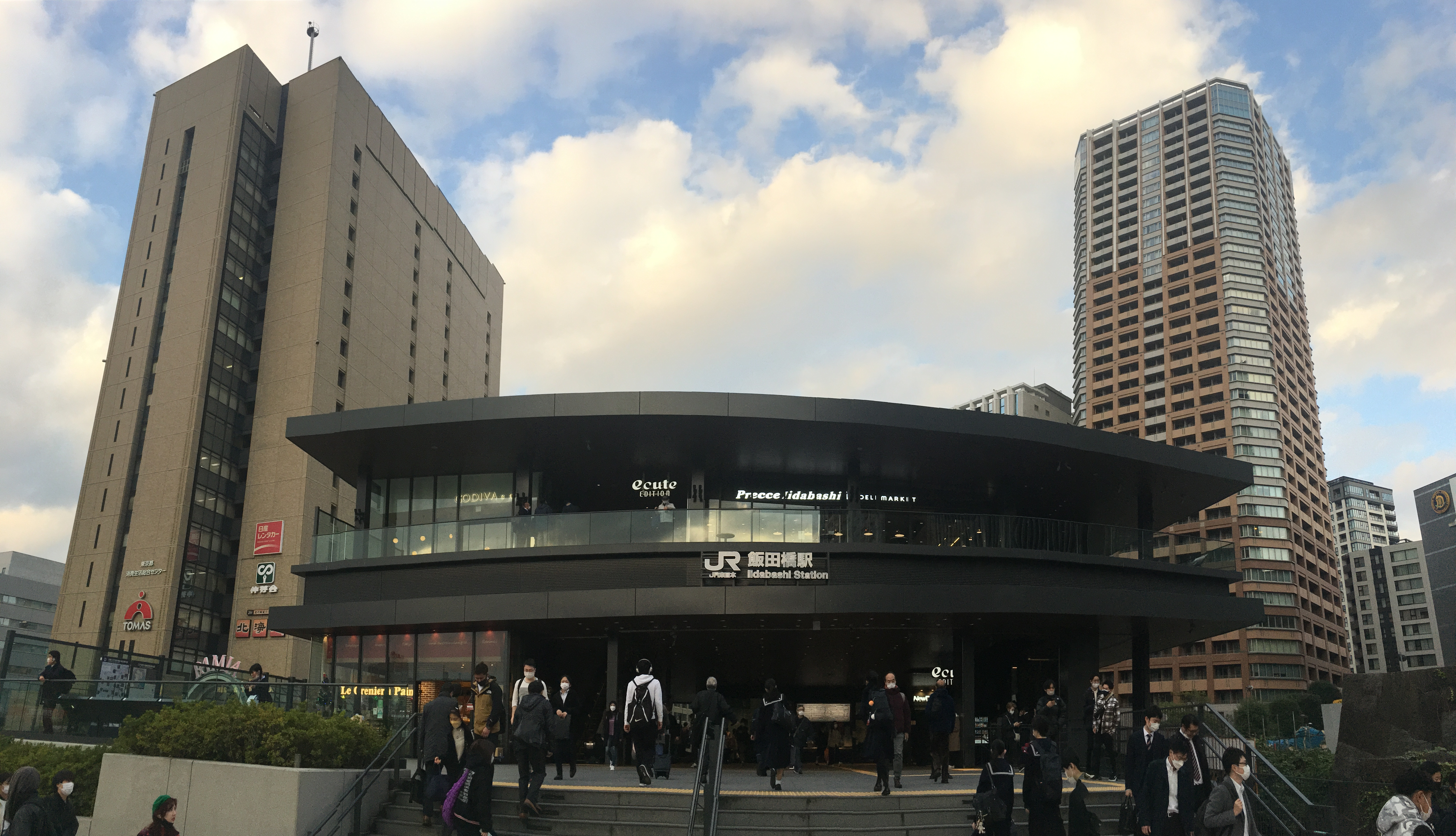
- JR East west entrance, November 2022

General information
- Location: Chiyoda, Tokyo; Japan
- Operator: JR East; Tokyo Metro; Toei Subway
- Lines: Chūō-Sōbu Line; Tōzai Line; Yūrakuchō Line; Namboku Line; Ōedo Line

Construction
- Structure type: At grade (JR East); Underground (Toei and Tokyo Metro)
- Platform levels: 4
- Accessible: Yes

Other information
- Station code: JB16 (Chūō-Sōbu Line); T-06 (Tozai Line); Y-13 (Yurakucho Line); N-10 (Namboku Line); E-06 (Toei Oedo Line)
- Website: Official website

History
- Opened: 15 November 1928; 97 years ago

Services
Preceding station	JR East	Following station
Ichigaya JB15 towards Mitaka	Chūō–Sōbu Line	Suidōbashi JB17 towards Chiba
Preceding station	Tokyo Metro	Following station
Kagurazaka towards Nakano	Tōzai Line Rapid Commuter Rapid Local	Kudanshita towards Nishi-Funabashi
Shakujii-kōen SI10 towards Kotesashi	S-Train (weekdays)	Yurakucho towards Toyosu
Edogawabashi towards Wakoshi	Yūrakuchō Line	Ichigaya towards Shin-kiba
Ichigaya towards Meguro	Namboku Line	Korakuen towards Akabane-iwabuchi
Preceding station	Toei Subway	Following station
Ushigome-kagurazaka towards Tochōmae	Ōedo Line	Kasuga towards Hikarigaoka
Location
- Location within Tokyo Yamanote Loop Location within Tokyo wards area Location within Japan

Iidabashi Station (飯田橋駅, Iidabashi-eki) is a major interchange railway station which straddles Tokyo's Chiyoda, Shinjuku and Bunkyō wards. It was originally built as Iidamachi Station (albeit in a slightly different location), terminus of the then Kōbu Railway, precursor to today's Chūō Line. The Ōedo Line addition to the station in 2000 was designed by architect Makoto Sei Watanabe.

== Lines ==
Iidabashi Station is served by the following above-ground and subway lines.

=== Above ground ===
- Chūō-Sōbu Line (JB16)

=== Subway lines ===
- Tokyo Metro Tōzai Line (T-06)
- Tokyo Metro Yūrakuchō Line (Y-13)
- Tokyo Metro Namboku Line (N-10)
- Toei Ōedo Line (E-06)

== Station layout ==
The JR East station has one island platform, serving the up and down local lines; there is no platform for the parallel rapid double track (for longer-distance commuter and express Chūō Line trains). The station is located on the inside of the Outer Moat. It is elevated over Mejiro-dori, a major thoroughfare from the Imperial Palace towards Ikebukuro.

=== JR East ===
1	Chūō-Sōbu Line	for Ochanomizu, Akihabara, and Chiba
2	Chūō-Sōbu Line	for Yotsuya, Shinjuku, Nakano, and Mitaka

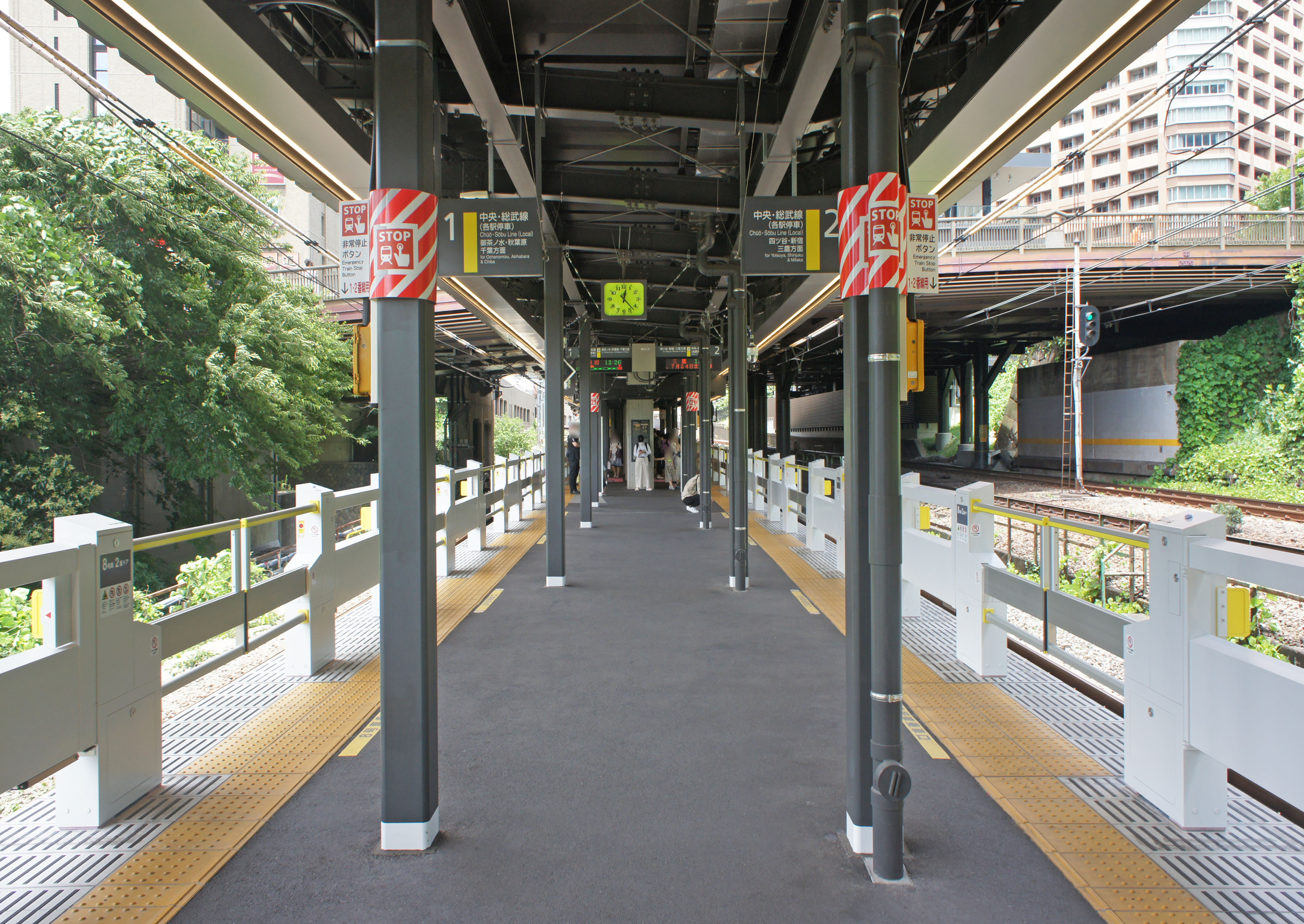
Chuo-Sobu Line platforms, 2022. The bypass tracks on the right are for rapid trains.

=== Tokyo Metro ===
1
Tōzai Line
for Ōtemachi, Nishi-Funabashi
Toyo Rapid Railway Line for Tōyō-Katsutadai
Chuo-Sobu Line for Tsudanuma
2
for Takadanobaba, Nakano
Chuo-Sobu Line for Mitaka
3
Yūrakuchō Line
for Nagatachō, Yūrakuchō, Toyosu, and Shin-Kiba
4
for Ikebukuro
Seibu Ikebukuro Line for Hannō
Tobu Tojo Line for Shinrinkoen
5
Namboku Line
for Komagome, Akabane-Iwabuchi
Saitama Rapid Railway Line to Urawa-Misono
6
- for Shirokane-takanawa and Meguro
- Meguro Line for Hiyoshi
- Tokyu Shin-Yokohama Line for Shin-Yokohama Station
- Sotetsu Main Line for Ebina via the Tokyu/Sotetsu Shin-Yokohama Line

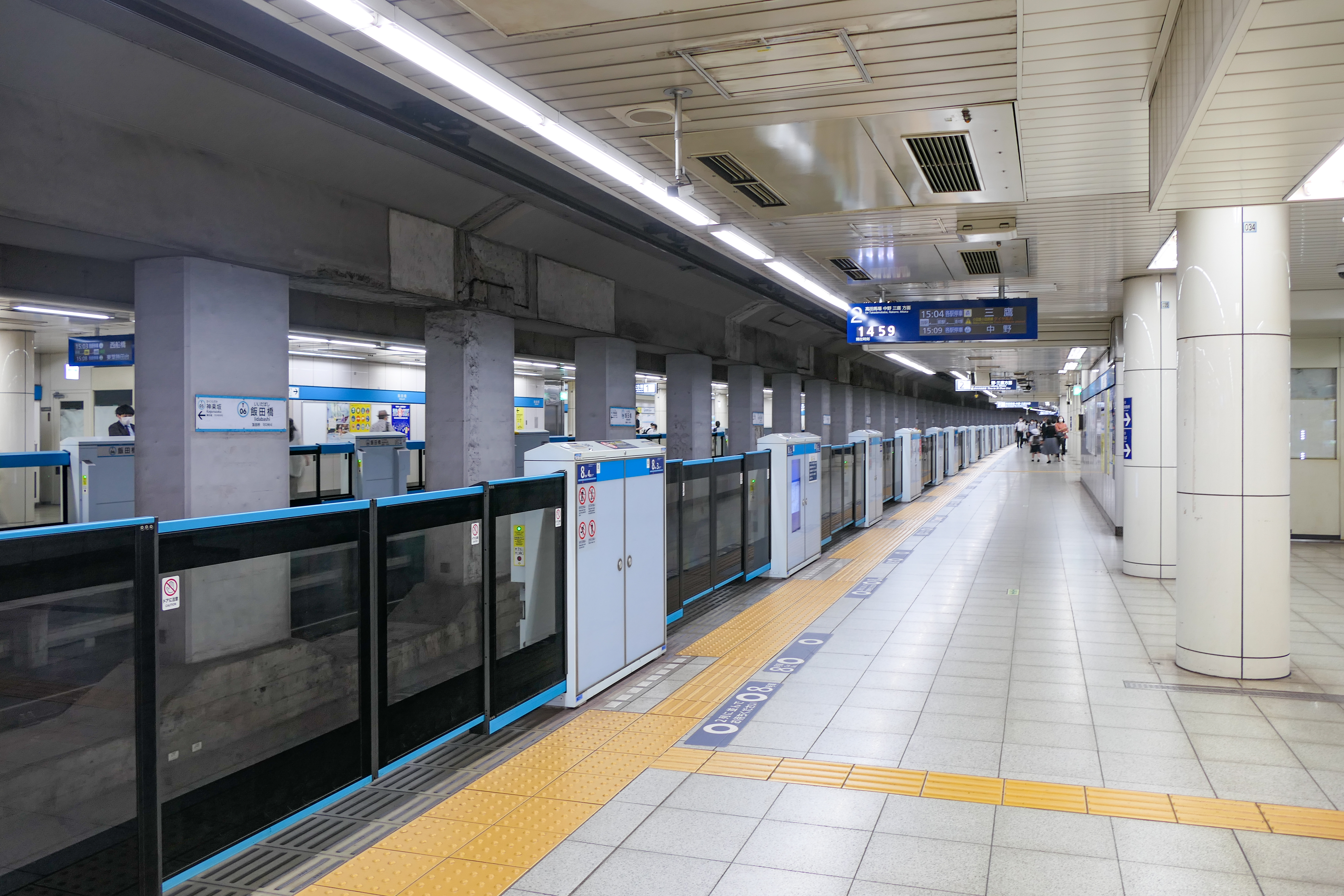
Tozai Line platforms, 2022

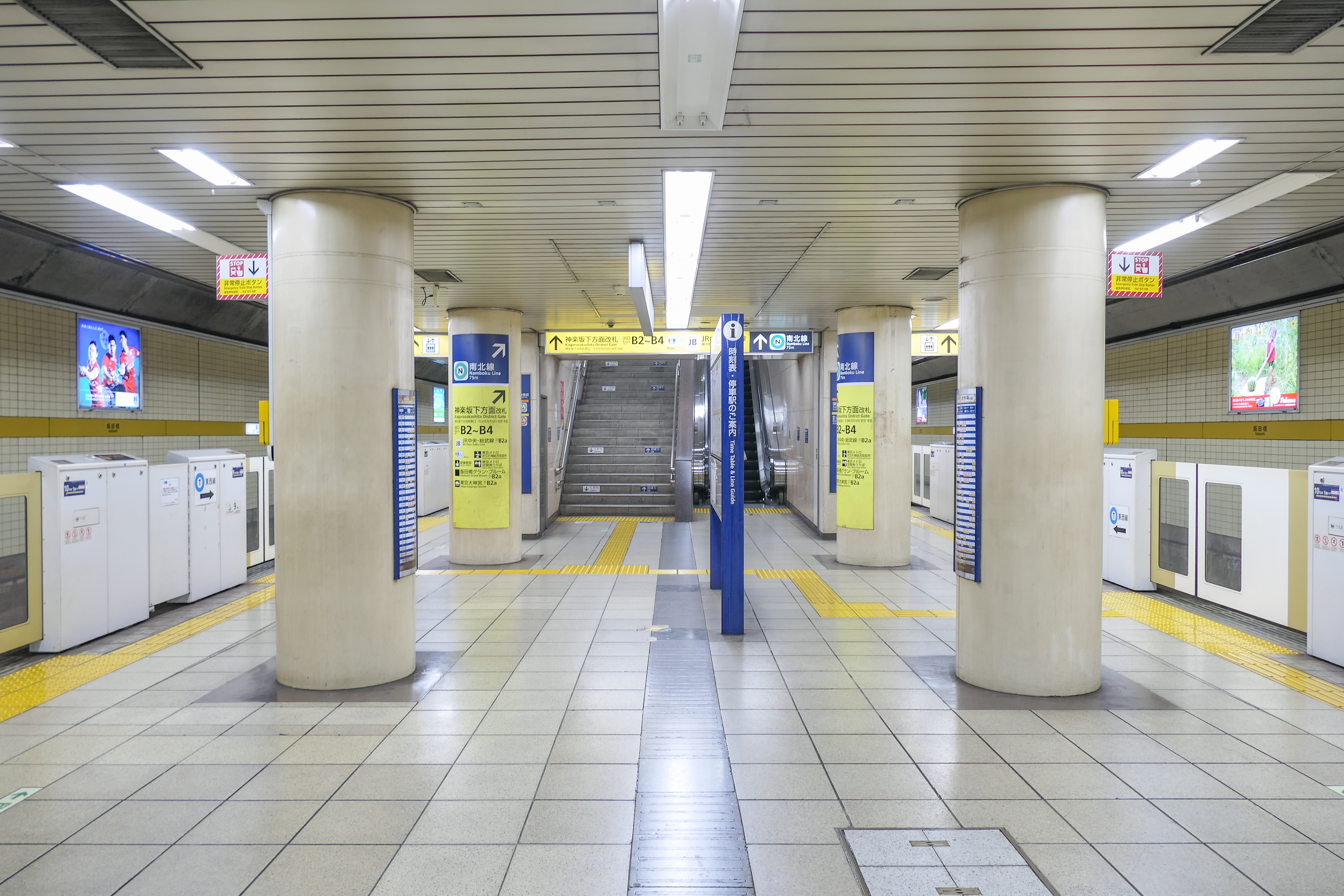
Yurakucho Line platforms, 2022

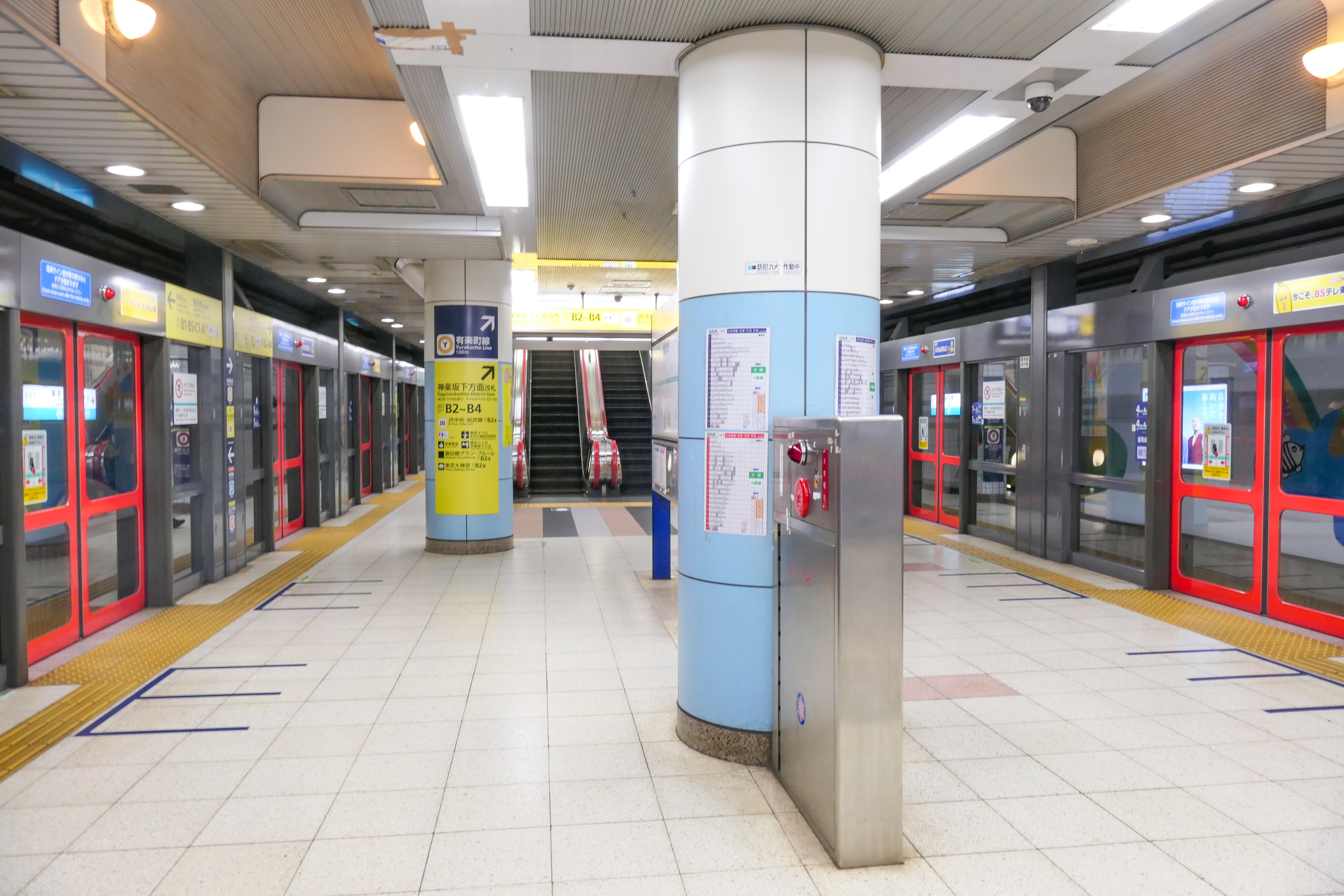
Namboku Line platforms, 2022

=== Toei ===
1	Ōedo Line	for Tochōmae
2	Ōedo Line	for Ryōgoku and Daimon

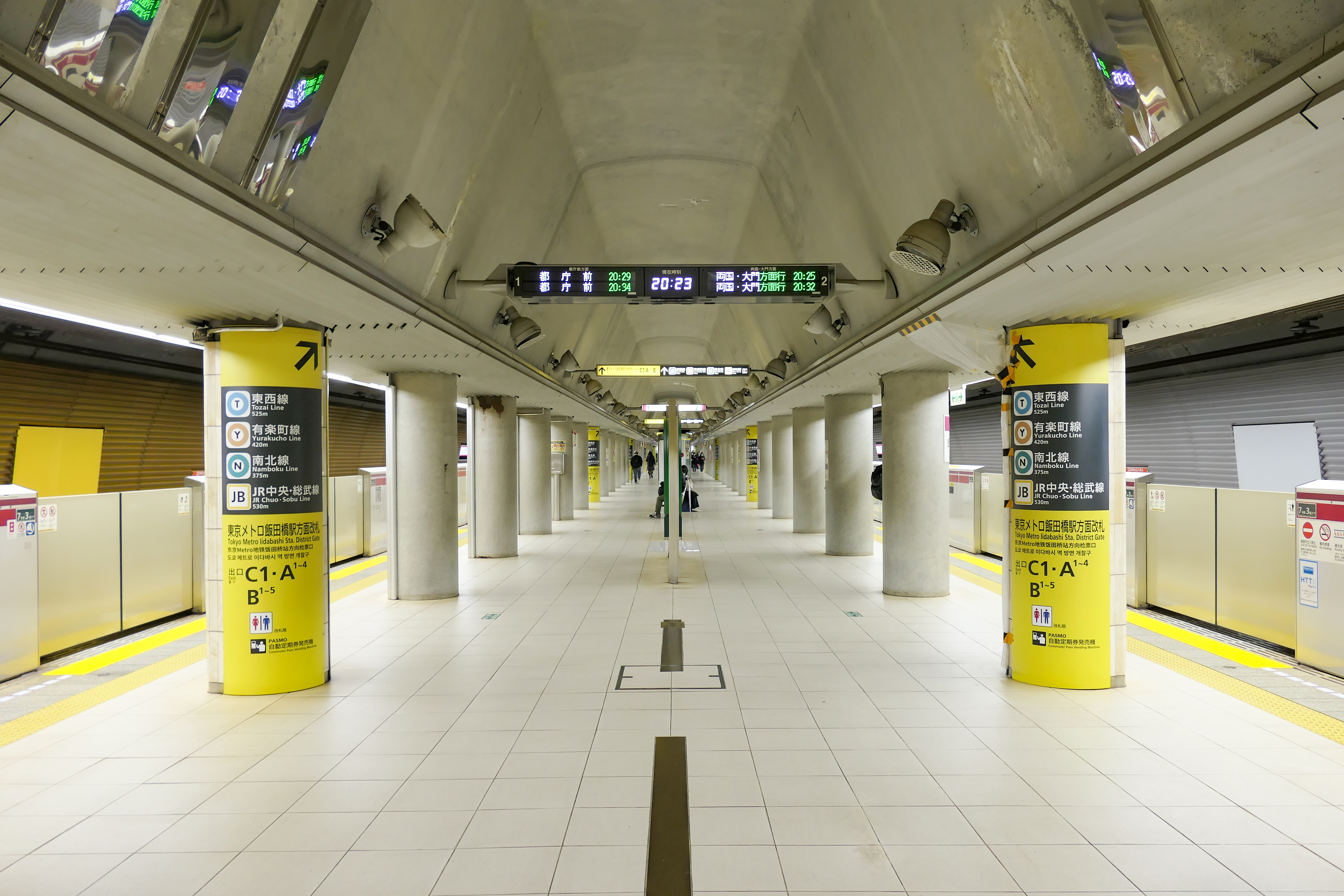
Oedo Line platforms, 2022

== History ==
The present-day JR East station opened on 15 November 1928.

The station facilities of the Tozai, Namboku and Yurakucho Lines were inherited by Tokyo Metro after the privatization of the Teito Rapid Transit Authority (TRTA) in 2004.

In 2014, it was announced that the JR East platforms were to be moved and rebuilt approximately 200 m southwest to reduce platform gaps on a sharply curved section of the platform. The new platforms, along with a new west station building, opened on July 12, 2020. In 2022, a large-scale renovation and redevelopment of the station and its environs was launched. With completion scheduled for 2026, the "Iidabashi Station East Area Redevelopment Project" will add a 24-floor mixed-use building to the station complex, containing residential, commercial, and shopping space as well as restaurants.

== Passenger statistics ==
In fiscal 2013, the JR East station was used by an average of 91,196 passengers daily (boarding passengers only), making it the 46th-busiest JR East station. Over the same fiscal year, the Tokyo Metro station was used by an average of 173,224 passengers daily (exiting and entering passengers), making it the twelfth-busiest station operated by Tokyo Metro. In fiscal 2013, the Toei station was used by an average of 14,577 passengers daily (boarding passengers only). The average daily passenger figures for JR East and Tokyo Metro in previous years are as shown below.

Fiscal year	JR East	Tokyo Metro
2000	91,145	
2005	88,647	
2010	90,363	
2011	90,763	166,452
2012	91,359	169,830
2013	91,196	173,224

- Note that JR East figures are for boarding passengers only.

The Number of Passengers on Iidabashi as recorded by the East Japan Railway Company Trains in 2017-2022 was 20,197 (（単位 千人）).

== Surrounding area ==
Koishikawa Kōrakuen Garden can be reached by walking from this station. The Iidabashi district extends south and west of the station, and the Kagurazaka extends north and east. The station spans the Kanda River, which separates these two neighborhoods and at this point runs from the southwest towards the northeast.

== See also ==
- List of railway stations in Japan
