= Toei 12-000 and 12-600 series =

There are two electric multiple unit (EMU) train types operated by the Tokyo subway operator Tokyo Metropolitan Bureau of Transportation (Toei) on the Toei Oedo Line in Tokyo, Japan:

- Toei 12-000 series
- Toei 12-600 series
