= Kiyosumi-shirakawa Station =

Metro station in Tokyo, Japan

Coordinates: 35.6823°N 139.7987°E

Kiyosumi-shirakawa Station 清澄白河駅

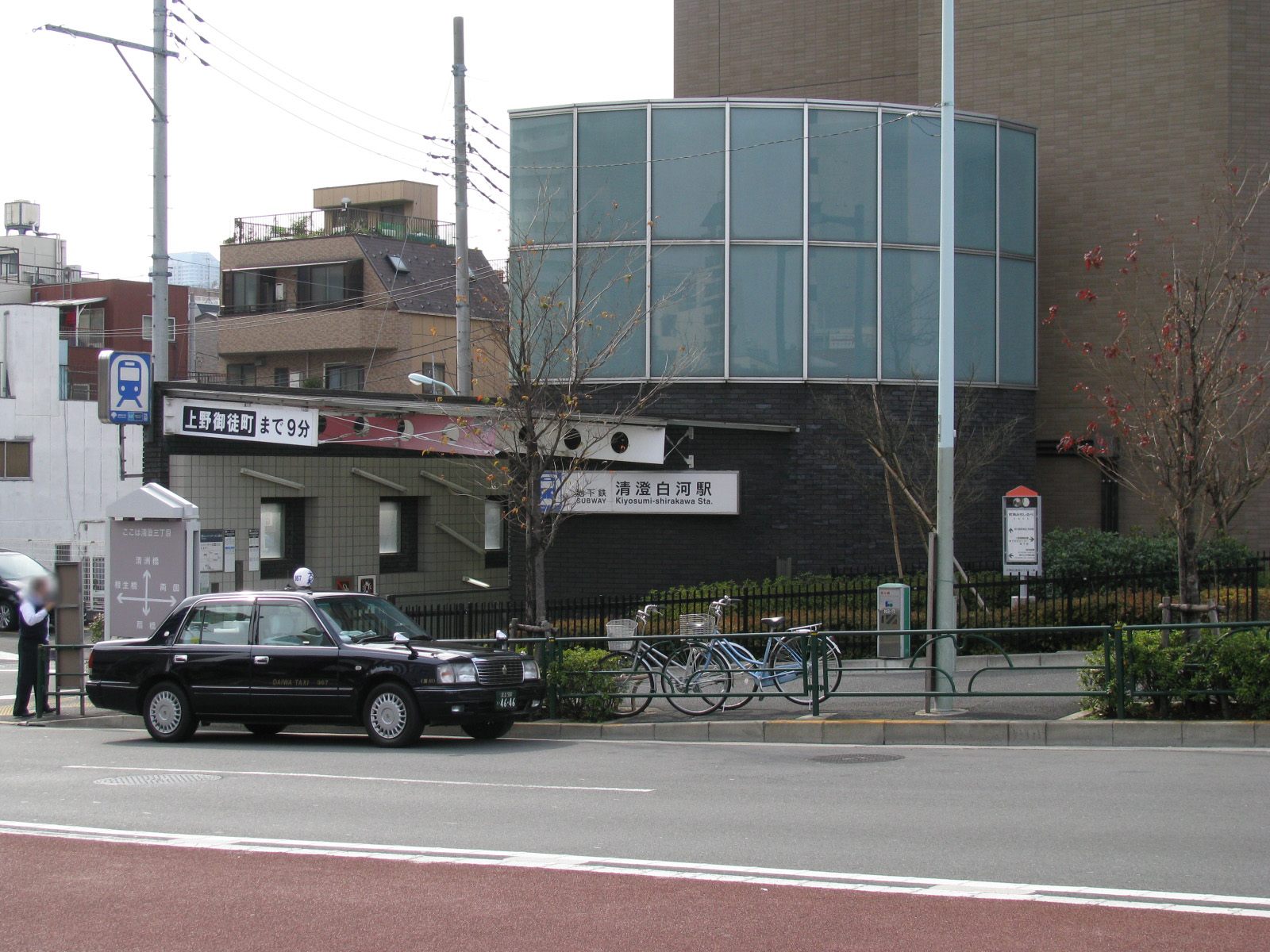
- Station entrance

General information
- Location: 1-6-13 Shirakawa (Hanzōmon Line); 7-14 Shirakawa 1-chome (Ōedo Line); Kōtō, Tokyo; Japan
- Operator: Tokyo Metro; Toei Subway
- Lines: Hanzōmon Line; Ōedo Line
- Platforms: 1 island platform (Hanzōmon Line); 2 island platforms (Ōedo Line)
- Tracks: 2 (Hanzōmon Line), 3 (Ōedo Line)

Construction
- Structure type: Underground

Other information
- Station code: E-14 (Ōedo Line); Z-11 (Hanzōmon Line)

History
- Opened: 12 December 2000; 25 years ago

Services
Preceding station	Tokyo Metro	Following station
Suitengūmae towards Shibuya	Hanzōmon Line	Sumiyoshi towards Oshiage
Preceding station	Toei Subway	Following station
Morishita towards Tochōmae	Ōedo Line	Monzen-nakachō towards Hikarigaoka
Location
- Location within Special wards of Tokyo Location within Tokyo Bay and Bōsō Peninsula Location within Tokyo Location within Japan

Kiyosumi-shirakawa Station (清澄白河駅, Kiyosumi-shirakawa-eki) is a subway station on the Tokyo Metro Hanzōmon Line and the Toei Ōedo Line in Koto, Tokyo, Japan, jointly operated by the two Tokyo subway operators Tokyo Metro and Toei Subway.

Some trains on both lines terminate and originate at this station.

== Station layout ==
=== Toei platforms ===
The Toei section of the station is composed of two island platforms serving three tracks.

1/2	Ōedo Line	for Ryōgoku, Iidabashi, and Tochōmae
3/4	Ōedo Line	for Daimon and Roppongi

Platforms 2 and 3 serve the same track, with some trains terminating and starting at this platform.

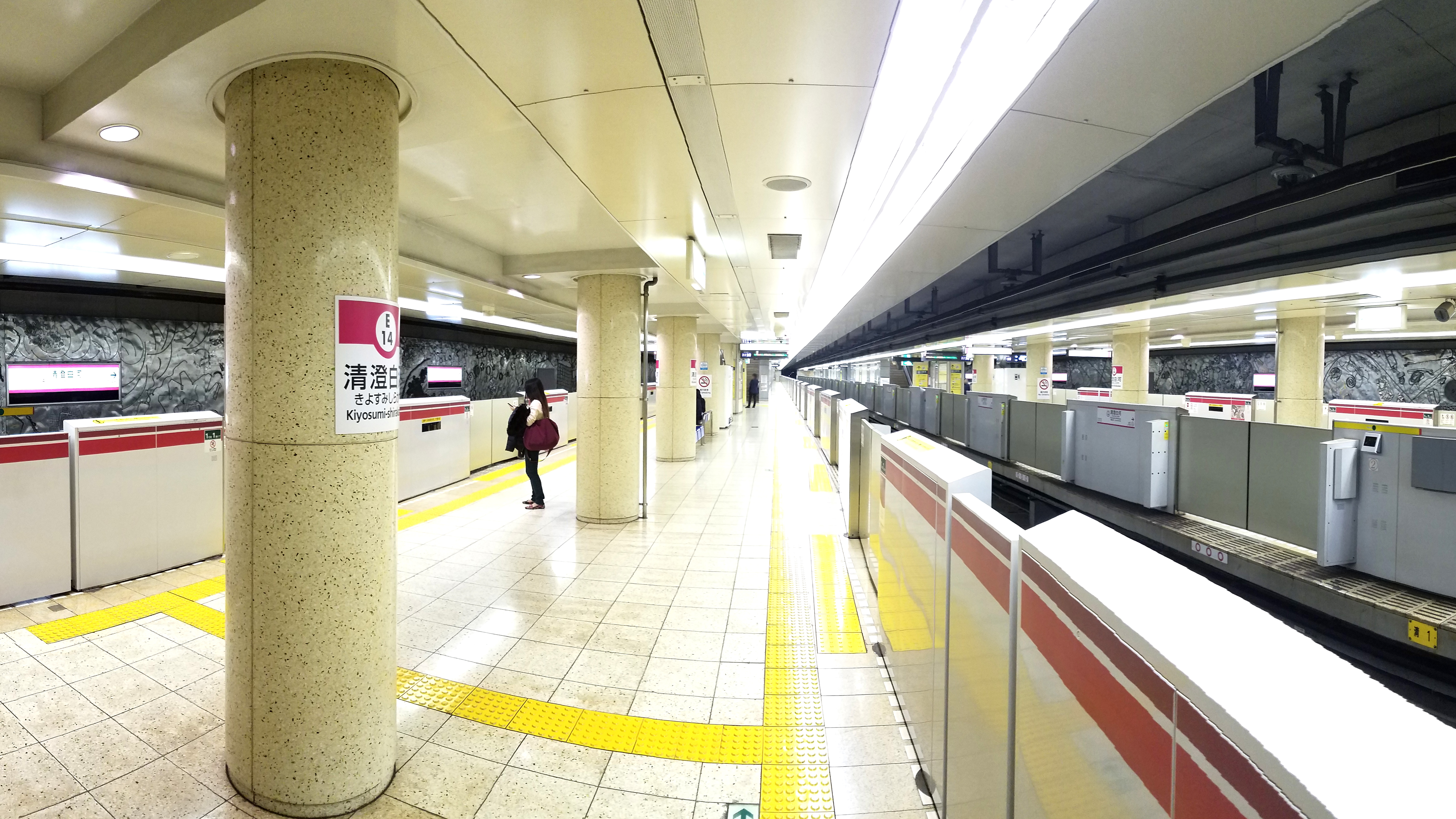
Oedo Line platforms

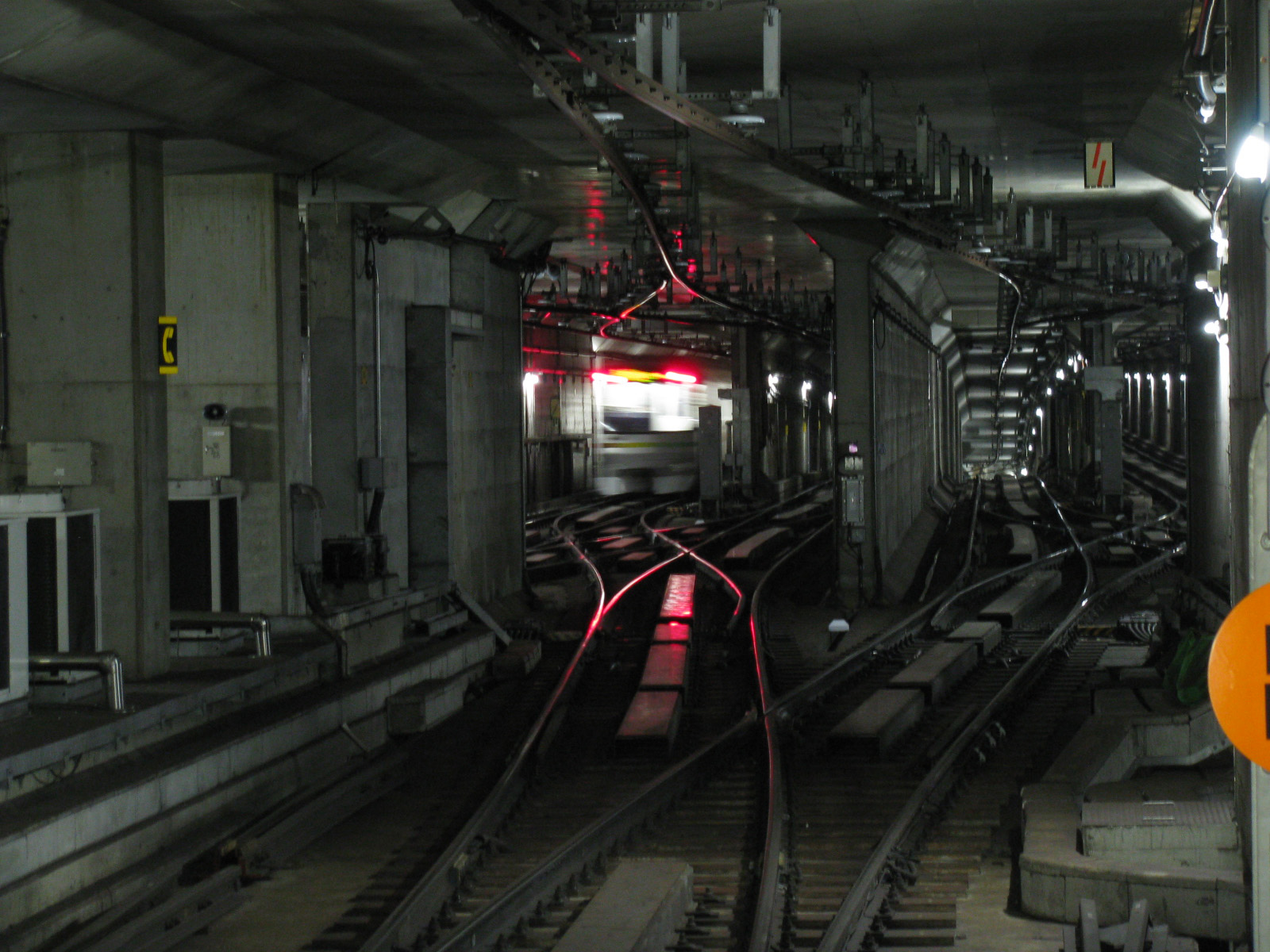
Oedo Line middle track turnout and crossovers outside Kiyosumi-shirakawa station, 2008

=== Tokyo Metro platforms ===
The Tokyo Metro section of the station is a single island platform serving two tracks.

1	Hanzōmon Line	for Ōtemachi and Shibuya; Den-en-toshi Line for Chūō-Rinkan
2	Hanzōmon Line	for Kinshichō and Oshiage; Tobu Skytree Line for Tōbu-Dōbutsu-Kōen; Tobu Isesaki Line for Kuki; Tōbu Nikkō Line for Minami-Kurihashi

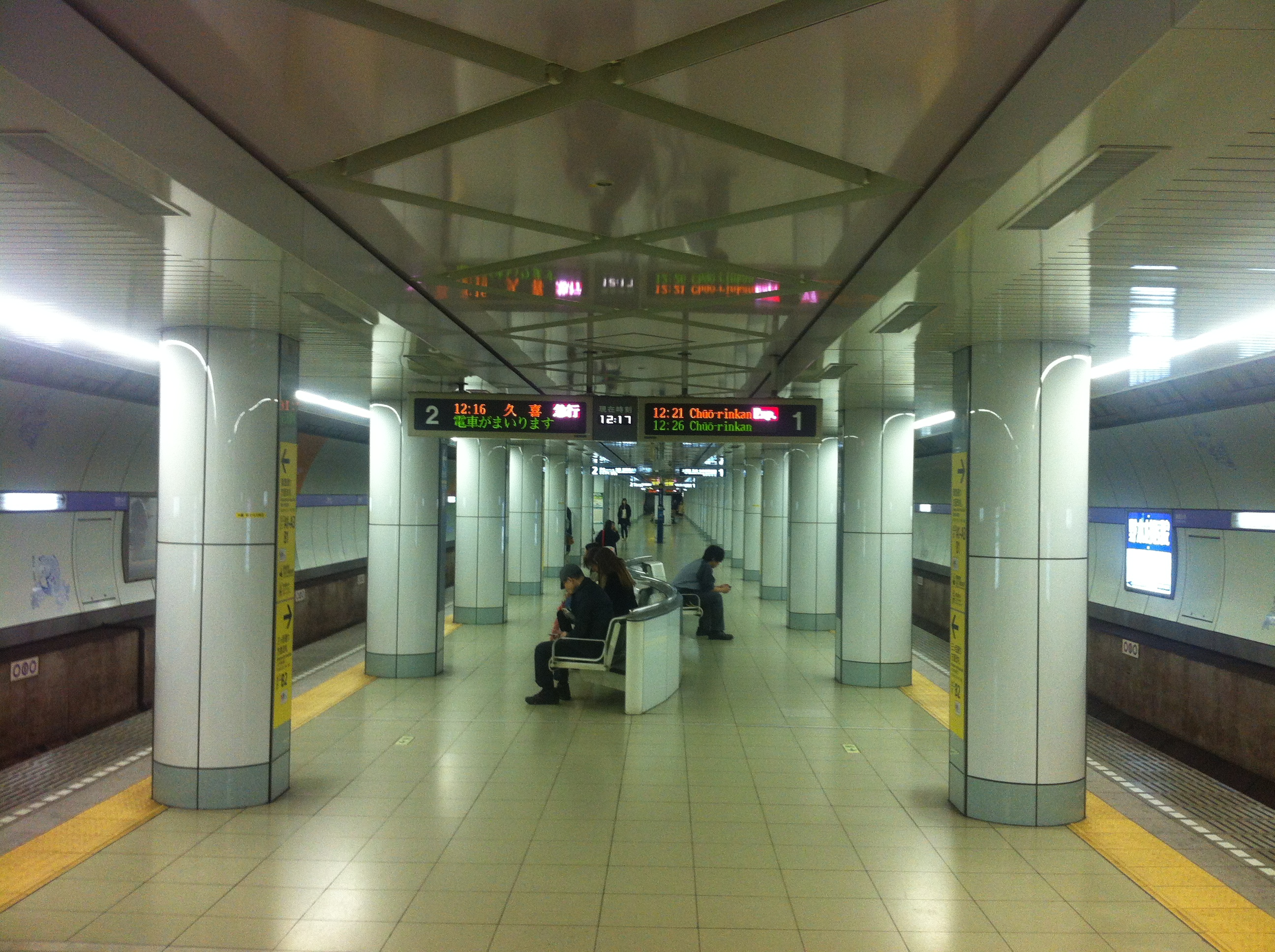
Hanzomon Line platforms

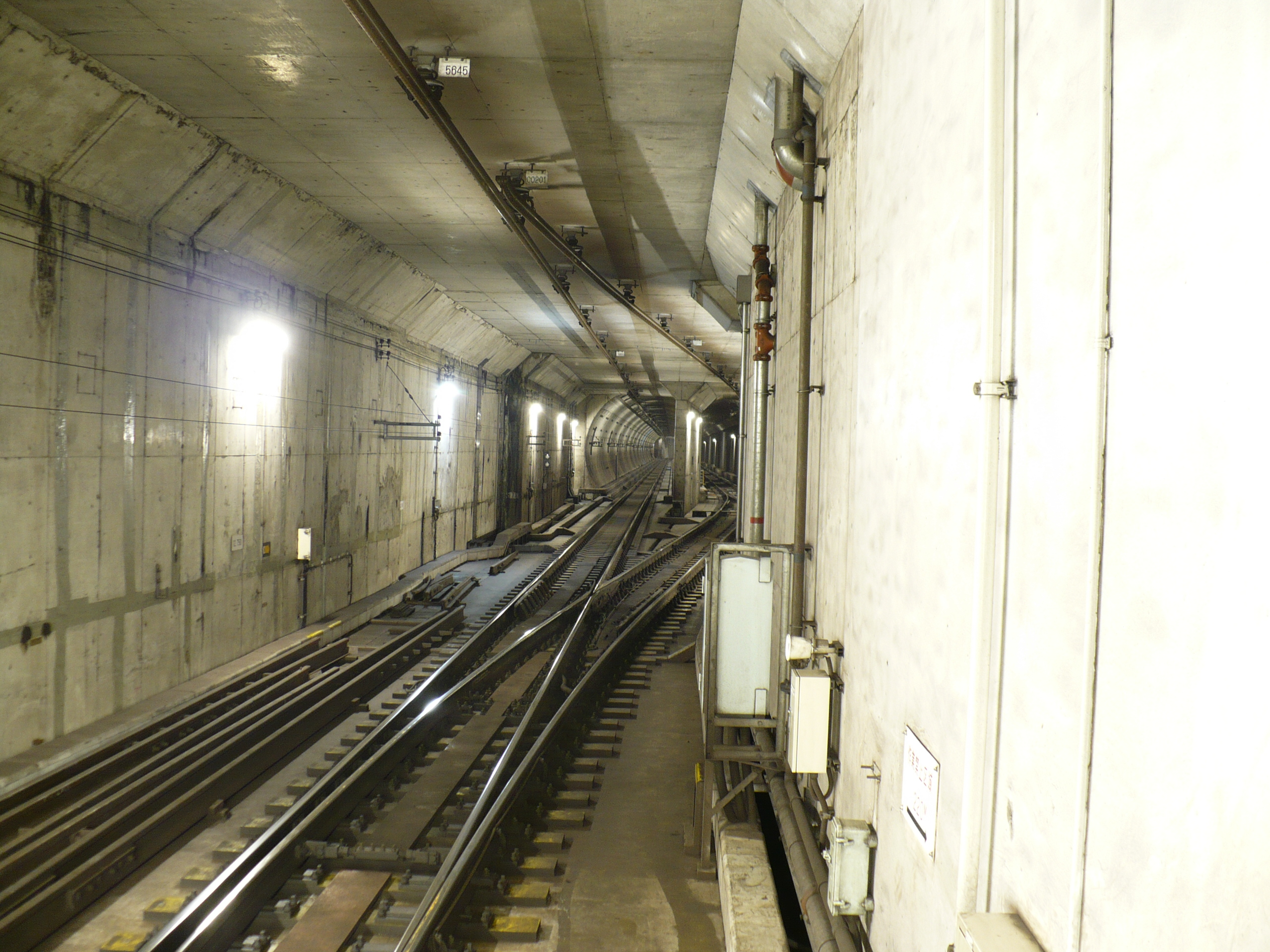
Hanzomon Line track crossover outside Kiyosumi-shirakawa station, 2009

== History ==
The Toei Ōedo Line station opened on 12 December 2000. The Hanzōmon Line station opened on 19 March 2003.

The station facilities of the Hanzōmon Line were inherited by Tokyo Metro after the privatization of the Teito Rapid Transit Authority (TRTA) in 2004.

== Passenger statistics ==
In fiscal 2013, the Tokyo Metro station was the least used on the Hanzōmon line and the 78th-busiest on the Tokyo Metro network as a whole with an average of 47,192 passengers daily. The least used station by far is Nishigahara station on the Namboku line. Over the same fiscal year, the Toei station was used by an average of 17,430 passengers daily (boarding passengers only). The passenger statistics for the Tokyo Metro station in previous years are as shown below.

Fiscal year	Daily average
2011	41,938
2012	45,263
2013	47,192

== Surrounding area ==
Landmarks in the surrounding area include:

- Kiyosumi Garden
- Museum of Contemporary Art Tokyo (MOT)
