= Ochiai-minami-nagasaki Station =

Metro station in Tokyo, Japan

Coordinates: 35.723469°N 139.683437°E

Ochiai-minami-nagasaki Station 落合南長崎駅

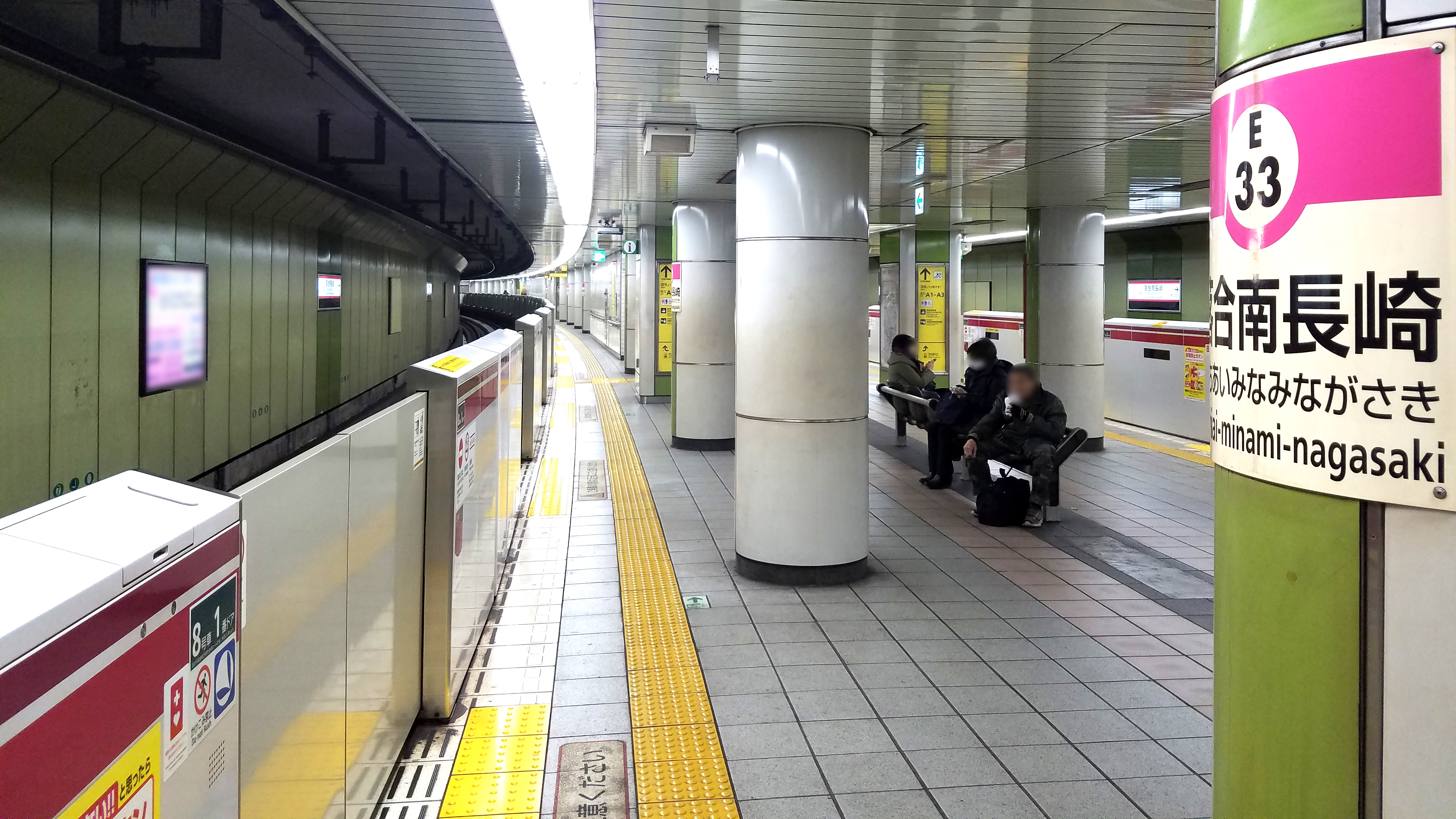
- Platforms, 2019

General information
- Location: 3-1-18 Nishiochiai, Shinjuku City, Tokyo; Japan
- Operator: Toei Subway
- Line: Ōedo Line
- Platforms: 1 island platform
- Tracks: 2

Construction
- Structure type: Underground

Other information
- Station code: E-33
- Website: www.kotsu.metro.tokyo.jp/subway/stations/ochiai-minami-nagasaki.html

History
- Opened: 19 December 1997; 28 years ago

Services
Preceding station	Toei Subway	Following station
Shin-egota towards Hikarigaoka	Ōedo Line	Nakai towards Tochōmae
Location
- Location within Special wards of Tokyo Location within Tokyo Bay and Bōsō Peninsula Location within Tokyo Location within Japan

Ochiai-minami-nagasaki Station (落合南長崎駅, Ochiai-minaminagasaki-eki) is a railway station at the Nishi-Ochiai itchōme intersection of Mejiro Dōri, Shin-Mejiro Dōri and Shin-Ōme-Kaidō in Shinjuku, Tokyo, Japan. It is served by the Toei Ōedo Line. Its station number is E-33.

== History ==
The station opened on December 19, 1997, when Line 12 was extended from Nerima to Shinjuku. Line 12 was renamed the Ōedo line on April 20, 2000.

The station lies on the boundary of Shinjuku and Toshima wards. Before it opened its name was intended to be simply Minami-Nagasaki (from the neighborhood in Toshima ward), but this was changed to reflect its position on the boundary.

== Lines ==
- Toei Ōedo Line

== Platforms ==
The platform is an island platform with two tracks.

1	Ōedo Line	Tochōmae, Roppongi, and Daimon
2	Ōedo Line	Nerima and Hikarigaoka

== Surroundings ==
- Kato Precision Railroad Models
