= Monzen-nakacho Station =

Metro station in Tokyo, Japan

Monzen-nakacho Station 門前仲町駅

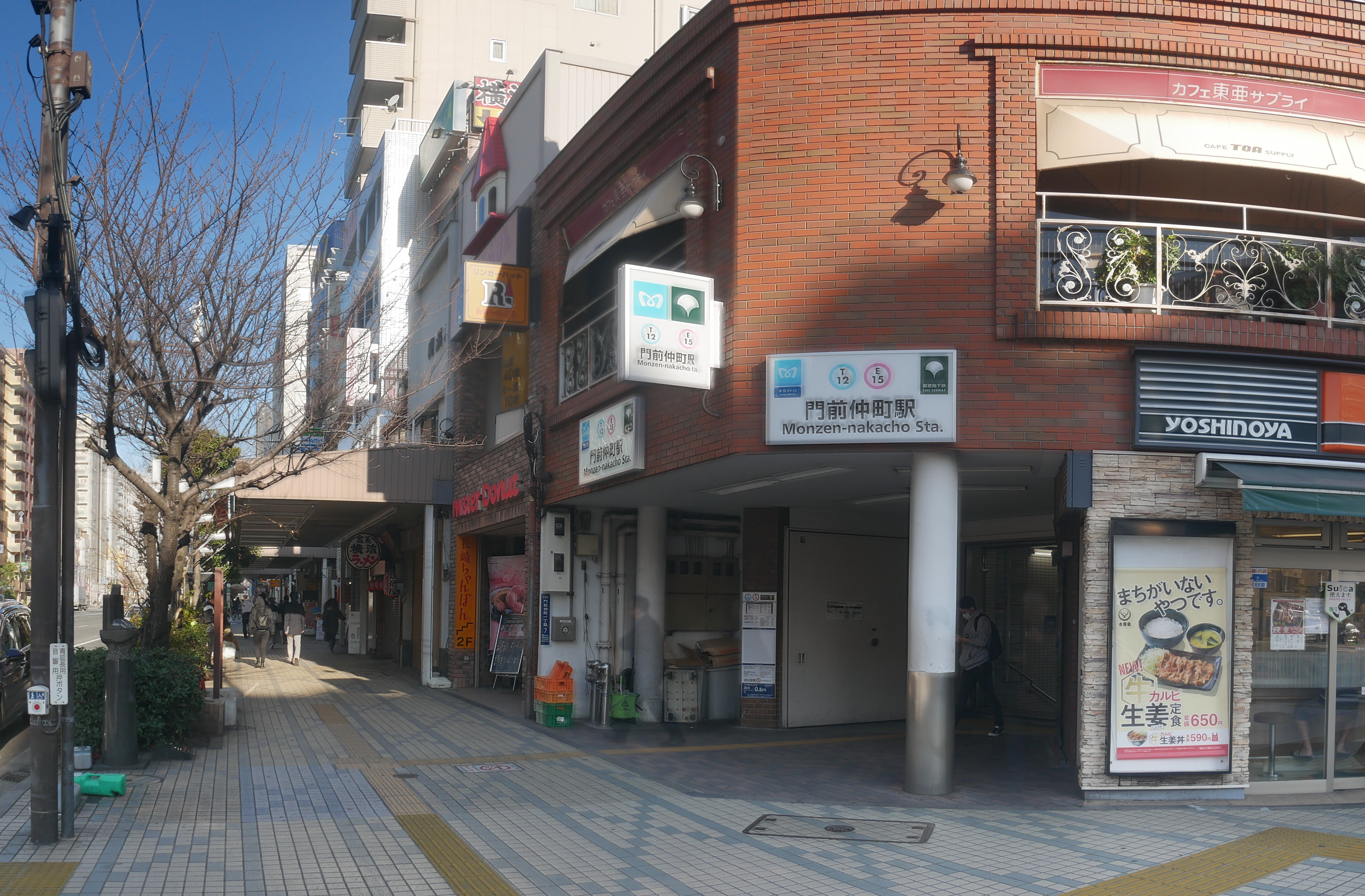
- Exit 3, 2018

General information
- Location: 1-4-8 Monzen-Nakachō, Kōtō-ku, Tokyo (Tokyo Metro); 2-5-2 Monzen-Nakachō, Kōtō-ku, Tokyo (Toei); Japan
- Coordinates: 35.671979°N 139.79579°E
- System: Tokyo subway
- Owner: Tokyo Metro Co., Ltd. Tokyo Metropolitan Government
- Operator: Tokyo Metro; Toei Subway
- Lines: Tōzai Line; Ōedo Line
- Platforms: 2 side platforms (Tozai), 1 island platform (Ōedo Line)
- Tracks: 4 (2 for each line)

Construction
- Structure type: Underground

Other information
- Station code: T-12, E-15

History
- Opened: 14 September 1967; 58 years ago

Services
Preceding station	Tokyo Metro	Following station
Kayabacho towards Nakano	Tōzai Line Rapid Commuter Rapid Local	Kiba towards Nishi-Funabashi
Preceding station	Toei Subway	Following station
Tsukishima towards Hikarigaoka	Ōedo Line	Kiyosumi-shirakawa towards Tochōmae
Location
- Location within Tokyo wards area Location within Kanto Area Location within Japan

Monzen-nakacho Station (門前仲町駅, Monzen-nakachō-eki) is a subway station located in the Monzen-nakachō district of Kōtō, Tokyo. The station opened on September 14, 1967.

== Lines ==
- Tokyo Metro Tozai Line (T-12)
- Toei Oedo Line (E-15)

== Platforms ==
=== Tokyo Metro ===
1	Tōzai Line	for Toyocho, Urayasu, and Nishi-funabashi; Tōyō Rapid Railway Line for Tōyō-Katsutadai; Chūō-Sōbu Line for Tsudanuma
2	Tozai Line	for Otemachi, Takadanobaba, and Nakano; Chūō-Sōbu Line for Ogikubo and Mitaka

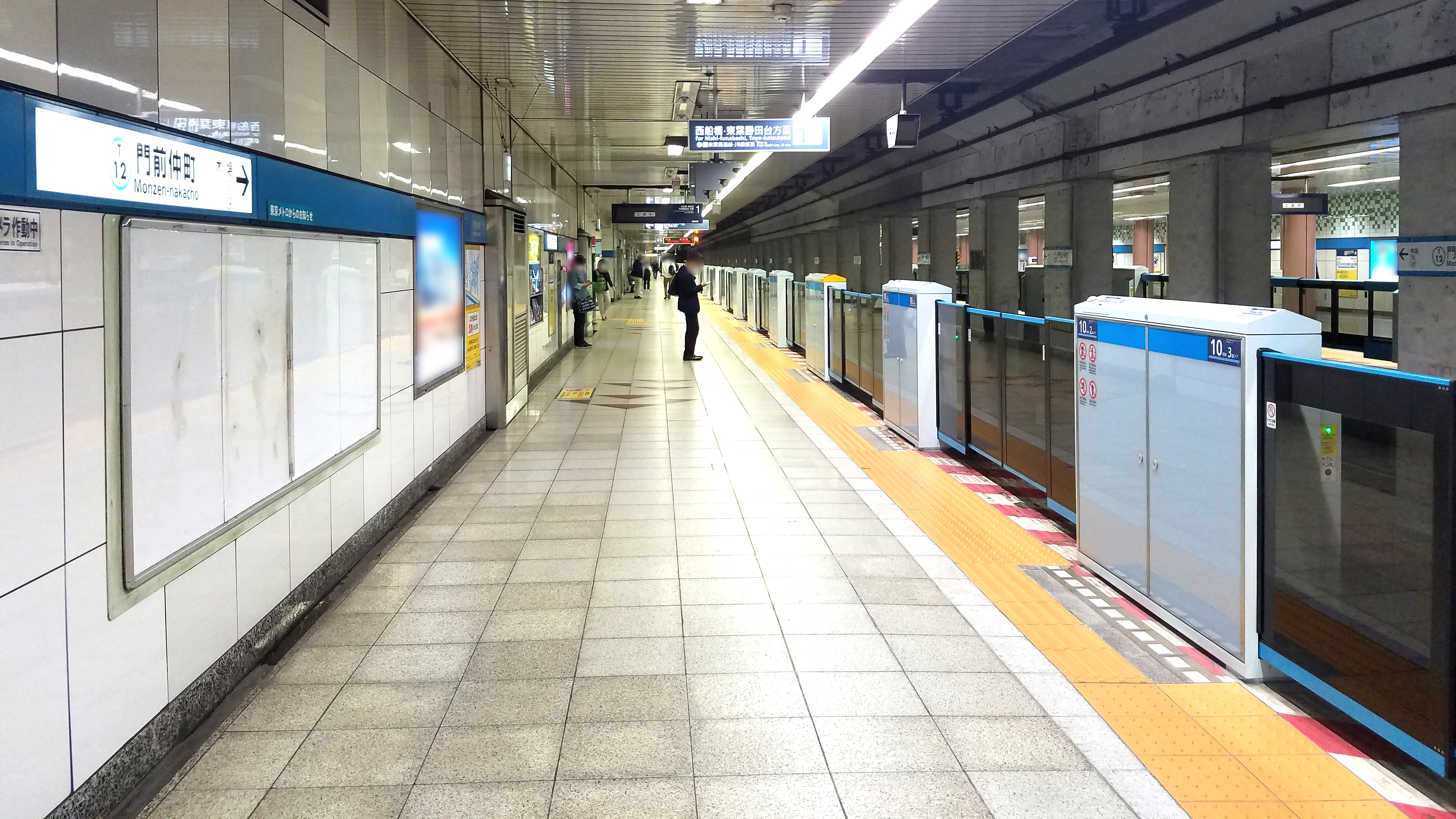
Tozai Line platforms, 2020

=== Toei ===
1	Ōedo Line	for Ryogoku, Iidabashi, and Higashi-shinjuku
2	Ōedo Line	for Daimon, Roppongi, Shinjuku, and Hikarigaoka

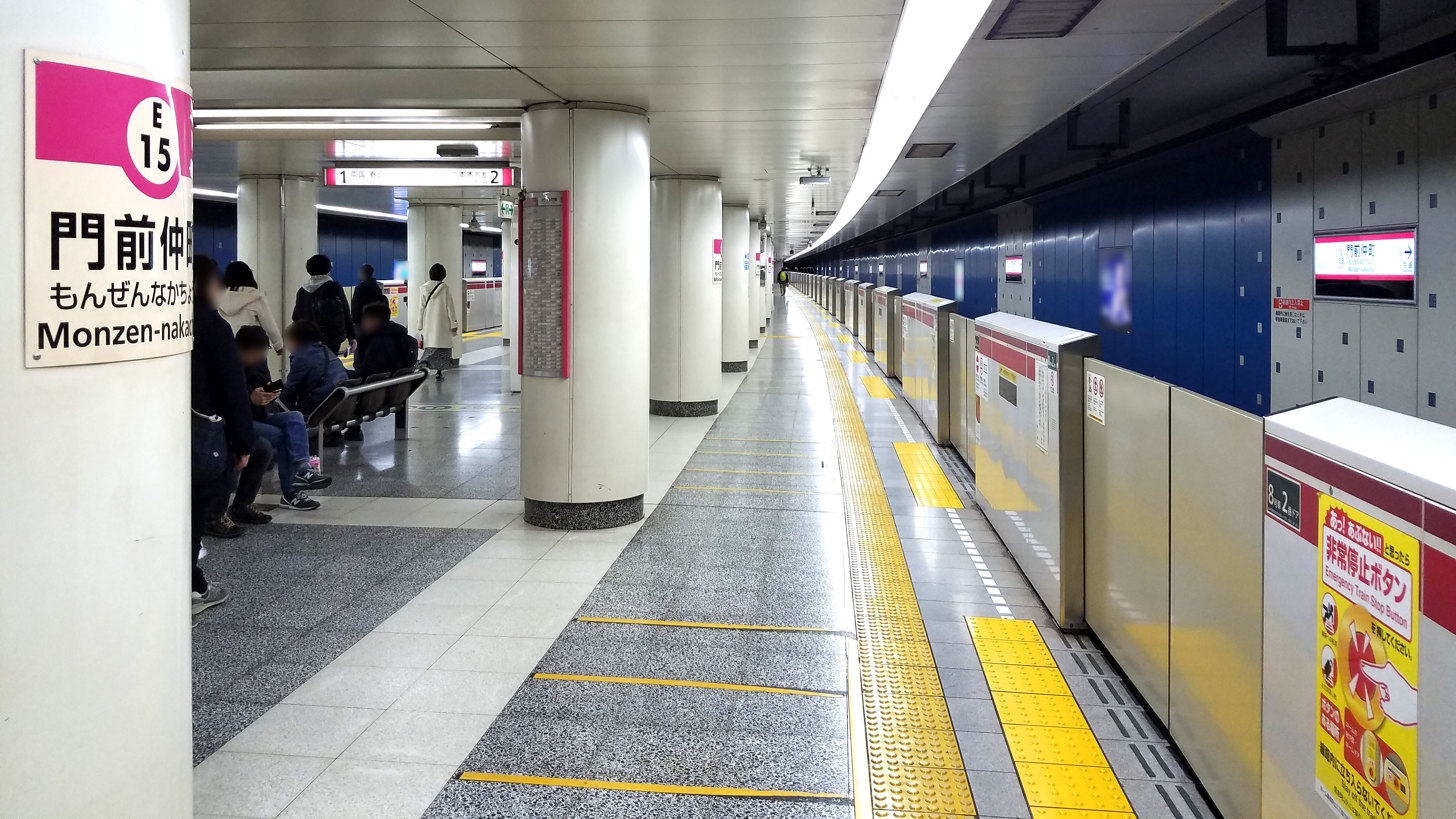
Oedo Line platforms, 2019

== History ==
The Tozai Line platforms opened on 14 September 1967 while the Oedo Line platforms opened on 12 December 2000.

The station facilities of the Tozai Line were inherited by Tokyo Metro after the privatization of the Teito Rapid Transit Authority (TRTA) in 2004.

== See also ==
- List of railway stations in Japan
