= E5000 =

E5000 may refer to:

- Toei Class E5000, a Japanese electric locomotive
- Nikon Coolpix 5000, a digital camera also known as the E5000 in non-US markets
- British Rail Class 71, a British electric locomotive class numbered in the E5000 series
