= Toei 12-600 series =

Type of Japanese train

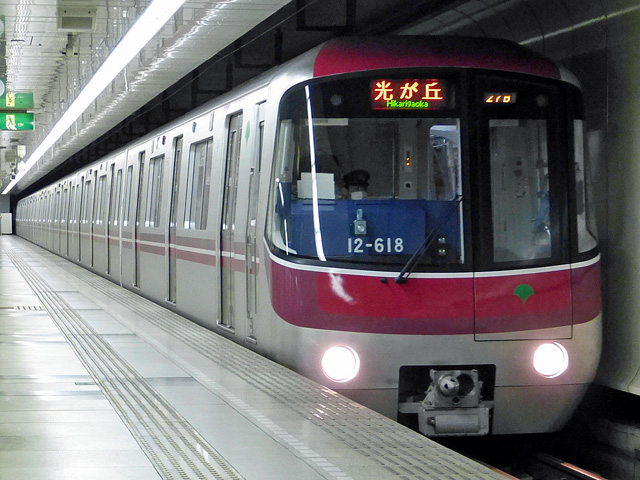
- 12-600 series set 61, March 2012
- In service: 2012–present
- Manufacturers: Kawasaki, Nippon Sharyo
- Replaced: 12-000 series
- Constructed: 2011–present
- Entered service: 2012
- Number built: 176 vehicles (22 sets)
- Number in service: 176 vehicles (22 sets)
- Formation: 8 cars per trainset
- Capacity: 780 (328/336 seated)
- Operator: Toei
- Depot: Kiba
- Line served: Toei Oedo Line

Specifications
- Car body construction: Aluminium
- Train length: 132.5 m (434 ft 8 9/16 in)
- Car length: 16,750 mm (54 ft 11 in) (end cars); 16,500 mm (54 ft 2 in) (intermediate cars)
- Width: 2,490 mm (8 ft 2 in)
- Height: 3,145 mm (10 ft 3.8 in)
- Doors: 3 pairs per side
- Maximum speed: 70 km/h (43 mph)
- Weight: 25.5–25.9 t (25–25 long tons; 28–29 short tons) per car
- Traction system: IGBT–VVVF and hybrid-SiC/IGBT–VVVF
- Traction motors: 16 × 120 kW (161 hp) 3-phase AC linear induction motor
- Power output: 1.92 MW (2,575 hp)
- Acceleration: 3.0 km/(h⋅s) (1.9 mph/s)
- Deceleration: 3.5 km/(h⋅s) (2.2 mph/s) (service); 4.5 km/(h⋅s) (2.8 mph/s) (emergency)
- Electric systems: 1,500 V DC overhead catenary
- Current collection: Pantograph
- Bogies: T-12D
- Braking systems: Regenerative and electro-pneumatic
- Safety systems: ATC, ATO
- Coupling system: Shibata rotary
- Track gauge: 1,435 mm (4 ft 8 1/2 in) standard gauge

The Toei 12-600 series (都営12-600形, Toei 12-600-gata) is an electric multiple unit (EMU) train type operated by the Tokyo subway operator Tokyo Metropolitan Bureau of Transportation (Toei) on the Toei Oedo Line in Tokyo, Japan. The first 12-600 series first entered service in 2012. A total of 22 eight-car sets were built from 2011 by Kawasaki and Nippon Sharyo.

== Overview ==
The 12-600 series sets were delivered from fiscal 2011. Broadly based on the earlier 12-000 series design (sets 16 to 53), these sets included a number of design improvements. The latest batch of sets entered service on 15 February 2019 and use a different headlamp setup, with a dual headlamp-taillamp fixture; as opposed to shield-beam headlamps as used on the first eight sets, these use LED fixtures.

As of 2018, ten sets are in service and are all based at Kiba Depot.

=== Formation ===
The 12-600 sets are formed as shown below, with all cars motored.

Car No.	1	2	3	4	5	6	7	8
Designation	M2c	M1	M2	M1	M1	M2	M1	M2c
Numbering	12-6x1	12-6x2	12-6x3	12-6x4	12-6x5	12-6x6	12-6x7	12-6x8
Weight (t)	25.5	25.9	25.8	25.9	25.9	25.8	25.9	25.7
Capacity (total/seated)	90/36	100/44	100/44	100/40	100/40	100/44	100/44	90/36

- Each M1 car is fitted with a single-arm pantograph.
- Car 5 is designated as a mildly-air-conditioned car.

=== Interior ===
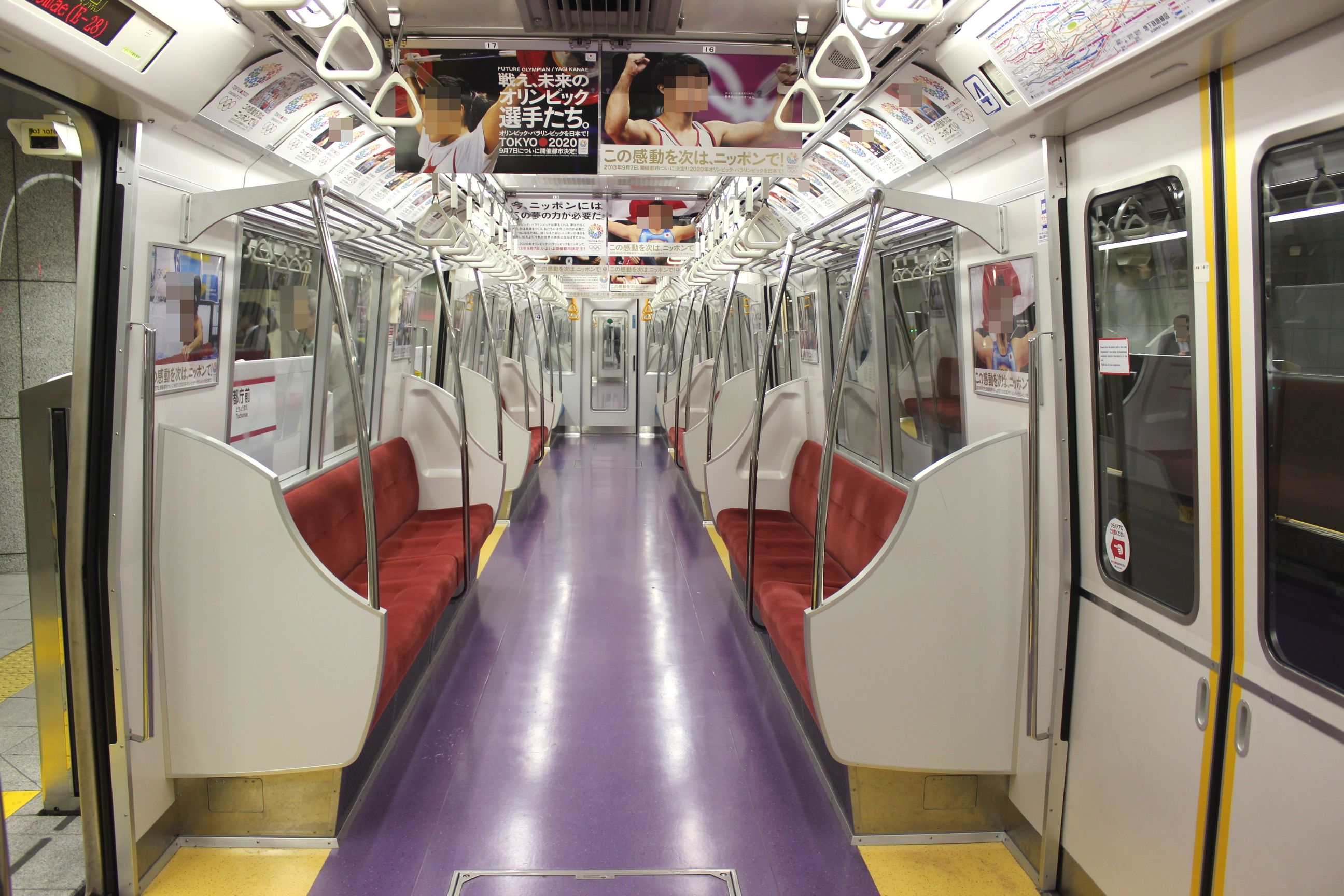
Interior of a 12-600 series set

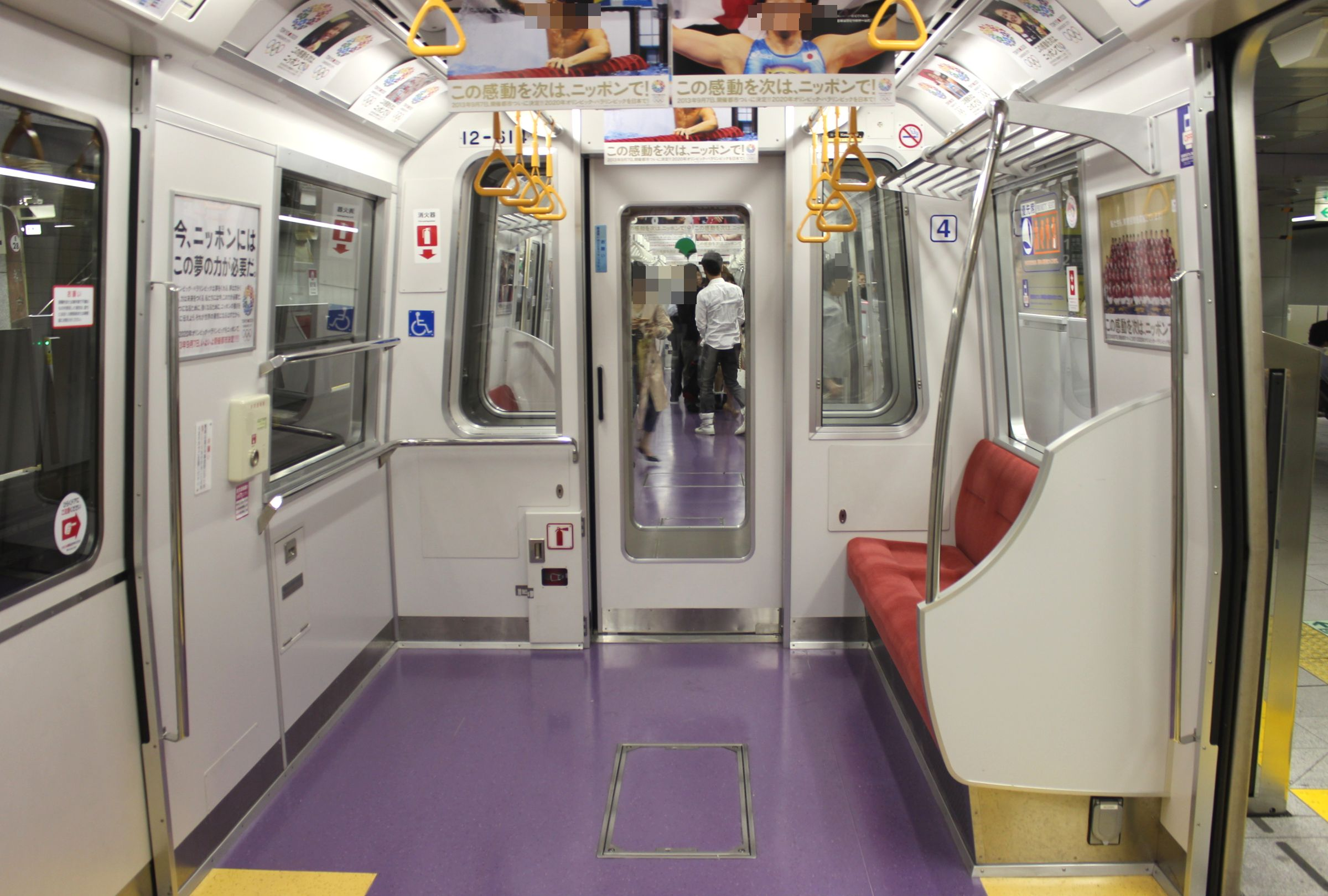
A wheelchair space at the end of a car

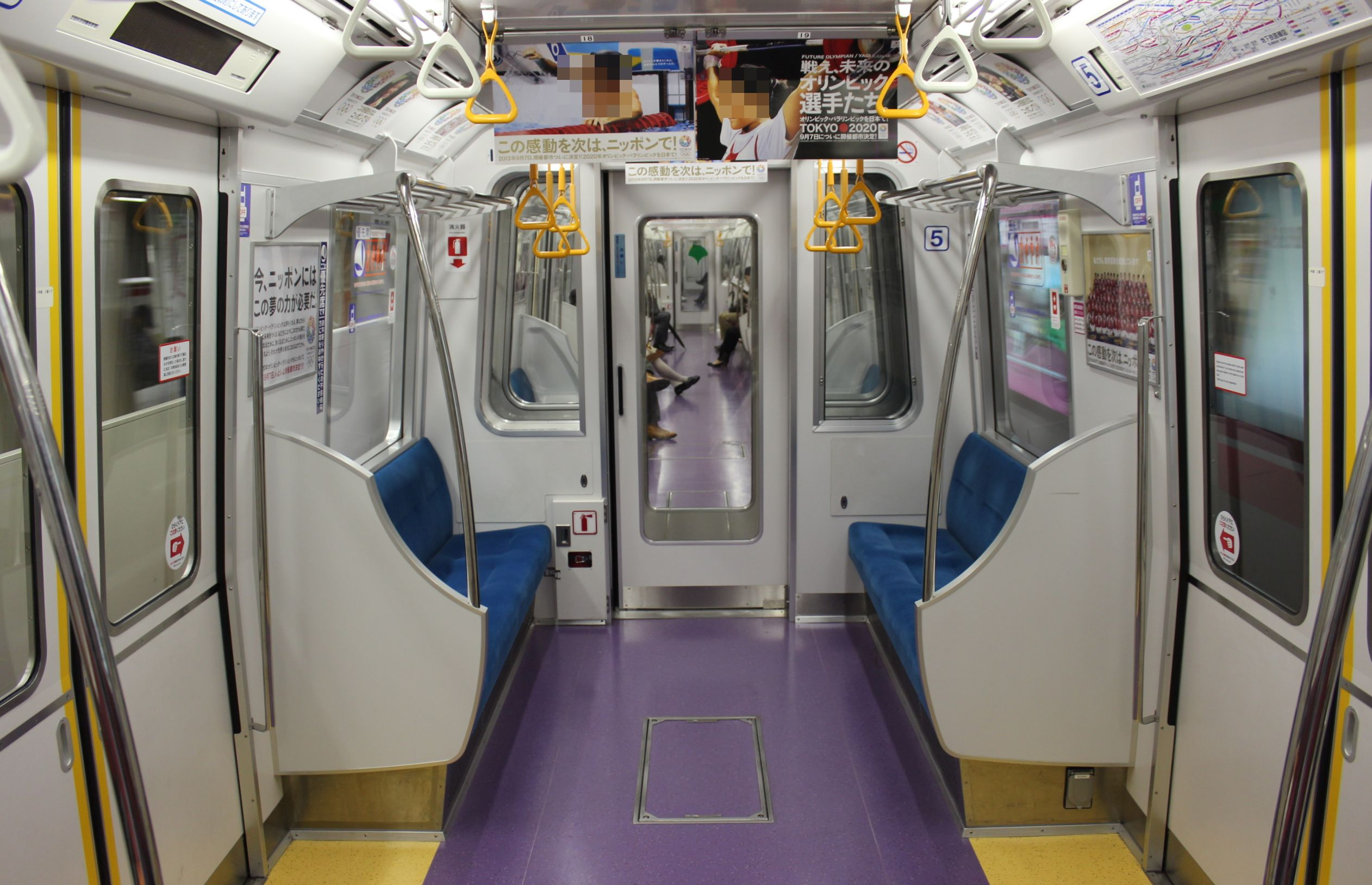
Priority seating

=== Build history ===
The 12-600 series fleet details are as shown below.

Set No.	Manufacturer	Date delivered
12-611	Kawasaki	20 November 2011
12-621	Kawasaki	9 April 2012
12-631	Nippon Sharyo	February 2015
12-641	Nippon Sharyo	March 2015
12-651	Nippon Sharyo	November 2015
12-661	Nippon Sharyo	November 2015
12-671	Nippon Sharyo	May 2016
12-681	Nippon Sharyo	June 2016
12-691	Kawasaki	18 May 2018
12-701	Kawasaki	
12-711	Kawasaki	
12-721	Kawasaki	
12-731	Kawasaki	
12-741	Kawasaki	
12-751	Kawasaki	
12-761	Kawasaki	
12-771	Kawasaki	
12-781	Kawasaki	
12-791	Kawasaki	
12-801	Kawasaki	22 September 2021
12-811	Kawasaki	20 January 2022
12-821	Kawasaki	29 July 2022

== History ==
The first 12-600 series set (cars 12-611 to 12-618) was delivered from the Kawasaki factory in Hyōgo Prefecture in August 2011. It entered service on 23 February 2012. On 30 March 2015, Toei Subway announced it had ordered a second batch of 12-600 series trains. On these trains, the magenta stripe is located at the height of the windows so it can be seen above the platform edge doors installed at every station. LCD information displays are provided above the doors. The trains entered service on 6 April 2015, with six units to be delivered by June 2016, replacing older 12-000 series trains.

11 additional 12-600 series trainsets (88 cars) were ordered from Kawasaki Heavy Industries in 2016. The first of these trains entered service in 2018, with four additional trainsets entering service per year until 2021.
