= Toei Ōedo Line =

Subway line in Tokyo, Japan

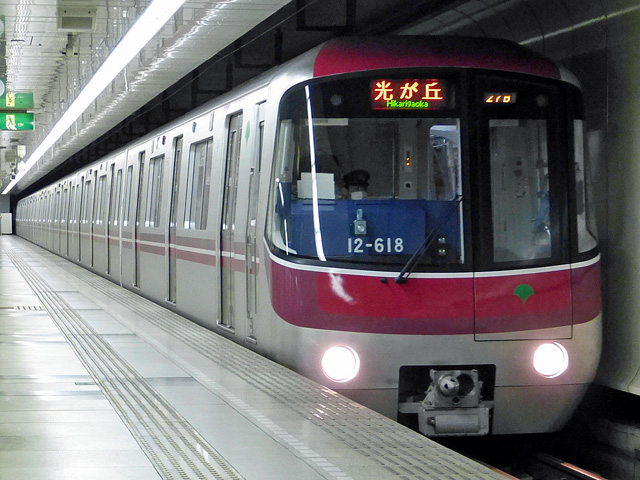
- A Toei 12-600 series train on the Ōedo Line

Overview
- Other name: Line 12
- Native name: 都営大江戸線
- Owner: Tokyo Metropolitan Bureau of Transportation
- Line number: E
- Locale: Tokyo
- Termini: Tochōmae; Hikarigaoka
- Stations: 38
- Color on map: Magenta

Service
- Type: Rapid transit
- System: Tokyo subway (Toei Subway)
- Operator: Tokyo Metropolitan Bureau of Transportation
- Depot: Kiba
- Rolling stock: Toei 12-000 and Toei 12-600 series
- Daily ridership: 933,621 (2016)

History
- Opened: 10 December 1991; 34 years ago
- Last extension: 2000

Technical
- Line length: 40.7 km (25.3 mi)
- Number of tracks: 2
- Track gauge: 1,435 mm (4 ft 8 1/2 in) standard gauge
- Minimum radius: 100 m (330 ft)
- Electrification: Overhead line, 1,500 V DC
- Operating speed: 70 km/h (43 mph)
- Signalling: Cab signalling, Closed block
- Train protection system: New CS-ATC, ATO
- Maximum incline: 5.0%
Route map
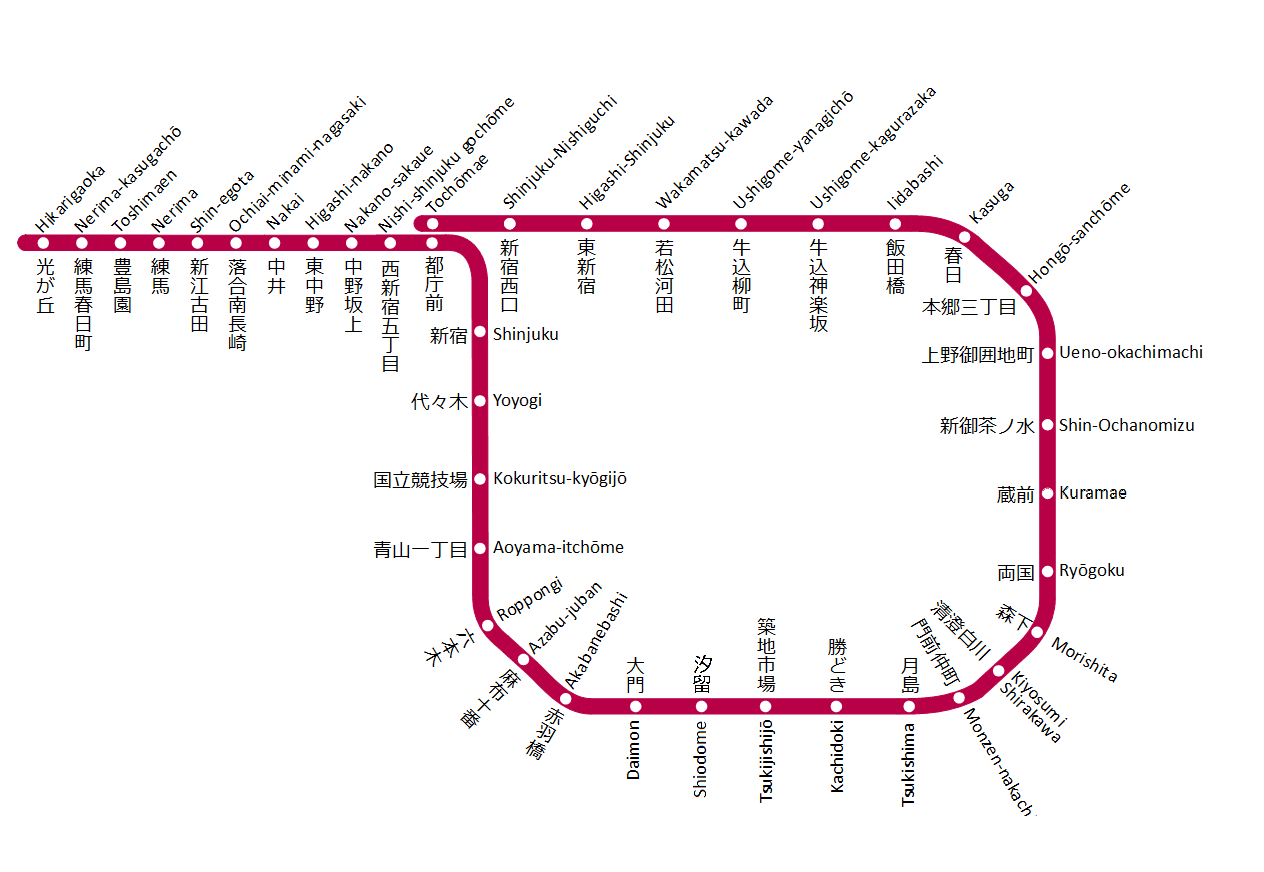

The Toei Ōedo Line (Japanese: 都営大江戸線, Hepburn: Toei Ōedo-sen; lit. 'Toei Greater Edo Line') is a rapid transit railway line of the municipal Toei Subway network in Tokyo, Japan.

The entire line was originally planned to open in 1985; however, the project was temporarily frozen following the 1973 oil crisis and remained on hold until the mid-1980s. It commenced full operations on 12 December 2000. Using the Japanese calendar, this reads as "12/12/12", as the year 2000 corresponds to Heisei 12. The line is completely underground, making it the second-longest railway tunnel in Japan after the Seikan Tunnel.

On maps and signboards, the line is shown in magenta. Stations carry the letter "E" followed by a two-digit number inside a more pinkish ruby circle.

In fiscal year 2023, the Ōedo Line had the highest daily ridership in the Toei network, serving an average of 836,179 passengers per day. Despite this, it was the only Toei subway line to operate at a loss, incurring a deficit of 3.2 billion yen.

== Overview ==
The Ōedo Line is the first Tokyo subway line to use linear motor propulsion (and the second in Japan after the Osaka Metro Nagahori Tsurumi-ryokuchi Line), which allows it to use smaller cars and smaller tunnels (a benefit similarly achieved by the Advanced Rapid Transit system manufactured by Bombardier). This technology, though, is incompatible with other railway and subway lines, which can only operate with vehicles utilizing conventional rotary motors, thus preventing Ōedo Line trains from operating through services onto them. Although vehicles with rotary motor propulsion can technically operate on the Ōedo Line, its smaller tunnels and loading gauge prevents such occurrences, hence making the Ōedo Line the first self-enclosed subway line in Tokyo in over 40 years, and the first and to date only such line operated by Toei, although there is a track connection to the Asakusa Line that can be used only by Class E5000 locomotives.

The line is deep (as low as 48 metres (157 ft) below ground at points) through central Tokyo, including three underground crossings of the Sumida River. Originally budgeted at ¥682.6 billion and 6 years, the construction ended up taking nearly 10 years and estimates of the final cost of construction range from the official ¥988.6 billion to over ¥1,400 billion, making it the most expensive subway line ever built at that point. However, stages 1–3 of Singapore's Downtown MRT line, completed in 2017, are 2.84 times as expensive, at 33,669.5 compared to 11,571.8 US dollars per kilometer after adjusting for inflation and international price differences. Phase 1 of New York's Second Avenue Subway, also completed in 2017, is over 5.5 times costlier per kilometer at 2,308.3 compared to 416.3 price-adjusted US dollars per kilometer.

Ridership projections originally estimated 1 million users daily, a figure scaled down to 820,000 before opening. At the end of 2006, the line was averaging 720,000 passengers/day. However, its ridership has increased by about five percent each year since its opening, following new commercial and residential development around major stations such as Roppongi and Shiodome. According to the Tokyo Metropolitan Bureau of Transportation, as of June 2009 the Ōedo Line was the fourth most crowded subway line in Tokyo, at its peak running at 178%^{[a]} capacity between Monzen-Nakachō and Tsukishima stations.

There are plans to extend the Ōedo Line westward from its current western terminus at Hikarigaoka Station through to a new terminus in Ōizumigakuenchō, 1.5 km (0.93 mi) north of Ōizumi-gakuen Station (on the Seibu Ikebukuro Line) then later towards Higashi-Tokorozawa Station (on the Musashino Line). The first segment to Ōizumigakuenchō, which will include three new stations in Doshida, Oizumimachi, and Oizumigakuencho, is expected to open around 2040 at a cost of 160 billion yen. Following the awarding of the 2020 Summer Olympics to Tokyo, there had been speculation regarding the addition of another 2.7 km (1.7 mi) to the proposed extension in order to extend the line to Niiza where the shooting range for the Olympics was to be located. A decision regarding this matter was expected in 2015.

== Services ==
The Ōedo Line runs in a loop around central Tokyo before branching out towards Nerima in the western suburbs, meaning the line is shaped like a figure 6 lying on its side. It is not a true loop line: trains from the western Hikarigaoka terminus run anticlockwise around the loop and terminate at the intermediate Tochōmae Station facing towards Hikarigaoka, and vice versa. The arrangement is very much like the London Underground Circle Line since 2009, but does not share any track segments with other lines.

The full 40.7 km (25.3 mi) trip from Tochōmae around the loop and onward to Hikarigaoka takes 81 minutes. Trains operate once every three to five minutes during rush hours, and once every six minutes during off-peak weekday hours, weekends and holidays.

== History ==
=== Planning ===
The Ōedo Line was first proposed in 1962 as a route running from Roka-kōen through Hōnan-chō, Shinjuku, Kasuga-chō, Umayabashi, Fukagawa, and Tsukishima, and onward to Azabu under the Urban Transportation Council Report No. 6 (都市交通審議会答申第6号). However, Keio opposed the plan on the grounds that the proposed route would traverse a key Keio Bus operating area and that the introduction of a subway would have a substantial adverse effect on its bus business.

In response, on March 27, 1964, the Urban Transportation Council accepted Keio's proposal and revised Line 9's route between Roka-kōen and Shinjuku to follow a quadruple-tracked Keio Line alignment via Sakurajōsui, Meidaimae, and Hatagaya.

The line was once again proposed in 1968 as an incomplete loop line from Shinjuku around northern and eastern Tokyo to Azabu. This plan was amended in 1972 to complete the loop back to Shinjuku, extend it to Hikarigaoka and add a spur line to Mejiro from the northern side. The Tokyo Metropolitan Government undertook construction of the line, which was initially called Toei Line 12 (都営地下鉄12号線, Toei Chikatetsu Jūnigō-sen).

Based on Report No.15, a license for the entire line, covering the section between present-day Hikarigaoka Station and Tochōmae Station and including both the radial and circular portions, was obtained in August 1974. Construction planning proceeded with the aim of opening the full line in 1985. At this stage, the line was planned to use 10-car trains with 20-meter-long standard-gauge (1,435 mm) cars, similar to those operated on the Shinjuku Line.

However, as a result of the abrupt change in social conditions following the 1973 oil crisis and the deterioration of the Transportation Bureau’s financial situation, the construction plan was temporarily frozen from mid-1976. As part of this process, an application submitted to the Ministry of Transport in December 1975 for approval to construct a large-capacity line using 20-meter cars in 10-car formations between Nerima and Hikarigaoka was never reviewed and was automatically cancelled following the suspension of the project.

Subsequently, the decision to redevelop the former Grant Heights site in the Hikarigaoka district, including the construction of a large-scale housing complex, significantly increased the need for improved transportation infrastructure. In response, the Tokyo Metropolitan Government decided in December 1982 to proceed with the construction of Line 12.

=== Construction and opening ===
On June 1, 1986, construction begins between Hikarigaoka and Nerima.

The first segment from Hikarigaoka to Nerima began operations on 10 December 1991. The line was extended from Nerima to Shinjuku on 19 December 1997, and later from Shinjuku to Kokuritsu-Kyōgijō on 20 April 2000.

With this extension, Shintaro Ishihara, the governor of Tokyo, named the line "Toei Oedo Line", where Oedo literally means "Great Edo", a reference to Tokyo's former name. As was the case with earlier lines, the public was initially polled to select a name; however, Ishihara rejected the chosen name, Tokyo Loop Line (東京環状線, Tōkyō Kanjō-sen), on the grounds that it would not initially form a complete loop, and that calling it such would cause confusion with the Yamanote Line and the Osaka Loop Line.

The full line began operation on 12 December 2000. An additional station (Shiodome Station) was opened on 2 November 2002 to connect to the Yurikamome guideway transit line. Following the addition of Shiodome, the automated announcements in the trains were changed to advertise businesses and facilities near each station, a first in Tokyo (although this was already the practice on the municipal subways of Osaka and Nagoya).

=== Operational changes ===
On 27 December 2020, the line experienced temporary service cuts due to the COVID-19 pandemic. This ended on 11 January 2021.

From 18 January 2023, car 4 was designated by the railway operator as a women-only car during the morning peak hour services on the Oedo line to reduce sexual assaults on board.

== Stations ==

All stations are located in Tokyo.

No.	Station	Distance in km (mi)		Transfers	Location
No.	Station	Between stations	Total	Transfers	Location
E-28	Tochōmae 都庁前	—N/a	0 (0)	For Hikarigaoka and Roppongi	Shinjuku
E-01	Shinjuku-nishiguchi 新宿西口	0.8 (0.50)	0.8 (0.50)	Marunouchi Line (M-08); Chūō Line (JC05); Chūō–Sōbu Line (JB10); Yamanote Line (JY17); Saikyō Line (JA11); Shōnan–Shinjuku Line (JS20); Odawara Line (OH01); Keiō Line/Keio New Line (KO01); Shinjuku Line; (Seibu Shinjuku: SS01)	Shinjuku
E-02	Higashi-shinjuku 東新宿	1.4 (0.87)	2.2 (1.4)	Fukutoshin Line (F-12)	Shinjuku
E-03	Wakamatsu-kawada 若松河田	1.0 (0.62)	3.2 (2.0)		Shinjuku
E-04	Ushigome-yanagicho 牛込柳町	0.6 (0.37)	3.8 (2.4)		Shinjuku
E-05	Ushigome-kagurazaka 牛込神楽坂	1.0 (0.62)	4.8 (3.0)		Shinjuku
E-06	Iidabashi 飯田橋	1.0 (0.62)	5.8 (3.6)	Tōzai Line (T-06); Yūrakuchō Line (Y-13); Namboku Line (N-10); Chūō–Sōbu Line (JB16)	Bunkyō
E-07	Kasuga 春日	1.0 (0.62)	6.8 (4.2)	Marunouchi Line (Korakuen: M-22); Namboku Line (Korakuen: N-11); Mita Line (I-12)	Bunkyō
E-08	Hongō-sanchōme 本郷三丁目	0.8 (0.50)	7.6 (4.7)	Marunouchi Line (M-21)	Bunkyō
E-09	Ueno-okachimachi 上野御徒町	1.1 (0.68)	8.7 (5.4)	Ginza Line (Ueno-hirokoji: G-15); Hibiya Line (Naka-okachimachi: H-17); Chiyoda Line (Yushima: C-13); Yamanote Line (Okachimachi: JY04); Keihin–Tōhoku Line (Okachimachi: JK29)	Taitō
E-10	Shin-okachimachi 新御徒町	0.8 (0.50)	9.5 (5.9)	Tsukuba Express (TX02)	Taitō
E-11	Kuramae 蔵前	1.0 (0.62)	10.5 (6.5)	Asakusa Line (A-17)	Taitō
E-12	Ryōgoku 両国	1.2 (0.75)	11.7 (7.3)	Chūō–Sōbu Line (JB21)	Sumida
E-13	Morishita 森下	1.0 (0.62)	12.7 (7.9)	Shinjuku Line (S-11)	Kōtō
E-14	Kiyosumi-shirakawa 清澄白河	0.6 (0.37)	13.3 (8.3)	Hanzōmon Line (Z-11)	Kōtō
E-15	Monzen-nakacho 門前仲町	1.2 (0.75)	14.5 (9.0)	Tōzai Line (T-12)	Kōtō
E-16	Tsukishima 月島	1.4 (0.87)	15.9 (9.9)	Yūrakuchō Line (Y-21)	Chūō
E-17	Kachidoki 勝どき	0.8 (0.50)	16.7 (10.4)		Chūō
E-18	Tsukijishijō 築地市場	1.5 (0.93)	18.2 (11.3)		Chūō
E-19	Shiodome 汐留	0.9 (0.56)	19.1 (11.9)	Yurikamome (U-02)	Minato
E-20	Daimon 大門	0.9 (0.56)	20.0 (12.4)	Asakusa Line (A-09); Yamanote Line (Hamamatsuchō: JY28); Keihin–Tōhoku Line (Hamamatsuchō: JK23); Haneda Airport Line (Monorail Hamamatsuchō: MO01)	Minato
E-21	Akabanebashi 赤羽橋	1.3 (0.81)	21.3 (13.2)	Mita Line (Shibakoen: I-05)	Minato
E-22	Azabu-juban 麻布十番	0.8 (0.50)	22.1 (13.7)	Namboku Line (N-04)	Minato
E-23	Roppongi 六本木	1.1 (0.68)	23.2 (14.4)	Hibiya Line (H-04)	Minato
E-24	Aoyama-itchōme 青山一丁目	1.3 (0.81)	24.5 (15.2)	Ginza Line (G-04); Hanzōmon Line (Z-03)	Minato
E-25	Kokuritsu-Kyōgijō 国立競技場	1.2 (0.75)	25.7 (16.0)	Chūō–Sōbu Line (Sendagaya: JB12)	Shinjuku
E-26	Yoyogi 代々木	1.5 (0.93)	27.2 (16.9)	Chūō–Sōbu Line (JB11); Yamanote Line (JY18)	Shibuya
E-27	Shinjuku 新宿	0.6 (0.37)	27.8 (17.3)	Shinjuku Line (S-01); Chūō Line (JC05); Chūō–Sōbu Line (JB10); Yamanote Line (JY17); Saikyō Line (JA11); Shōnan–Shinjuku Line (JS20); Odawara Line (OH01); Keiō Line/Keio New Line (KO01)	Shibuya
E-28	Tochōmae 都庁前	0.8 (0.50)	28.6 (17.8)	For Iidabashi	Shinjuku
E-29	Nishi-shinjuku-gochome 西新宿五丁目	0.8 (0.50)	29.4 (18.3)		Shinjuku
E-30	Nakano-sakaue 中野坂上	1.2 (0.75)	30.6 (19.0)	Marunouchi Line (M-06)	Nakano
E-31	Higashi-Nakano 東中野	1.0 (0.62)	31.6 (19.6)	Chūō–Sōbu Line (JB08)	Nakano
E-32	Nakai 中井	0.8 (0.50)	32.4 (20.1)	Shinjuku Line (SS04)	Shinjuku
E-33	Ochiai-minami-nagasaki 落合南長崎	1.3 (0.81)	33.7 (20.9)		Shinjuku
E-34	Shin-egota 新江古田	1.6 (0.99)	35.3 (21.9)		Nakano
E-35	Nerima 練馬	1.6 (0.99)	36.9 (22.9)	Ikebukuro Line (SI06); Seibu Yūrakuchō Line (SI06); Toshima Line (SI06)	Nerima
E-36	Toshimaen 豊島園	0.9 (0.56)	37.8 (23.5)	Toshima Line (SI39)	Nerima
E-37	Nerima-kasugachō 練馬春日町	1.5 (0.93)	39.3 (24.4)		Nerima
E-38	Hikarigaoka 光が丘	1.4 (0.87)	40.7 (25.3)		Nerima

== Rolling stock ==
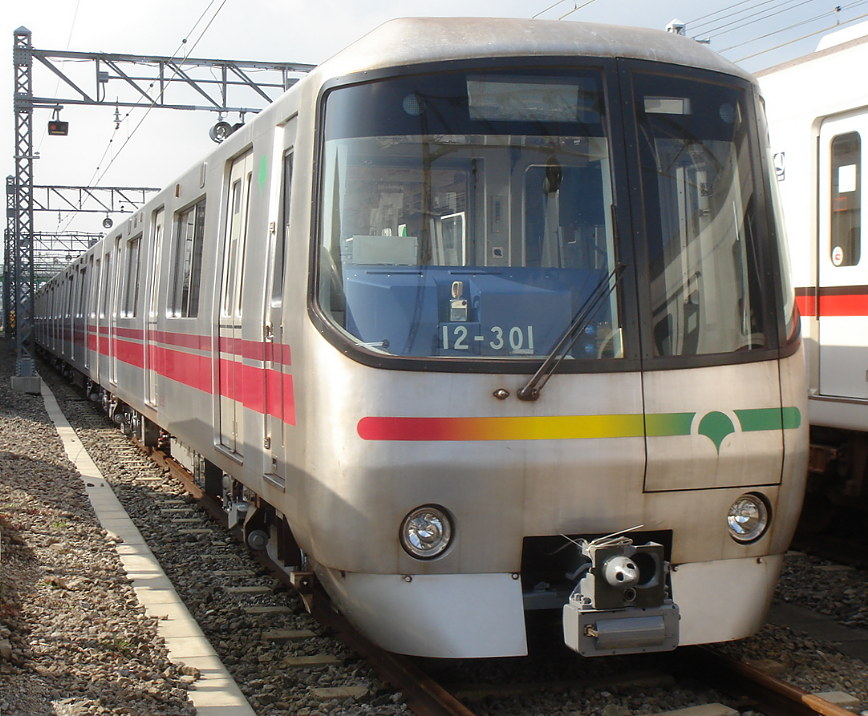
An Oedo Line 12-000 series trainset

- Toei 12-000 series 8-car EMU trainsets
- Toei 12-600 series 8-car EMU trainsets

Oedo Line trains are housed and maintained at the Kiba depot, located underneath Kiba Park to the southeast of Kiyosumi-Shirakawa Station. Prior to the completion of the Oedo Line loop in 2000, servicing was performed at a depot near Hikarigaoka Station.

Major overhaul work for Oedo Line trains is performed at the Magome depot, located south of Nishi-Magome Station on the Toei Asakusa Line. Oedo Line trains access this facility using a connecting tunnel to the Asakusa Line near Shiodome Station. Because of differences in infrastructure and technology used preventing trains on either line from accessing the other, a special Toei Class E5000 locomotive powers these ferry runs during overnight hours when the subway is closed.

== Noise complaints ==
The Ōedo line is one of the noisiest train lines in the world, with decibel levels reaching 90 decibels frequently along the line. However, during the COVID-19 pandemic, noise levels have reached to over 105 decibels. The train line's president states that infection is a more significant concern [than hearing damage], and therefore train's windows are kept open to increase ventilation, which caused a number of complaints. As of April 2023, windows continue to be kept open to reduce the risks of COVID-19 transmission. The cause of the Ōedo line's high noise levels lies in construction constraints such as preexisting infrastructure and the need to build deep tunnels, resulting in low-radius curves and small tunnels.

== Notes ==
a. Crowding levels defined by the Ministry of Land, Infrastructure, Transport and Tourism:

100% — Commuters have enough personal space and are able to take a seat or stand while holding onto the straps or hand rails.
150% — Commuters have enough personal space to read a newspaper.
180% — Commuters must fold newspapers to read.
200% — Commuters are pressed against each other in each compartment but can still read small magazines.
250% — Commuters are pressed against each other, unable to move.

== See also ==
- List of railway lines in Japan
- London Underground Circle Line, Bangkok MRT Blue Line and Hamburg U3, three metro lines with similar arrangements
