= Toei Class E5000 =

Japanese electric locomotive class

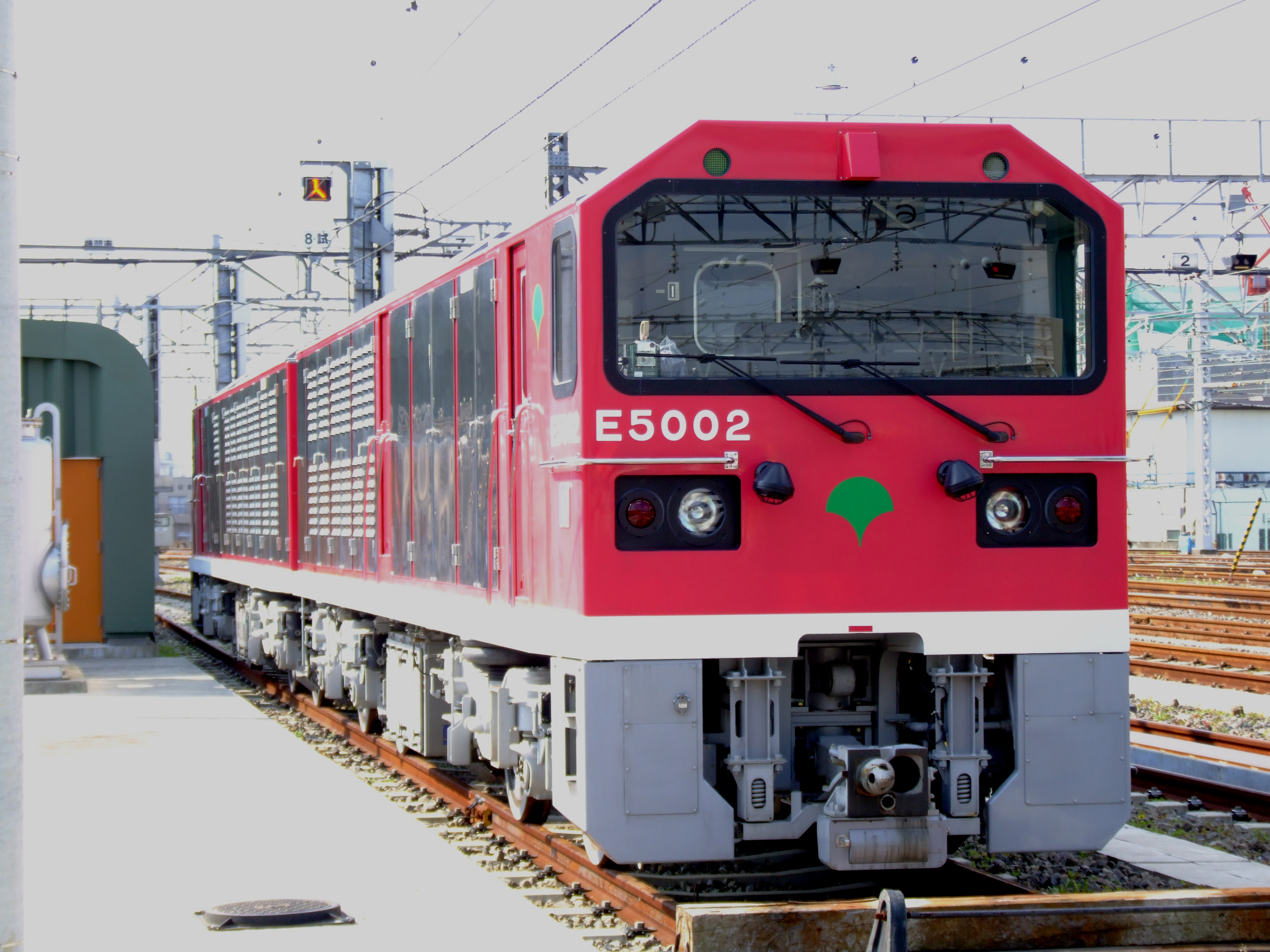
- E5000 class loco number E5002, October 2006
Type and origin
- Power type: Electric
- Builder: Kawasaki
- Total produced: 4
Specifications
- Configuration
  - UIC: Bo′Bo′+Bo′Bo′
- Gauge: 1,435 mm (4 ft 8 1/2 in) standard gauge
- Bogies: T-1D
- Wheel diameter: 860 mm (33 7/8 in)
- Wheelbase: 2.1 m (6 ft 10 11/16 in)
- Length
  - Over couplers: 12.5 m (41 ft 1/8 in)
- Width: 2.47 m (8 ft 1 1/4 in)
- Height
  - Pantograph: 3,145 mm (10 ft 3 13/16 in)
- Loco weight: 2 × 41.8 t (41.1 long tons; 46.1 short tons)
- Electric system/s: 1,500 V DC (nominal) from overhead catenary
- Current pickup: Pantograph
- Alternator: 2-level IGBT–VVVF inverter control Original: Siemens T-INV5; 2017 replacement: Toyo Denki
- Traction motors: 4 × 190 kW (250 hp) 3-phase AC induction motor
- Transmission: WN drive
- Gear ratio: 6.733 : 1 (101 / 15)
- Couplers: Shibata rotary
Performance figures
- Maximum speed: 70 km/h (45 mph)
- Power output: 1.52 MW (2,040 hp)
- Acceleration: 2 km/(h⋅s) (1.2 mph/s)
- Deceleration: 3.5 km/(h⋅s) (2.2 mph/s) (normal when towing); 4 km/(h⋅s) (2.5 mph/s) (normal when alone); 4.5 km/(h⋅s) (2.8 mph/s) (emergency)
Career
- Operators: Tokyo Metropolitan Bureau of Transportation
- Number in class: 4 (2 married-pairs)
- Numbers: MC1: E5001, E5003; MC2: E5002, E5004
- Locale: Tokyo
- Delivered: 2005
- First run: 2006

The E5000 (E5000形) is a class of four DC electric locomotives operated by Tokyo Metropolitan Bureau of Transportation (Toei) in Japan.

Four locomotives (numbered E5001 to E5004) were delivered from Kawasaki in 2005 for use in hauling linear-motor powered Ōedo Line trainsets to the Magome Workshops on the Asakusa Line in Ōta, Tokyo for heavy overhaul from 2006, following the completion of the Shiodome Link Line. They are single-ended locomotives which work as permanently coupled pairs.

== Manufacturing history ==
Initially, the Tokyo Metropolitan Bureau of Transportation (TMTB) had planned to build a factory facility at the Kiba Inspection and Repair Yard to carry out major and general inspections of Oedo Line rolling stock (12-000 and 12-600 series ). However, due to the high construction costs and the planned renovation of the Asakusa Line's Magome Inspection and Repair Yard, it was decided to build a connecting line called the "Shiodome Link Line" between the Oedo Line and the Asakusa Line, which have the same track gauge 1,435 mm (4 ft 8 1/2 in) standard gauge and are both electrified by 1500 V DC overhead lines.

The Shiodome Link Line starts at Shiodome Station on the Oedo Line, crosses directly above the JR Yokosuka Line's Tokyo Tunnel, directly underneath the Route 2 Loop Road, the Tokaido Shinkansen, and the Tokaido Main Line (Tokaido Line, Yamanote Line, and Keihin- Tohoku Line), and terminates between Daimon and Shimbashi on the Asakusa Line. It was completed and opened for use on April 1, 2006. It has a single-track box-type tunnel structure with a length of 483 m (1,585 ft). It features an 80-metre (260 ft) radius curve and a gradient of approximately 48 ‰ along the way.
