= Toei 12-000 series =

Japanese train type

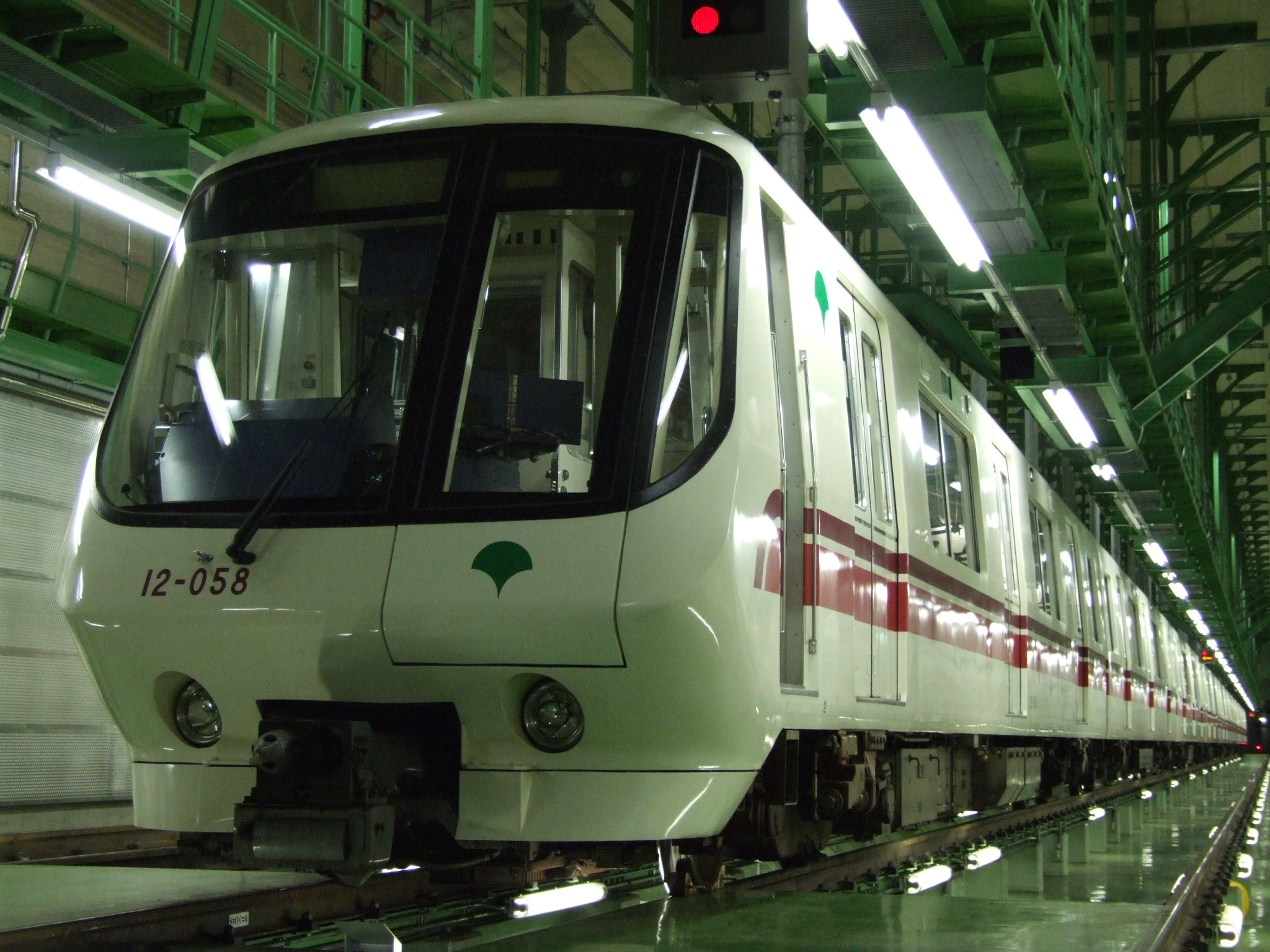
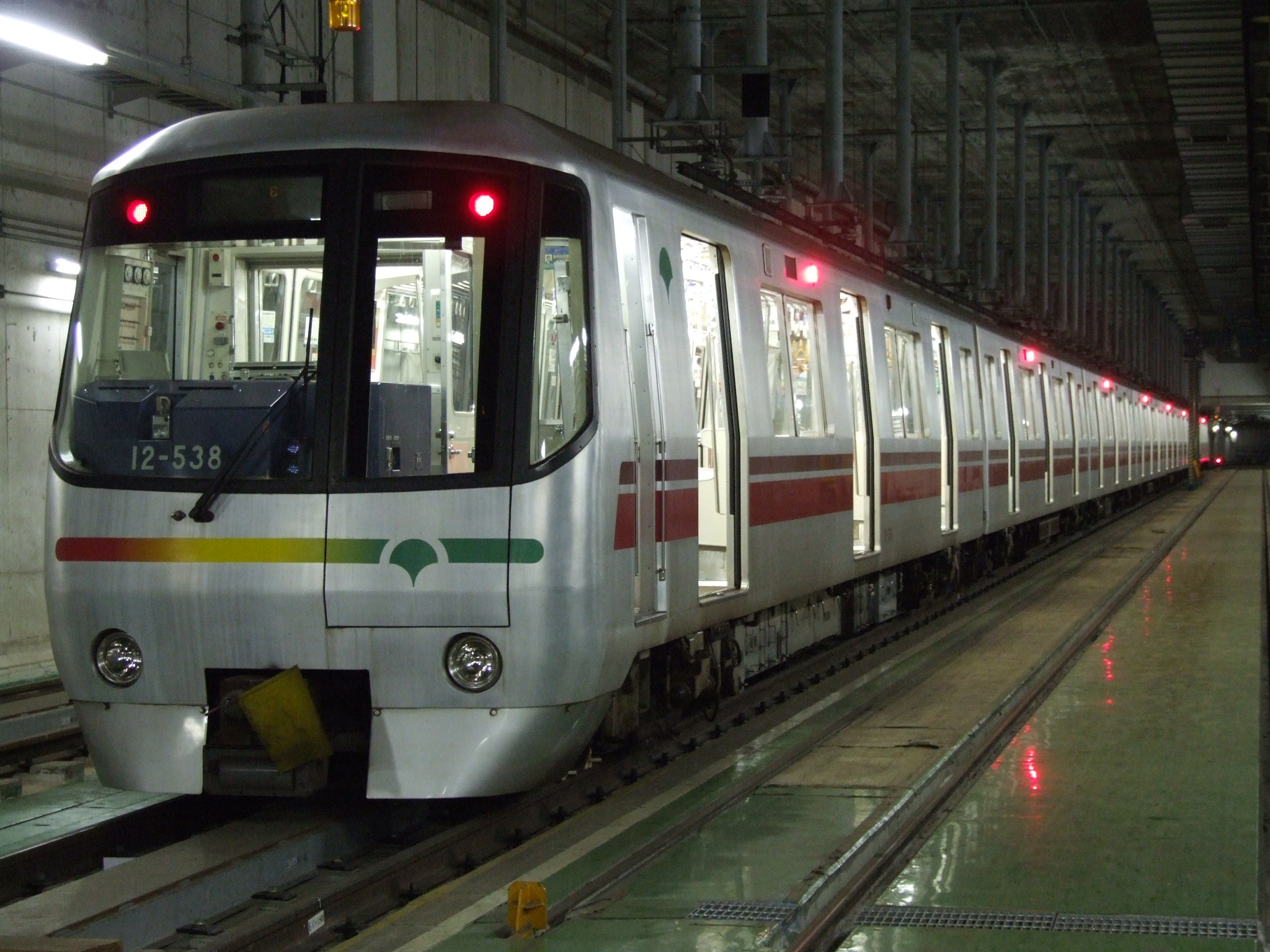
- Painted 12-000 series set 05, November 2007 Unpainted 12-000 series set 53, November 2007
- In service: 1991–present
- Manufacturers: Tokyu Car Corporation (prototype set), Nippon Sharyo, Hitachi Rail (3rd and 4th batches)
- Constructed: 1990–2000
- Entered service: 1991
- Scrapped: 2016 (First-batch vehicles)
- Number built: 424 vehicles (53 sets; excluding prototype)
- Number in service: 376 vehicles (47 sets; excluding prototype)
- Number preserved: 2 vehicles
- Number scrapped: 48 vehicles (6 sets)
- Formation: 8 cars per trainset
- Capacity: 780 (328/336 seated)
- Operator: Toei
- Depot: Kiba
- Line served: Toei Oedo Line

Specifications
- Car body construction: Aluminium
- Train length: 132.5 m (434 ft 8 9/16 in)
- Car length: 16,750 mm (54 ft 11 in) (end cars); 16,500 mm (54 ft 2 in) (intermediate cars)
- Width: 2,498 mm (8 ft 2.3 in)
- Height: 3,145 mm (10 ft 4 in)
- Floor height: 800 mm (31 in)
- Doors: 3 pairs per side
- Maximum speed: 70 km/h (43 mph)
- Weight: 25 t (25 long tons; 28 short tons) per car (1st-2nd batches); 24–25 t (24–25 long tons; 26–28 short tons) per car (3rd-4th batches)
- Traction system: GTO–VVVF and IGBT–VVVF
- Traction motors: 16 × 120 kW (161 hp) 3-phase AC linear induction motor
- Power output: 1.92 MW (2,575 hp)
- Acceleration: 3.0 km/(h⋅s) (1.9 mph/s)
- Deceleration: 3.5 km/(h⋅s) (2.2 mph/s) (service); 4.5 km/(h⋅s) (2.8 mph/s) (emergency)
- Electric systems: 1,500 V DC (overhead catenary)
- Current collection: Pantograph
- Bogies: T-12D
- Braking systems: Regenerative and electro-pneumatic
- Safety systems: ATC, ATO
- Coupling system: Shibata rotary
- Track gauge: 1,435 mm (4 ft 8 1/2 in) standard gauge

The Toei 12-000 series (都営12-000形, Toei 12-000-gata) is an electric multiple unit (EMU) train type operated by the Tokyo subway operator Tokyo Metropolitan Bureau of Transportation (Toei) on the Toei Oedo Line in Tokyo, Japan.

Following testing of a two-car prototype in the late 1980s, the 12-000 series was introduced into service in December 1991. A total of 53 eight-car 12-000 series sets were built between 1990 and 2000 by Nippon Sharyo and Hitachi.

== Formation ==
Designation	M2c	M1	M2	M1	M1	M2	M1	M2c
Numbering	12-xx1	12-xx2	12-xx3	12-xx4	12-xx5	12-xx6	12-xx7	12-xx8

- Each M1 car is fitted with a lozenge-type pantograph.
- Car 5 is designated as a mildly-air-conditioned car.

== Interior ==
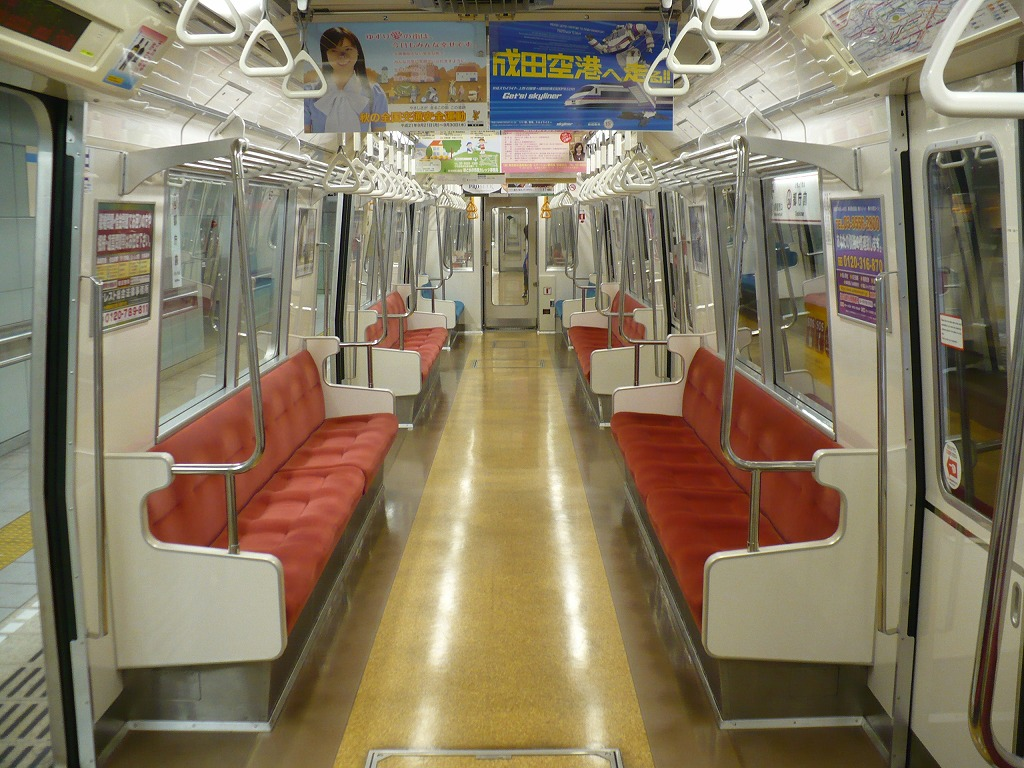
Interior view

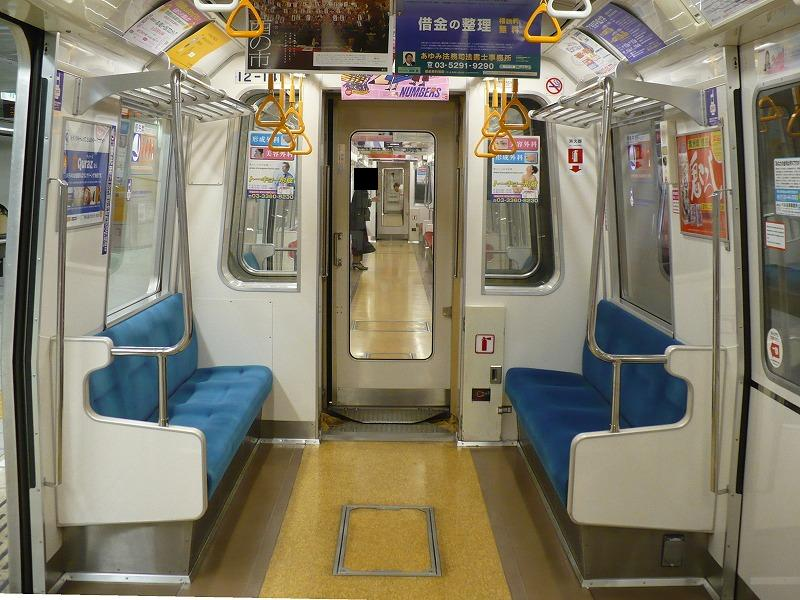
Interior view, showing priority seating

== History ==
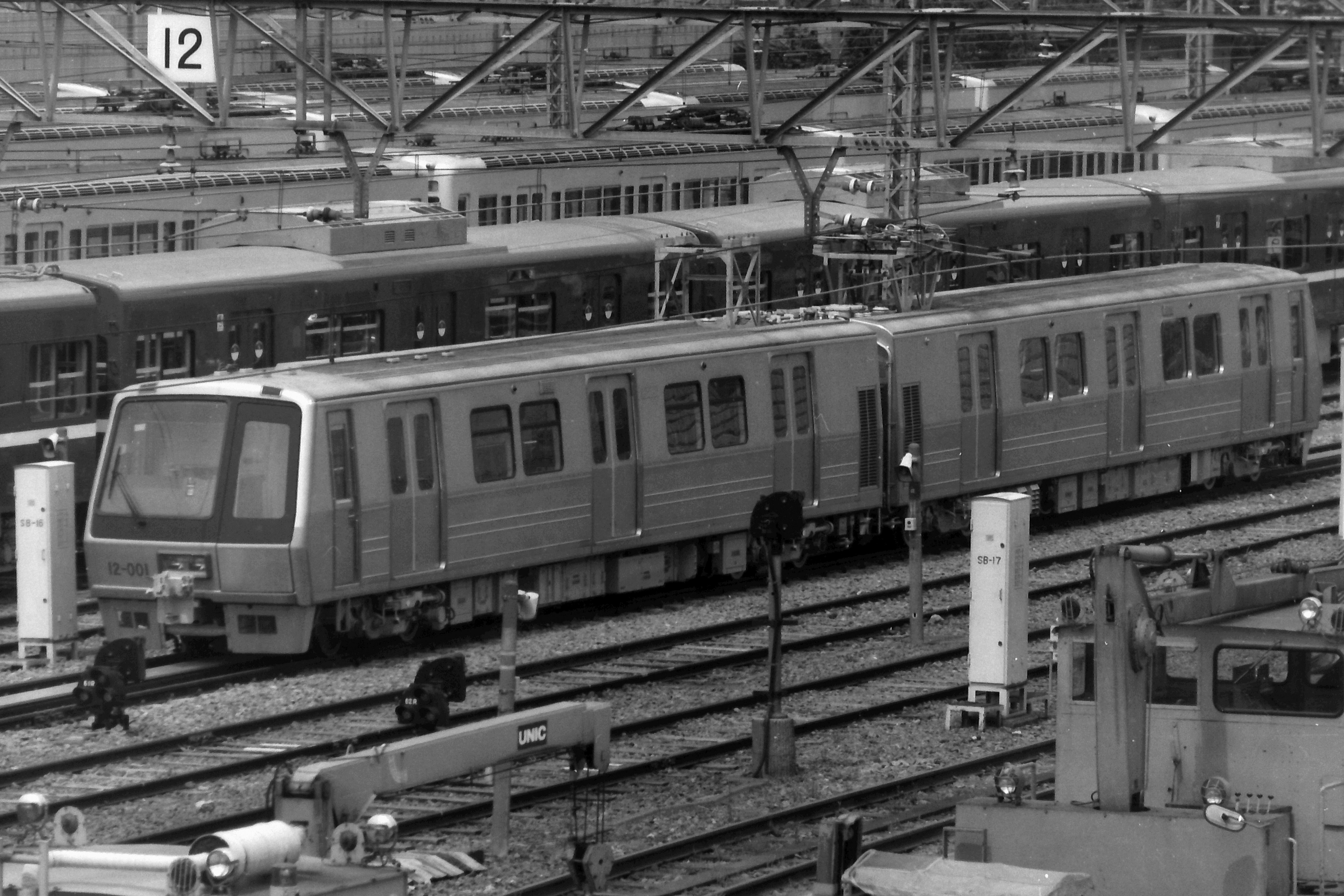
The prototype two-car set at Magome Depot in May 1989

Two prototype cars, numbered 12-001 and 12-002, were delivered from Tokyu Car Corporation in April 1986. These cars had stainless steel bodies and were originally built with conventional traction motors. The cars were converted to linear motor propulsion in 1987, with testing conducted on a special test track at Magome Depot. Following successful testing, it was announced in December 1988 that linear motor propulsion would be used for the new Toei Ōedo Line (then Line 12) under construction in Tokyo.

The first production trains were delivered as six-car sets from Nippon Sharyo to Hikarigaoka Depot from September 1990 for testing on the line between Hikarigaoka and Nerima before entering revenue service in December 1991. By 2001, a total of 424 vehicles were built by Nippon Sharyo and Hitachi, formed as 53 eight-car sets. The production trains featured aluminium bodies, and the first six sets were painted.

The last remaining first-batch trains (sets 01 to 06) began withdrawal in June 2016. The final first-batch train was retired from service on 30 June 2016.

== Preserved examples ==
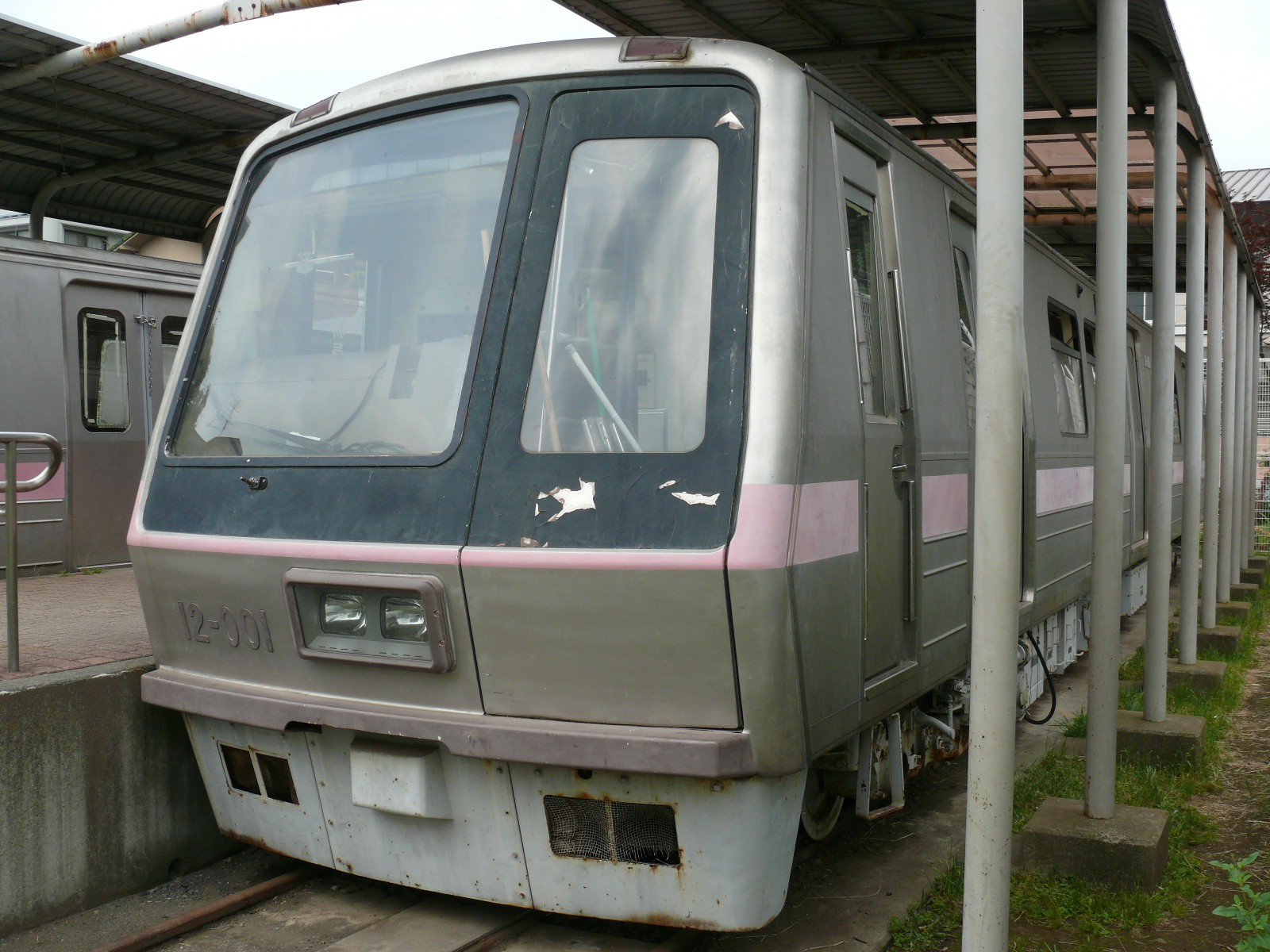
Preserved prototype car 12-001 at Chihaya Flower Park in Toshima, Tokyo, June 2008

The two prototype cars, 12-001 and 12-002, are preserved at Chihaya Flower Park in Toshima, Tokyo.

== Gallery ==
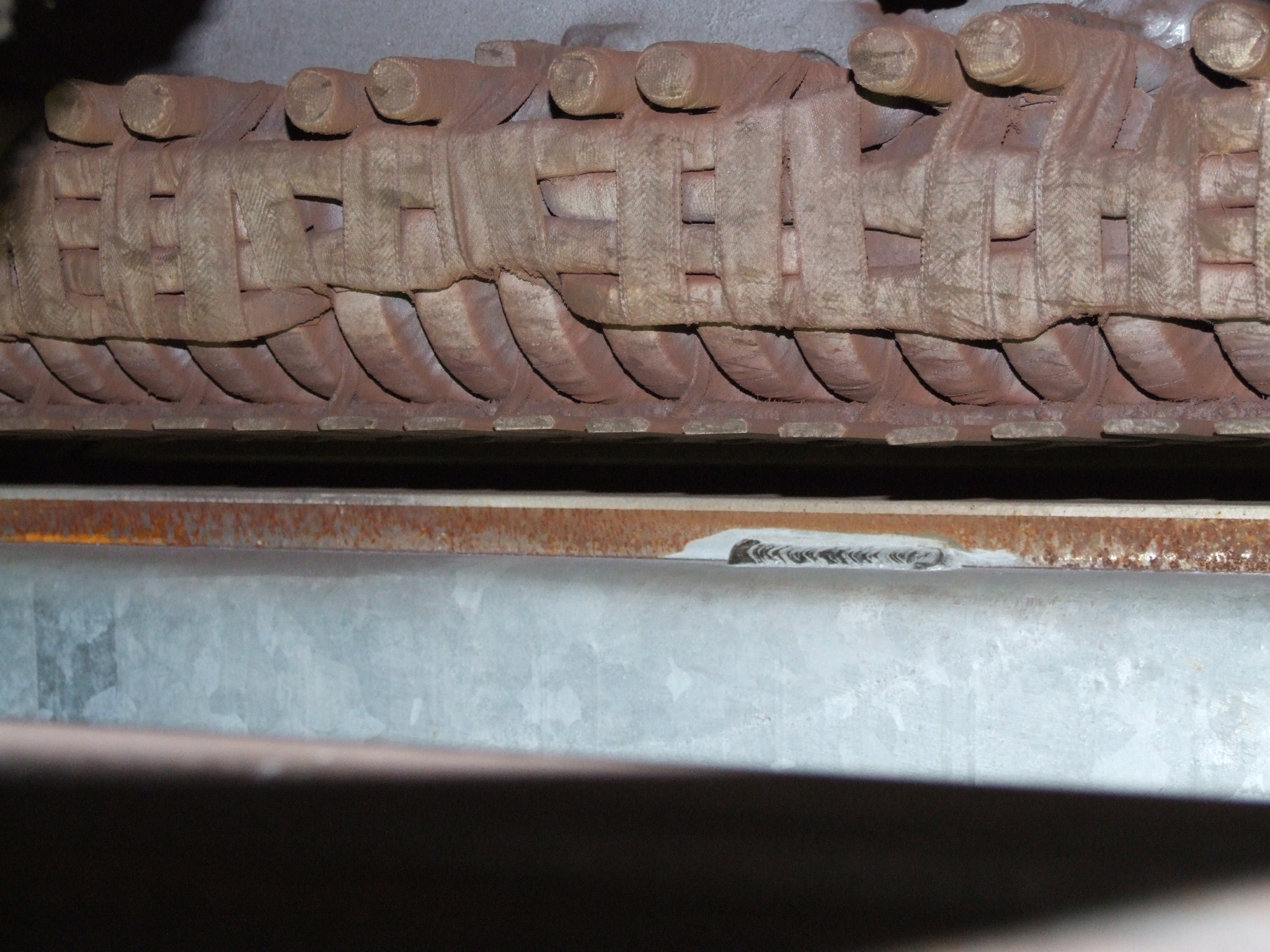
Linear motor as used on the 12-000 series

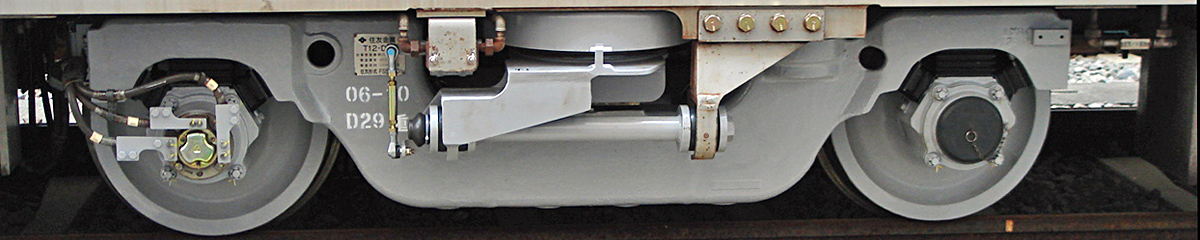
T-12D bogie as used on the Toei 12-000 series. Note the low height of the bogie enabled by the use of linear motors.

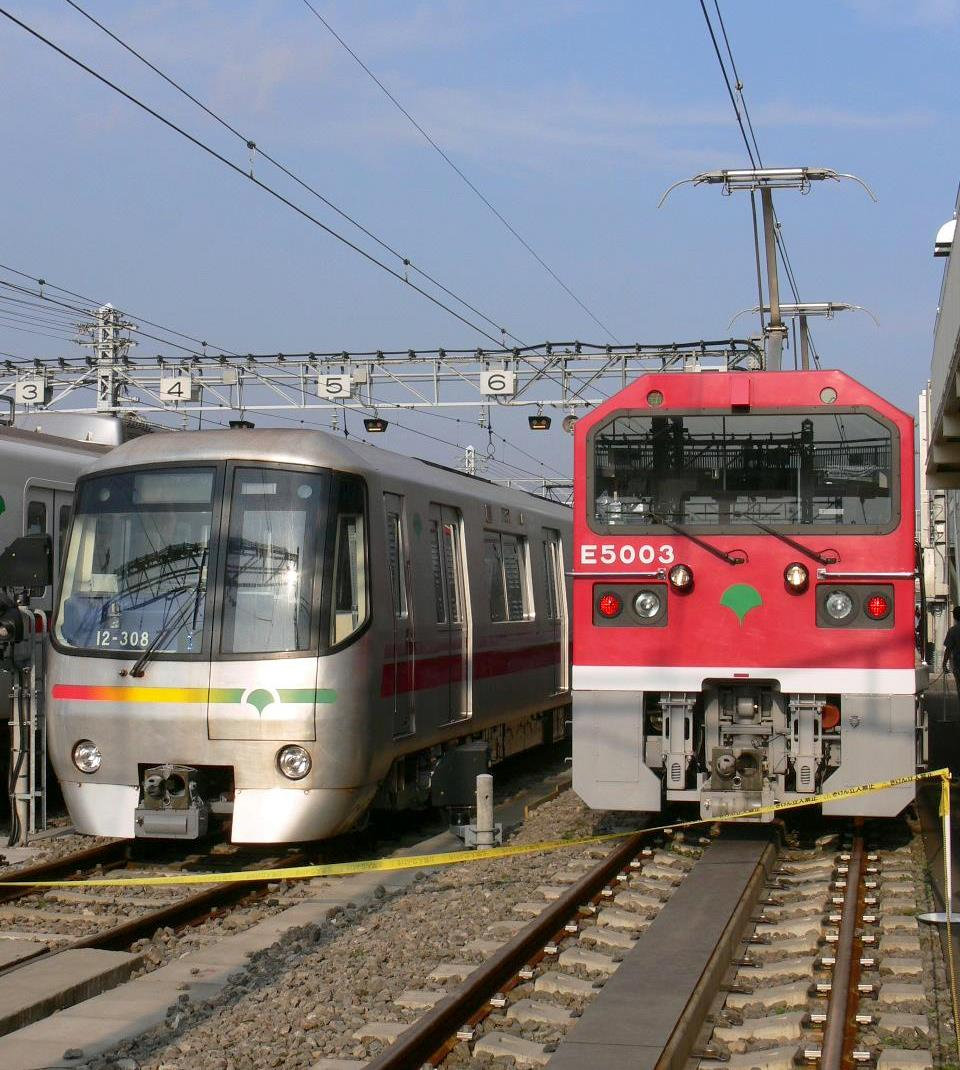
A 12-000 series EMU (left) and a class E5000 electric locomotive (right). The class E5000 locomotive is used to haul 12-000 series units to Magome depot for major overhauls.
