= Tochōmae Station =

Metro station in Tokyo, Japan

Coordinates: 35.6907°N 139.6926°E

Tochōmae Station 都庁前駅

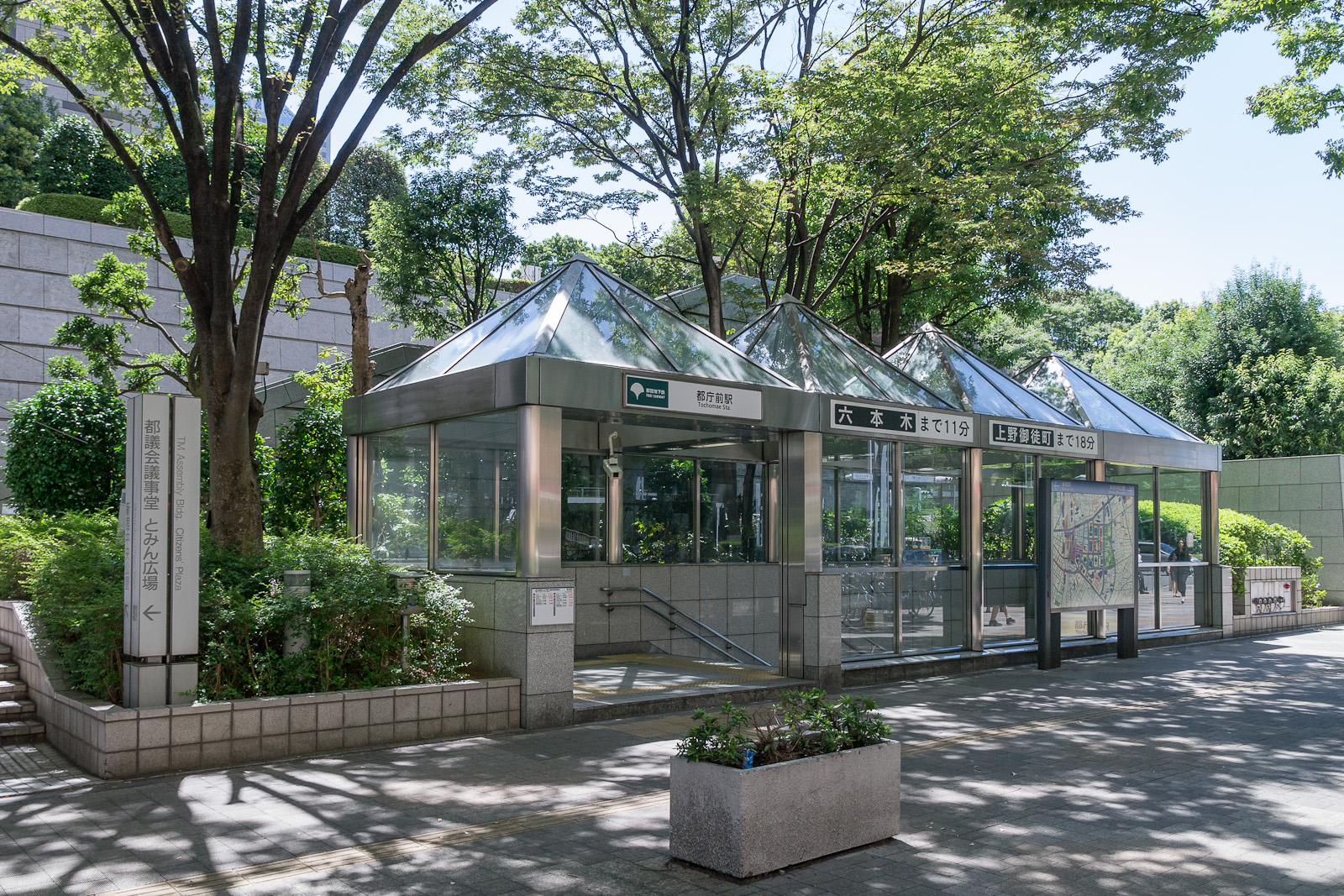
- Exit A4, September 2012

General information
- Location: 2-8-1 Nishi-Shinjuku, Shinjuku City, Tokyo （東京都新宿区西新宿2-8-1） Japan
- Operator: Toei Subway
- Line: Ōedo Line
- Platforms: 2 island platforms
- Tracks: 4

Construction
- Structure type: Underground

Other information
- Station code: E-28

History
- Opened: December 19, 1997; 28 years ago

Services
Preceding station	Toei Subway	Following station
Terminus	Ōedo Line (Platforms 2 and 3)	Shinjuku-nishiguchi towards Hikarigaoka
Nishi-shinjuku-gochōme towards Hikarigaoka	Ōedo Line (Platforms 1 and 4)	Shinjuku towards Tochōmae
Location
- Location within Tokyo Yamanote Loop Location within Tokyo wards area Location within Japan

Tochōmae Station (都庁前駅, Tochōmae-eki; Metropolitan Government Station) is a subway station on the Toei Ōedo Line in Shinjuku, Tokyo, Japan, operated by the Tokyo subway operator Toei Subway. The name of this station suggests its location in front of the Tokyo Metropolitan Government Building, and it is the nearest station to that complex.

Unusually, the station is both a terminus and a through station on the same line. Inbound trains pass through the station, travel south to complete a counterclockwise loop around central Tokyo, and terminate at Tochōmae. Outbound trains do the opposite, departing northbound from Tochōmae, traveling clockwise and eventually passing through the station again on the way out. Consequently, passengers may need to transfer from the Ōedo line to the Ōedo line at this station.

== Lines ==
Tochōmae Station is served by the Toei Ōedo Line, and is numbered "E-28".

== Station layout ==
The station consists of two island platforms on the 3rd basement ("3BF") level, serving four tracks. There are seven exits from the station, numbered A1 to A7.

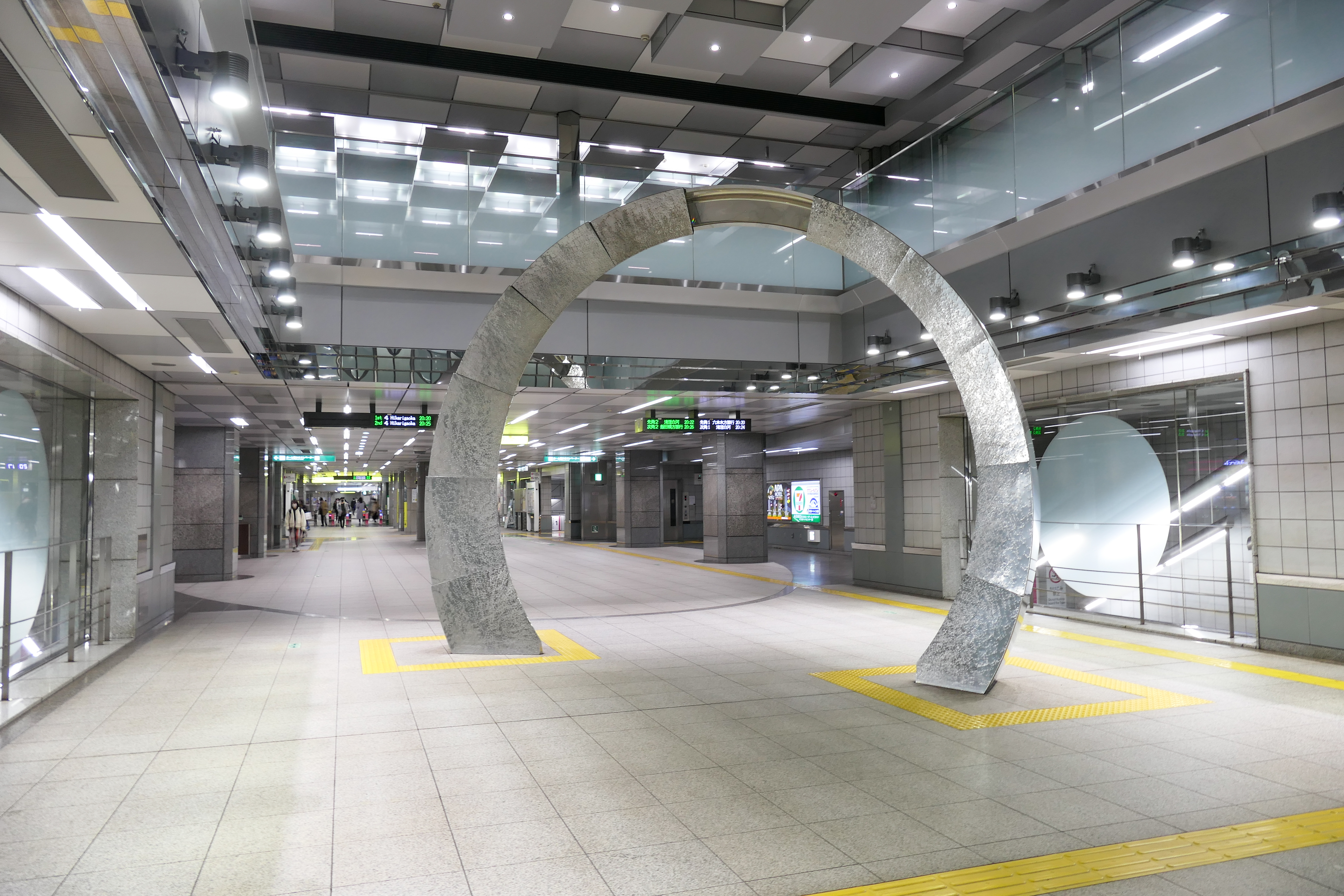
Concourse sculpture

=== Platforms ===
1	Ōedo Line	from Hikarigaoka for Roppongi, Daimon
2	Ōedo Line	Starting services for Iidabashi and Ryōgoku
3	Ōedo Line	Terminating trains from Iidabashi
4	Ōedo Line	from Roppongi for Nerima and Hikarigaoka

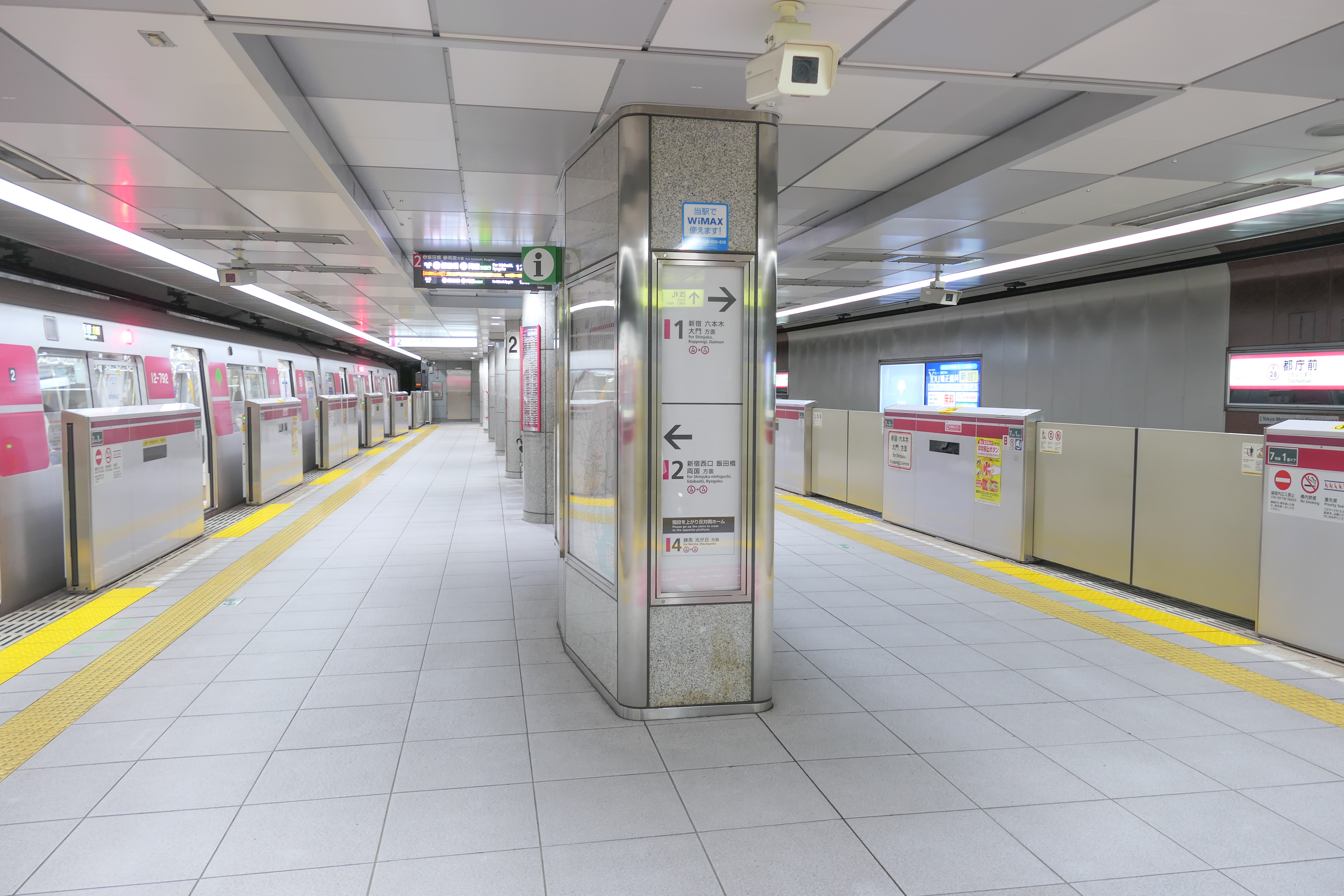
Platforms 1 and 2 in 2022

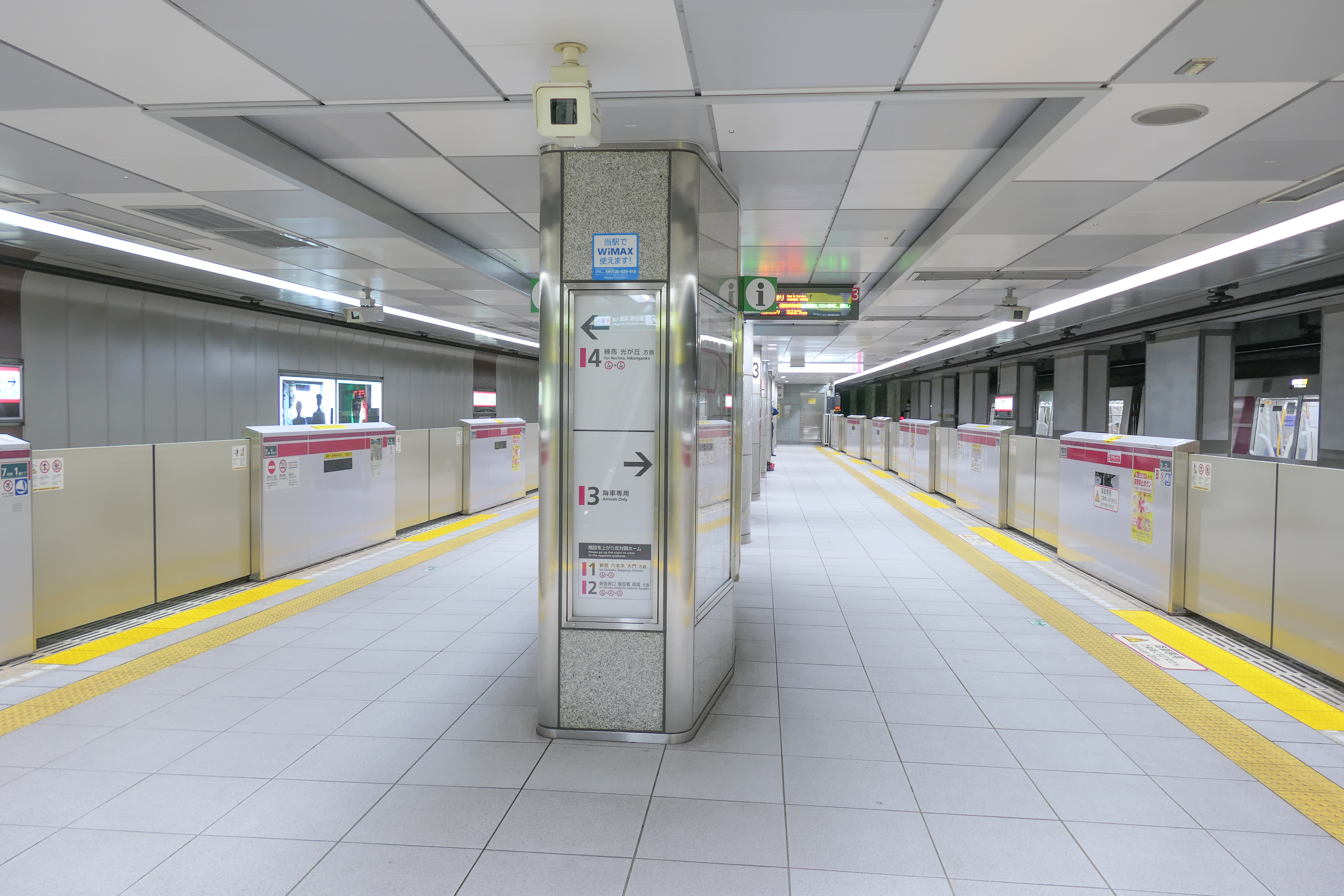
Platforms 3 and 4 in 2022

Track diagram of the station. "H" stands for Hikarigaoka, "I" stands for Iidabashi, and "R" stands for Roppongi.

== History ==
The station began construction on August 28, 1990, and opened on December 19, 1997.

The temporary name before its opening was "Nishi-Shinjuku". The name "Nishi-Shinjuku" is currently used as the name of a station on the Marunouchi Line, and is also part of the name of a station on the Oedo Line called "Nishi-Shinjuku-Go-Chome".

The station was constructed using the cut-and-cover method, with a three-level underground structure, a construction length of 443 m, an average excavation width of 32.7 m (20.2 m - 36.4 m), an average excavation depth of 21.8 m (20.6 m - 28.7 m), a road surface covering of 14,500m2, and an excavated soil volume of 284,000m3, making it a large-scale project.

The siding section near Hikarigaoka Station was constructed at the same time as the shield excavation between Tochomae Station and Nishi-Shinjuku 5-Chome, which is a separate construction area from the station excavation work, and 123 m of the siding was constructed using a shield machine.

== Surrounding area ==
- Nishi-shinjuku Station (Tokyo Metro Marunouchi Line)
- Shinjuku Central Park
- Kogakuin University
- Tokyo Medical University Hospital

=== Office buildings ===
- Tokyo Metropolitan Government Building
- Shinjuku Mitsui Building
- Shinjuku Sumitomo Building
- Shinjuku Center Building
- Shinjuku Monolith Building
- Shinjuku NS Building

=== Hotels ===
- Keio Plaza Hotel
- Hyatt Regency Tokyo
- Hilton Tokyo
- Washington Hotel
- The Knot Tokyo Shinjuku
