= Hikarigaoka Station =

Metro station in Tokyo, Japan

Coordinates: 35.7578°N 139.6293°E

Hikarigaoka Station 光が丘駅

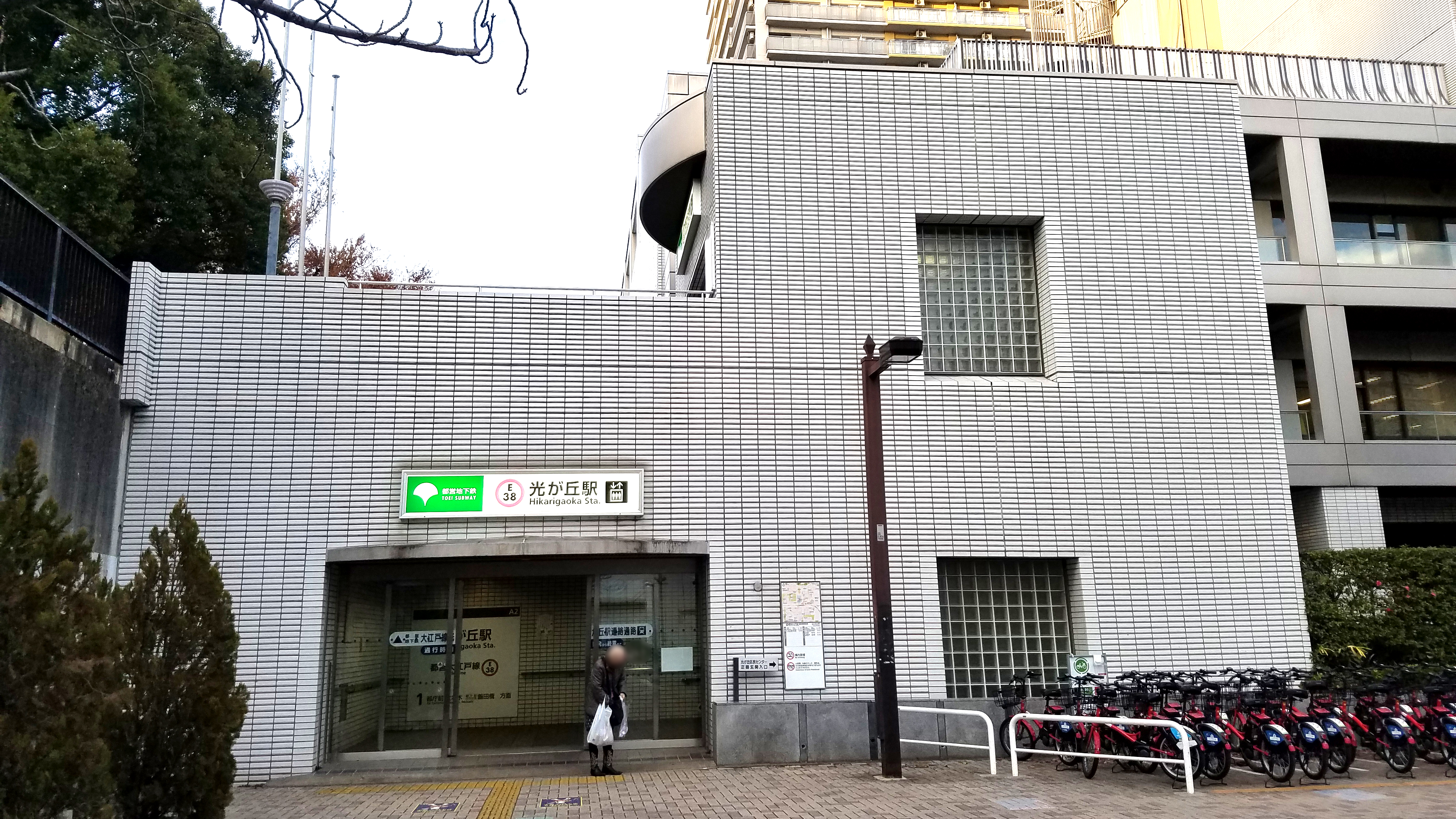
- Entrance A2

General information
- Location: 2-9-5 Hikarigaoka, Nerima City, Tokyo; Japan
- Operator: Toei Subway
- Line: Ōedo Line
- Platforms: 1 island platform
- Tracks: 2
- Connections: Bus stop

Construction
- Structure type: Underground
- Depth: 11.9 m (39 ft)

Other information
- Station code: E-38
- Website: Official website

History
- Opened: 10 December 1991; 34 years ago

Passengers
- FY2011: 56,529 daily

Services
Preceding station	Toei Subway	Following station
Terminus	Ōedo Line	Nerima-kasugachō towards Tochōmae
Location
- Location within Special wards of Tokyo Location within Tokyo Bay and Bōsō Peninsula Location within Tokyo Location within Japan

Hikarigaoka Station (光が丘駅, Hikarigaoka-eki) is a subway station on the Toei Ōedo Line in Nerima, Tokyo, Japan, operated by Tokyo subway operator Toei Subway.

== Lines ==
Hikarigaoka Station is the terminus of the Toei Ōedo Line. It is numbered E-38.

== Station layout ==
The station is the westernmost of all Toei stations, and, at a depth of 11.9 m (39 ft) below ground level, the platform is the closest to the surface of all the Ōedo Line stations. There are five exits from the station, labelled A1 through to A5.

=== Platforms ===
The station has an island platform with two tracks.

1	Ōedo Line	for Tochōmae, Roppongi, and Daimon
2	Ōedo Line	Alighting only

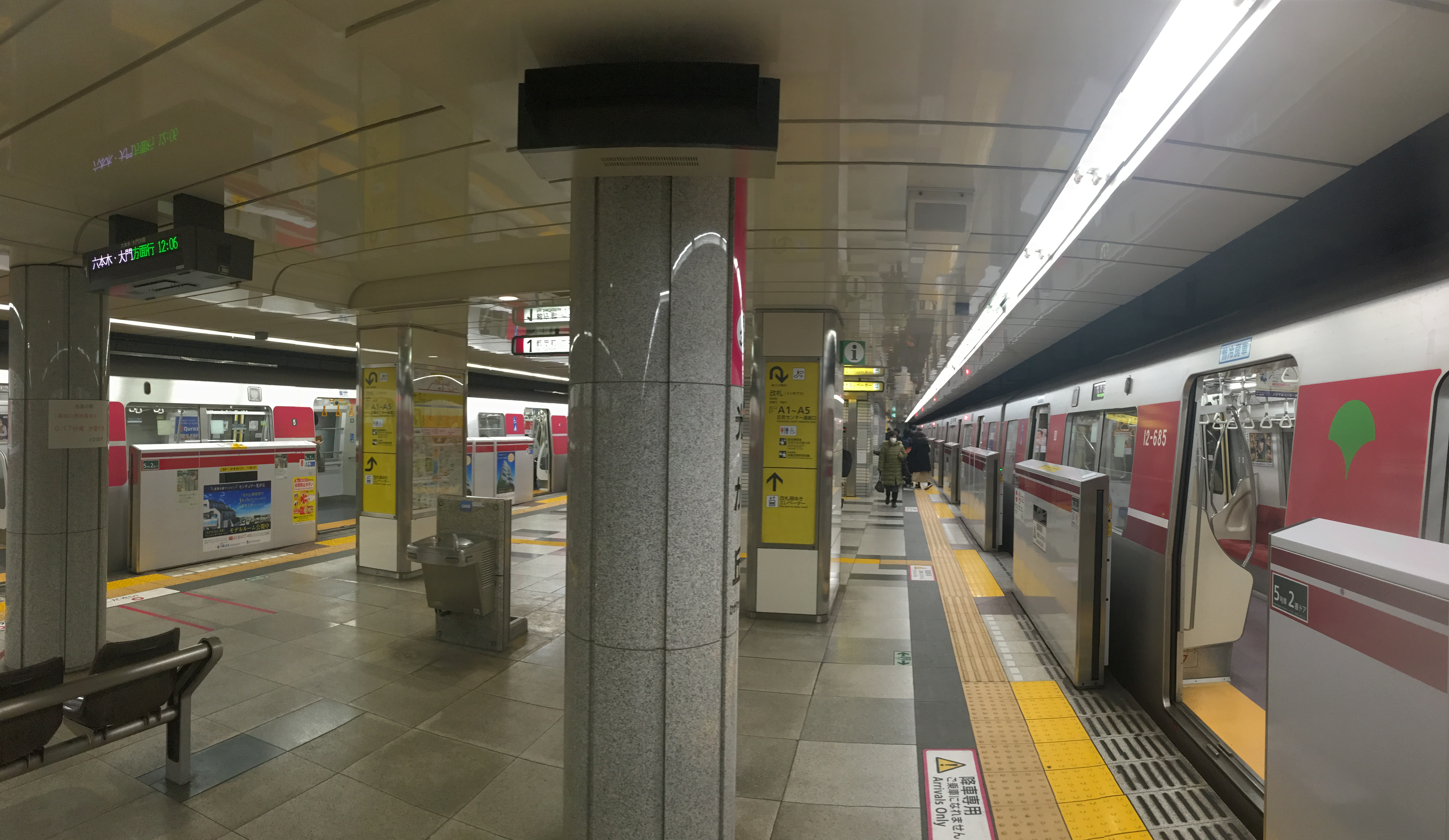
The platforms in January 2022

== History ==
Hikarigaoka Station opened on 10 December 1991.

== Passenger statistics ==
In fiscal 2011, the station was used by an average of 56,529 passengers (28,347 boarding, 28,182 exiting) daily. Below is a table of the passenger statistics of the station beginning with 1991, the year the station entered service.

Year	Passengers	Source
1991	7,982	
1992	9,019	
1993	10,027	
1994	11,025	
1995	11,303	
1996	11,540	
1997	13,501	
1998	19,545	
1999	20,689	
2000	22,285	
2001	23,975	
2002	25,030	
2003	26,098	
2004	26,668	
2005	27,230	
2006	28,041	
2007	29,251	
2008	29,286	
2009	28,706	
2010	28,468	
2011	28,425	

== Surrounding area ==
The station is located towards the centre of the Hikarigaoka housing complex and is located in the vicinity of the large Hikarigaoka IMA shopping centre. Hikarigaoka itself is located at the northern point of Nerima, Tokyo near the border with Itabashi, Tokyo and Wakō, Saitama. Bus services from this station are operated by Kokusaikōgyō Bus and Seibu Bus. A spur of National Route 443 is routed above the station.

== Cultural references ==
The station and other parts of the Toei Ōedo Line are referenced in the Digimon Adventure franchise.

The station is also seen in the beginning of a music video by Hoshimachi Suisei.

== See also ==
- List of railway stations in Japan
