= Shiomi =

Shiomi may refer to:

- Shiomi (surname), a Japanese surname
- Shiomi, Tokyo, a district in Kōtō, Tokyo, Japan
- Mount Shiomi, a mountain of the Akaishi Mountains, Japan
- Shiomi Station (disambiguation), multiple railway stations in Japan
- Outrage Girl Shiomi, a manga series written and illustrated by Kazurou Inoue
