= Etchūjima Station =

Railway station in Tokyo, Japan

JE03 Etchūjima Station 越中島駅
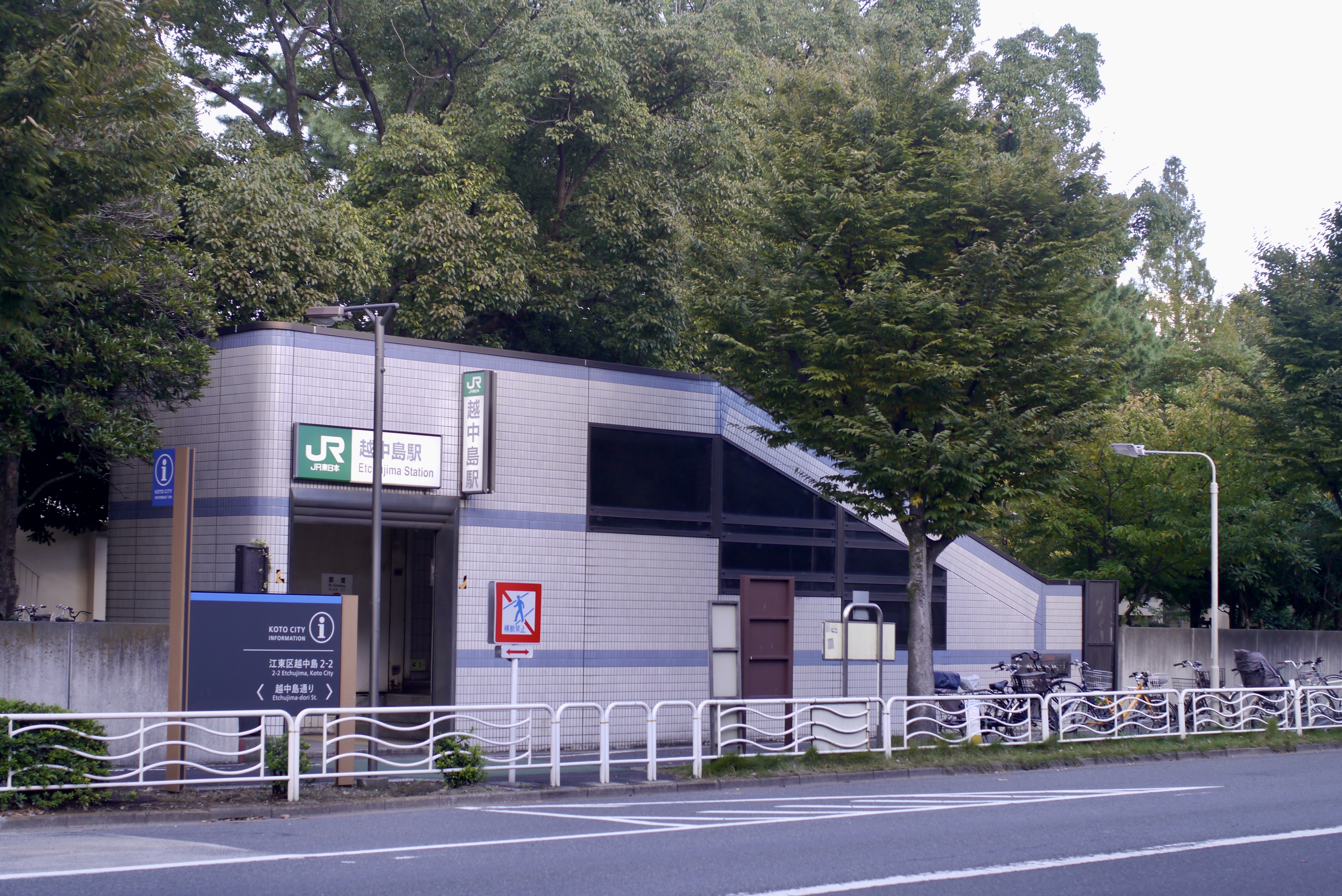
- Surface entrance 1 in October 2020

General information
- Location: 2 Etchūjima; Kōtō, Tokyo; Japan
- Coordinates: 35°40′05″N 139°47′34″E
- Operator: JR East
- Line: Keiyō Line
- Distance: 2.8 km (1.7 mi) from Tokyo
- Platforms: 1 island platform
- Tracks: 2

Construction
- Structure type: Underground
- Accessible: Yes

Other information
- Status: Staffed (part-time)
- Station code: JE03

History
- Opened: 10 March 1990

Passengers
- FY2024: 5,440 daily

Services
| Preceding station | JR East | Following station |
|---|---|---|
| Hatchōbori JE02 towards Tokyo | Keiyō Line Local | Shiomi JE04 towards Soga |
| Hatchōbori JE02 towards Tokyo | Musashino Line Keiyō Line through-service | Shiomi JE04 towards Fuchūhommachi |
Location
- Location within Tokyo Keiyo area Location within Tokyo wards area Location within Japan

Etchūjima Station (Japanese: 越中島駅, Hepburn: Etchūjima-eki) is a railway station on the Keiyō Line in Kōtō, Tokyo, Japan, operated by the East Japan Railway Company (JR East).

== Lines ==
Etchūjima Station is served by the Keiyō Line between Tokyo and Soga, and is located 2.8 kilometres (1.7 mi) from the western terminus of the line at Tokyo. Only all-stations train stops at this station.

== Station layout ==
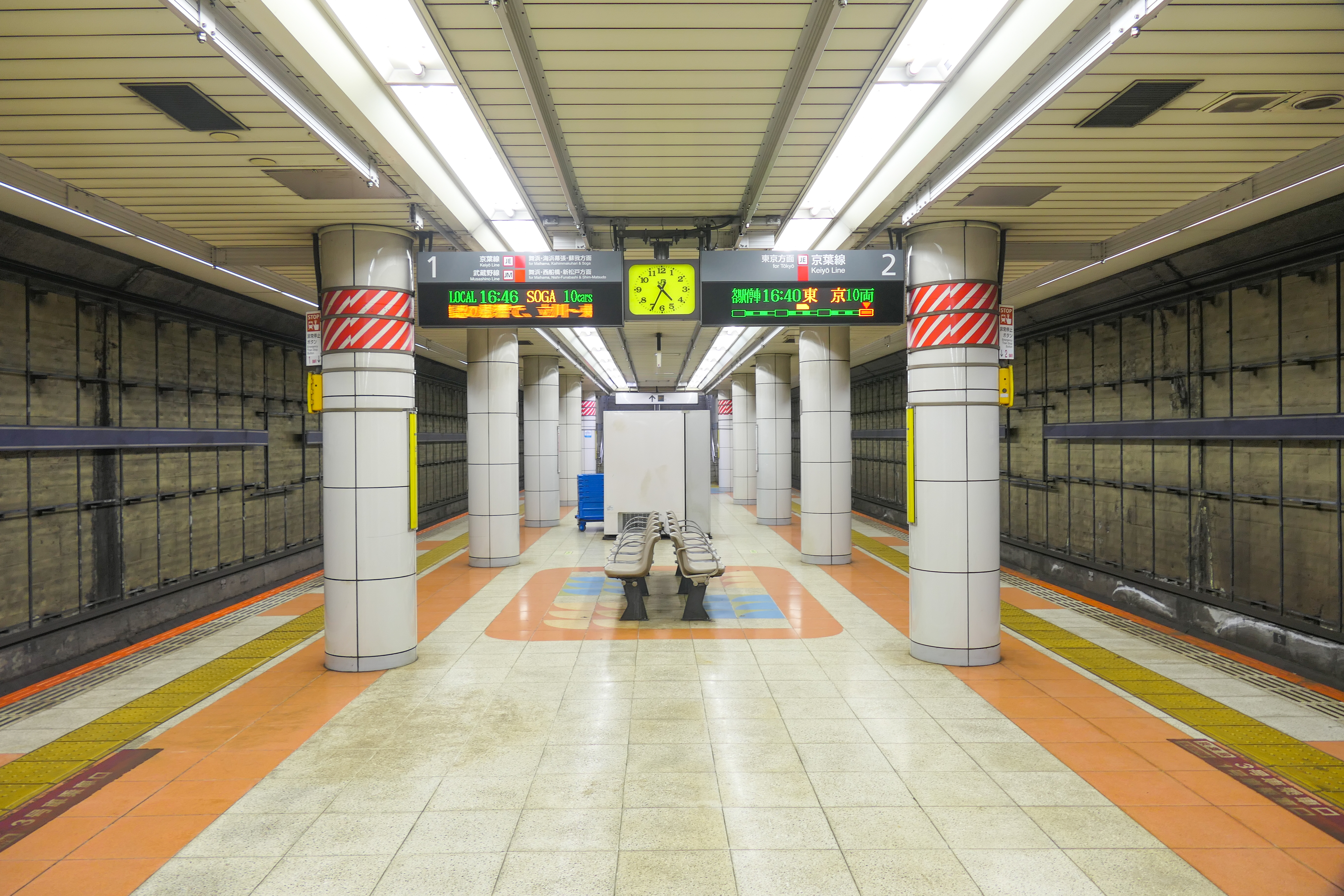
Station platform, April 2023

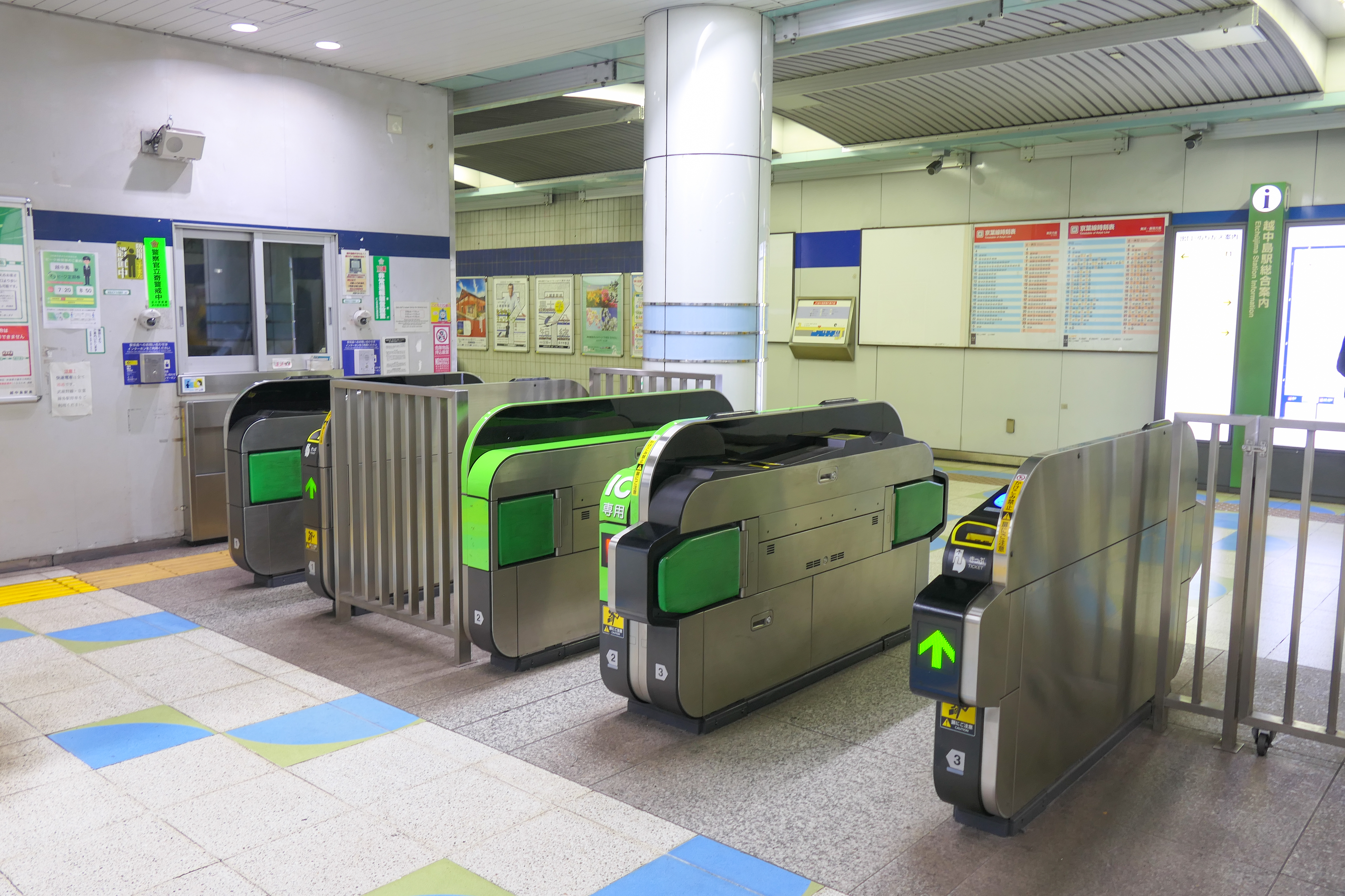
Ticket gates, April 2023

The station is located underground, with the station concourse on the 1st basement level and the platforms on the 2nd basement level. The station has one island platform serving two tracks.

=== Platforms ===
| 1 | Keiyō Line | for Maihama, Kaihimmakuhari, and Soga |
| 1 | Musashino Line through service | for Nishi-Funabashi and Shim-Matsudo |
| 2 | Keiyō Line | for Tokyo |

== History ==
The station opened on 10 March 1990.

Station numbering was introduced to the JR East platforms in 2016 with Etchūjima being assigned station number JE03.

== Surrounding area ==
=== Other stations ===
- Tsukishima Station (Tokyo Metro Yūrakuchō Line (Y-21) and Toei Ōedo Line (E-16))
- Monzen-Nakachō Station (Tokyo Metro Tōzai Line (T-12) and Toei Ōedo Line (E-15))

=== Business ===
- Tokyo Sports newspaper headquarters
- Sports Nippon newspaper headquarters
- Tonichi Printing headquarters

=== Education ===
- Tokyo University of Marine Science and Technology Etchujima campus
- Shibaura Institute of Technology Toyosu campus
- Tokyo Dai-san Shōgyō High School
- Kōtō Ward Fukagawa Dai-san Junior High School
- Kōtō Ward Etchujima Elementary School

== See also ==
- List of railway stations in Japan
