= Harumi Island Triton Square =

Skyscraper in Japan

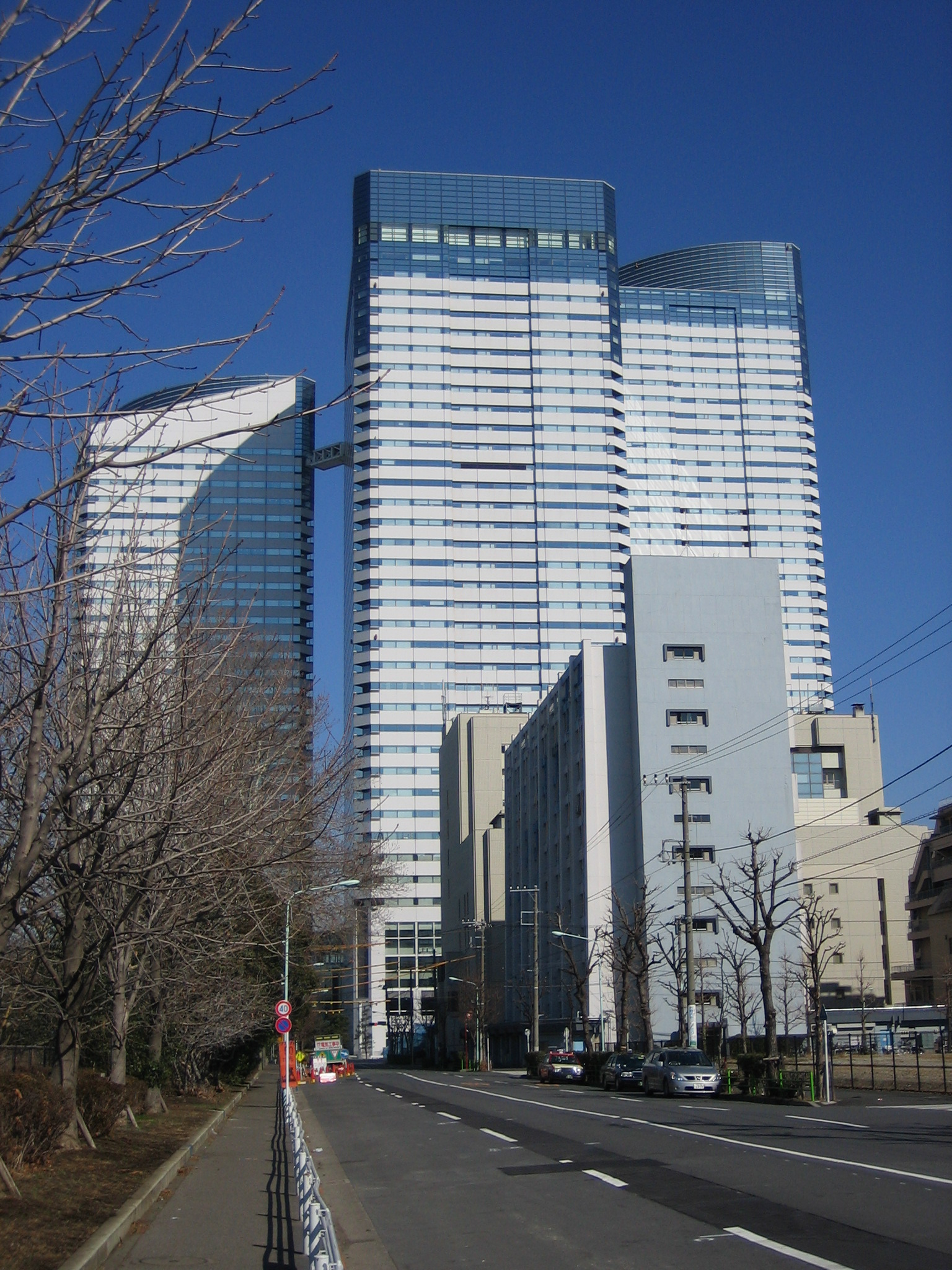
- Interactive map of the Harumi Island Triton Square area

General information
- Status: Completed
- Location: Chūō, Tokyo, Japan
- Coordinates: 35.65751°N 139.78377°E

Harumi Island Triton Square (晴海アイランドトリトンスクエア, Harumi-airando-toriton-sukuea) is high-rise office and residential complex in the Harumi district of Chūō, Tokyo, Japan.

It consists of four towers, one of which is significantly shorter than the others; the three tall towers are the source of the name "Triton", and the total number of four is the source of the name "Square".

Triton Square is located near Kachidoki Station on the Toei Oedo Line and Tsukishima Station on the Tokyo Metro Yurakucho Line.
