= JTSB =

JTSB may refer to:

- Japan Transport Safety Board
- Japan Trustee Services Bank
