= Tokyo Cramzy Days =

Tokyo Clumsy Days

Studio album by Saori Atsumi
- Released: March 21, 2007
- Label: Lantis

Tokyo Clumsy Days (東京クラムジーデイズ) is an album by Saori Atsumi. The album contains multiple tracks previously used in anime: "Biidama" is the ending theme to Genshiken, "Mōsukoshi… Mōsukoshi…" is the ending theme to Midori Days, and "Ai" is the opening theme to the Kujibiki♥Unbalance television series.

== Track listing ==
#	English translation	Japanese title		Time
#	English translation	Kanji	Romaji	Time
1.	"True Things"	ほんとのこと	Honto no Koto	3:50
2.	"Love"	あい	Ai	3:38
3.	"On the Radio in the Middle of the Night"	真夜中のラジオ	Mayonaka no Rajio	4:30
4.	"A Little More... A Little More..."	もう少し…もう少し…	Mōsukoshi... Mōsukoshi...	4:18
5.	"Can't See the Blue Sky"	青い空が見えない	Aoi Sora ga Mienai	4:28
6.	"Scab"	かさぶた	Kasabuta	4:30
7.	"Marble"	びいだま	Biidama	4:04
8.	"Love Argument"	恋愛論	Ren'ai Ron	3:28
9.	"I Wrote a Letter to You Because"	君のために手紙を書いた	Kimi no Tame ni Tegami o Kaita	4:06
10.	"If Tomorrow"	明日になれば	Ashita ni Nareba	5:22
11.	"We're So Childish"	幼い僕ら	Osanai Bokura	4:36
12.	"I See God"	神様がみてる	Kami-sama ga Miteru	4:33
