= Shiomi Station =

Shiomi Station is the name of two train stations in Japan:

- Shiomi Station (Hokkaido) (汐見駅)
- Shiomi Station (Tokyo) (潮見駅)
