= Saori Atsumi =

Japanese singer-songwriter

Saori Atsumi アツミ サオリ
- Born: 渥美 佐織 (Atsumi Saori); February 2, 1989 (age 37); Iwata, Shizuoka, Japan
- Genres: Japanese pop Indie music
- Occupations: Singer, songwriter
- Instruments: Guitar, Vocals
- Years active: 1999–2007; 2010–present
- Labels: Lantis (Major); B-Gram Records (Independent)
- Website: saoriatsumi.jimdosite.com

Saori Atsumi (アツミ サオリ, Atsumi Saori) is a Japanese singer-songwriter.

As of August 2013, she has released nine singles and three albums. Her second major album, Miraculous Happening (ミラキュラスハプニング) was released on September 25, 2013.

== Personal life ==
Saori Atsumi was born and raised in Iwata, Shizuoka. When she was young, her mother used to sing lullabies to her and use the organ during her kindergarten lessons; this had a lot of influence for her interest in music. She admired Tsuyoshi Nagabuchi and decided to take up the guitar during middle school. During high school, she started to write music.

She designed the cover of her self-produced single. Her official site features the cover of her latest single, Namida no Riyū. This became evident when the singer participated in a charity event and contributed a tote bag featuring her artwork on it.

== Career ==
Before her commercial debut, she often did live in-house performances at different places such as Apia in Shibuya, Tokyo as well in-store performances at various Tower Records stores.

She self-produced a cassette that contains two songs in October 1999 titled Mayonaka no Radio. The title track was later included in her first self-produced CD titled Tasogare Ryūseigun with an acoustic version of it. The CD was released on July 27, 2002.

Then she officially debuted with her single, "Mōsukoshi… Mōsukoshi…" as the ending theme of Midori Days in 2004. Later in November, she released her second major single, "Bīdama". The title track became the ending theme for the anime series Genshiken. The single contains a hidden track titled Nagare Hoshi (流れ星). It is a cover version of a song by Magokoro Brothers.

On Christmas Day that year, she also released her first album under an independent label, B-gram Records, titled Anata to Watashi to Kimi to Boku. Her second album Sora Iro Nostalgie was released in April 2006. Her third major single, "Ai", was released, and the title track was opening theme for the 2006 remake of the series Kujibiki Unbalance. It also contained her cover of Kazuyoshi Saito's Tatoeba Kimi no Koto

It was not until 2007 that she released her first major album. Tokyo Cramzy Days, which was released on March 21, also contains a few tracks from her other major singles as well as her other independent albums. Except for her three singles, her albums never went on the Oricon charts.

Her latest releases "Suki ni Naritai" and "Namida no Riyū" are exclusively available on iTunes Music Store. They are released under her independent label. Her first digital single, "Aoi Sora ga Mienai" was released on April 11, 2006, and was only available in Indie Rise. The single is from her second independent album, Sora Iro no Nostalgie.

She does live in-house performances as well as being a part of the Tote as Canvas Charity Event with Masao Kida, Maroon 5 along with other celebrities.

== Collaborations ==
Besides writing and performing her own songs, she has composed and written songs for other artistes. She wrote lyrics for Uso (嘘; Lie) in Sayuri Iwata's Sayuri Iwata Best+ album. She also composed the music for Tears and January 28 ~two of us~ in Aya Kamiki's independent mini album, Rock On.

== Discography ==
=== Singles ===
- Mōsukoshi… Mōsukoshi… (もう少し…もう少し…), released May 26, 2004.
- Bīdama (びいだま), released November 26, 2004.
- Ai (あい), released October 25, 2006.
- Yume'iro no Koi (夢色の恋), released August 11, 2010.

=== Albums ===
- Tokyo Cramzy Days, released March 21, 2007.
- Miraculous Happening (ミラキュラスハプニング), released on September 25, 2013.

=== Albums on independent labels ===
- Anata to Watashi to Kimi to Boku (アナタとわたしと君と僕), released December 25, 2004.
- Sora Iro Nostalgie (空色ノスタルジー), released April 26, 2006.

=== Digital singles ===
- Aoi Sora ga Mienai (青い空が見えない)
- Suki ni Naritai (好きになりたい)
- Namida no Riyū (涙の理由)
- Ishin Denshin (以心伝心)
- Bansōkō (絆創膏)

=== Self-produced CDs ===
- Mayonaka no Radio (真夜中のラジオ)
- Tasogare Ryūseigun (黄昏流星群)

=== Compilations ===
- Neo Generation Vol.1
- Tears...for truth
- Yunosagi Relations
- Ika Love
