= Shintomichō Station =

Metro station in Chuo, Tokyo, Japan

Coordinates: 35°40′13.6488″N 139°46′25.4028″E

Shintomicho Station 新富町駅

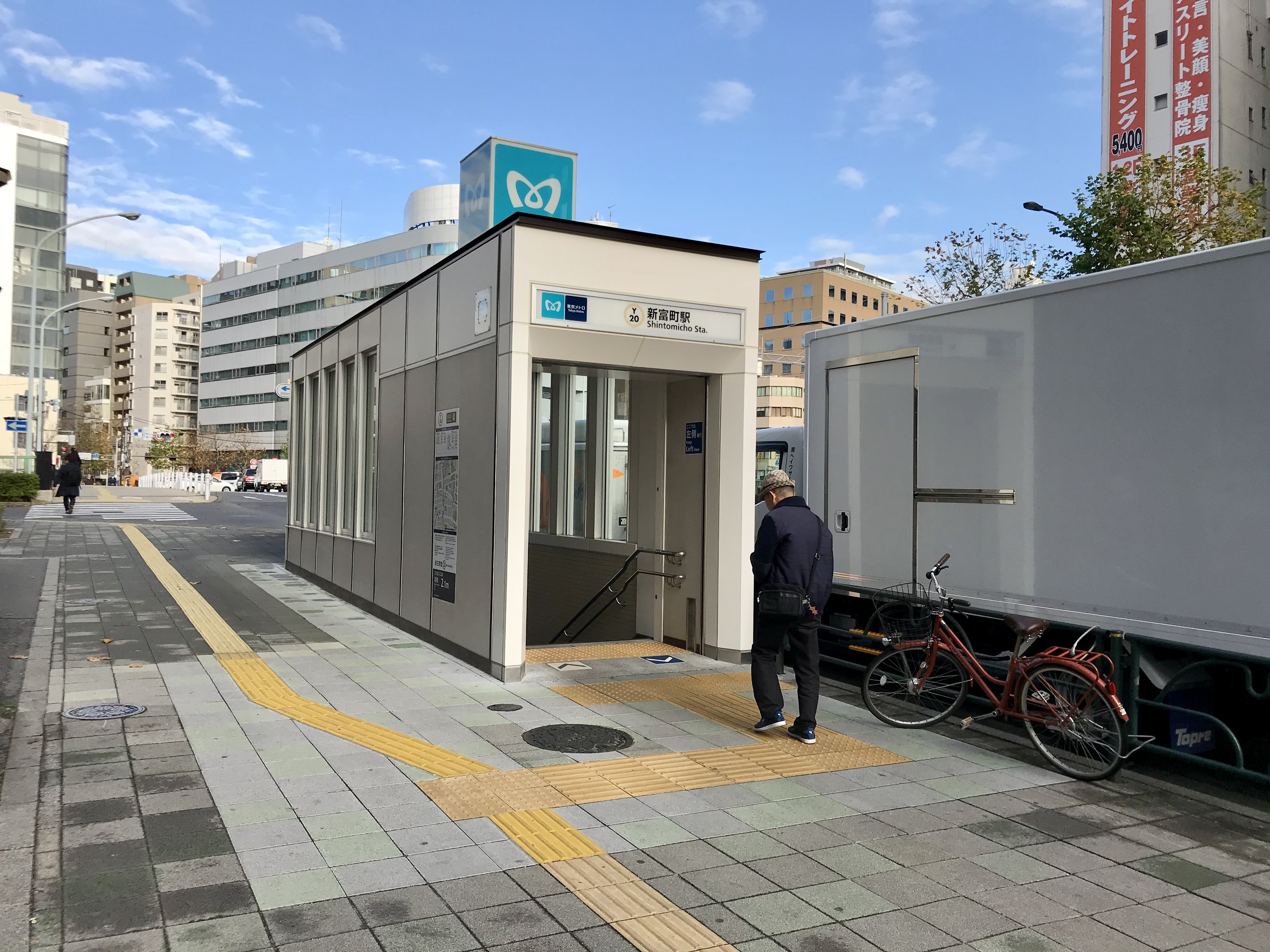
- Exit4 in December 2019

General information
- Location: 1-1-1 Tsukiji, Chūō City, Tokyo （東京都中央区築地1-1-1） Japan
- Operator: Tokyo Metro
- Line: Yūrakuchō Line
- Platforms: 2 side platforms
- Tracks: 2
- Connections: Tsukiji

Construction
- Structure type: Underground

Other information
- Station code: Y-20

History
- Opened: 27 March 1980; 46 years ago

Services
Preceding station	Tokyo Metro	Following station
Ginza-itchōme towards Wakoshi	Yūrakuchō Line	Tsukishima towards Shin-kiba
Location
- Location within Tokyo Yamanote Loop Location within Tokyo wards area Location within Japan

Shintomichō Station (新富町駅, Shintomichō-eki) is a subway station on the Tokyo Metro Yūrakuchō Line in Chūō, Tokyo, Japan, operated by Tokyo Metro. Its station number is Y-20.

== Line ==
Shintomichō Station is served by the Tokyo Metro Yurakucho Line from Wakōshi in Saitama Prefecture to Shin-Kiba in south-east Tokyo. Located between Ginza-itchōme and Tsukishima, it is 22.4 km from Wakōshi.

== Station layout ==
The station consists of two side platforms serving two tracks. Chest-high platform edge doors were installed in April 2013.

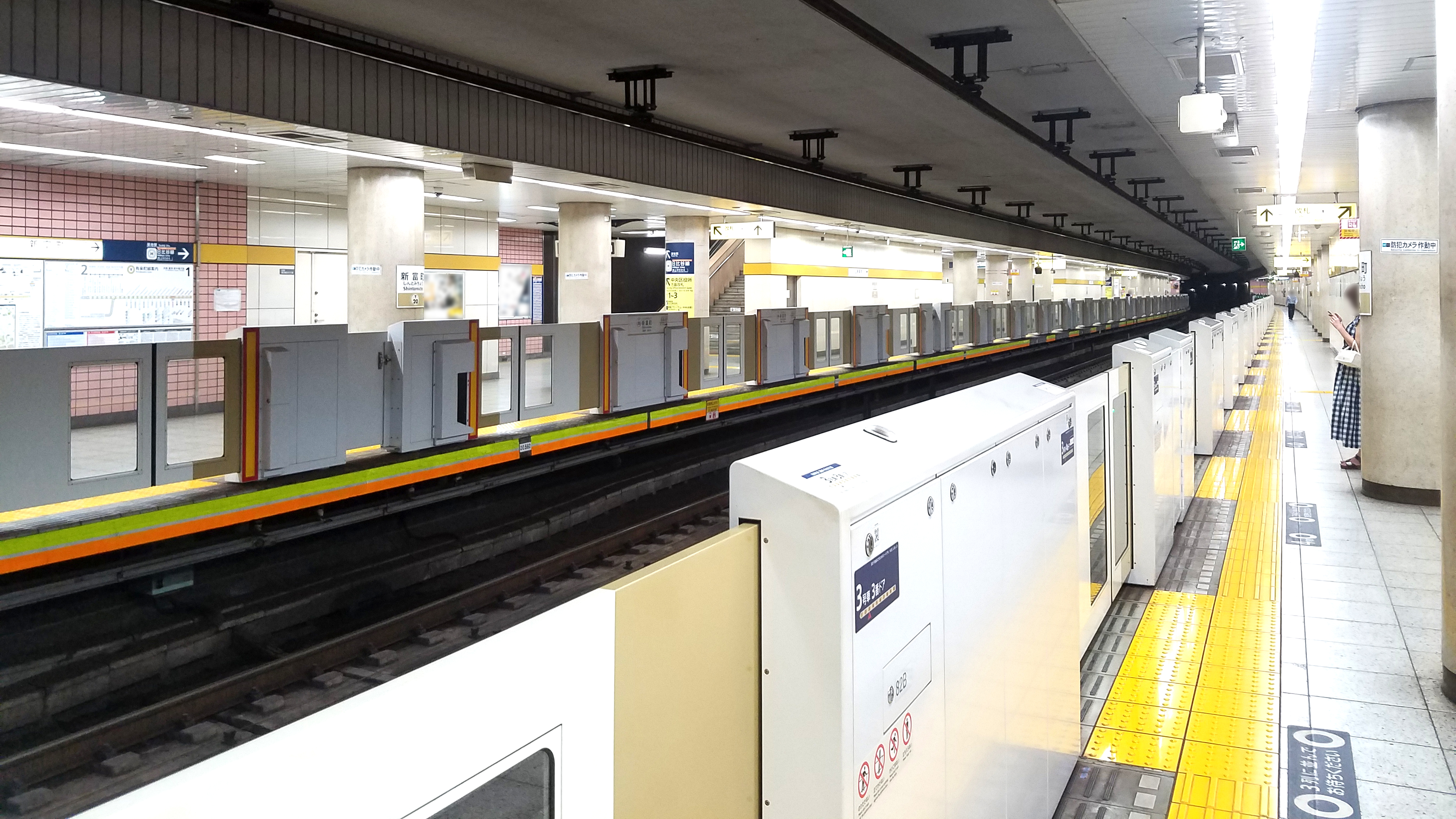
View of the platforms in August 2020

=== Platforms ===
1	Yūrakuchō Line	for Shin-Kiba
2	Yūrakuchō Line	for Ikebukuro and Wakōshi; Tobu Tojo Line for Shinrinkōen; Seibu Ikebukuro Line for Hannō

== History ==
The station was opened on 27 March 1980 by the Teito Rapid Transit Authority (TRTA).

== Surrounding area ==
- Tsukiji Station ( Tokyo Metro Hibiya Line) (approximately 2 minutes walk)
- Chuo Ward Office
- Tsukiji Police Station
- Tsukiji fish market
- St. Luke's International Hospital
- St. Luke's College of Nursing
- Roman Catholic Church of St. Joseph
- Tsukiji Hongan-ji
- Sumida River
