= Trust & Custody Services Bank =

Japanese bank

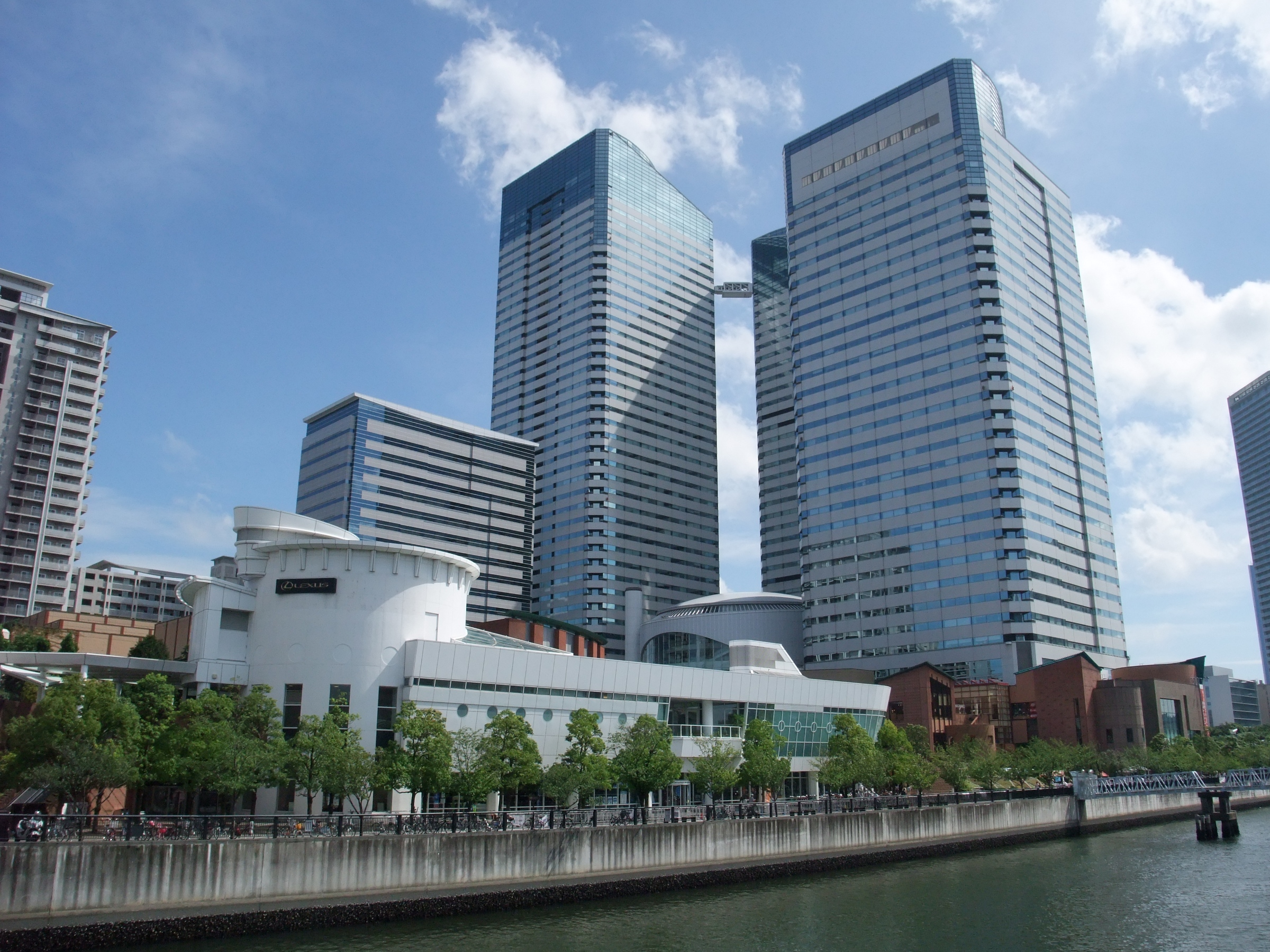
Offices in Tokyo

Trust & Custody Services Bank, Ltd. (資産管理サービス信託銀行株式会社, Shisan Kanri Service Shintaku Ginko Kabushiki Gaisha) is a Japanese bank that provides asset administration for banks and insurance companies. As of August 2017, it had 50 trillion yen in capital. In July 2020 Trust & Custody Services Bank merged with the Japan Trustee Services Bank to form Custody Bank of Japan.

== History ==
The company was established in January 2001 through an accord of Mizuho Trust & Banking Co,. Ltd., The Dai-Ichi Kangyo Bank, Ltd., The Fuji Bank, Ltd., The Industrial Bank of Japan, Ltd., Asahi Mutual Life Insurance Company, The Dai-ichi Mutual Life Insurance Company, Fukoku Mutual Life Insurance Company, and Yasuda Mutual Life Insurance Company. By 2006 the bank had about $900 billion in assets under management.
