= Kazurou Inoue =

Japanese manga artist (born 1972)

Kazurou Inoue (井上 和郎, Inoue Kazurō; born May 1, 1972) is a Japanese manga artist from Sano, Tochigi Prefecture. He received recognition for his manga Dream Security Mao (Dream Security マオ) at the 40th Rookie Comic Awards. After training under Kazuhiro Fujita, he published Heat Wave in Shōnen Sunday Super in 2001. He is most known for Midori Days, which was adapted into a 13-episode anime series by Pierrot.

== Works ==
- Heat Wave (2001, serialized in Shōnen Sunday Super, Shogakukan)
- Midori Days (2002–2004, serialized in Weekly Shōnen Sunday, Shogakukan)
- Ai Kora (2005–2008, serialized in Weekly Shōnen Sunday, Shogakukan)
- Haru Ranman! (2007, one-shot published in Young Animal, Hakusensha)
- Aoi Destruction (2007, collection of short stories, Shogakukan)
- Undead (2008, serialized in Big Comic Spirits, Shogakukan)
- Ane Comi (2009-2012, serialized in Young Animal Island, Hakusensha)
- Mahō no Iroha! (2009-2012, serialized in Shōnen Sunday Super, Shogakukan)
- Full-Scratch Eiji
- Koshoten Yakou Funsenki
- Otone no Naisho
- Maria-san wa Toumei Shoujo (Maria-san the Invisible Girl, 2014)
- Outrage Girl Shiomi (2016–2018, serialized in Shōnen Sunday Super, Shogakukan)
