= Japan Trustee Services Bank =

Japanese trust bank

Japan Trustee Services Bank, Ltd. 日本トラスティ・サービス信託銀行株式会社
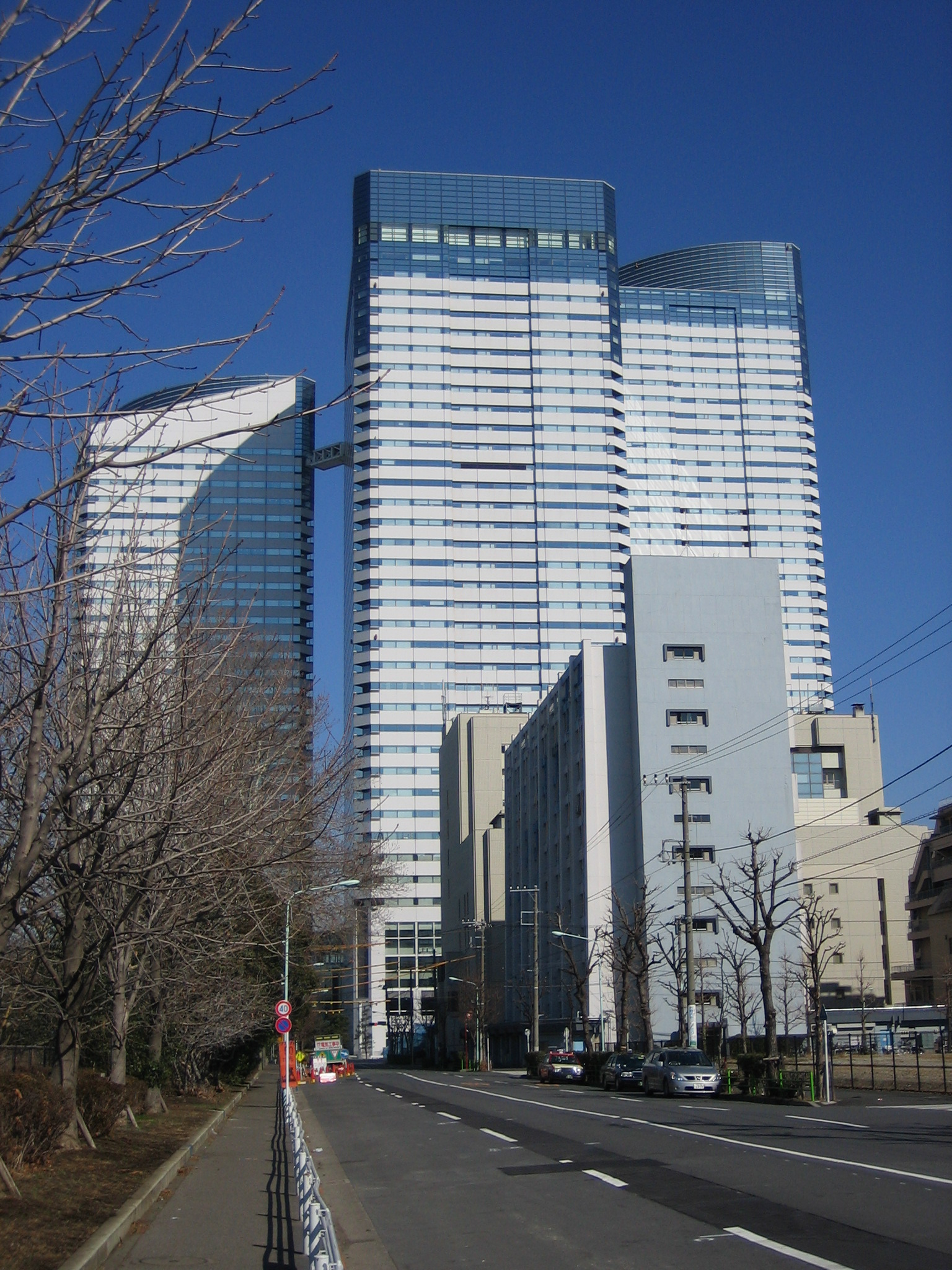
- Headquarters at Harumi Island Triton Square, Tokyo
- Company type: Private KK
- Industry: Trustee banking services
- Founded: June 20, 2000; 25 years ago
- Defunct: July 27, 2020; 5 years ago
- Successor: Custody Bank of Japan
- Headquarters: Chuo, Tokyo, Japan
- Key people: Yasuo Kuwana (President)
- AUM: JPY 203.4 trillion (2014)
- Owners: JTC Holdings (100%)
- Number of employees: 926 (2014)
- Website: www.japantrustee.co.jp

Japan Trustee Services Bank, Ltd. (日本トラスティ・サービス信託銀行株式会社, Nippon Torasuti Sābisu Shintaku Ginkō Kabushiki-gaisha), or JTSB, is a trust bank in Japan.

JTSB is a joint venture between Resona Bank and Sumitomo Mitsui Trust Holdings, and acts as a subcontracted trustee for both banks to hold their customers' assets, which include pension fund and investment trust assets. Its main competitors are The Master Trust Bank of Japan (controlled by Mitsubishi UFJ Financial Group and Nippon Life Insurance) and Trust & Custody Services Bank (controlled by Mizuho Financial Group).

JTSB's SWIFT (ISO 9362) code is JTSBJPJT.

In July 2020 JTSB merged with the Trust & Custody Services Bank to form Custody Bank of Japan.

== History ==
JTSB was established on June 20, 2000, by Daiwa Bank and Sumitomo Trust & Banking Co., Ltd. and began operations on July 25, 2000. Sumitomo Trust transferred part of its trust business and other assets to JTSB in October 2000, and Daiwa followed suit in June 2001. The Mitsui Trust Financial Group invested in JTSB in 2002 and transferred some of its trust operations to JTSB in 2003.

Daiwa merged with Asahi Bank in 2003 to form Resona Bank, and Sumitomo Trust merged with Chuo Mitsui Trust Holdings in April 2011 to form Sumitomo Mitsui Trust Holdings.

In 2014, Toyota announced the establishment of a foundation to support development and environmental protection in the automotive industry, which was to be funded by dividends from a pool of 30 million Toyota shares sold to JTSB for one yen per share.
