= Sora Iro Nostalgie =

Studio album by Saori Atsumi
- Released: April 26, 2006
- Label: B-Gram

Sora Iro Nostalgie^{[a]} (空色ノスタルジー, Sky-blue Nostalgia) is the second album under an independent label by Saori Atsumi.

== Track listing ==
#	English translation	Japanese title		Time
#	English translation	Kanji	Romaji	Time
1.	I Can't See the Blue Sky	青い空が見えない	Aoi Sora ga Mienai	4:28
2.	Under the Stars ~Girl's pop!~	星の下で～Girl's pop!～	Hoshi no Shita de ~Girl's pop!~	3:07
3.	My Little Home	私の小さな家	Watashi no Chiisa na Ie	4:18
4.	When I Wrote A Letter to You	君に手紙を書く時は	Kimi ni Tegami o Kaku Toki wa	3:44
5.	The Future Story	未来のストーリー	Mirai no Story	4:10
6.	The Moon Smiled	月が笑ってる	Tsuki ga Waratteru	4:12
7.	Let's Talk	話をしようよ	Hanashi o Shiyō yo	3:25
8.	Record	レコード	Record	4:13
9.	God is Watching	神様がみてる	Kami-sama ga Miteru	4:36
10.	"Morning Glow"	n/a	n/a	3:04
11.	To my Beloved People	大切な人へ	Taisetsu na Hito e	5:50

== Notes and references ==
a : [sic] ノスタルジー is derived from the French/German word nostalgie, which means nostalgia in English.
