= Tsukiji Station =

Metro station in Tokyo, Japan

Coordinates: 35.6681°N 139.7725°E

Tsukiji Station 築地駅

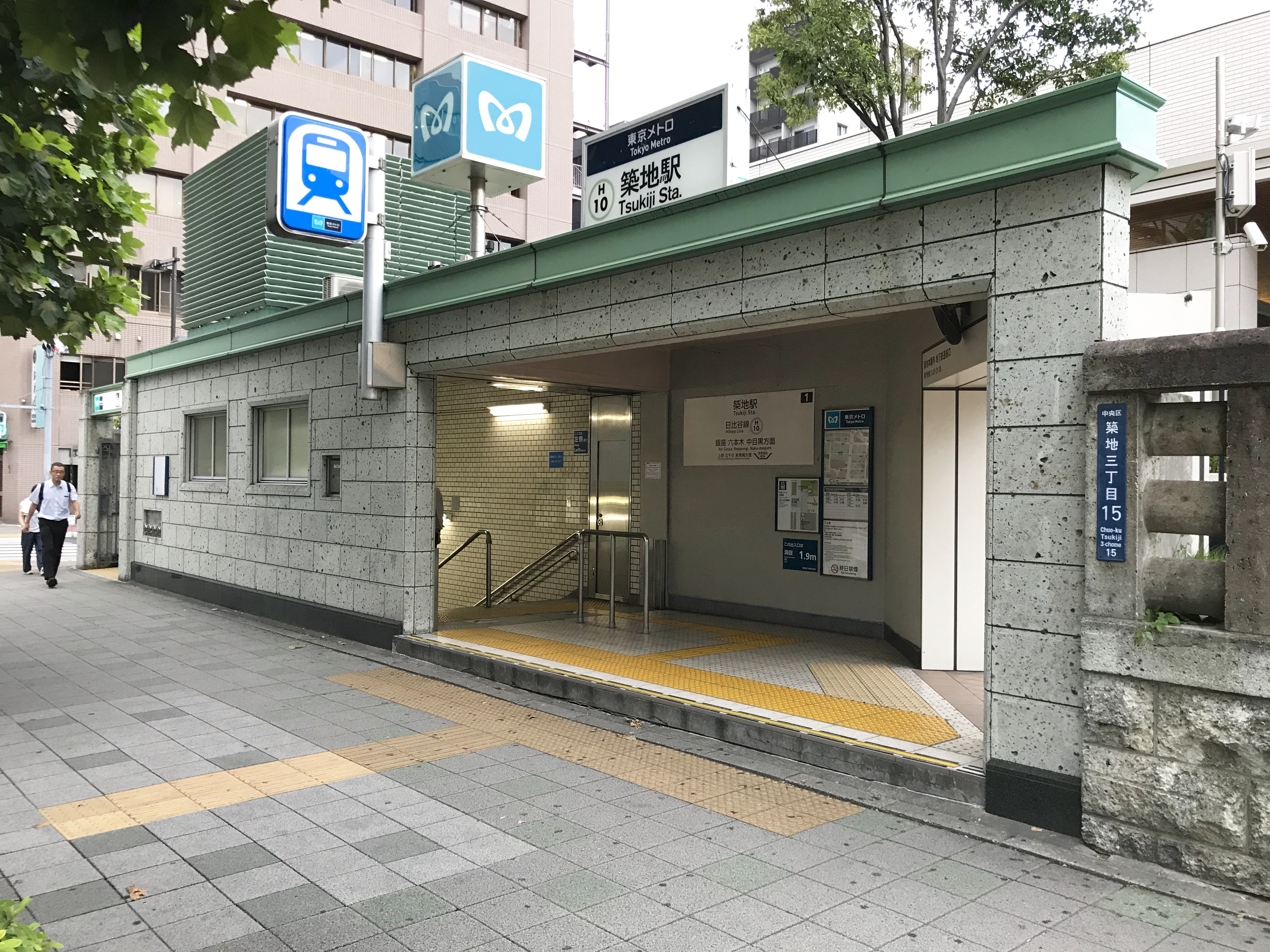
- Exit1, August 2019

General information
- Location: 3-15-1 Tsukiji, Chūō, Tokyo （東京都中央区築地3-15-1） Japan
- Operator: Tokyo Metro
- Line: Hibiya Line
- Connections: Shintomichō

Construction
- Structure type: Underground

Other information
- Station code: H-11

History
- Opened: 28 February 1963; 63 years ago

Services
Preceding station	Tokyo Metro	Following station
Higashi-ginza towards Naka-meguro	Hibiya Line	Hatchōbori towards Kita-Senju
Location
- Location within Tokyo Yamanote Loop Location within Tokyo wards area Location within Japan

Tsukiji Station (築地駅, Tsukiji-eki) is a subway station on the Tokyo Metro Hibiya Line in Tsukiji, Chūō, Tokyo, Japan, operated by the Tokyo subway operator Tokyo Metro.

== Lines ==
Tsukiji Station is served by the Hibiya Line, and is numbered H-11. It is located 10.7 km from the starting point of the line at Kita-Senju.

== Station layout ==
Tsukiji station has a simple side platform arrangement with two tracks. Platform 1 serves southbound trains to Ginza, whilst platform 2 serves northbound trains to Ueno and Kita-Senju.

Access to the station is provided by two sets of entrances and exits, with a total of four points of entry in total. Exits 1 and 2 are on opposite sides of Route 50 at the southern end of the station near the fish market. Exits 3 and 4 are also on opposite sides of the same road but at the northern end of the station.

=== Platforms ===
1	Hibiya Line	for Ginza, Roppongi, and Naka-Meguro
2	Hibiya Line	for Ueno, Kita-Senju; Tobu Skytree Line for Tōbu-Dōbutsu-Kōen; Tobu Nikko Line for Minami-Kurihashi

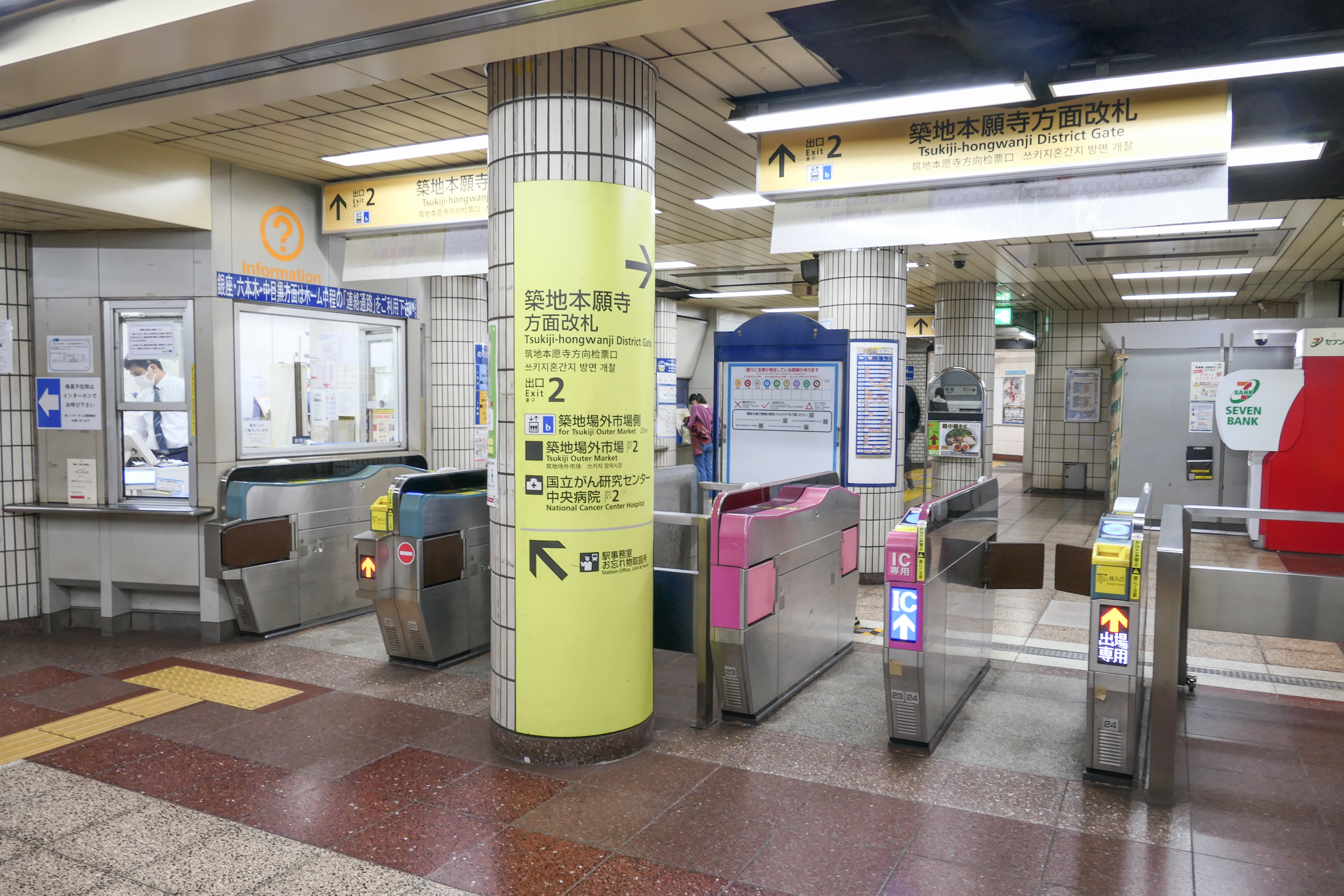
Ticket gates

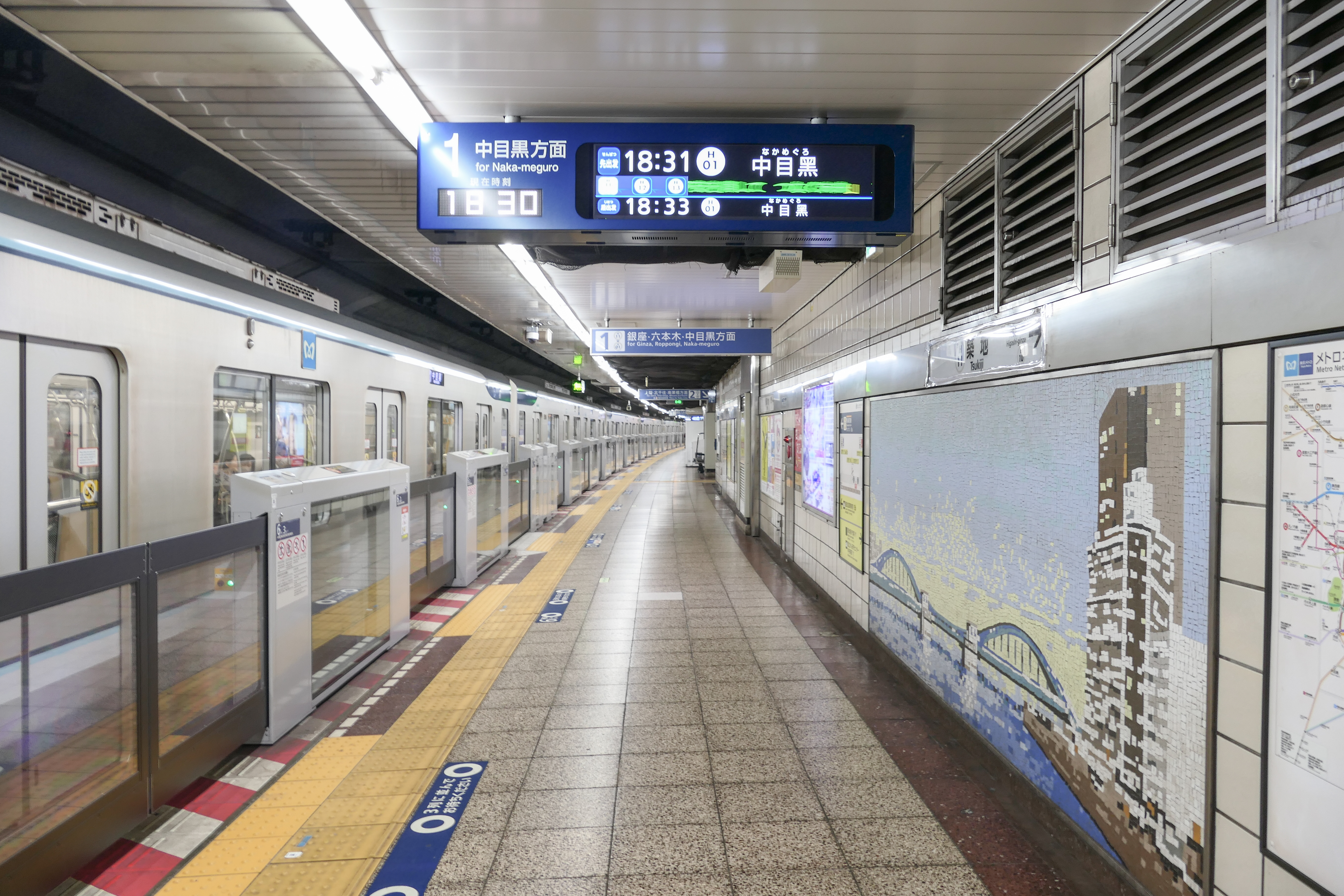
Platform 1

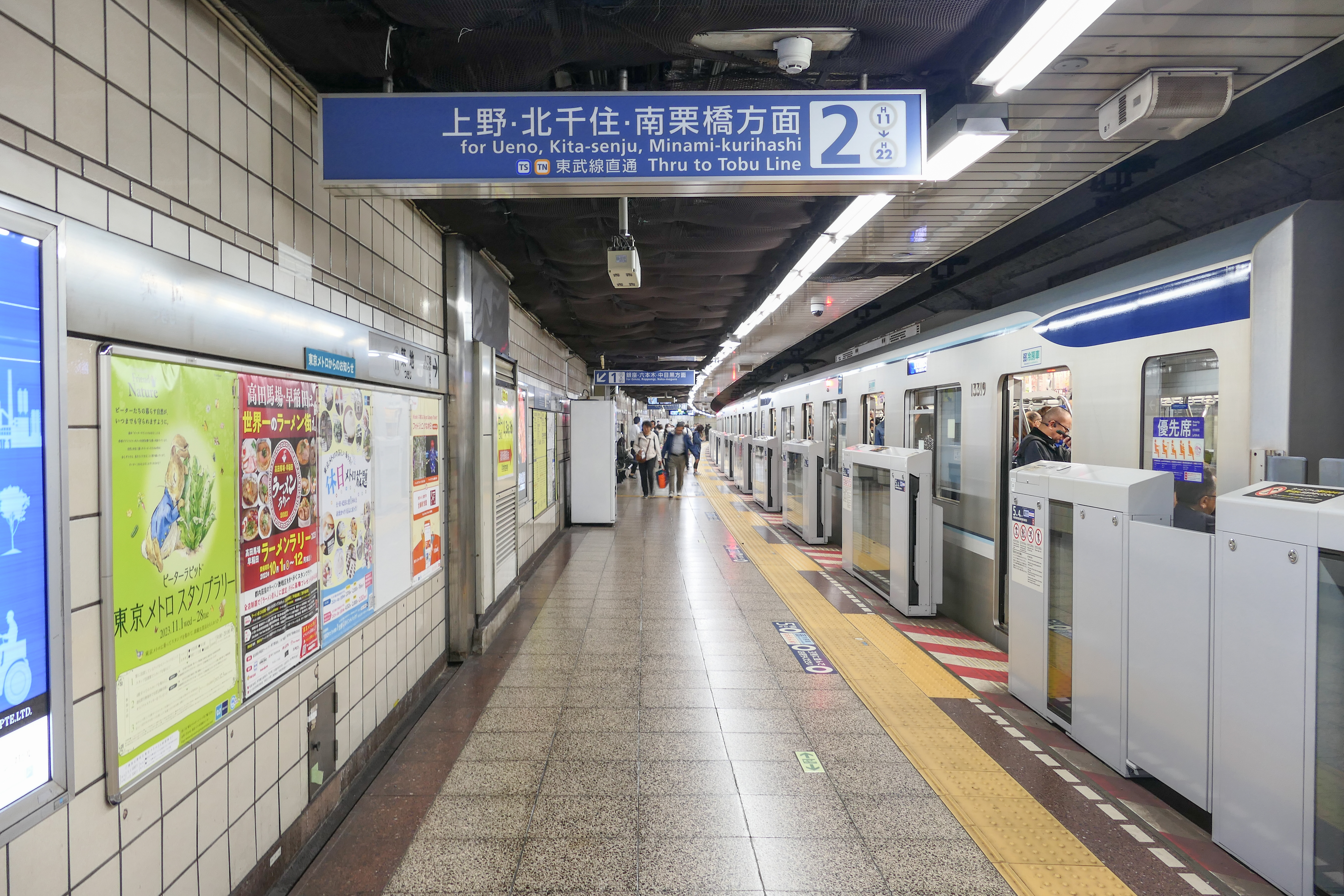
Platform 2

== History ==
Tsukiji Station was opened on 28 February 1963 by the Teito Rapid Transit Authority (TRTA).

The station facilities were inherited by Tokyo Metro after the privatization of the TRTA in 2004.

== Surrounding area ==
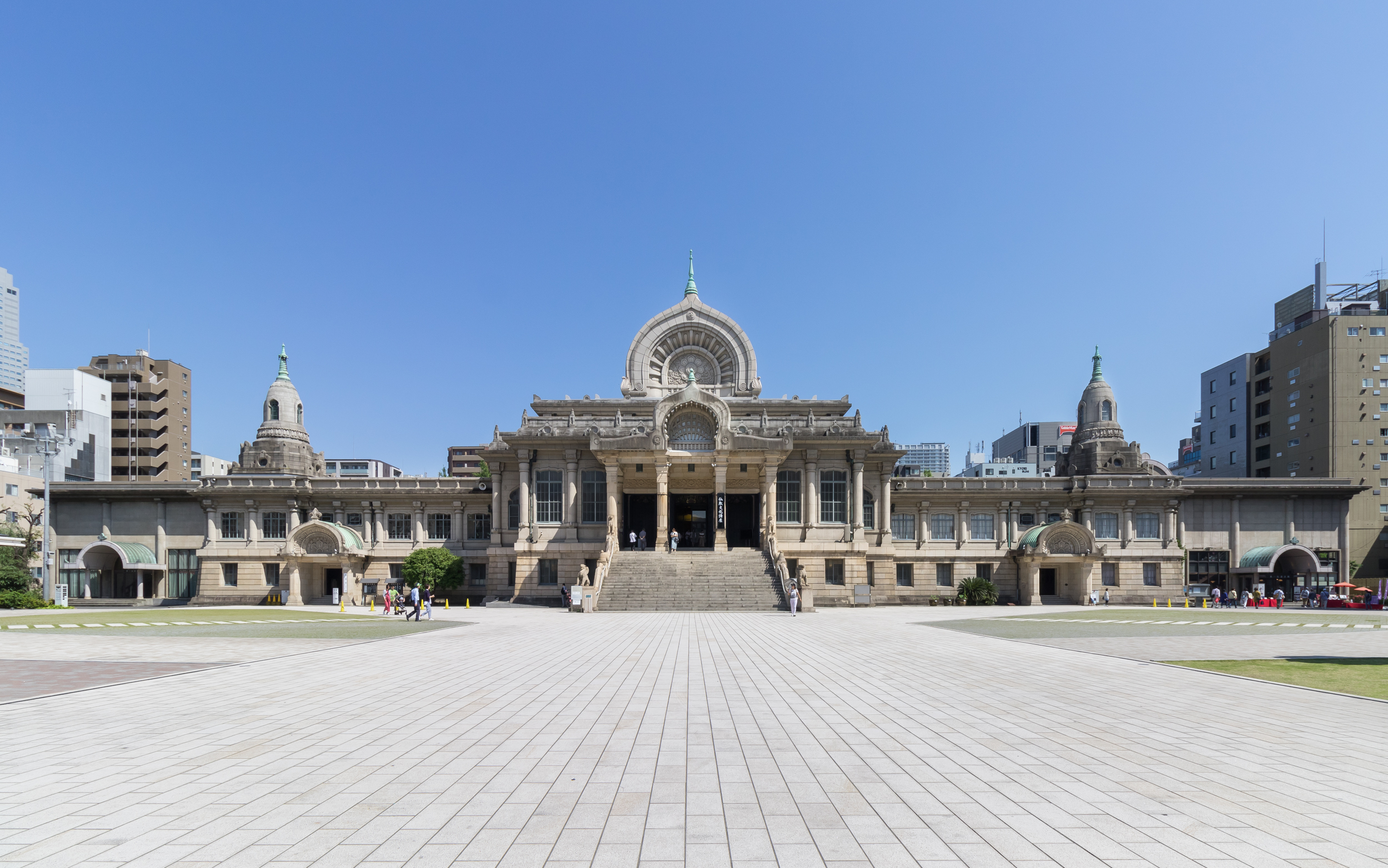
Tsukiji Hongan-ji

- Shintomichō Station ( Tokyo Metro Yurakucho Line) (approximately 2 minutes' walk)

The station is located in the Tsukiji neighbourhood of Chūō, Tokyo. Only a few blocks south of the station (about 150 m) lies Tsukiji fish market, the largest seafood market in the world. On the eastern side of the station is the Tsukiji Hongan-ji, a pilgrimage site for Buddhists worldwide.
