= Hatchōbori Station (Tokyo) =

Railway and metro station in Tokyo, Japan

JE02 Hatchōbori Station 八丁堀駅

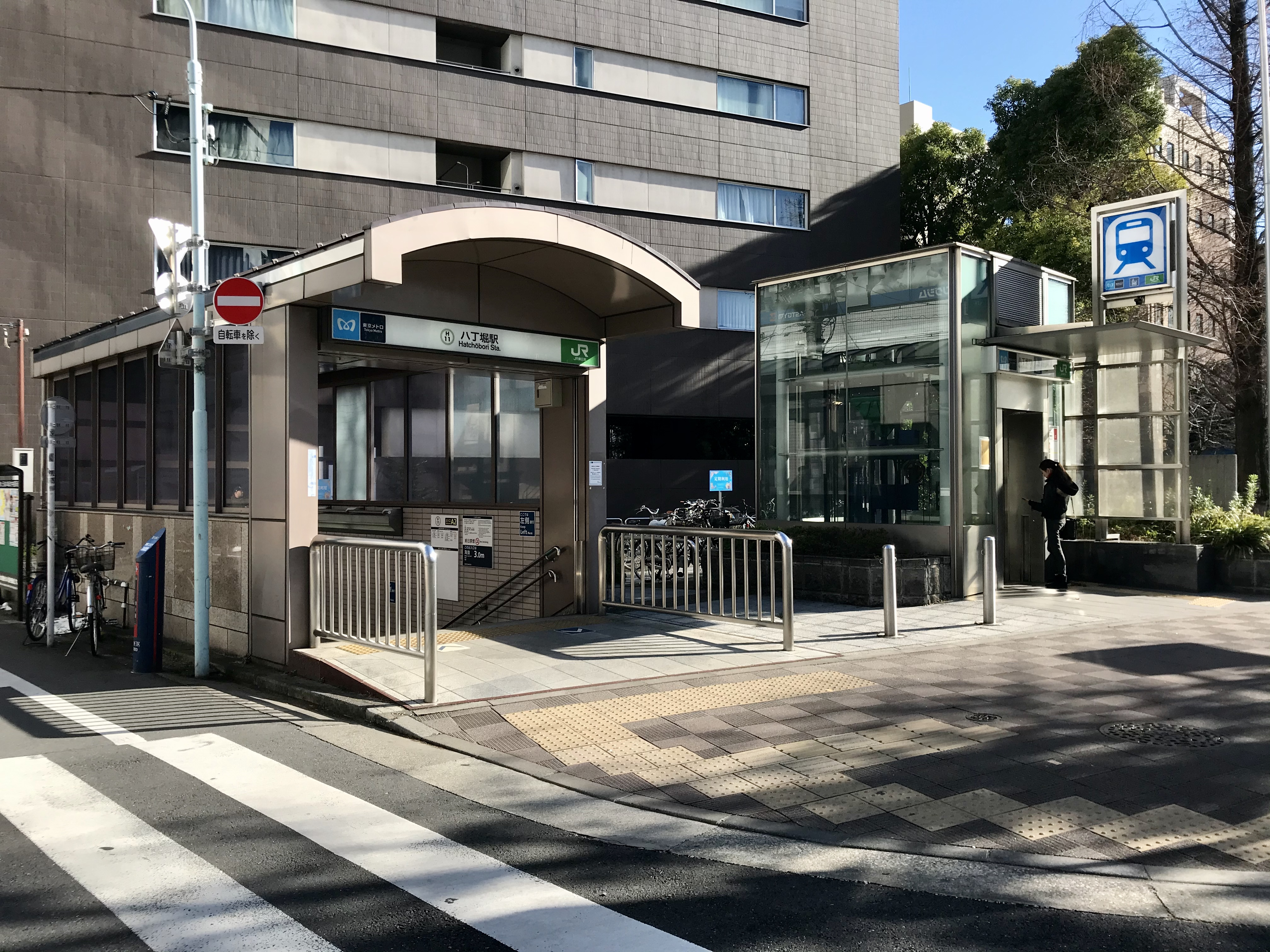
- Entrance to Hatchobori Station

General information
- Location: 3-25-10 Hatchōbori; Chūō, Tokyo; Japan
- Coordinates: 35°40′29″N 139°46′37″E
- Operator: JR East; Tokyo Metro
- Lines: Hibiya Line; Keiyō Line
- Distance: 9.7 km (6.0 mi) from Kita-Senju; 1.2 km (0.75 mi) from Tokyo
- Platforms: 2 island platforms
- Tracks: 4

Construction
- Structure type: Underground
- Accessible: Yes

Other information
- Station code: JE02, H12

History
- Opened: 28 February 1963; 63 years ago

Passengers
- FY2010: 28,969 daily (JR East)

Services
Preceding station	JR East	Following station
Tokyo Terminus	Keiyō Line Rapid	Shin-Kiba JE05 towards Soga
Tokyo Terminus	Keiyō Line Local	Etchūjima JE03 towards Soga
Tokyo Terminus	Musashino Line Keiyō Line through-service	Etchūjima JE03 towards Fuchūhommachi
Preceding station	Tokyo Metro	Following station
Tsukiji towards Naka-meguro	Hibiya Line	Kayabachō towards Kita-Senju
Location
- Location within Tokyo Keiyo area Location within Tokyo wards area Location within Japan

Hatchōbori Station (八丁堀駅, Hatchōbori-eki) is a railway station in Chūō, Tokyo, Japan, operated by both the Tokyo Metro and the East Japan Railway Company (JR East).

== Lines ==
Hatchōbori Station is served by the Hibiya Line subway and the Keiyō Line from Tokyo to Soga. The station is also served by Musashino Line through-running services between Tokyo and Fuchūhommachi. It is located 9.7 km from the starting point of the Hibiya Line at Kita-Senju, and 1.2 km from the western terminus of the Keiyō Line at Tokyo Station.

== Station layout ==
Hatchōbori Station consists of two individual stations run by different rail operators connected by underground passageways.

=== Tokyo Metro platforms ===
The Tokyo Metro station consists of an underground island platform serving two tracks.

1	Hibiya Line	for Ginza, Roppongi, and Naka-Meguro
2	Hibiya Line	for Ueno and Kita-Senju; Tobu Skytree Line for Tōbu-Dōbutsu-Kōen; Tobu Nikko Line for Minami-Kurihashi

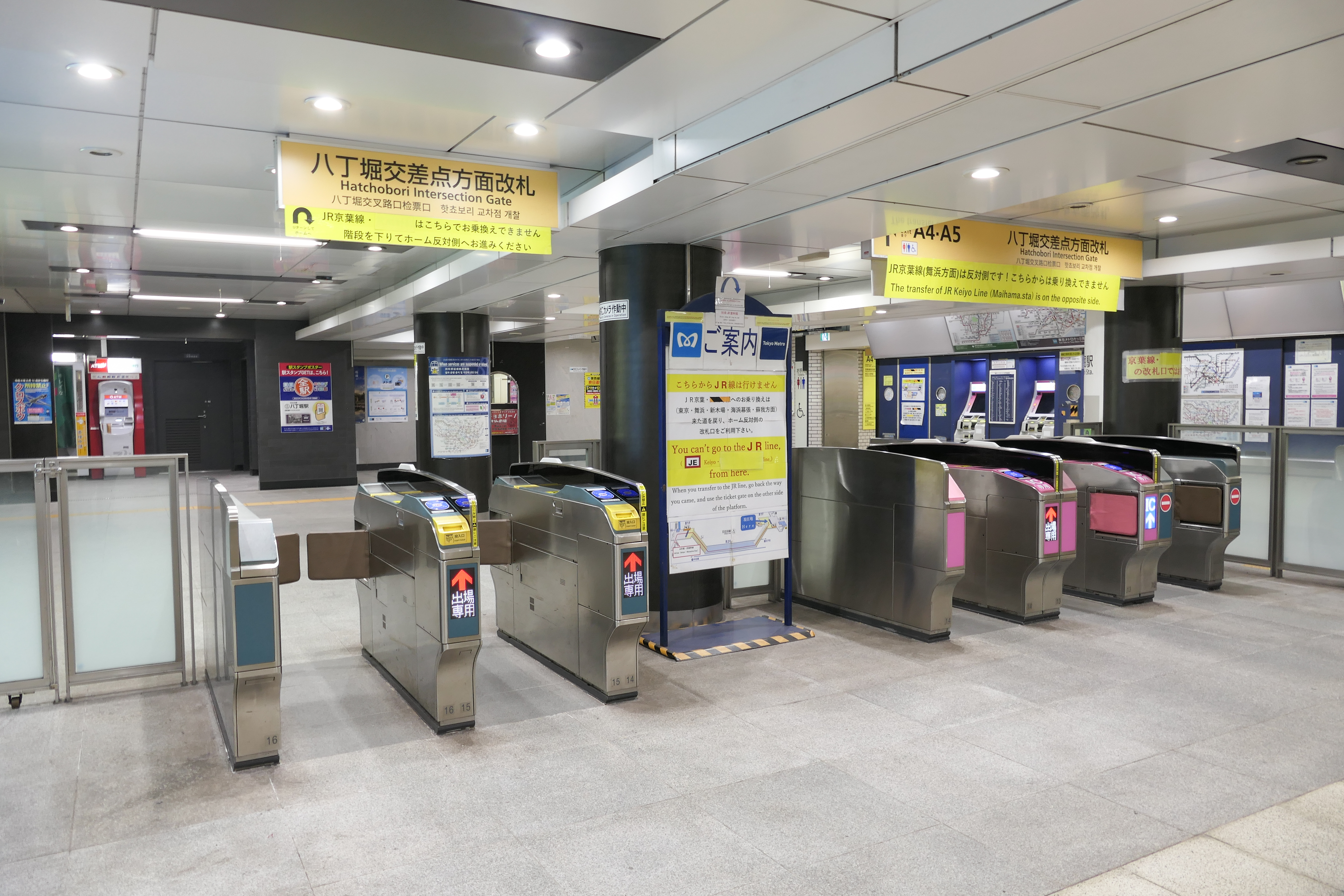
Tokyo Metro ticket gates

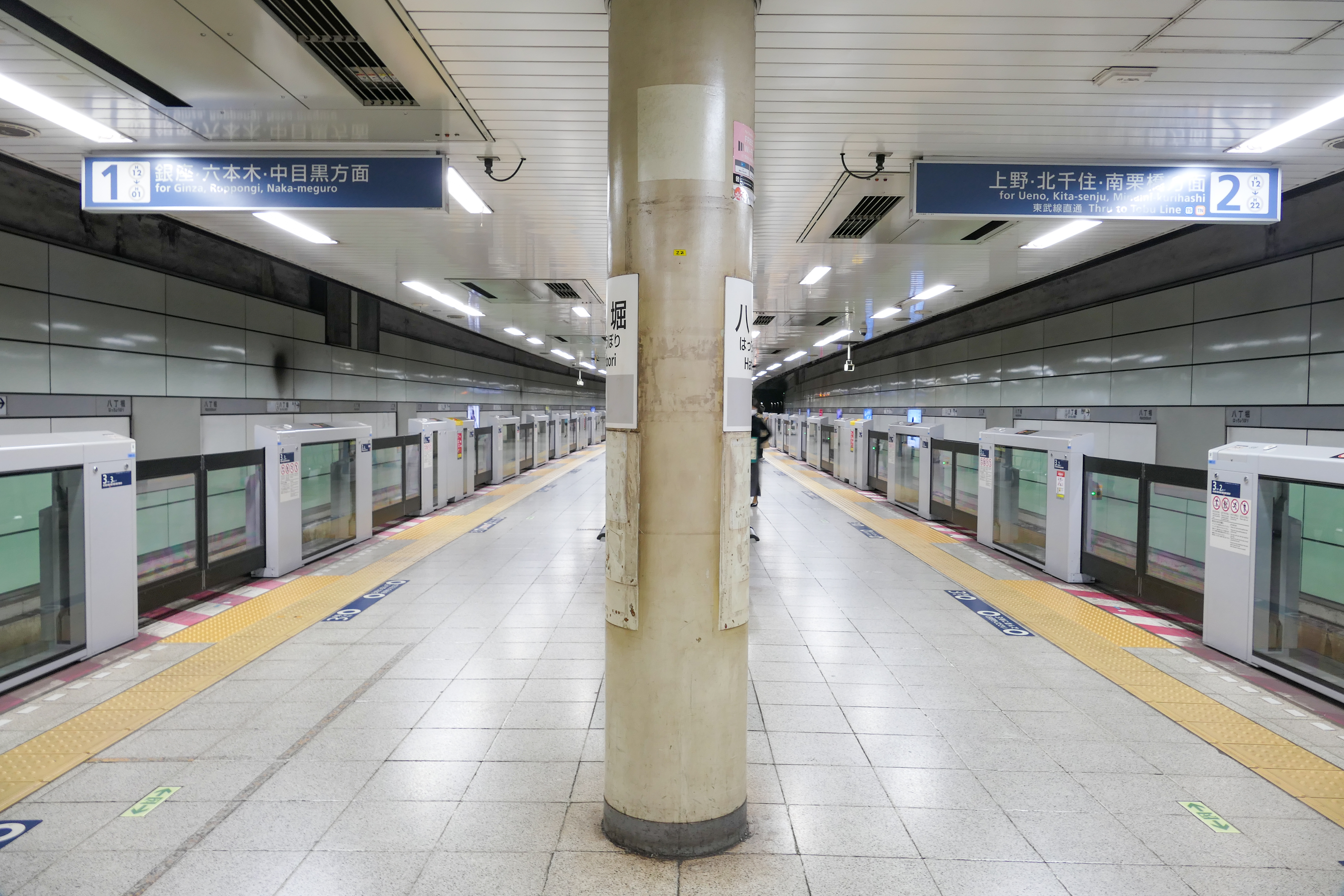
Tokyo Metro platforms

=== JR East platforms ===
The JR East station also consists of an underground island platform serving two tracks. The JR line platform is deeper underground than the Hibiya Line platform.

1	Keiyō Line	for Maihama and Soga
1	Musashino Line through service	for Nishi-Funabashi and Fuchūhommachi
2	Keiyō Line	for Tokyo

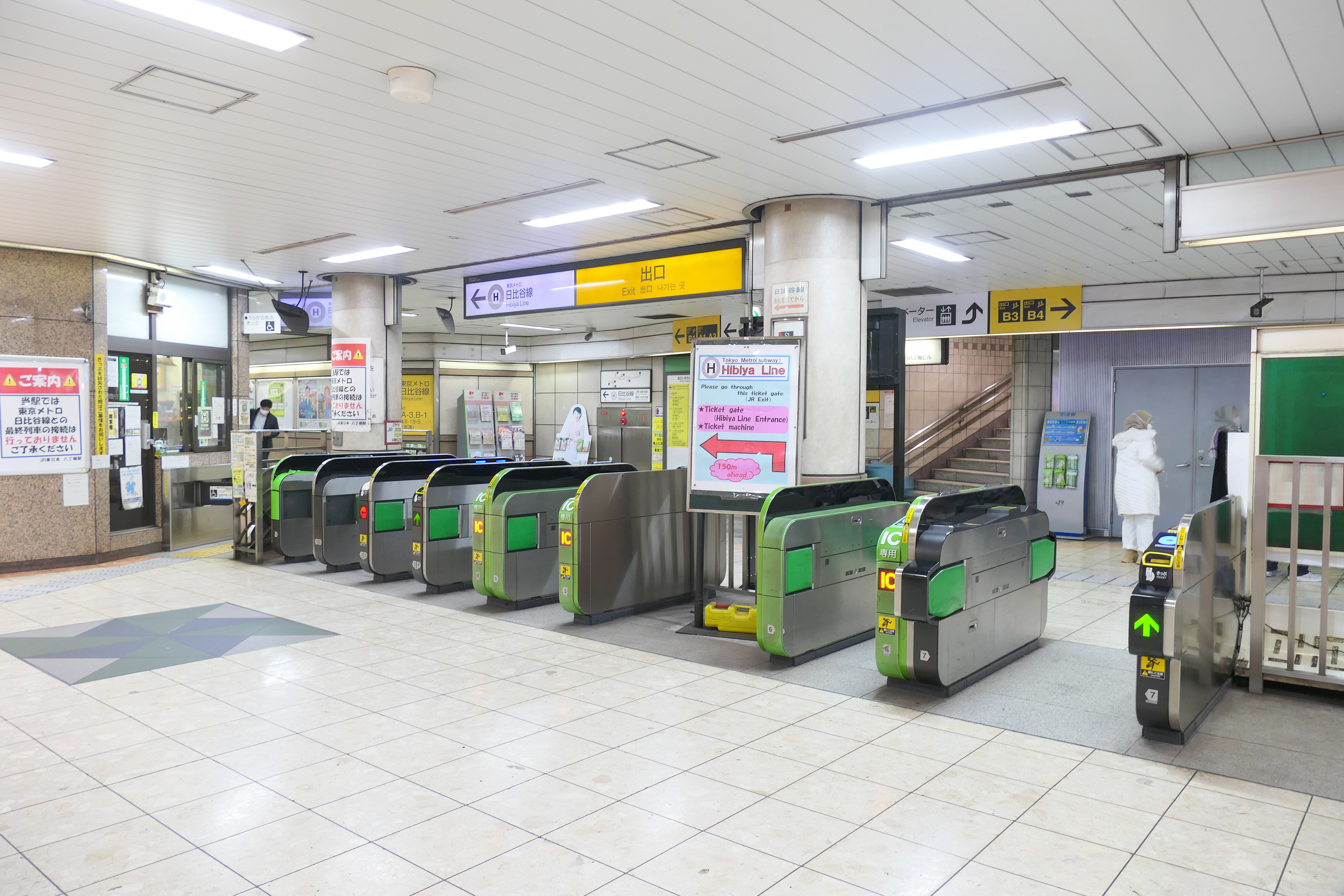
JR East ticket gates

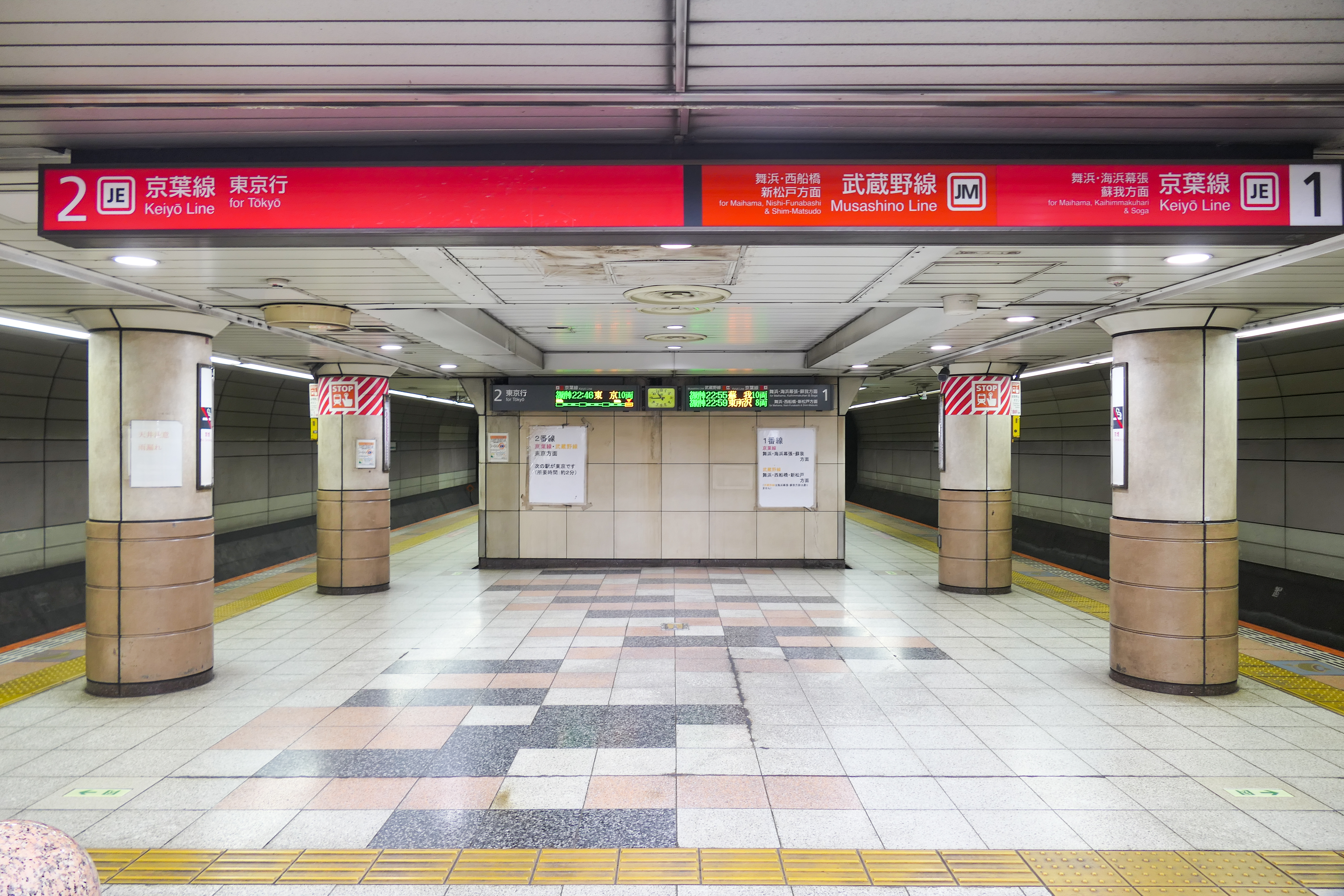
JR East platforms

== History ==
The Tokyo Metro station was opened on 28 February 1963 by the Teito Rapid Transit Authority (TRTA). The JR East station opened on 10 March 1990.

The station facilities of the Hibiya Line were inherited by Tokyo Metro after the privatization of the TRTA in 2004.

Station numbering was introduced to the JR East platforms in 2016 with Hatchobori being assigned station number JE02.

== Passenger statistics ==
In fiscal 2010, the JR East station was used by an average of 28,969 passengers daily (boarding passengers only).

== Surrounding area ==
The station is located in the Hatchōbori neighbourhood of Chūō, Tokyo.

== See also ==
- List of railway stations in Japan
