= Anata to Watashi to Kimi to Boku =

Studio album by Saori Atsumi
- Released: December 25, 2004
- Label: B-Gram

Anata to Watashi to Kimi to Boku (アナタとわたしと君と僕; lit. "You, I, Yourself, and Myself") is an album under an independent label by Saori Atsumi.

== Track listing ==
#	English translation	Japanese title		Time
#	English translation	Kanji	Romaji	Time
1.	"On the Radio in the Middle of the Night"	真夜中のラジオ	Mayonaka no Rajio	4:27
2.	"Love Argument"	恋愛論	"Ren'ai Ron"	3:29
3.	"Please Love Me"	愛をください	Ai wo Kudasai	3:44
4.	"Girlfriend"	彼女	Kanojo	4:00
5.	"My Voice"	僕の声	Boku no Koe	4:19
6.	"Just the First Star of the Evening"	一番星ひとつだけ	Ichiban-boshi Hitotsu Dake	5:01
7.	"Endless Journey"	果てしない旅	Hateshinai Tabi	3:46
8.	"Don't Cry"	泣かないで	Nakanaide	3:29
9.	"Sun Shower"	天気雨	Tenkiame	3:40
10.	"The Place That I See at Sunset"	夕焼けが見える場所	Yūyake ga Mieru Basho	4:47
11.	"Catch Ball"	キャッチボール	Kyacchi Bōru	4:07
