= Shiomi (surname) =

Shiomi (written: 塩見 or 汐見) is a Japanese surname. Notable people with the surname include:

- Etsuko Shiomi (塩見 悦子, born 1955), Japanese actress
- Mieko Shiomi (汐見 美枝子, 1909–1984), Japanese photographer
- Mieko Shiomi (composer) (塩見 允枝子, born 1938), Japanese classical composer
- Rick Shiomi (born 1947), Canadian playwright and theatre director
- Sansei Shiomi (塩見 三省, born 1948), Japanese actor
- Takahiro Shiomi (塩見 貴洋, born 1988), Japanese baseball player
- Gen Shiomi/Shiomi Iwao, the main protagonist of manga series Outrage Girl Shiomi
