= Kachidoki Station =

Metro station in Tokyo, Japan

Coordinates: 35.6587°N 139.7765°E

Kachidoki Station 勝どき駅

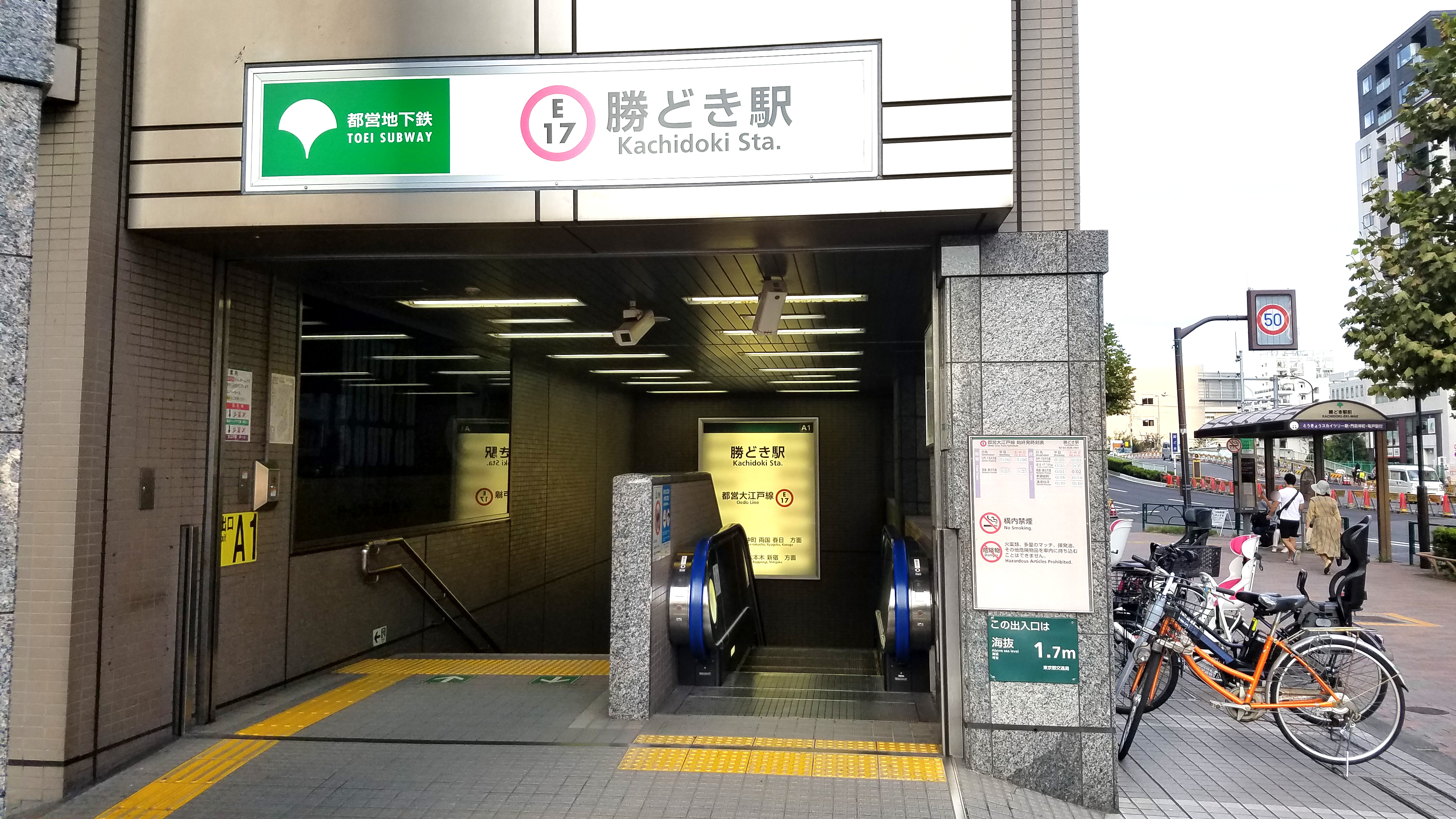
- Entrance A1, 2019

General information
- Location: 2-10-15 Kachidoki, Chūō City, Tokyo （中央区勝どき2-10-15） Japan
- Operator: Toei Subway
- Line: Ōedo Line
- Platforms: 2 side platforms
- Tracks: 2
- Connections: Bus stop

Construction
- Structure type: Underground

Other information
- Station code: E-17

History
- Opened: 12 December 2000; 25 years ago

Passengers
- FY2011: 76,086 daily

Services
Preceding station	Toei Subway	Following station
Tsukijishijō towards Hikarigaoka	Ōedo Line	Tsukishima towards Tochōmae
Location
- Location within Tokyo Yamanote Loop Location within Tokyo wards area Location within Japan

Kachidoki Station (勝どき駅, Kachidoki-eki) is a subway station on the Toei Ōedo Line in Chūō, Tokyo, Japan, operated by the Tokyo subway operator Tokyo Metropolitan Bureau of Transportation (Toei).

== Lines ==
Kachidoki Station is served by the Toei Ōedo Line, and is numbered "E-17".

== Station layout ==
The station has two side platforms on the second basement ("B2F") level, serving two tracks.

=== Platforms ===
1	Ōedo Line	for Ryōgoku and Iidabashi
2	Ōedo Line	for Daimon and Roppongi

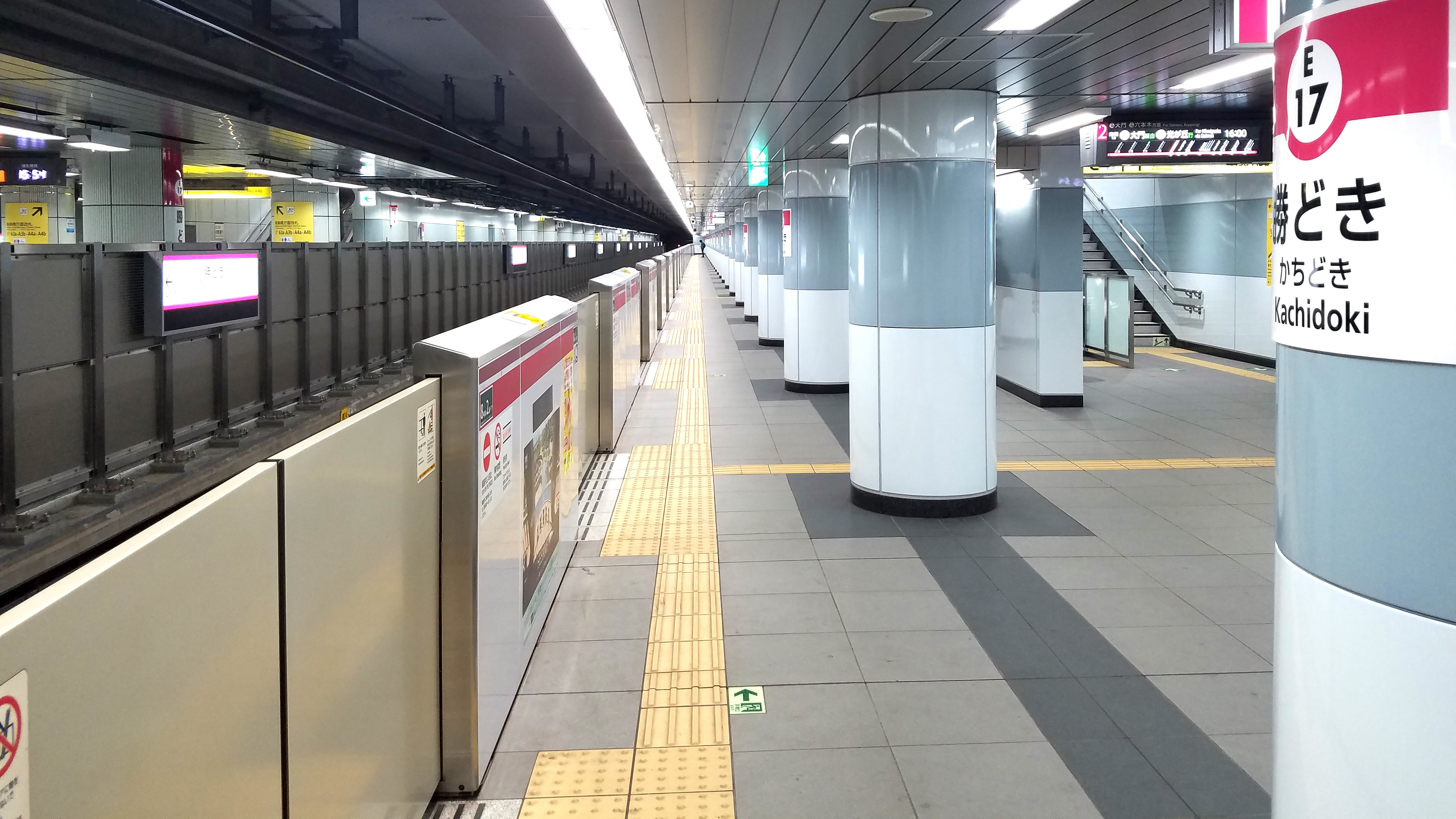
Platform 2, September 2019

== History ==
The station opened on 12 December 2000.

== Passenger statistics ==
In fiscal 2011, the station was used by an average of 76,086 passengers daily.

== Surrounding area ==
- Kachidoki Bridge (with Kachidoki spelled as 勝鬨), which the station takes its name from

== See also ==
- List of railway stations in Japan
