= Shiomi Station (Tokyo) =

Railway station in Tokyo, Japan

Coordinates: 35°39′31.36″N 139°49′2.48″E

JE04 Shiomi Station 潮見駅
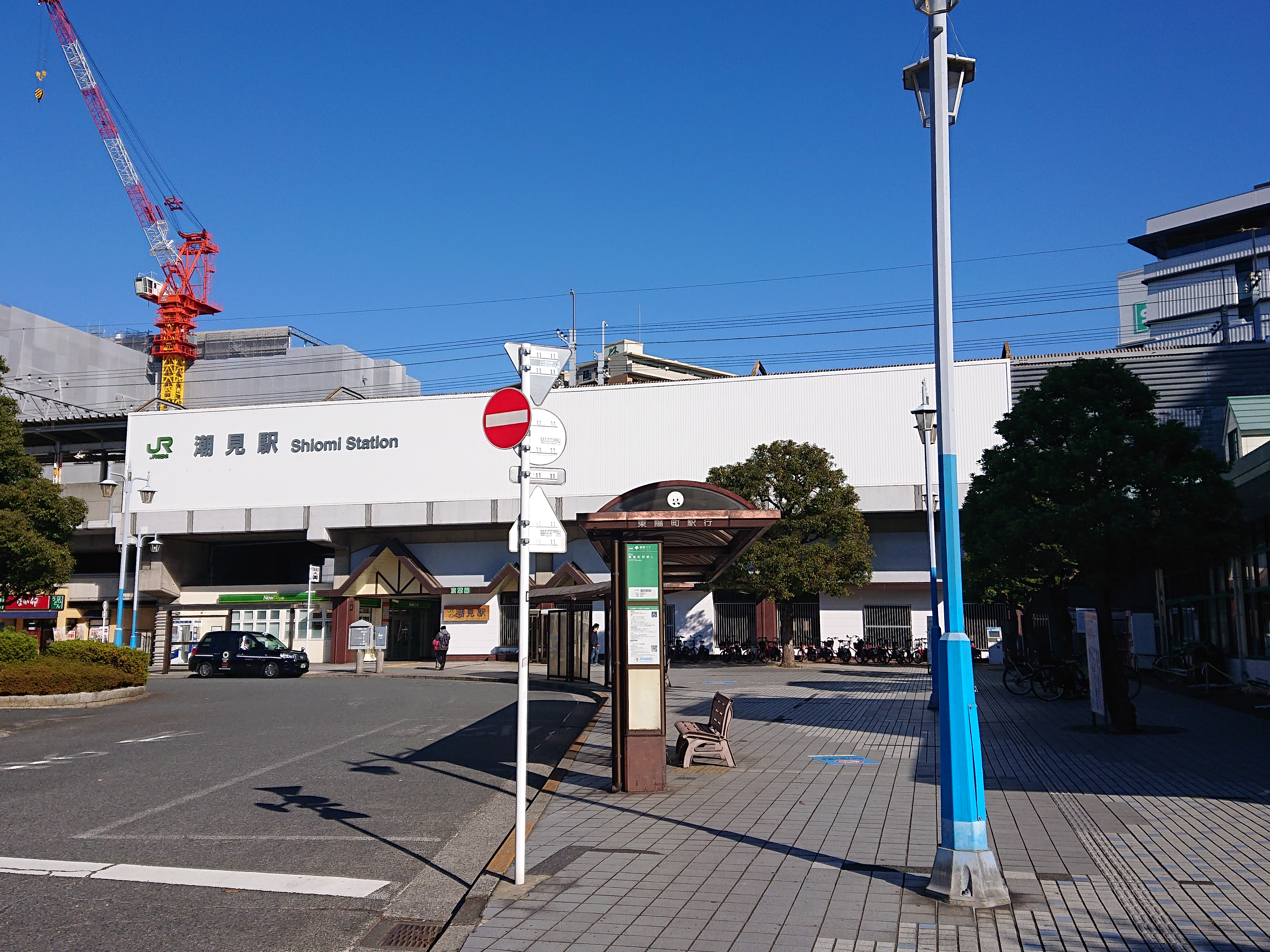
- Shiomi Station (January 2020)

General information
- Location: 2-chōme Shiomi, Kōtō, Tokyo （江東区潮見2丁目） Japan
- Operator: JR East
- Line: Keiyō Line
- Platforms: 1 Island platform
- Tracks: 2
- Connections: Bus stop

Construction
- Structure type: Elevated
- Accessible: Yes

Other information
- Station code: JE04

History
- Opened: 1990

Services
Preceding station	JR East	Following station
Etchūjima JE03 towards Tokyo	Keiyō Line Local	Shin-Kiba JE05 towards Soga
Etchūjima JE03 towards Tokyo	Musashino Line Keiyō Line through-service	Shin-Kiba JE05 towards Fuchūhommachi
Location
- Location within Tokyo Keiyo area Location within Tokyo wards area Location within Japan

Shiomi Station (潮見駅, Shiomi-eki) is a railway station on the Keiyō Line in Kōtō, Tokyo, Japan, operated by East Japan Railway Company (JR East).

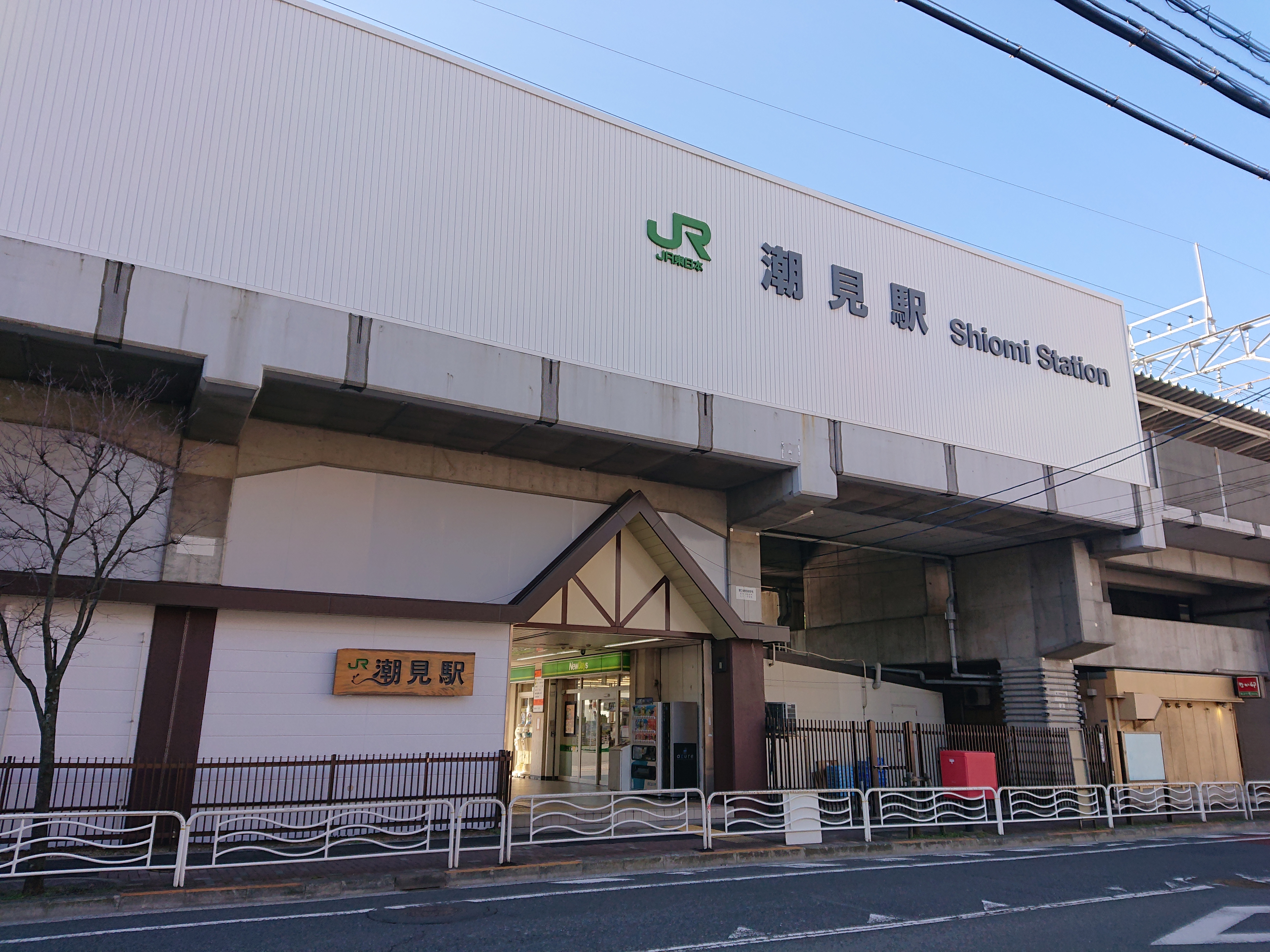
Shiomi Station in January 2020

== Lines ==
Shiomi Station is served by the Keiyō Line. This elevated station consists of a single island platform serving two tracks.

== Platforms ==
1	Keiyō Line	for Maihama, Kaihimmakuhari, and Soga
1	Musashino Line through service	for Nishi-Funabashi and Shim-Matsudo
2	Keiyō Line	for Tokyo

== History ==
The station opened on 10 March 1990.

Station numbering was introduced to the JR East platforms in 2016 with Shiomi being assigned station number JE04.

== See also ==
- List of railway stations in Japan
