= Midori Days =

Japanese manga series and its adaptation(s)

- First tankōbon volume cover, featuring Seiji Sawamura (left) and Midori Kasugano (right)

美鳥の日々 (Midori no Hibi)
- Genre: Romantic comedy
- Manga
- Written by: Kazurou Inoue
- Published by: Shogakukan
- English publisher: AUS: Madman Entertainment; NA: Viz Media; SG: Chuang Yi
- Imprint: Shōnen Sunday Comics
- Magazine: Weekly Shōnen Sunday
- Original run: September 18, 2002 – July 21, 2004
- Volumes: 8
- Anime television series
- Directed by: Tsuneo Kobayashi
- Music by: Yoshihisa Hirano
- Studio: Studio Pierrot
- Licensed by: AUS: Madman Entertainment; NA: Media Blasters
- Original network: TVK, CTC, Teletama, KBS Kyoto, SUN, TVA, Animax
- Original run: April 4, 2004 – June 27, 2004
- Episodes: 13
- icon

Midori Days (Japanese: 美鳥の日々, Hepburn: Midori no Hibi) is a Japanese manga series by Kazurou Inoue. It was serialized in Shogakukan's shōnen manga magazine Weekly Shōnen Sunday from September 2002 to July 2004, with its chapters collected in eight tankōbon volumes. The manga was licensed in North America by Viz Media. The series follows Seiji Sawamura, who one day finds his right hand replaced with a girl named Midori Kasugano and his attempts to return her to her real body.

The series was adapted as a 13-episode anime television series produced by Studio Pierrot, broadcast from April to June 2004. The anime series was licensed in North America by Media Blasters.

== Plot ==
Seiji "Mad Dog" Sawamura is the toughest student in his high school. His grades are not very good because he fights more than he studies, but he tends to protect the weaker students from bullies. A few classmates idolize him; one (Midori Kasugano from a different school) shyly loves him from afar; but everybody else is just afraid of him, which has made it impossible for him to find a girlfriend. In desperation, he says to himself that he wants a girlfriend no matter who it is. He then notices a miniature Midori attached to where his right hand used to be. Because of this, the pair must learn how to adapt to this sudden and forced closeness.

== Characters ==
=== Main characters ===
Midori Kasugano (春日野 美鳥, Kasugano Midori)
Voiced by: Mai Nakahara (Japanese); Kether Donohue (Media Blasters dub), Claudia Thomas (Animax dub) (English)
A 16-year-old girl who ends up as Seiji's right hand. She has had a crush on him for three years. One day, she wishes to be with him, so much so that she finds herself in the place of his right hand. This causes problems for him, since it is his "Devil's Right Hand" that he punches with. Midori's real body is in a coma, and her mother tries everything to bring her back.
Seiji Sawamura (沢村 正治, Sawamura Seiji)
Voiced by: Kishō Taniyama, Chiwa Saitō (young)^{Ep. 3 credits} (Japanese); Drew Aaron (Media Blasters dub), Darren Pleavin (Animax dub) (English)
A 17-year-old delinquent student who is feared for his fighting skills. Seiji fights to protect the weak using his powerful "Devil's Right Hand", and is nicknamed "Mad Dog" Sawamura. Fighting people has a price, however: everyone, including girls, fear him. He has gone seventeen years without a girlfriend and wants one badly.

=== Secondary characters ===
Takako Ayase (綾瀬 貴子, Ayase Takako)
Voiced by: Reiko Takagi (Japanese); Mollie Weaver (Media Blasters dub) (English)
The class representative for Seiji's class. She originally detested him, but after Seiji saves her from a gang, she begins to harbor a secret attraction to him. Unfortunately for her, all of her plans to confess her feelings to him fail, either through Seiji's obliviousness or outside circumstances.
Rin Sawamura (沢村 凛, Sawamura Rin)
Voiced by: Atsuko Yuya, Mikako Takahashi (child)^{Ep. 3 credits} (Japanese); Meredith Zeitlin (Media Blasters dub) (English)
Seiji's violent older sister. She is the former leader of a powerful street gang, and her favorite hobbies are drinking, beating up Seiji, and taking his allowance. She was the one who taught him how to fight when they were young.
Kouta Shingyoji (真行寺 耕太, Shingyōji Kōta)
Voiced by: Rie Kugimiya (Japanese); Sebastian Arcelus (Media Blasters dub) (English)
A childhood friend of Midori's who is also a fellow first year at Ogurabashi High School. He was always in love with Midori, but over the course of the series, he manages to develop feelings for Seiji that make the miniature Midori extremely nervous.
Osamu Miyahara (宮原 オサム, Miyahara Osamu)
Voiced by: Hirofumi Nojima (Japanese); Sean Elias-Reyes (Media Blasters dub) (English)
A year-younger student at Seiji's school and kōhai or underclassman of Seiji. He idolizes Seiji for his fighting skills and is arguably the closest thing to a friend Seiji had before Midori. However, he seemingly can not keep himself out of trouble as he constantly gets caught by rival gangs.
Shuichi Takamizawa (高見沢 修一, Takamizawa Shūichi)
Voiced by: Yūji Ueda (Japanese); Joshua Popenoe (Media Blasters dub) (English)
A classmate of Seiji's who is a doll otaku. He always carries around a doll of a fictional anime character named Ultra-Marin, and seems to have a creepy obsession with the character. He is also good at making clothes for dolls, a talent which means an expanded wardrobe for the miniature Midori when he finds out Seiji's secret.
Shiori Tsukishima (月島 栞, Tsukishima Shiori)
Voiced by: Yukari Tamura (Japanese); Michelle O'Medlin (Media Blasters dub) (English)
A 10-year-old neighbor of Seiji's who has a crush on him. She tries a variety of ways to gain his attention, even going as far as asking Rin what kind of woman Seiji likes. However, he never takes her advances seriously as he still treats her like a child.
Haruka Kasugano (春日野 遥, Kasugano Haruka)
Voiced by: Sayaka Ohara (Japanese); Rachael Lillis (Media Blasters dub) (English)
Midori's mother who is worried about her. Haruka is willing to do anything to cure Midori of her illness. She is very sad about Midori's coma and tries several times to bring her back.

=== Other characters ===
Lucy Winladd (ルーシィ·ウィンラッド, Rūshii Winraddo)
She is an American exchange student who transferred into Seiji's high school (more precisely, into Miyahara's class). She loves Japanese pop culture, especially samurai movies, and admires Seiji because she sees him as an ideal Japanese man.
Nao Makinoha (槙葉 奈緒, Makinoha Nao)
A silent, mysterious girl in Seiji's class. She loves strange phenomena, and thus takes an interest in Seiji's transformed right hand. She seemingly appears at the strangest times, which gives Seiji quite a scare.
Shiro Makinoha (槙葉 史郎, Makinoha Shirō)
Nao's father who is a doctor. He always attempts to capture Seiji so he can dissect him to show Midori to the medical community and gain fame from his findings. While his attempts are usually foiled by Nao, Seiji and Midori occasionally do this as well.
Hisashi Sakisaka (向坂久, Sakisaka Hisashi)
Rin's boyfriend, Sakisaka is a treasure hunter and loves to travel the world. However, his constant disappearances annoy Rin to no end.
Miku Nekobe (猫部 美紅, Nekobe Miku)
She is the leader of the Crimson Angels (Kurenai Benten), an all-female gang who constantly harasses and embarrasses Kouta (most notably by dressing him up in girl's clothing). Despite this, she has a soft spot for the boy and later helps him out when he tries to separate Seiji and Midori.
Yukina Asano (浅野 ゆきな, Asano Yukina)
Yukina Asano is Seiji's first (sort of) girlfriend and childhood sweetheart. She had become friends with him when they were both 10 years old, but since she had to move away, they did not see each other for seven years until a chance meeting at a place of mutual memory.
Rina Kamaki (鎌木 梨奈, Kamaki Rina)
An 11th-grader who is one of the popular and best students at Seiji's school, and the daughter of a trading company's chairman. For her popularity, she has earned the unofficial nickname kamakiri fujin ("praying mantis").

== Media ==
=== Manga ===
Written and illustrated by Kazurou Inoue, Midori Days was serialized in Shogakukan's shōnen manga magazine Weekly Shōnen Sunday from September 18, 2002, to July 21, 2004. The 85 individual chapters were collected into eight tankōbon volumes, published from January 18, 2003, to October 18, 2004.

The series was licensed in North America by Viz Media, in Singapore by Chuang Yi, and in Australia by Madman Entertainment.

==== Volumes ====
| No. | Original release date | Original ISBN | English release date | English ISBN |
|---|---|---|---|---|
| 1 | January 18, 2003 | 978-4-09-126651-4 | August 23, 2005 (Viz Media); June 21, 2006 (Madman Entertainment) | 978-1-59-116905-5; ISBN 978-9-81-420469-9 |
Days 01. "Right-Hand Sweetheart" (右手のコイビト, Migite no Koibito); Days 02. "The One Longed After" (憧れの人, Akogare no Hito); Days 03. "The Lovely 'Mad Dog'" (孤独な狂犬, Kodoku na Kyouken); Days 04. "The Desk's Distance" (机のキョリ, Tsukue no Kyori); Days 05. "The Secret Companion" (秘密の仲間, Himitsu no Chuugen); Days 06. "Something Important" (大切なもの, Taisetsu na Mono); Days 07. "Chin-ups" (２人の懸垂, Futari no Kensui); Days 08. "A Pitiful Man" (哀しい男, Kanashii Otoko); Days 09. "One Quiet Day" (静かな１日, Shizuka na Ichinichi); Days 10. "The Kiss of a Prince" (王子の口づけ, Ouji no Kuchitsuke)
| 2 | April 18, 2003 | 978-4-09-126652-1 | October 11, 2005 (Viz Media); July 26, 2006 (Madman Entertainment) | 978-1-59-116906-2; ISBN 97-8-98-1269055-5 |
Days 11. "Farewell, Midori (Part 1)" (さよなら美鳥（前編）, Sayonara Midori (Zenpen)); Days 12. "Farewell, Midori (Part 2)" (さよなら美鳥（後編）, Sayonara Midori (Kōhen)); Days 13. "Operation: Decoy" (オトリ作戦, Otori Sakusen); Days 14. "An Unknown Side" (知らない一面, Shiranai Ichimen); Days 15. "The 'Pomade' Kid" (ポマード小僧, Pomādo Kozō); Days 16. "A Wife's Duty" (妻の役目, Tsuma no Yakume); Days 17. "The Look of Passion" (情熱の視線, Jōnetsu no Shisen); Days 18. "The Return of the Nightmare" (悪夢ふたたび, Akumu Futatabi); Days 19. "Real Mother" (本当の母親, Hontō no Hahaoya); Days 20. "The Kiss of the King" (王様のキス, Ōsama no Kisu); Days 21. "Unexpected Feelings" (伝わらぬ想い, Tsutawaranu Omoi)
| 3 | July 18, 2003 | 978-4-09-126653-8 | December 13, 2005 (Viz Media); August 16, 2006 (Madman Entertainment) | 978-1-59-116907-9; ISBN 978-9-81-269057-9 |
Days 22. "Seduction Attack" (悩殺のアタック, Nōsatsu no Atakku); Days 23. "The Path of a Man" (男の道, Otoko no Michi); Days 24. "Secrets of the Flesh" (肉体の神秘, Nikutai no Shinpi); Days 25. "The Pursuer" (追う女, Ou on'na); Days 26. "Make me a Man!" (僕を男に！, Boku o Otoko Ni!); Days 27. "Sawamura's Type" (沢村の好み, Sawamura no Konomi); Days 28. "Tonight we 'Take-it-off'" (今夜はボンバイエ, Kon'ya wa Bonbaie); Days 29. "Love Training" (愛の教育実習, Ai no Kyōiku Jisshū); Days 30. "Exam Time" (2人の追試, 2-Ri no Tsuishi); Days 31. "The Will of the Soul" (魂の意志, Tamashī no Ishi); Days 32. "True Happiness" (本当の幸せ, Hontō no Shiawase)
| 4 | October 18, 2003 | 978-4-09-126654-5 | February 14, 2006 (Viz Media); September 6, 2006 (Madman Entertainment) | 978-1-42-150254-0; ISBN 978-9-81-269176-7 |
Days 33. "Go for it, Ayase!" (綾瀬やります！, Ayase Yarimasu!); Days 34. "The Mad Doctor's Counterattack" (変態博士の逆襲, Hentai Hakase no Gyakushū); Days 35. "My Girlfriend" (僕の彼女, Boku no Kanojo); Days 36. "The Mysterious Girl" (幻の美少女, Maboroshi no Bishōjo); Days 37. "The Hopeless Romantic" (ロマンの男, Roman no Otoko); Days 38. "The Well Known Secret" (公然の秘密, Kōzen no Himitsu); Days 39. "The Elegy of Man" (男達の挽歌, Otokotachi no Banka); Days 40. "The Group Work of Love" (愛の共同作業, Ai no Kyōdō Sagyō); Days 41. "The Mark of the Samurai" (サムライの証, Samurai no Akashi); Days 42. "Their World" (2人の世界, 2-Ri no Sekai); Days 43. "Indomitable Courage" (負けない勇気, Makenai Yūki)
| 5 | March 18, 2004 | 978-4-09-126655-2 | April 11, 2006 (Viz Media); October 11, 2006 (Madman Entertainment) | 978-1-42-150287-8; ISBN 978-9-81-269210-8 |
Days 44. "Power's Limits" (力の限り, Chikara no Kagiri); Days 45. "I Hate Dogs" (犬は大嫌い, Inu wa Daikirai); Days 46. "Real Woman" (生身の女, Namami no On'na); Days 47. "Reliable Man" (頼れる人, Tayoreru Hito); Days 48. "Final Request" (最後の願い, Saigo no Negai); Days 49. "The Links of Fate" (結ばれる運命, Musuba Reru Unmei); Days 50. "Reason for Living" (存在理由, Sonzai Riyū); Days 51. "Propose" (プロポーズ, Puropōzu); Days 52. "American Deception" (アメリカ魂, Amerika Tamashī); Days 53. "Fateful Reunion" (運命の再会, Unmei no Saikai); Days 54. "Kouta's Choice" (耕太の選択, Kōta no Sentaku)
| 6 | April 17, 2004 | 978-4-09-126656-9 | June 13, 2006 (Viz Media); November 10, 2006 (Madman Entertainment) | 978-1-42-150495-7; ISBN 978-9-81-269252-8 |
Days 55. "Mud-Caked Glory" (泥まみれの栄光, Doromamire no Eikō); Days 56. "Victory Ceremony" (勝利の儀式, Shōri no Gishiki); Days 57. "Ultimate Otaku" (マニアの鑑, Mania no Kan); Days 58. "Seiji's First Love" (正治の初恋, Masaharu no Hatsukoi); Days 59. "Desired Woman" (想われる女, Omowa Reru On'na); Days 60. "Cupio of Love" (愛のキューピッド, Ai no Kyūpiddo); Days 61. "Proof of Wildness" (野生の証, Yasei no Shōmei); Days 62. "State of Emergency" (緊急事態, Jǐnjí Shìtài); Days 63. "The Newtype's Power" (新型の力, Shingata no Chikara); Days 64. "Expression of Love" (愛情表現, Aijō Hyōgen); Days 65. "Sawamura's Decision" (沢村の選択, Sawamura no Sentaku)
| 7 | June 18, 2004 | 978-4-09-126657-6 | August 8, 2006 (Viz Media); November 10, 2006 (Madman Entertainment) | 978-1-42-150496-4; ISBN 978-9-81-269407-2 |
Days 66. "Shameful Woman" (恥辱の女, Chijoku no On'na); Days 67. "Telepathy" (以心伝心, I Shin Den Shin); Days 68. "Hidden Feelings" (秘めた思い, Himeta Omoi); Days 69. "Street Fight Baseball" (ケンカ野球, Kenka Yakyū); Days 70. "Father and Son" (父と息子, Chichi to Musuko); Days 71. "Existence of Friends" (友の存在, Tomo no Sonzai); Days 72. "Farewell Party" (送別会, Sōbetsu-kai); Days 73. "Farewell, Lucy" (さよならルーシィ, Sayonara Rūshi); Days 74. "The Limits of Patience" (ガマンの限界, Gaman no Genkai); Days Special. "Midori's Days in the Glorius Edo" (花のお江戸の美鳥の日々, Hana no Oedo no Midori no Hibi)
| 8 | October 18, 2004 | 978-4-09-126658-3 | October 10, 2006 (Viz Media); February 10, 2007 (Madman Entertainment) | 978-1-42-150497-1; ISBN 978-9-81-269408-9 |
Days 75. "Fair and Square" (正正堂堂, Seiseidōdō); Days 76. "Step Towards a Dream" (夢の第一歩, Yume no Daiippo); Days 77. "Girl Genius" (天才少女, Tensai Shōjo); Days 78. "Final Option" (最後の手段, Saigo no Shudan); Days 79. "The Greatest Girl" (最高の女の子, Saikō no On'nanoko); Days 80. "Vague Attitude" (あいまいな態度, Aimaina Taido); Days 81. "Confession" (告白, Kokuhaku); Days 82. "True Feelings" (本心, Honshin); Days 83. "Once More" (もう一度, Mōichido); Days 84. "Diary" (日記, Nikki); Days Final. "New Days" (新しい日々, Atarashī Hibi)

=== Anime ===
An anime television series adaptation by Studio Pierrot aired on tvk and other UHF stations from April 4 to June 27, 2004. The series was directed by Tsuneo Kobayashi, with Yuko Kusumoto providing the character designs and Yoshihisa Hirano composing the music. CooRie performed the opening theme "Sentimental" (センチメンタル, Senchimentaru), while Saori Atsumi performed the ending theme "Mōsukoshi... Mōsukoshi..." (もう少し...もう少し...; lit. 'A Little More... A Little More...'). The series was licensed in North America by Media Blasters.

==== Episodes ====
| No. | Title (Note: All English titles are taken from Media Blasters.) | Original release date |
|---|---|---|
| 1 | "The Right-Hand Girlfriend" "Migite no Koibito" (右手no恋人) | April 4, 2004 |
| 2 | "The Love Between Us" "Futari no Omoi" (二人no思い) | April 11, 2004 |
| 3 | "The Day of Discoveries" "Hakken no Hibi" (発見no日々) | April 18, 2004 |
| 4 | "Discovery of the Secret!?" "Himitsu no Hakkaku!?" (秘密no発覚!?) | April 25, 2004 |
| 5 | "The Power of Love" "Ai no Chikara" (アイnoチカラ) | May 2, 2004 |
| 6 | "Shiori's Love-Love Battle!" "Shiori no Raburabu Sakusen!" (栞noラブラブ大作戦!) | May 9, 2004 |
| 7 | "First Date" "Hajimete no Deito" (はじめてnoデート) | May 16, 2004 |
| 8 | "Right-hand Seiji" "Migite no Seiji" (右手noセイジ) | May 23, 2004 |
| 9 | "Takky Days" "Takky no Hibi" (タッキーno日々) | May 30, 2004 |
| 10 | "Distance of the Hearts" "Kokoro no Kyori" (ココロno距離) | June 6, 2004 |
| 11 | "Fated Reunion" "Unmei no Saikai" (運命no再会) | June 13, 2004 |
| 12 | "Sudden Parting" "Totsuzen no Wakare" (突然no別れ) | June 20, 2004 |
| 13 | "Our Days" "Futari no Hibi" (二人no日々) | June 27, 2004 |
