= Tsukishima Station =

Metro station in Tokyo, Japan

Coordinates: 35°39′51.6708″N 139°47′5.5032″E

Tsukishima Station 月島駅

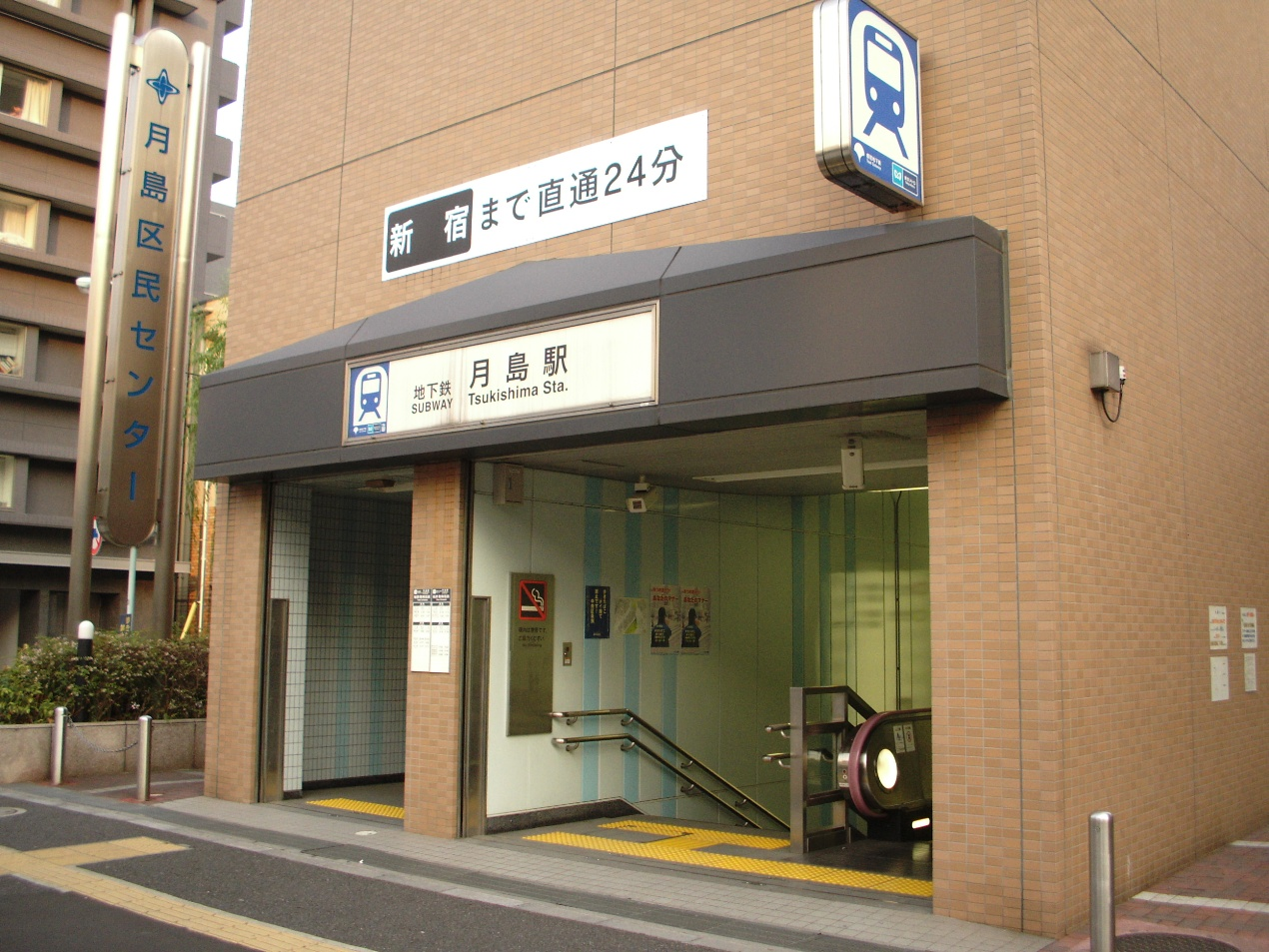

General information
- Location: 1 Tsukishima, Chūō City, Tokyo （中央区月島一丁目） Japan
- Operator: Tokyo Metro; Toei Subway
- Lines: Yūrakuchō Line; Ōedo Line
- Platforms: 2 island platforms (1 for each line)
- Tracks: 4

Construction
- Structure type: Underground

Other information
- Station code: E-16, Y-21

History
- Opened: 8 June 1988; 38 years ago

Services
Preceding station	Tokyo Metro	Following station
Shintomichō towards Wakoshi	Yūrakuchō Line	Toyosu towards Shin-kiba
Preceding station	Toei Subway	Following station
Kachidoki towards Hikarigaoka	Ōedo Line	Monzen-nakachō towards Tochōmae
Location
- Location within Tokyo Yamanote Loop Location within Tokyo wards area Location within Japan

Tsukishima Station (月島駅, Tsukishima-eki) is a subway station in Chūō, Tokyo, Japan, jointly operated by Tokyo Metro and Toei Subway. The station opened on June 8, 1988.

== Lines ==
Tsukishima Station is served by the following two lines.

- Tokyo Metro Yūrakuchō Line
- Toei Ōedo Line

== Platforms ==
The station is constructed in a T-shape. The two platforms are connected via a hallway on the 1st basement floor, but passengers wishing to transfer must pass through the ticket gates of each company to transfer.

=== Tokyo Metro ===
The Tokyo Metro portion of the station is composed of a single island platform serving two tracks.

1	Yūrakuchō Line	for Toyosu, Tatsumi, and Shin-kiba
2	Yūrakuchō Line	for Nagatachō, Ikebukuro and Wakōshi; Tobu Tojo Line for Shinrinkōen; Seibu Ikebukuro Line for Hannō

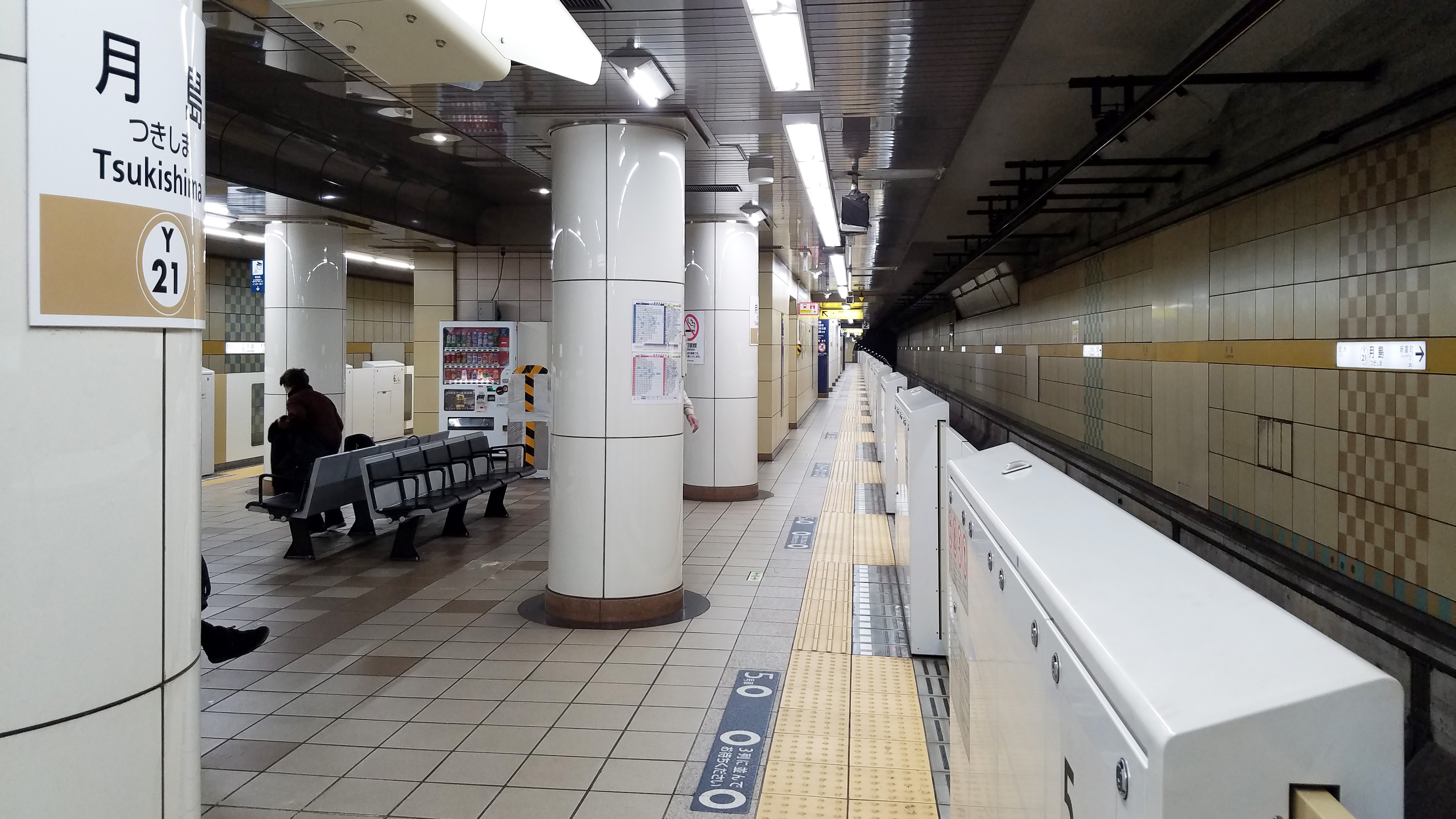
Yurakucho Line platforms, 2017

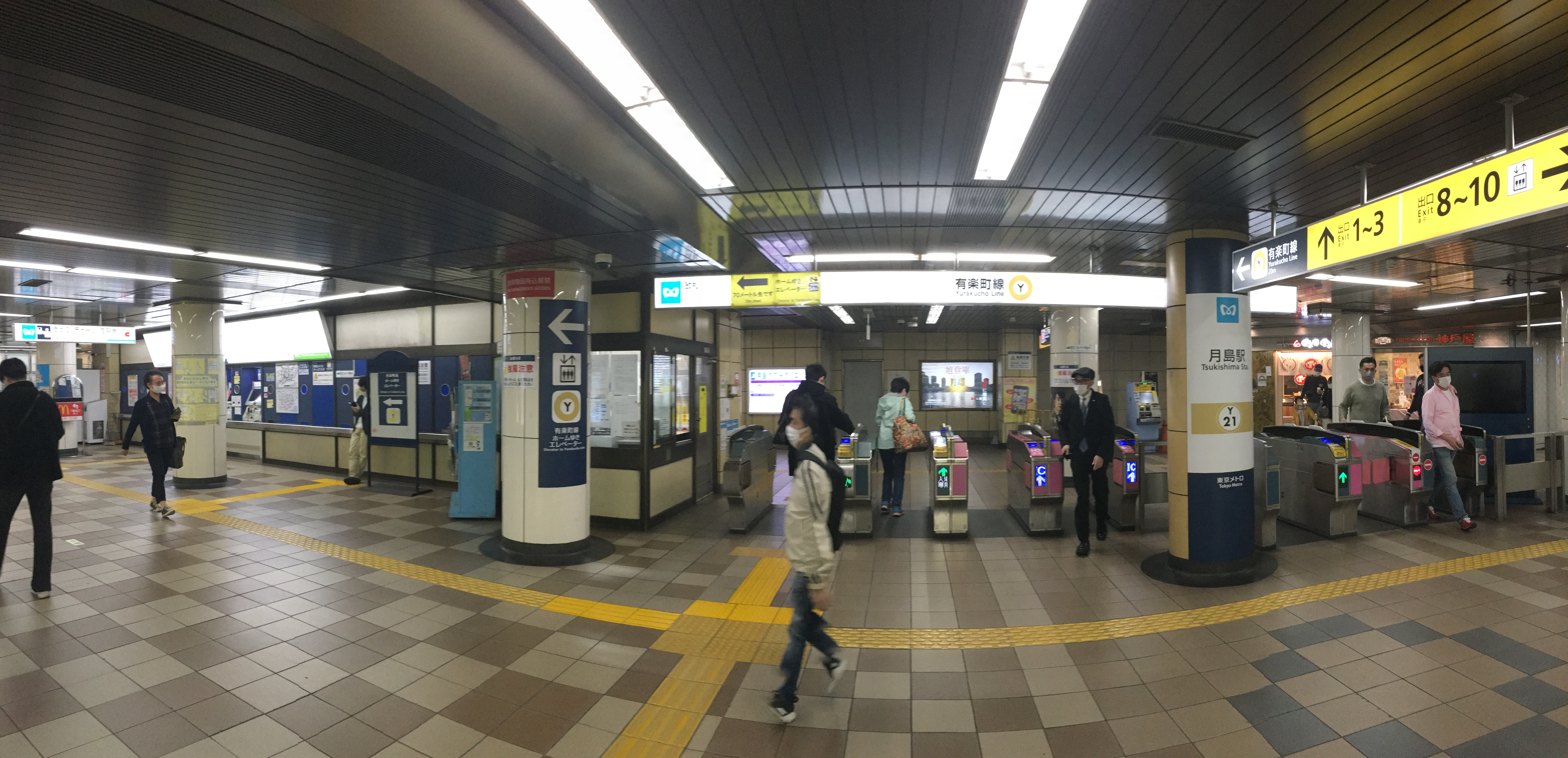
Yurakucho Line ticket gates, 2020

=== Toei ===
The Toei portion of the station is composed of a single island platform serving two tracks.

1	Ōedo Line	for Ryōgoku, Iidabashi, and Higashi-shinjuku
2	Ōedo Line	for Daimon, Roppongi, Tochomae, and Hikarigaoka

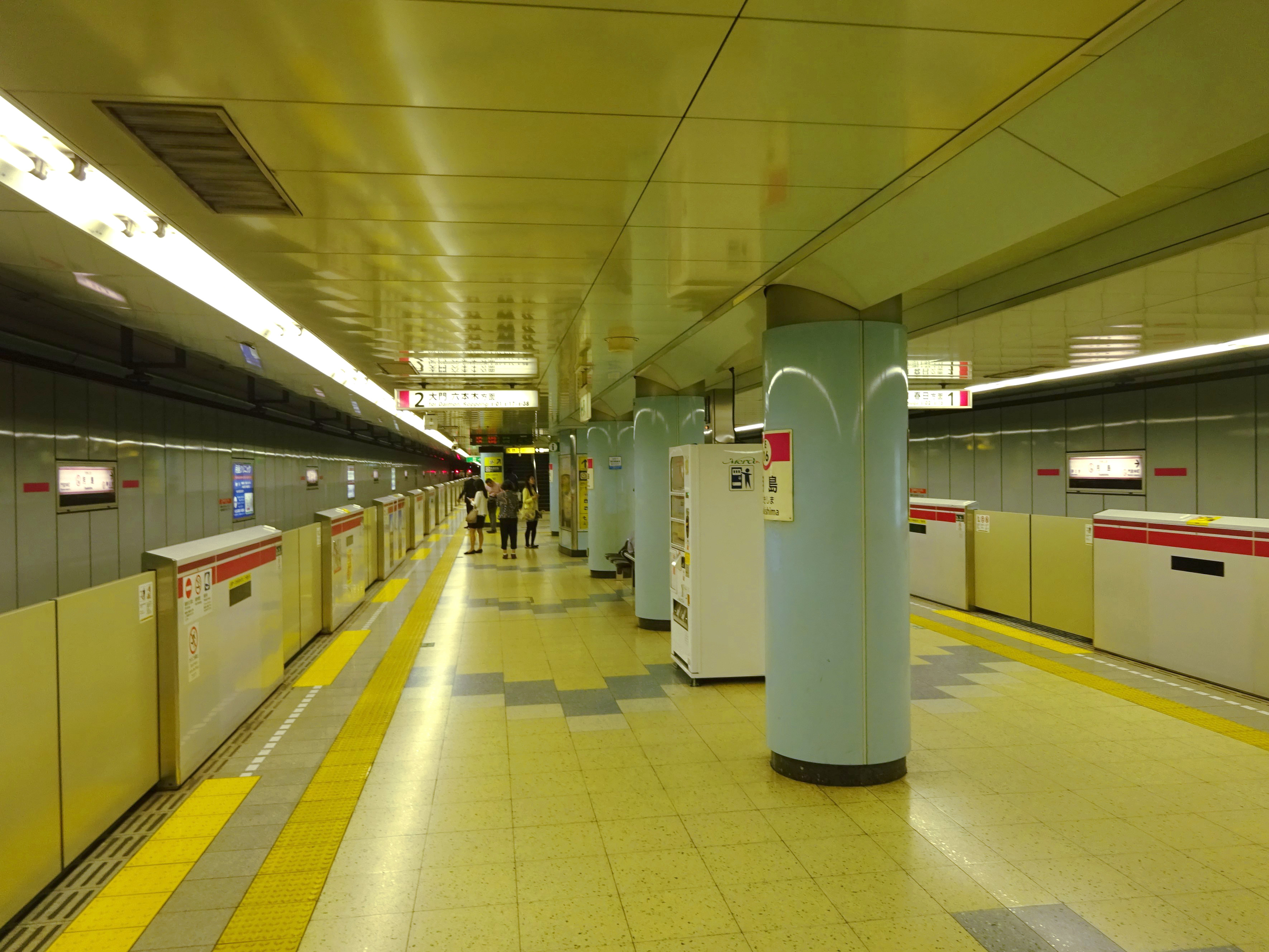
Oedo Line platforms, 2016

== History ==
The station was opened on 8 June 1988 by the Teito Rapid Transit Authority (TRTA). The Toei Oedo Line platforms opened on 12 December 2000.

== See also ==
- List of railway stations in Japan
