= Outrage Girl Shiomi =

Japanese manga series

- First tankōbon volume cover, featuring Gen Shiomi

指定暴力少女 しおみちゃん (Shitei Bōryoku Shōjo Shiomi-chan)
- Manga
- Written by: Kazurou Inoue
- Published by: Shogakukan
- Imprint: Shōnen Sunday Comics
- Magazine: Shōnen Sunday S
- Original run: May 25, 2016 – October 25, 2018
- Volumes: 5

Outrage Girl Shiomi (Japanese: 指定暴力少女 しおみちゃん, Hepburn: Shitei Bōryoku Shōjo Shiomi-chan) is a Japanese manga series written and illustrated by Kazurou Inoue. It was published by Shogakukan in the magazine Shōnen Sunday S from May 2016 to October 2018, with its chapters collected in five tankōbon volumes. The series follows mob boss Shiomi who one day must go into hiding to protect their life from potential assassins. Opting to get plastic surgery, only to end up looking like a teenage girl, they resolve to stay like this until their life is no longer in danger.

== Characters ==
Gen Shiomi (元 塩見, Shiomi Gen)
A 56-year-old leader of the Hitotsubashi crime group, who, thanks to plastic surgery, turned into a schoolgirl. In the guise of a girl, she uses the pseudonym Shiomi Iwao (塩見 巌, Iwao Shiomi). The basis of the new appearance of Shiomi, the surgeon who worked with him took the appearance of a famous idol and now this idol and Shiomi are similar as two drops of water. This causes additional problems for Shiomi, who tries not to attract too much attention. Despite the fact that Shiomi was turned into a girl, they still retain the physical strength of a seasoned bandit. Also, despite their attempts to impersonate a child, Shiomi's gangster habits often make themselves felt.
Tatsuya Umemiya
A classmate of Shiomi named for Tatsuo Umemiya, who in the past saved him from the police, and later himself saved by Shiomi from school hooligans. Tatsuya is in love with the female version of Shiomi and does not hide his feelings, however, he does not meet reciprocity.

== Publication ==
Written and illustrated by Kazurou Inoue, Outrage Girl Shiomi was serialized in Shogakukan's shōnen manga magazine Shōnen Sunday S from May 25, 2016, to October 25, 2018. Its chapters were collected in five tankōbon volumes, released from February 10, 2017, to January 11, 2019.

=== Volumes ===
No.	Japanese release date	Japanese ISBN
1	February 10, 2017	978-4-09-1274915
2	May 12, 2017	978-4-09-1276117
3	November 10, 2017	978-4-09-1278937
4	June 12, 2018	978-4-09-128223-1
5	January 11, 2019	978-4-09-128812-7
