= Nishi-Shinjuku Station =

Metro station in Tokyo, Japan

Coordinates: 35.694493°N 139.692546°E

Nishi-shinjuku Station 西新宿駅

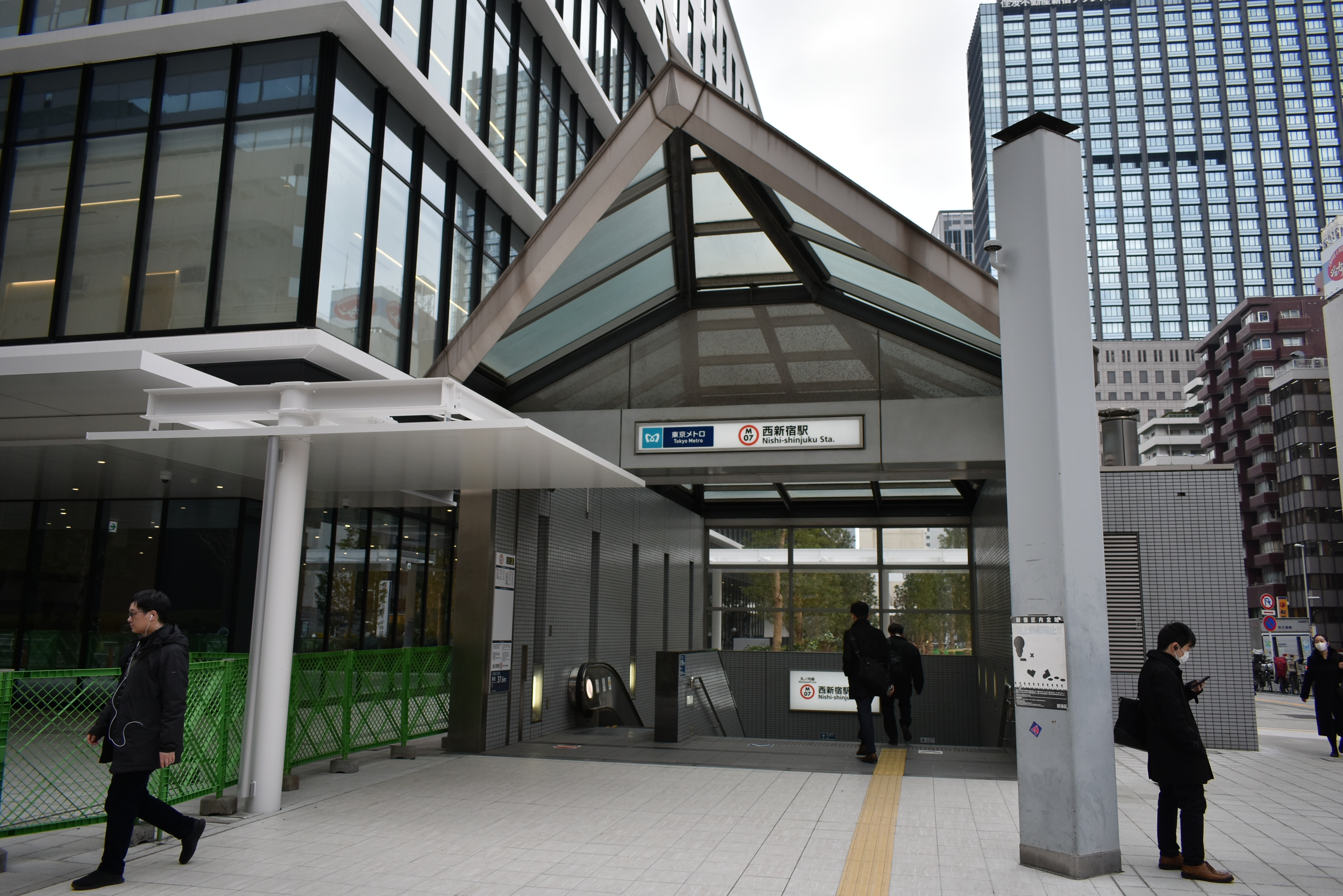
- Exit in 2019

General information
- Location: Shinjuku, Tokyo; Japan
- Operator: Tokyo Metro
- Line: Marunouchi Line
- Platforms: 2 side platforms
- Tracks: 2

Construction
- Structure type: Underground

Other information
- Station code: M-07

History
- Opened: 28 May 1996; 30 years ago

Services
Preceding station	Tokyo Metro	Following station
Nakano-sakaue towards Ogikubo or Hōnanchō	Marunouchi Line	Shinjuku towards Ikebukuro
Location
- Location within Tokyo Yamanote Loop Location within Tokyo wards area Location within Japan

Nishi-shinjuku Station (西新宿駅, Nishi-shinjuku-eki) is a Tokyo Metro railway station in Shinjuku, Tokyo, Japan. It is on the Tokyo Metro Marunouchi Line and is numbered M-07.

== Lines ==
Nishi-shinjuku Station is served by the Marunouchi Line, and is numbered M-07.

== Station layout ==
The station has two side platforms serving two tracks.

=== Platforms ===
1	Marunouchi Line	for Ogikubo and Hōnanchō
2	Marunouchi Line	for Shinjuku, Ginza, and Ikebukuro

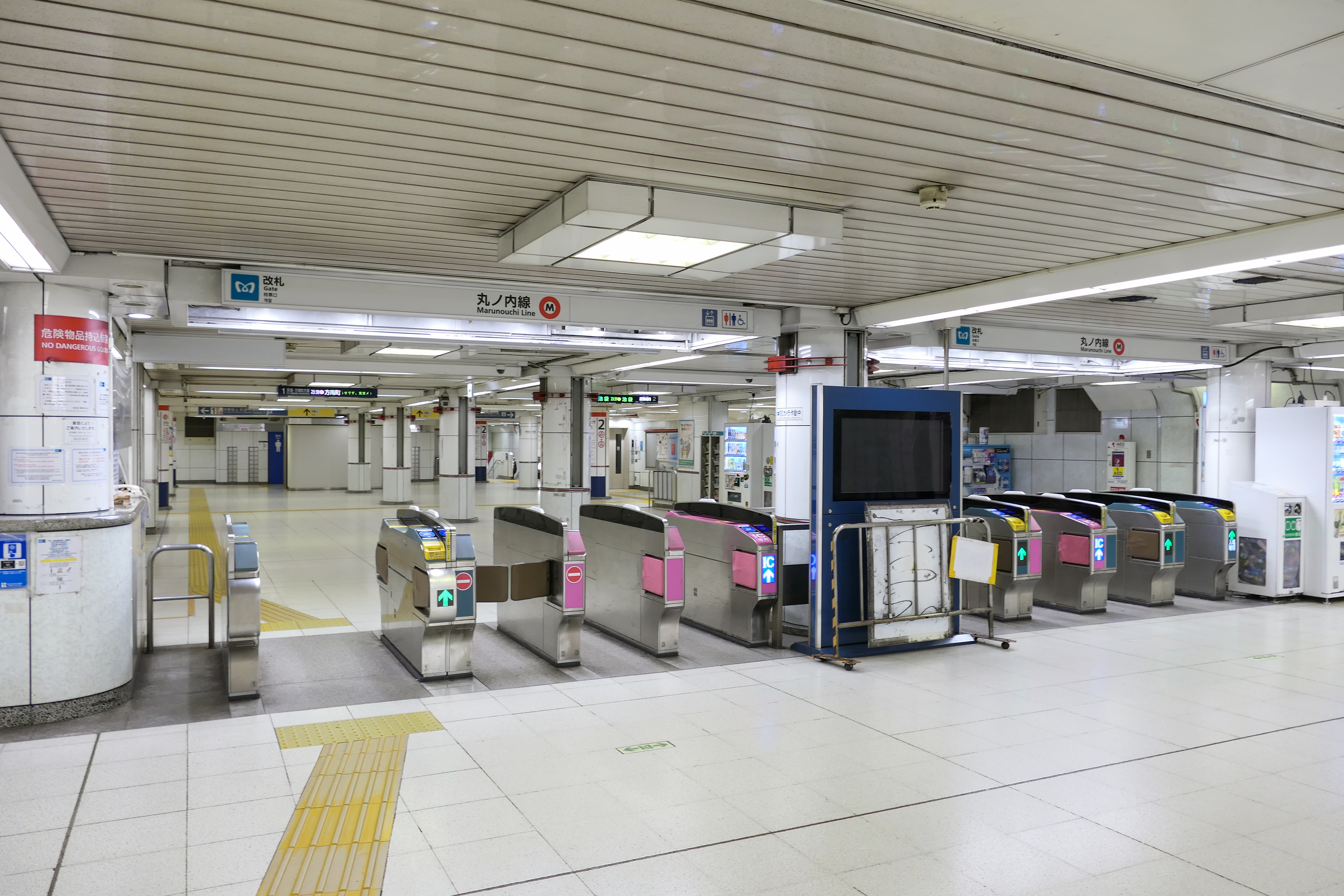
Ticket gate in 2023

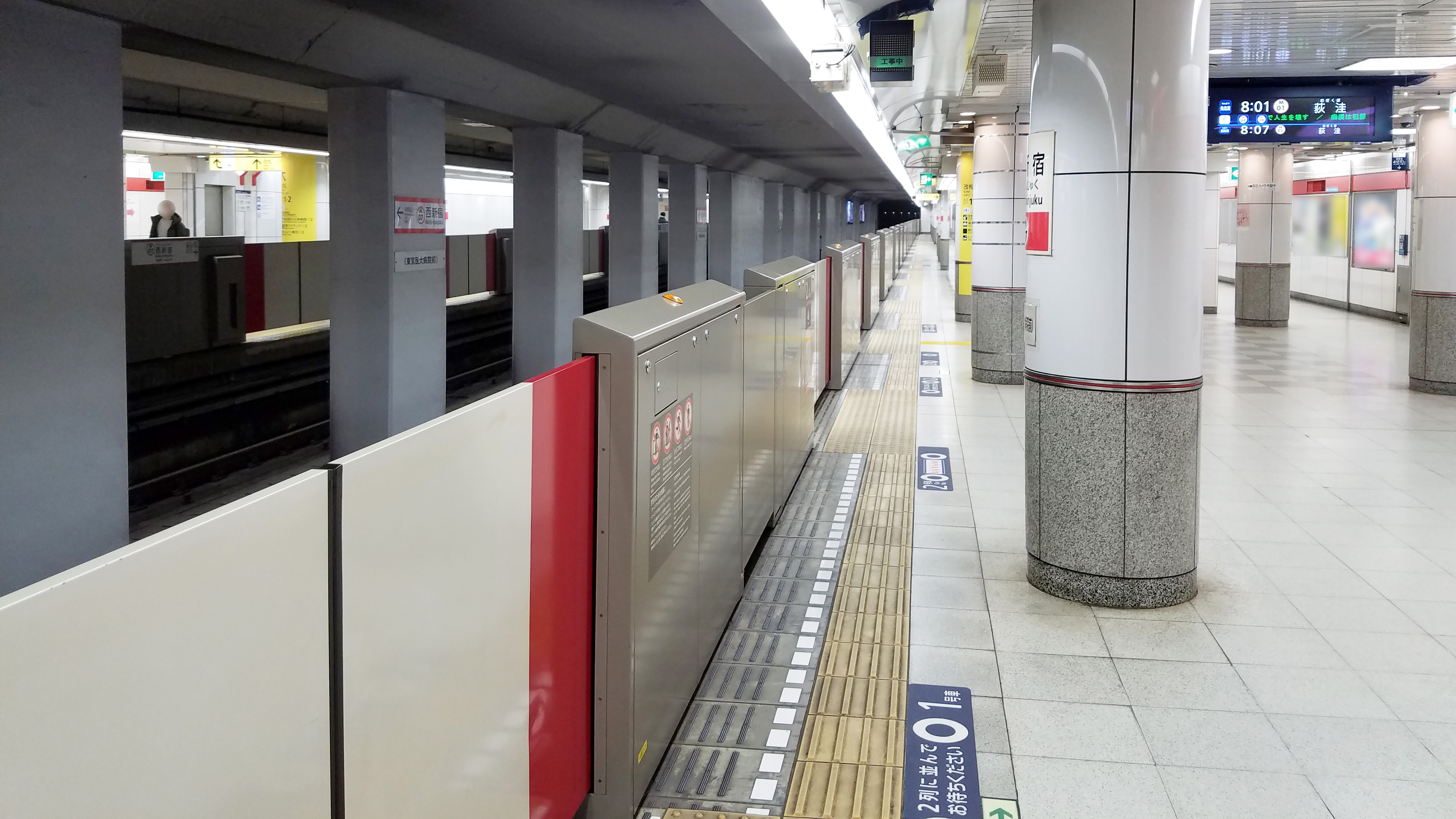
Platform in 2019

== History ==
Nishi-shinjuku Station opened on 28 May 1996.

The station facilities were inherited by Tokyo Metro after the privatization of the Teito Rapid Transit Authority (TRTA) in 2004.

== Surrounding area ==
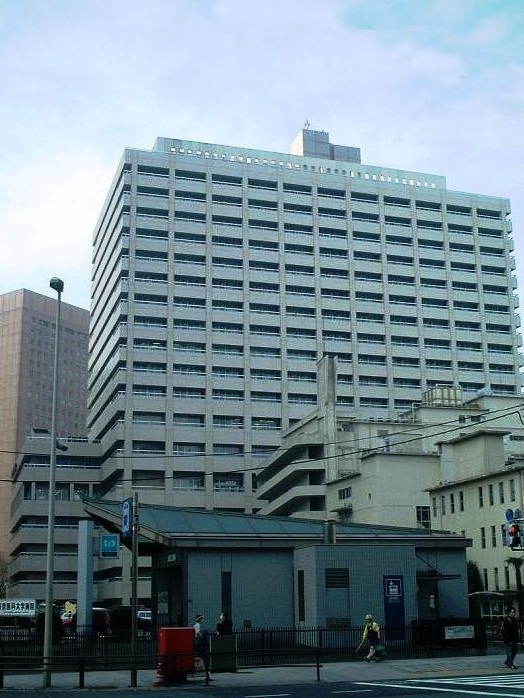
The entrance of the station and Tokyo Medical University Hospital

- Tokyo Medical University Hospital
- Tochōmae Station (Toei Ōedo Line)
- Shinjuku Police Hall
- Kogakuin University
