= Kenichi Yoshizumi =

Japanese politician

- 吉住 健一

Mayor of Shinjuku
- Incumbent
- Assumed office 24 November 2014
- Preceded by: Hiroko Nakayama

Member of the Tokyo Metropolitan Assembly
- In office 23 July 2009 – 2014
- Constituency: Shinjuku Ward

Member of the Shinjuku City Assembly
- In office 1 May 2003 – 2009

Personal details
- Born: 22 April 1972 (age 54) Ōkubo, Tokyo, Japan
- Party: Independent
- Education: Nihon University

Kenichi Yoshizumi (吉住 健一, Yoshizumi Ken'ichi; born 22 April 1972) is a Japanese politician serving as the current mayor of Shinjuku, one of the special wards of Tokyo, since 2014.

== Biography ==
Yoshizumi grew up in Shinjuku, attending Ōkubo Elementary School, Toyama Junior High School, and Hiroo Senior High School. He graduated from the law faculty of Nihon University in 1996, and began his political career as a secretary for Diet member Kaoru Yosano.

Yoshizumi was elected to the Shinjuku municipal assembly in 2003 and re-elected in 2007. He was then elected to the Tokyo metropolitan assembly in 2009 and re-elected in 2013. He became mayor of Shinjuku in November 2014.

While Yoshizumi is currently not affiliated with a political party in his capacity as mayor, he has been supported by the Liberal Democratic Party, which he officially represented in the municipal and metropolitan assemblies. His LDP supporters include Miki Yamada, Keizo Takemi, Masaharu Nakagawa and Tamayo Marukawa.

In 2015, Yoshizumi named Godzilla as the official "tourism ambassador" of Shinjuku in connection with the opening of the new Toho commercial complex in Kabukicho, which features a prominent Godzilla statue. Yoshizumi called the character "the pride of Japan." In 2016, Yoshizumi presided over the introduction of public bicycle rental service in Shinjuku.
