= Shinjuku =

Shinjuku 新宿区
- Special ward
- Shinjuku City
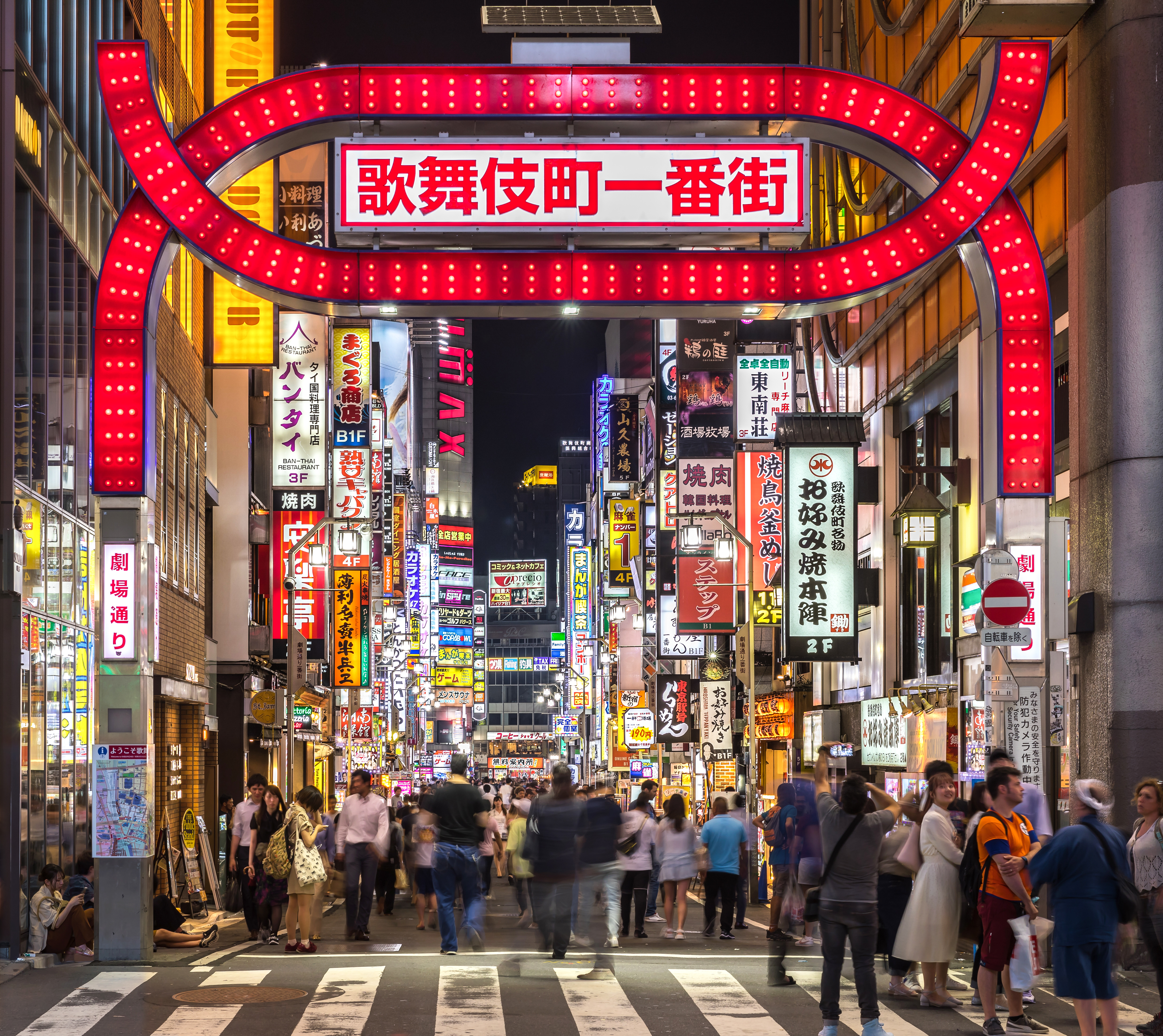
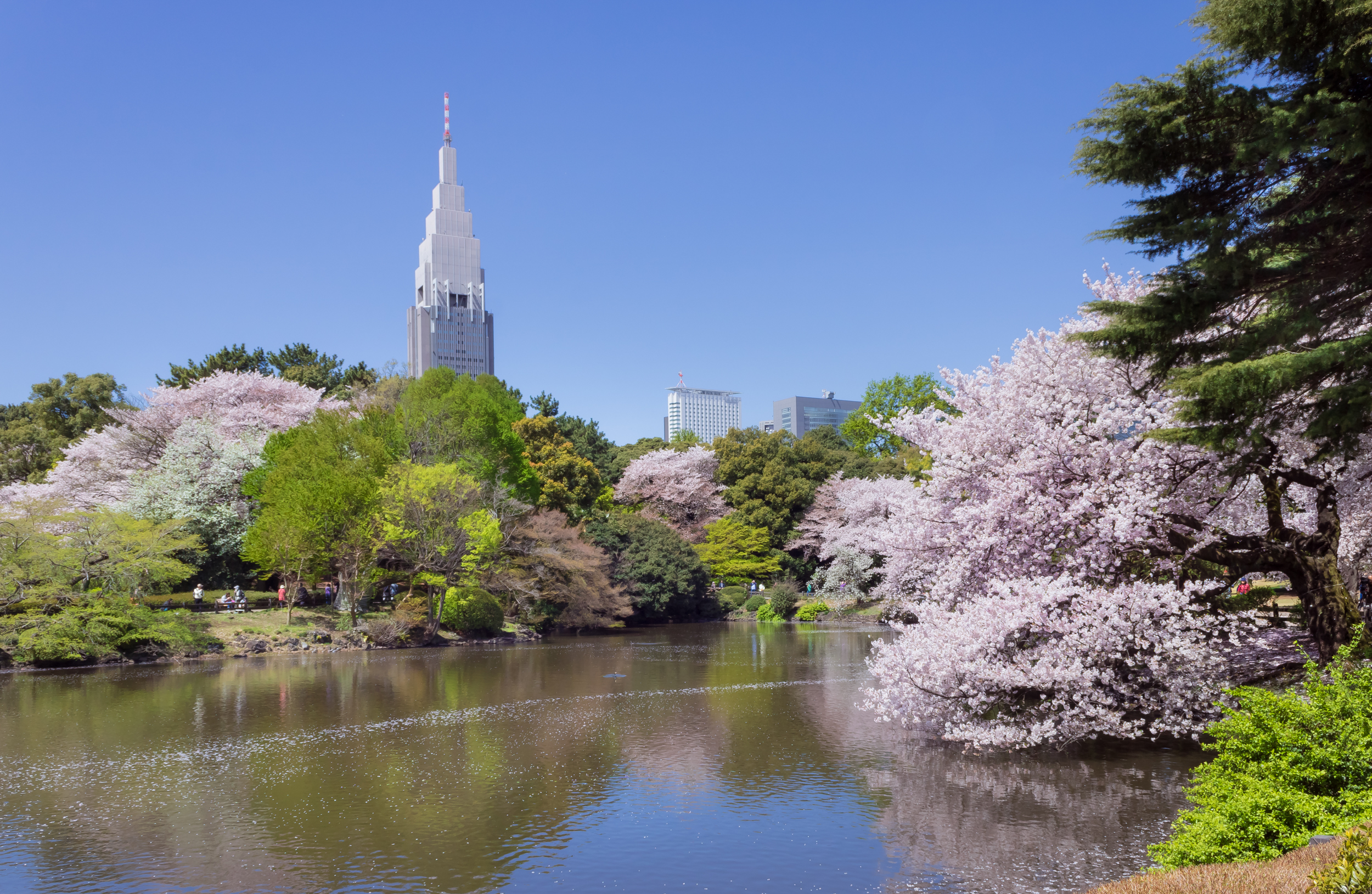
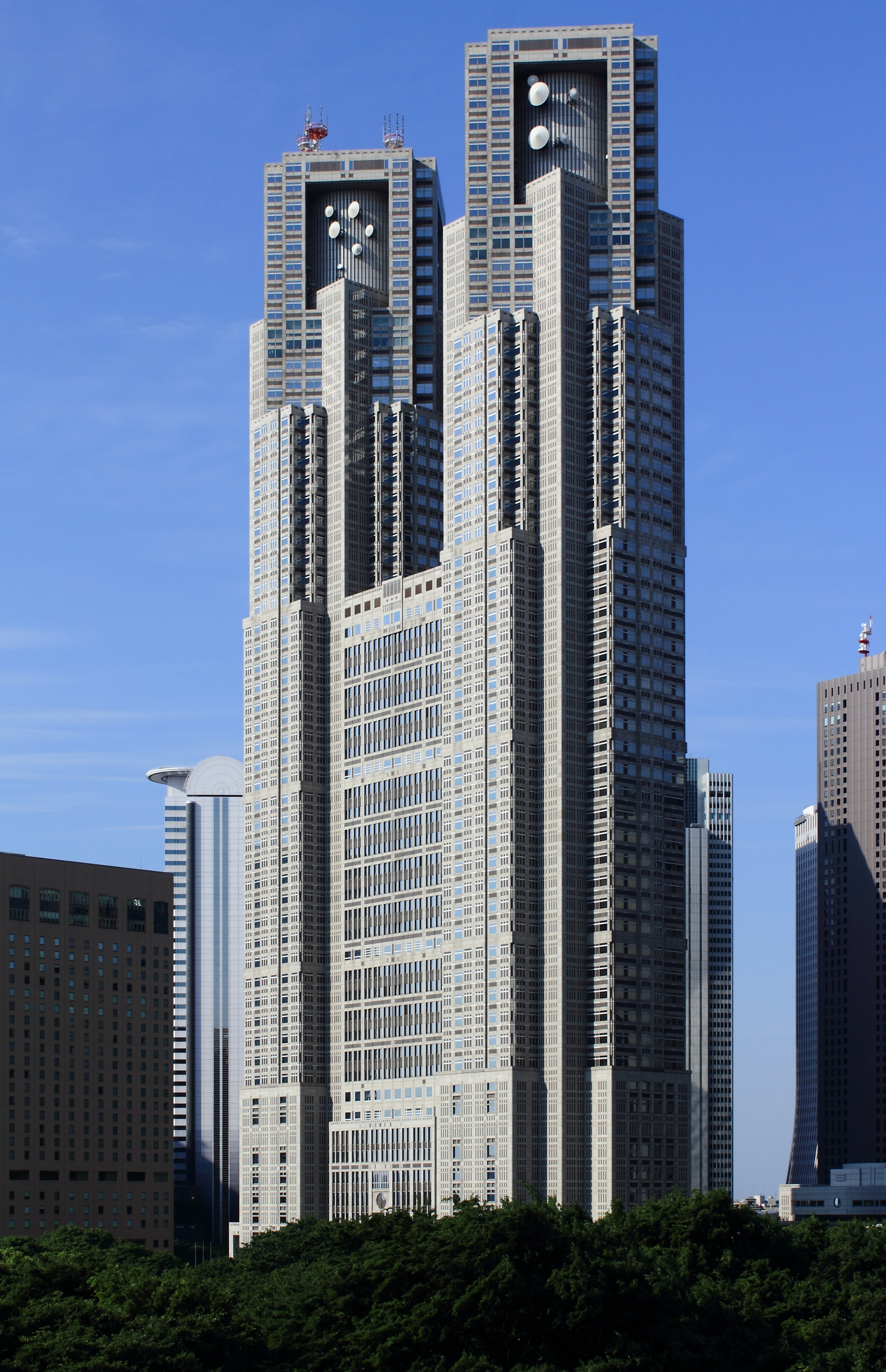
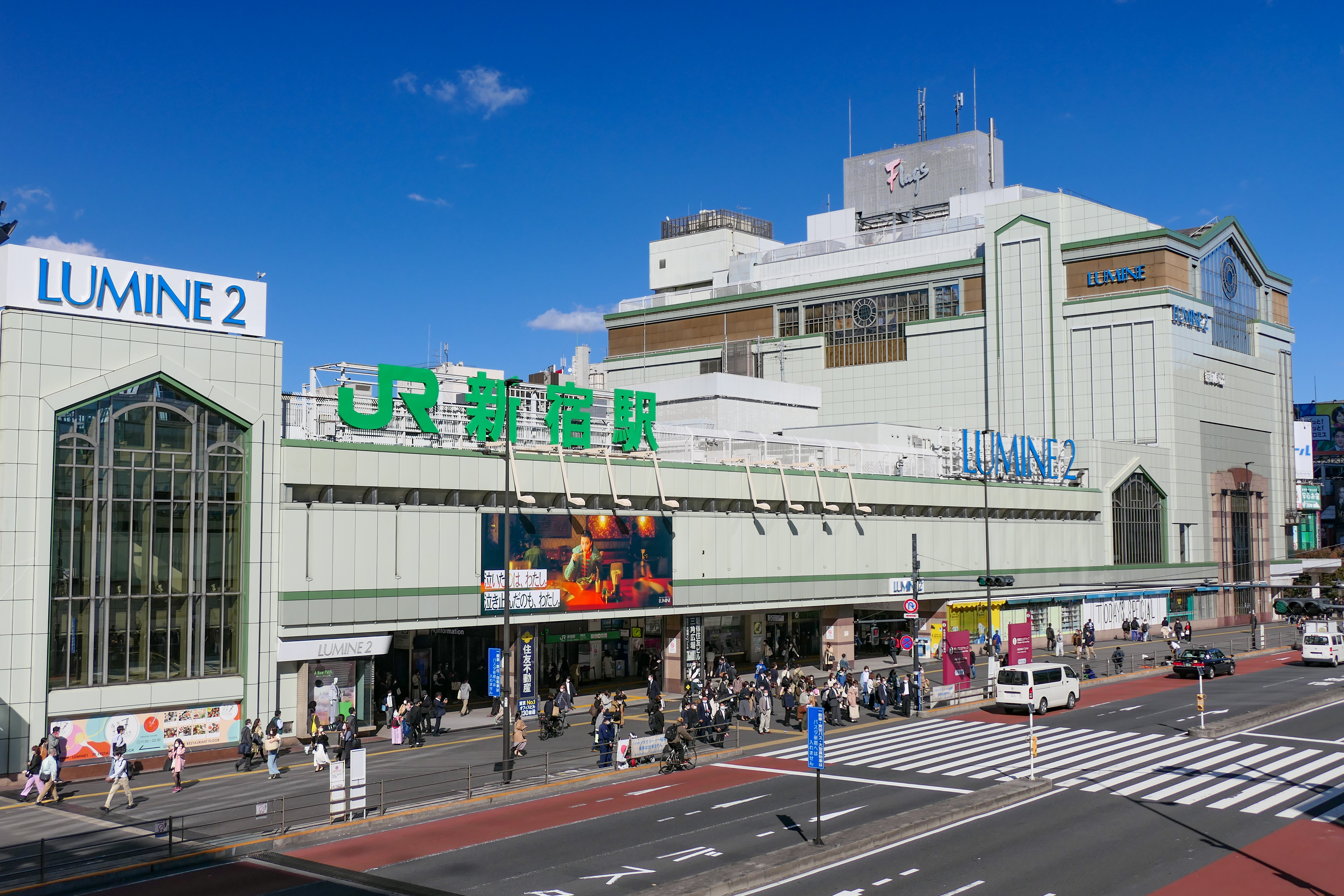
- Nishi-Shinjuku Kabukichō Shinjuku Gyo-en National Garden Tokyo Metropolitan Government Building Shinjuku Station (South Entrance)

- Flag Seal

- Location of Shinjuku in Tokyo

- Coordinates: 35°42′5″N 139°42′35″E
- Country: Japan
- Region: Kantō
- Prefecture: Tokyo

Government
  - Mayor: Kenichi Yoshizumi
  - Tourism Ambassador: Godzilla

Area
  - Total: 18.23 km^{2} (7.04 sq mi)

Population (1 October 2020)
  - Total: 349,385
  - Density: 19,170/km^{2} (49,640/sq mi)
- Time zone: UTC+9 (Japan Standard Time)
- Tree: Zelkova serrata
- Flower: Azalea
- Phone number: 03-3209-1111
- City Hall Address: Kabukichō 1-4-1, Shinjuku-ku, Tokyo 160-8484
- Website: www.city.shinjuku.lg.jp

Shinjuku (Japanese: 新宿区, Hepburn: Shinjuku-ku; [ɕìɲ̟́.ɟ̟͡ʑɨ́.kɯ̈́, -kɯ̥̈.kɯ̈̀, ɕíɲ̟́-]), officially called Shinjuku City, is one of the 23 special wards of Tokyo.

Since the end of World War II, Shinjuku has become a major secondary center of Tokyo (fukutoshin), rivaling the original city center in Marunouchi. Today, it is a major commercial and administrative center and houses the northern half of Shinjuku Station, the busiest railway station in the world, as well as the Tokyo Metropolitan Government Building, the administrative center of the Tokyo Metropolitan Government.

As of 2025, the ward has an estimated population of 355,981, living in a total area of 18.23 km^{2}.

== History ==
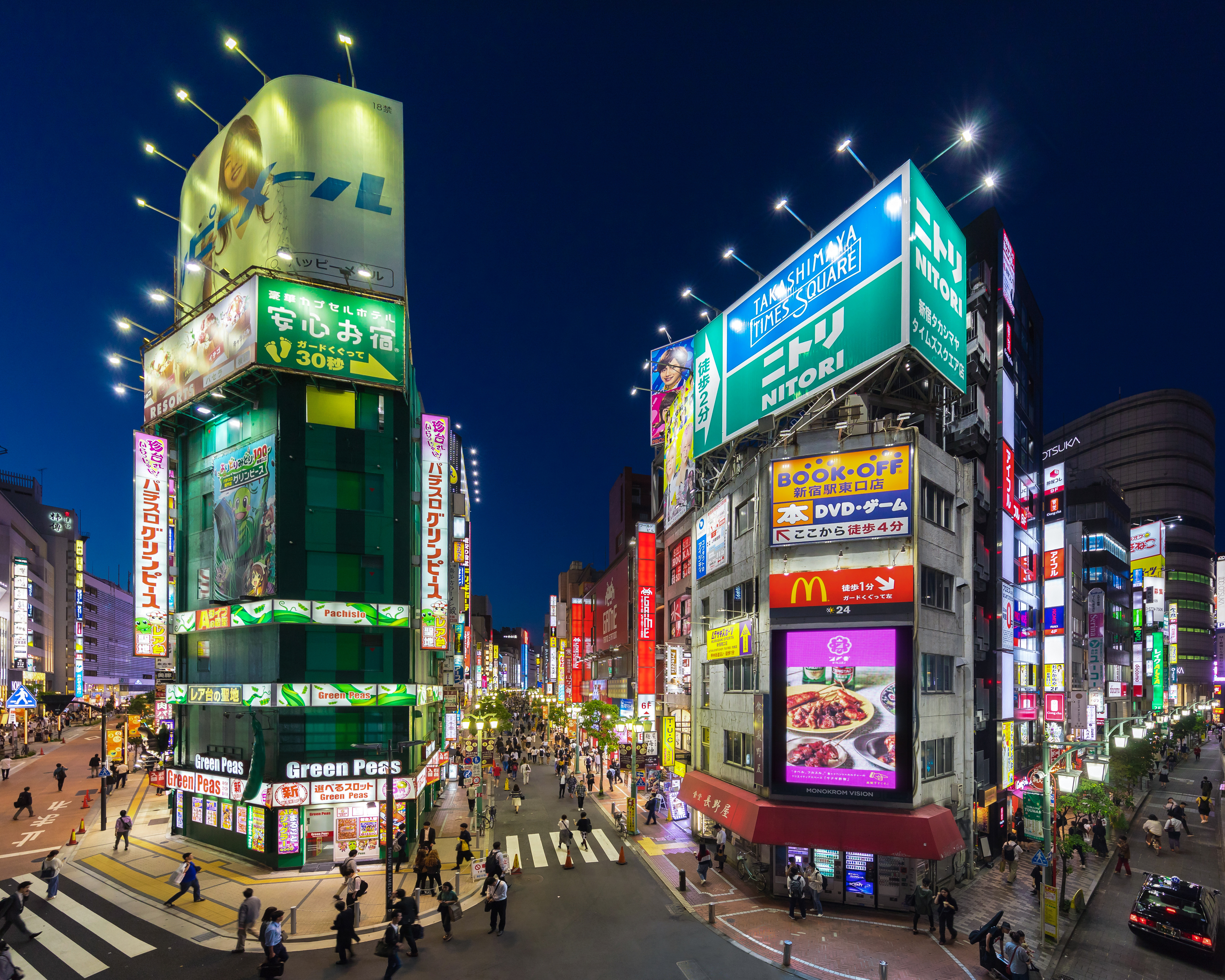
Shinjuku at night

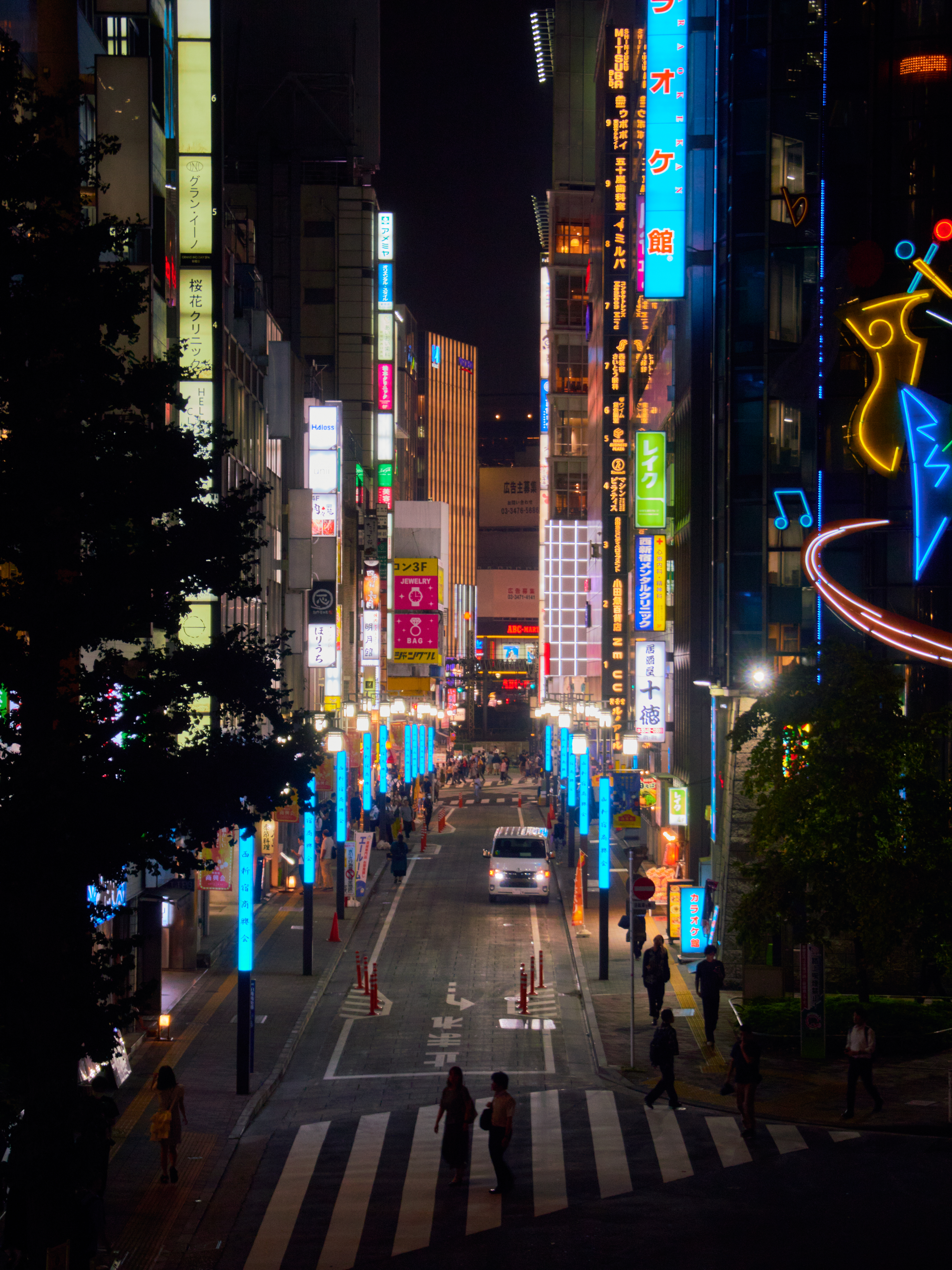
A commercial street in Shinjuku at night.

In 1634, during the Edo period, as the outer moat of the Edo Castle was built, a number of temples and shrines moved to the Yotsuya area on the western edge of Shinjuku. In 1698, Naitō-Shinjuku had developed as a new (shin) station (shuku or juku) on the Kōshū Kaidō, one of the major highways of that era. Naitō was the family name of a daimyō whose mansion stood in the area; his land is now a public park, the Shinjuku Gyoen. In 1898, the Yodobashi Water Purification Plant, the city's first modern water treatment facility, was built in the area that is now between the park and the train station.

In 1920, the town of Naitō-Shinjuku, which comprised large parts of present-day Shinjuku (the neighborhood, not the municipality), parts of Nishi-Shinjuku and Kabukichō were integrated into Tokyo City. Shinjuku began to develop into its current form after the Great Kantō Earthquake in 1923, since the seismically stable area largely escaped the devastation. Consequently, West Shinjuku is one of the few areas in Tokyo with many skyscrapers.

The Tokyo air raids from May to August 1945 destroyed almost 90% of the buildings in the area in and around Shinjuku Station. The pre-war form of Shinjuku and the rest of Tokyo was retained after the war because the roads and rails, damaged as they were, remained, and these formed the heart of Shinjuku in the post-war construction. Only in Kabuki-cho was a grand reconstruction plan put into action.

The present ward was established on March 15, 1947 with the merger of the former wards of Yotsuya, Ushigome, and Yodobashi. It served as part of the athletics 50 km walk and marathon course during the 1964 Summer Olympics. In March 1965, the Yodobashi Water Purification Plant closed and was replaced by skyscrapers in the following years.

=== The sixties in Shinjuku ===
Shinjuku was the epicenter of new ideas and artistic avant-gardes in Tokyo in the 1960s, much like Greenwich Village in New York.

==== Cinema ====
The young directors of the Japanese New Wave used Shinjuku as the setting for several of their films, such as Nagisa Oshima's Diary of a Shinjuku Thief (1969), Koji Wakamatsu's Shinjuku Mad (screenplay by Masao Adachi), and Funeral Parade of Roses by Toshio Matsumoto.

In 1967, the Art Theatre Guild opened the Scorpio Theatre (Sasori-za) in the basement of its Art Theatre Shinjuku Bunka cinema. The Scorpio Theatre quickly established itself as an influential underground venue for angura theater, music, dance, and film. Its name, proposed by novelist Yukio Mishima, was inspired by Kenneth Anger's film Scorpio Rising (1963). It was at the Sasori-za that Mishima held the first screening of his film Patriotism (1966).

==== Theater ====
In 1967, the Modern Art Theater was opened in Shinjuku. Dubbed the "sensational cave," it offered nude shows, avant-garde and entertainment theater, film screenings, and performances. The theater laboratory "Ceiling Pier", which had Tadanori Yokoo as a founding member, also performed there. After the underground boom, the venue was used for striptease performances.

It was in Shinjuku, in the Hanazono shrine, that the first performances of the "Red Tent" (Jokyo Gekijo), the company founded by Juro Kara, took place.

Tatsumi Hijikata and the buto dancers were also closely associated to Shinjuku.

==== Places ====
Cafe Fugetsudo, founded by actor Goro Yokoyama, was a rallying point for artists, intellectuals, and homosexuals in the 1960s. Actor Takeshi Kitano, painter Taro Okamoto, transvestite actress Akihiro Miwa, poet Gozo Yoshimasu, and filmmaker Shuji Terayama frequented it.

In the Golden Gai, a small block located east of Kabukicho, many bars have been haunts of artists and protesters.

==== Folk guerilla concerts ====
In 1969, anti-war group Beheiren organized folk concerts in Shinjuku station. A batch of Japanese anti-Vietnam War activists gathered and were termed "folk guerrillas". In July, a fight with riot police led to the dispersal of the concerts and the arrests of musicians.

==== Demonstrations ====
On October 21, 1969, an International Anti-War Day demonstration was violently suppressed, so much so that the daily newspaper Asahi ran the following day's headline: "Guerrilla Warfare in the Heart of Shinjuku."

In 1991, the Tokyo Metropolitan Government moved from the Marunouchi district of Chiyoda to the current building in Shinjuku (the Tokyo International Forum stands at the former site vacated by the government).

== Geography ==
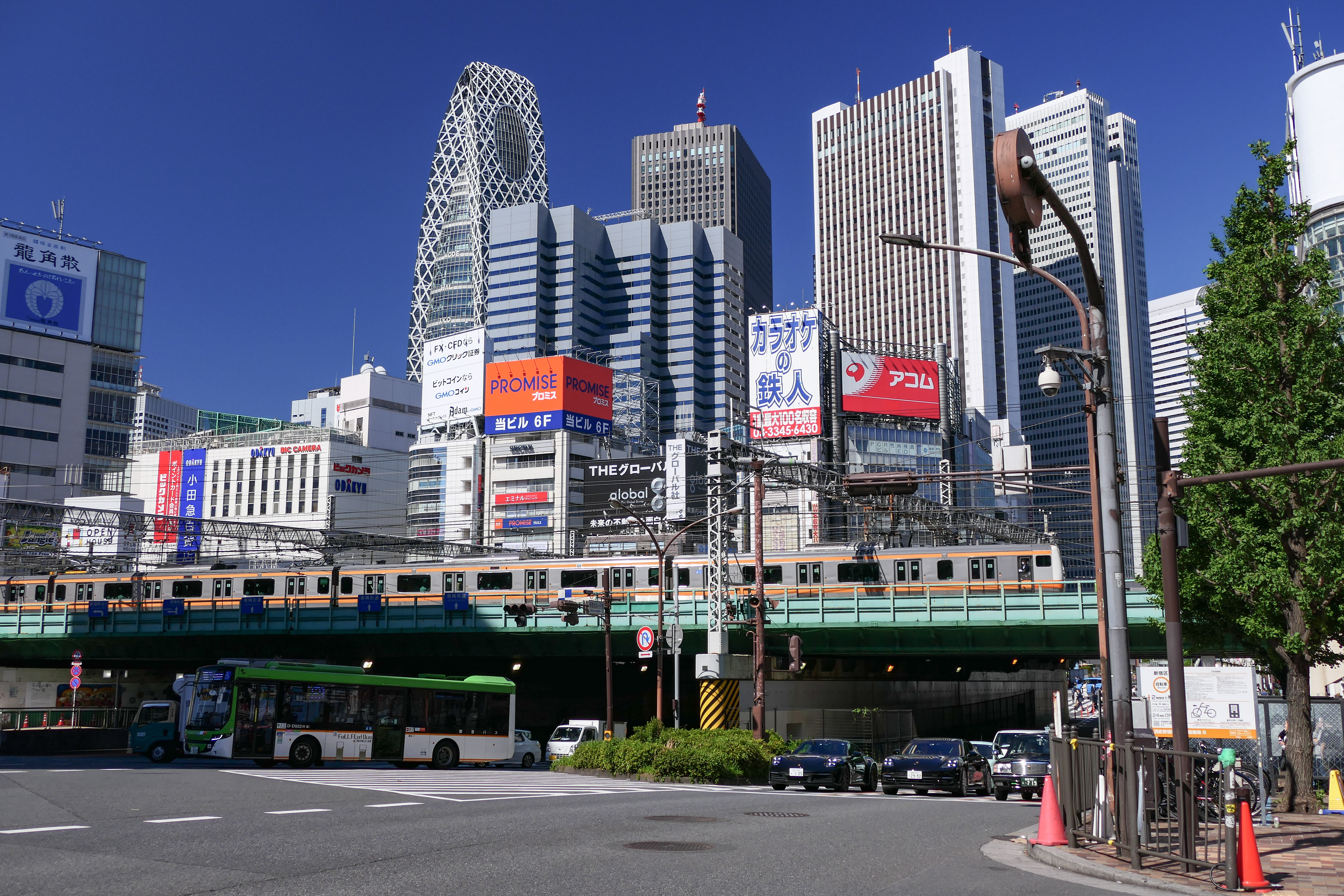
Shinjuku office buildings

Most of Shinjuku is occupied by the Yodobashi Plateau, the most elevated portion of which extends through most of the Shinjuku Station area. The Kanda River runs through the Ochiai and Totsuka areas near sea level, but the Toshima Plateau also builds elevation in the northern extremities of Totsuka and Ochiai. The highest point in Shinjuku is Hakone-san in Toyama Park, 44.6 m above sea level.

Shinjuku is surrounded by Chiyoda to the east; Bunkyo and Toshima to the north; Nakano to the west, and Shibuya and Minato to the south.

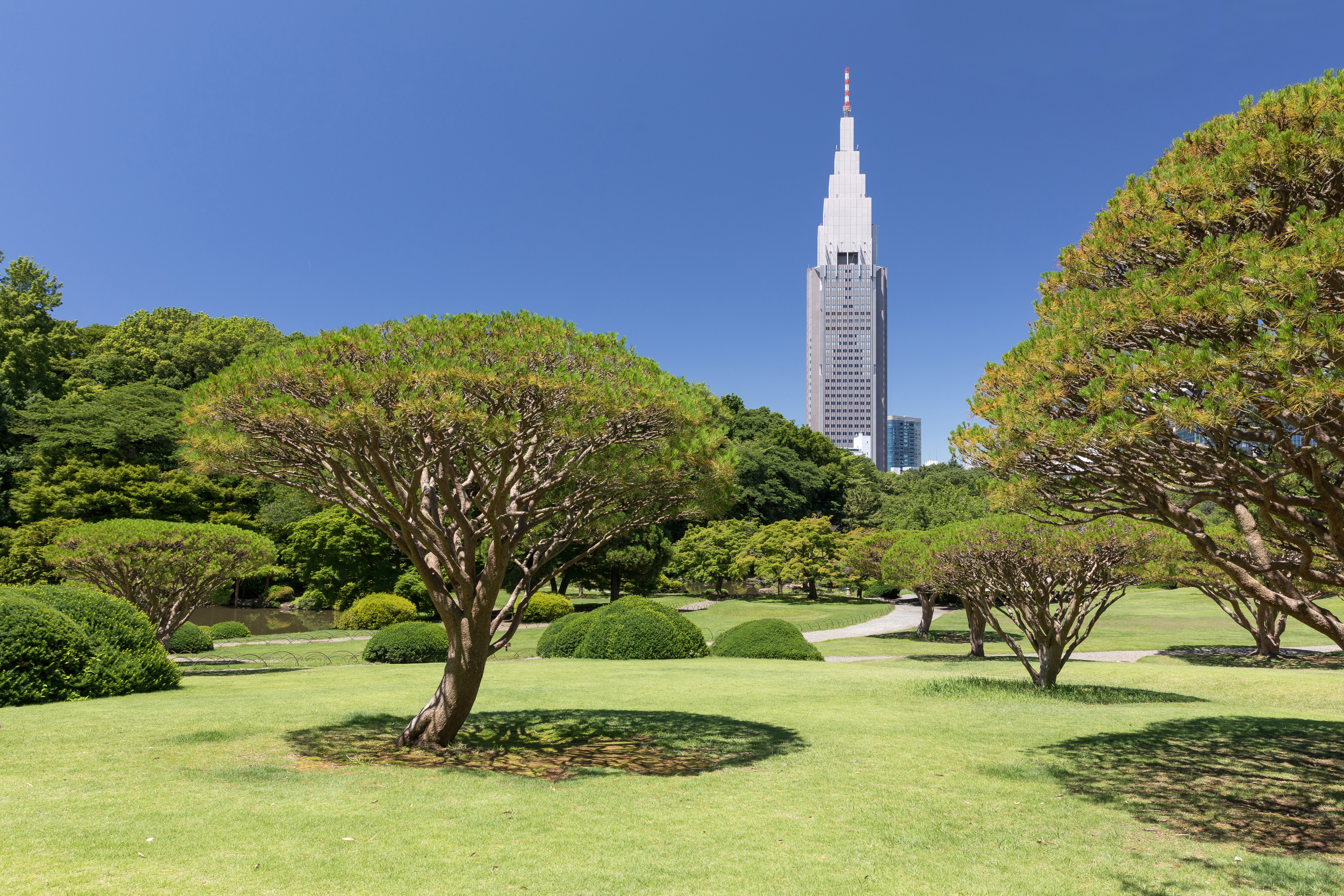
Shinjuku Gyo-en National Garden and NTT DoCoMo Yoyogi Building

The current city of Shinjuku grew out of several separate towns and villages, which have retained some distinctions despite growing together as part of the Tokyo metropolis.

- East Shinjuku : the area east of Shinjuku Station between Higashi-Shinjuku Station and Shinjuku-sanchome Station, historically known as Naito-Shinjuku, houses the city hall and the flagship Isetan department store, as well as several famous districts :
  - Kabukichō: the red-light district, renowned for its variety of bars, restaurants, and sex-related establishments near Seibu-Shinjuku Station.
  - Golden Gai: an area of tiny shanty-style bars and clubs, where musicians, artists, journalists, actors and directors used to gather.
  - Shinjuku Gyo-en: A large park, 58.3 hectares, blending Japanese traditional, English landscape and French formal style gardens.
  - Shinjuku Ni-chōme: Tokyo's best-known gay district.
- Nishi-Shinjuku: The area west of Shinjuku Station, historically known as Yodobashi, is home to Tokyo's largest concentration of skyscrapers. Several of the tallest buildings in Tokyo are located in this area, including the Tokyo Metropolitan Government Building, KDDI Building and Park Tower.

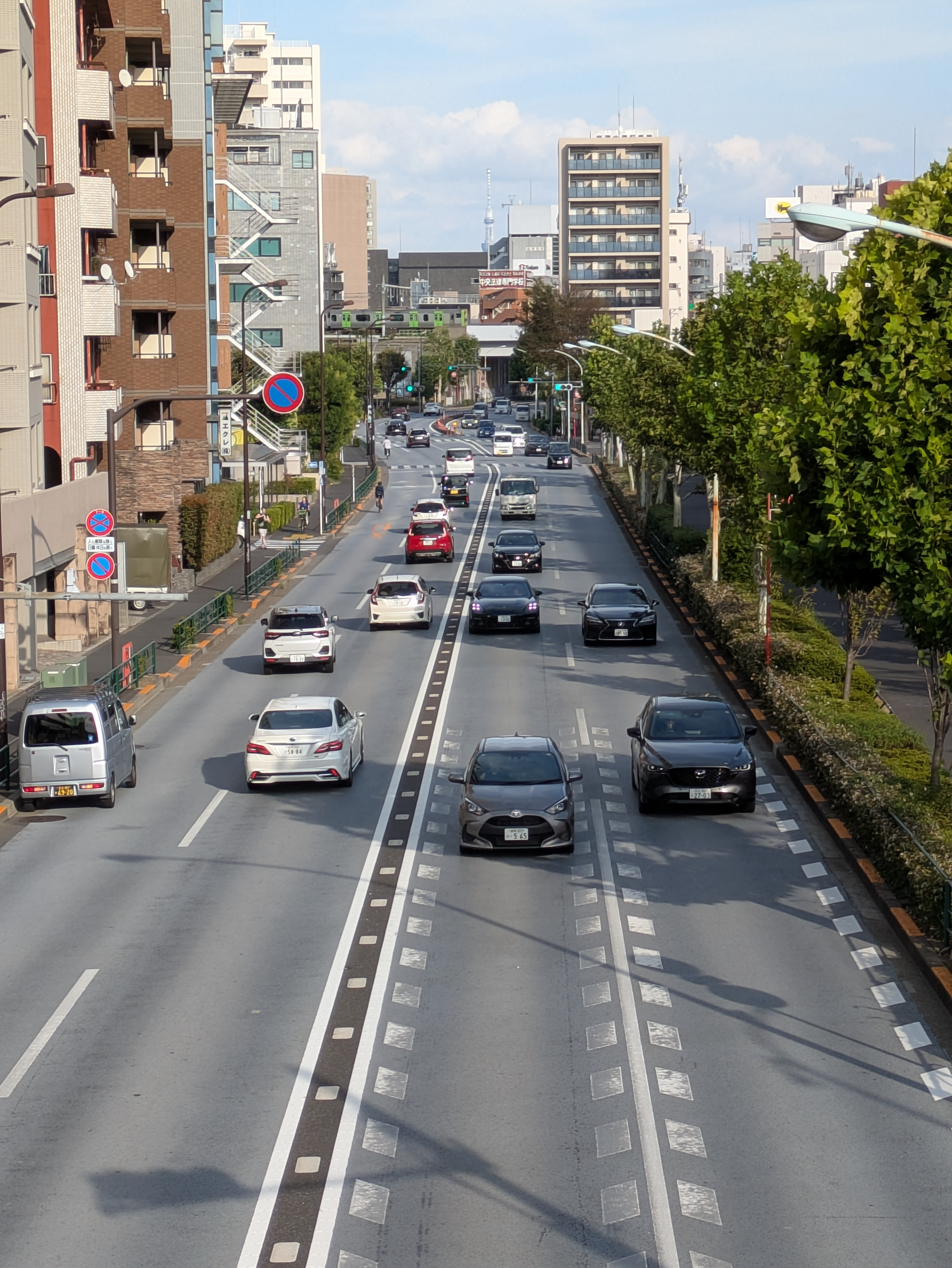
Ochiai area Shinmejiro St.（2025）

- Ochiai: The northwestern corner of Shinjuku, extending to the area around Ochiai-minami-nagasaki Station and the south side of Mejiro Station, is largely residential with a small business district around Nakai Station.
- Ōkubo: The area surrounding Okubo and Shin-Okubo Station is best known as Tokyo's historic ethnic Korean neighborhood.
- Shinanomachi : A district reputed to be the headquarters of a Buddhist organization, which owns many buildings there.
- Totsuka: The northern portion of Shinjuku surrounding Takadanobaba Station and Waseda University, today commonly referred to as Nishi-Waseda. The Takadanobaba area is a major residential and nightlife area for students, as well as a commuter hub.
- Toyama: A largely residential and school area, in the east of Ōkubo and south of Waseda University, extending to the area around Nishi-Waseda Station, Gakushuin Women's College and Toyama Park.
- Ushigome: A largely residential area in the eastern portion of the city.
  - Ichigaya: A commercial area in eastern Shinjuku, site of the Ministry of Defense.
  - Kagurazaka: A hill descending to the Iidabashi Station area, once one of Tokyo's last remaining hanamachi or geisha districts, and currently known for hosting a sizable French community.
- Yotsuya: An upscale residential and commercial district in the southeast corner of Shinjuku. The Arakichō area is well known for its many small restaurants, bars, and izakaya.

"Shinjuku" is often popularly understood to mean the entire area surrounding Shinjuku Station, but the Shinjuku Southern Terrace complex and the areas to the west of the station and south of Kōshū Kaidō are part of the Yoyogi and Sendagaya districts of the special ward of Shibuya.

== Districts and neighborhoods ==
Ushigome Area

- Ageba-chō
- Akagishitamachi
- Akagimotomachi
- Babashitamachi
- Bentenchō
- Enokimachi
- Fukuromachi
- Haraikata-chō
- Haramachi
- Higashienokichō
- Higashigoken-chō
- Ichigayachōenjimachi
- Ichigayadaimachi
- Ichigayafunagawaramachi
- Ichigayahachiman-chō
- Ichigayahonmura-chō
- Ichigayakaga-chō

- Ichigayakōrachō
- Ichigayanakano-chō
- Ichigayasadohara-chō
- Ichigayasanai-chō
- Ichigayata-chō
- Ichigayatakajōmachi
- Ichigayayakuouji-chō
- Ichigayayamabushichō
- Ichigayayanagi-chō
- Iwato-chō
- Kaguragashi
- Kagurazaka
- Kaitaichō
- Kikuichō
- Kitamachi
- Kitayamabushichō
- Kōdachō

- Minamienokichō
- Minamimachi
- Minamiyamabushi-chō
- Nakamachi
- Nakazatochō
- Nandochō
- Nijūkimachi
- Nishigoken-chō
- Nishi-Waseda^{*}
- Saikuchō
- Shimomiyabi-chō
- Shinogawamachi
- Shiroganechō
- Suidōmachi
- Sumiyoshi-chō
- Tansumachi

- Tenjinmachi
- Tomihisa-chō
- Toyama^{*}
- Tsukiji-chō
- Tsukudo-chō
- Tsukudohachimanchō
- Wakamatsumachi
- Wakamiyachō
- Waseda-chō
- Wasedaminamimachi
- Wasedatsurumaki-chō
- Wasedamachi
- Yamabuki-chō
- Yaraimachi
- Yochō-machi^{*}
- Yokoteramachi

Yodobashi Area

- Kamiochiai
- Kitashinjuku
- Nakai
- Nakaochiai
- Ōkubo
- Shimoochiai
- Takadanobaba
- Totsuka-chō
- Nishiochiai
- Nishishinjuku
- Hyakuninmachi
- Kabukichō^{*}
- Shinjuku^{*}
- Toyama^{*}
- Nishi-Waseda^{*}
- Yochō-chō^{*}

Yotsuya Area

- Aizumichō
- Arakimachi
- Daikyōmachi
- Funamachi
- Kabukichō^{*}
- Kasumigaokachō
- Katamachi
- Minamimotomachi
- Naitōchō
- Samonmachi
- Shinanomachi
- Shinjuku^{*}
- Sugamachi
- Wakaba
- Yotsuya
- Yotsuyahonshiochō
- Yotsuyasakamachi
- Yotsuyasaneichō

== Economy ==
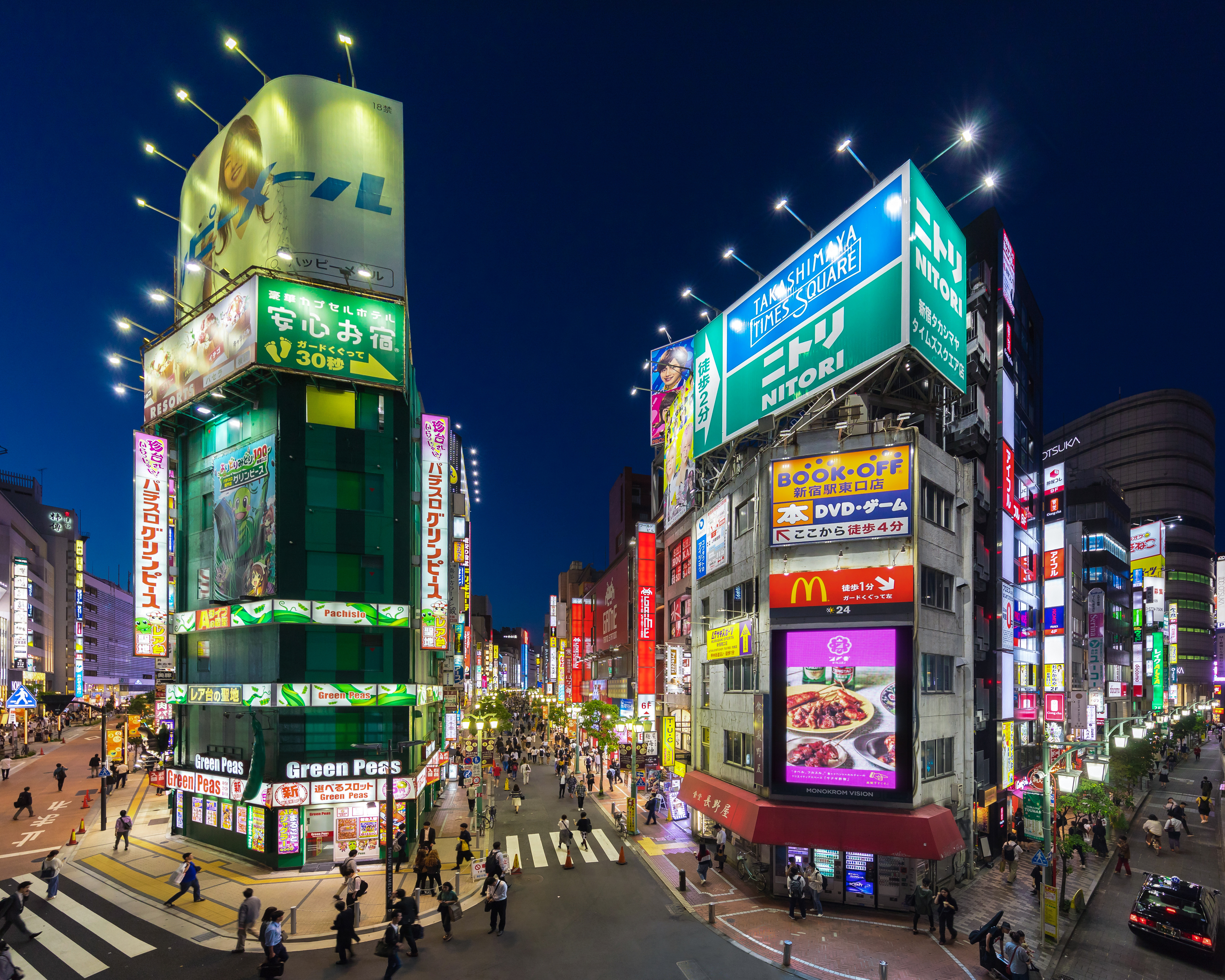
Shinjuku's entertainment district

The area surrounding Shinjuku Station is a major economic hub of Tokyo. Many companies have their headquarters or Tokyo offices in this area, including regional telephone operator NTT East, global camera and medical device manufacturer Olympus Corporation, electronics giant Seiko Epson, video game developer Square Enix, fast food chains McDonald's Japan and Yoshinoya, travel agency H.I.S., Subaru Corporation (Subaru), railway operator Odakyu Electric Railway, construction giants Taisei Corporation and Kumagai Gumi, medical equipment manufacturer Nihon Kohden, Enoki Films, navigation software company Jorudan, instant noodle giant Nissin Foods, automotive components manufacturer Keihin Corporation, and regional airline Airtransse. The station area also hosts numerous major retailers such as Isetan, Takashimaya, Marui, Bic Camera, Yodobashi Camera and Yamada Denki.

Northeastern Shinjuku has an active publishing industry and is home to the publishers Shinchosha and Futabasha. The main store of the Books Kinokuniya bookstore chain is also located in Shinjuku.

== Demographics ==
Resident nationalities
Nationality	Population (percentage) (2024)
Japan	305,943 (86.9%)
China	17,447 (5.0%)
South Korea	9,089 (2.6%)
Nepal	3,838 (1.1%)
Vietnam	2,642 (0.8%)
Myanmar	2,591 (0.7%)
Others	10,159 (2.9%)

By 2012 people of Chinese citizenship became the most numerous foreign citizens in Shinjuku. Previously the most common citizenship was collectively those of North and South Korea.

Historical population
Year	Pop.	±%
1920	290,398	—
1930	357,655	+23.2%
1940	394,480	+10.3%
1945	83,106	−78.9%
1950	246,373	+196.5%
1960	413,690	+67.9%
1970	390,657	−5.6%
1980	343,928	−12.0%
1990	296,790	−13.7%
2000	286,726	−3.4%
2010	326,309	+13.8%
2020	349,385	+7.1%
Source: Censuses (Note: For years prior to 1950, figures cover the area of present-day Shinjuku-ku.)

== Government and politics ==
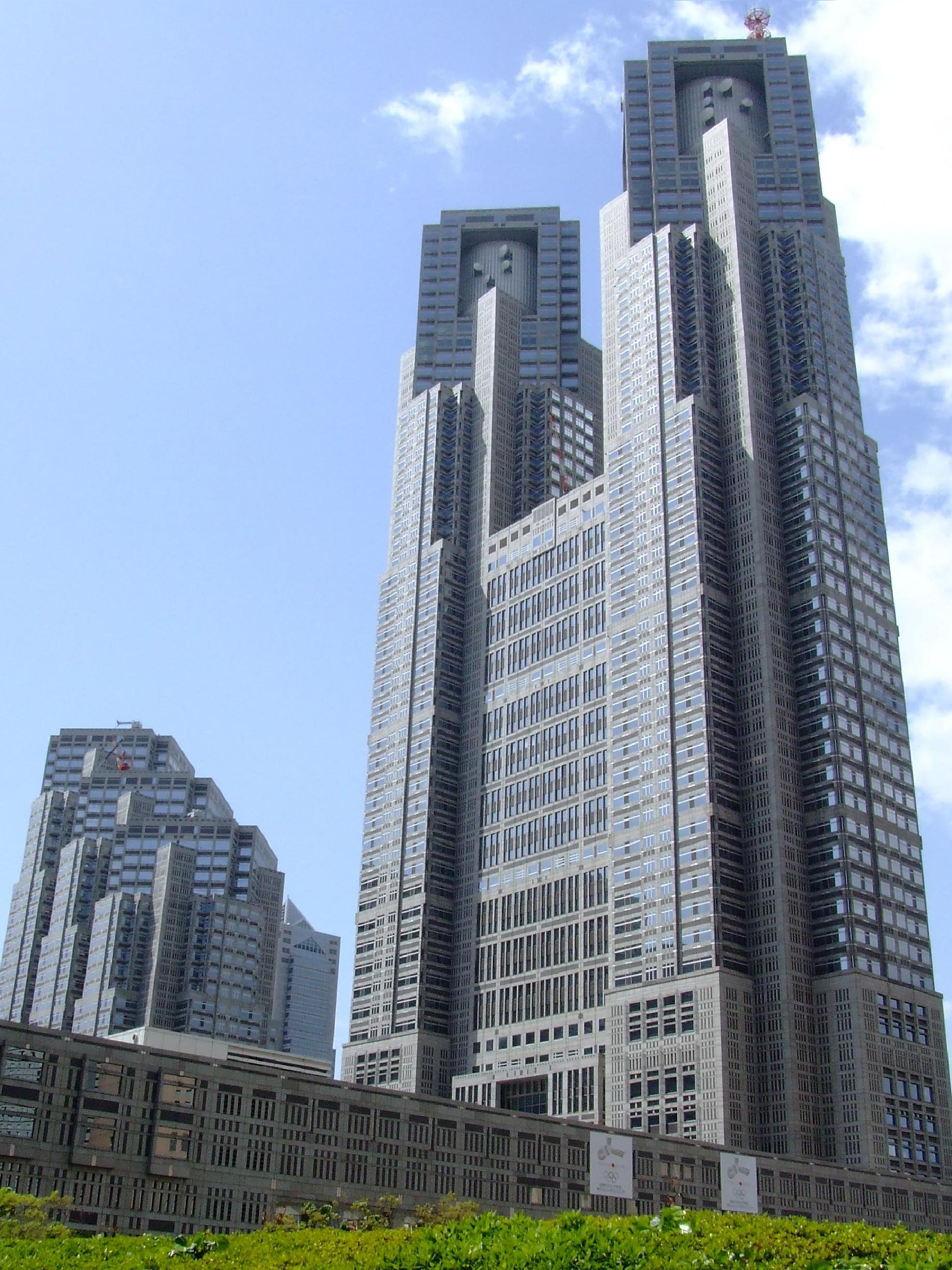
Tokyo Metropolitan Government Building

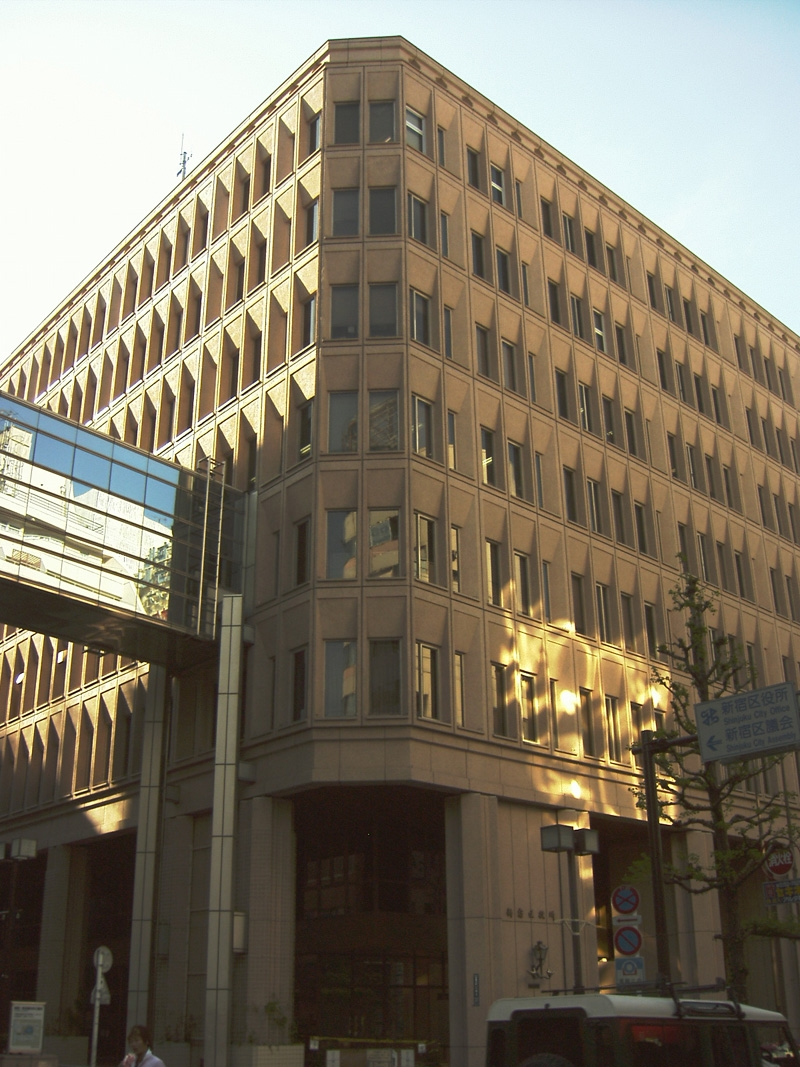
Shinjuku City Office

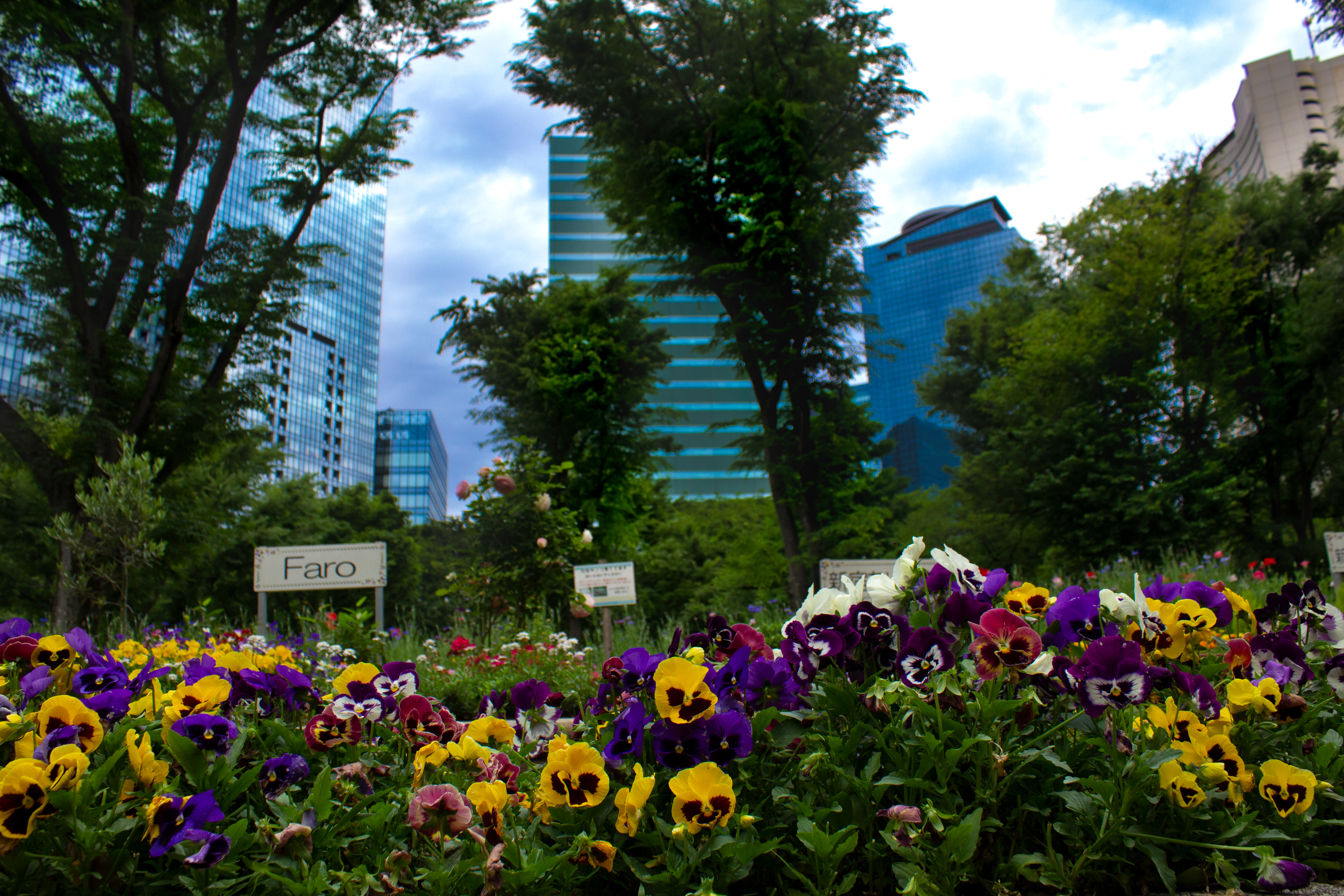
Shinjuku Central Park

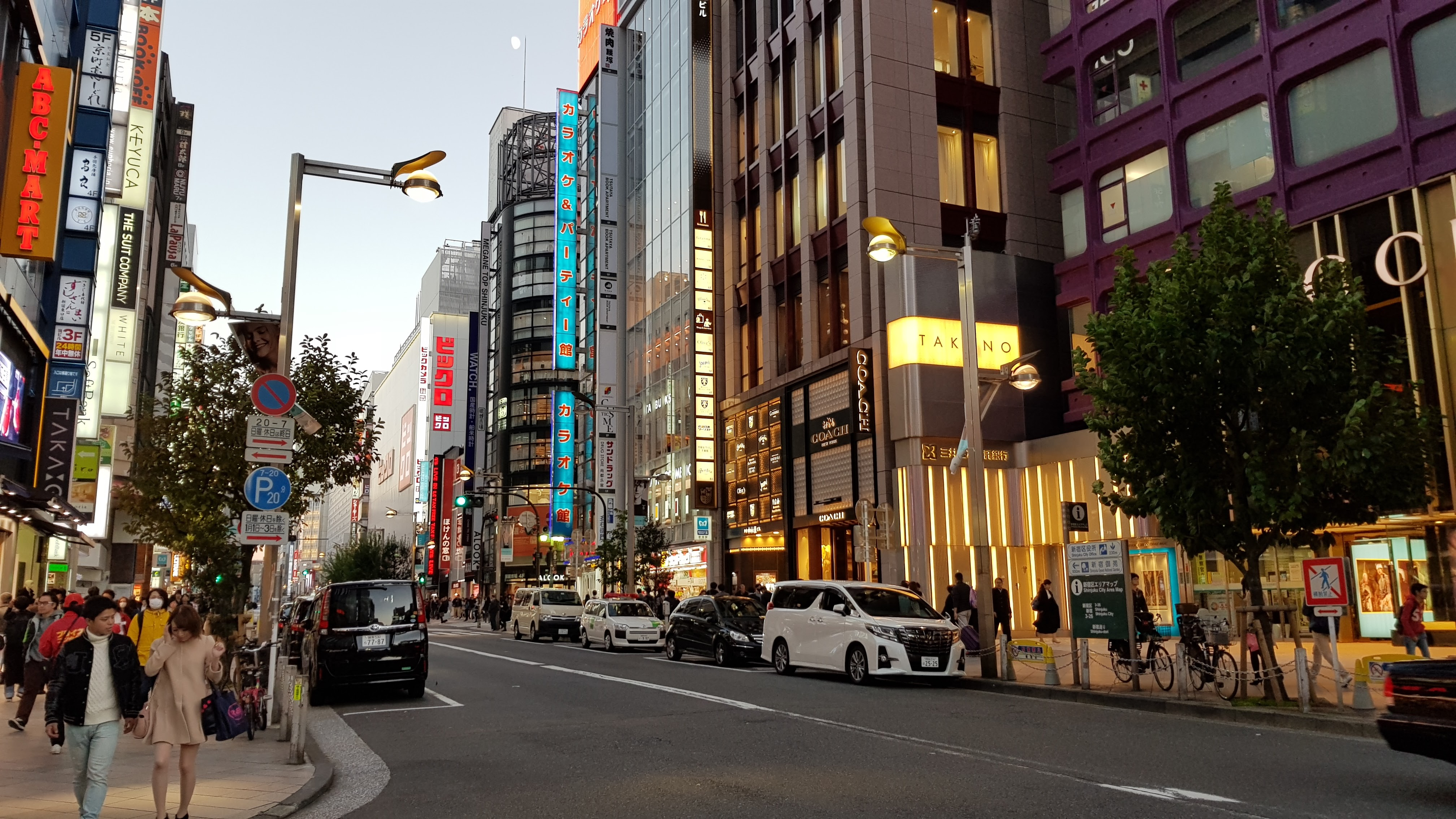
Shinjuku shopping street

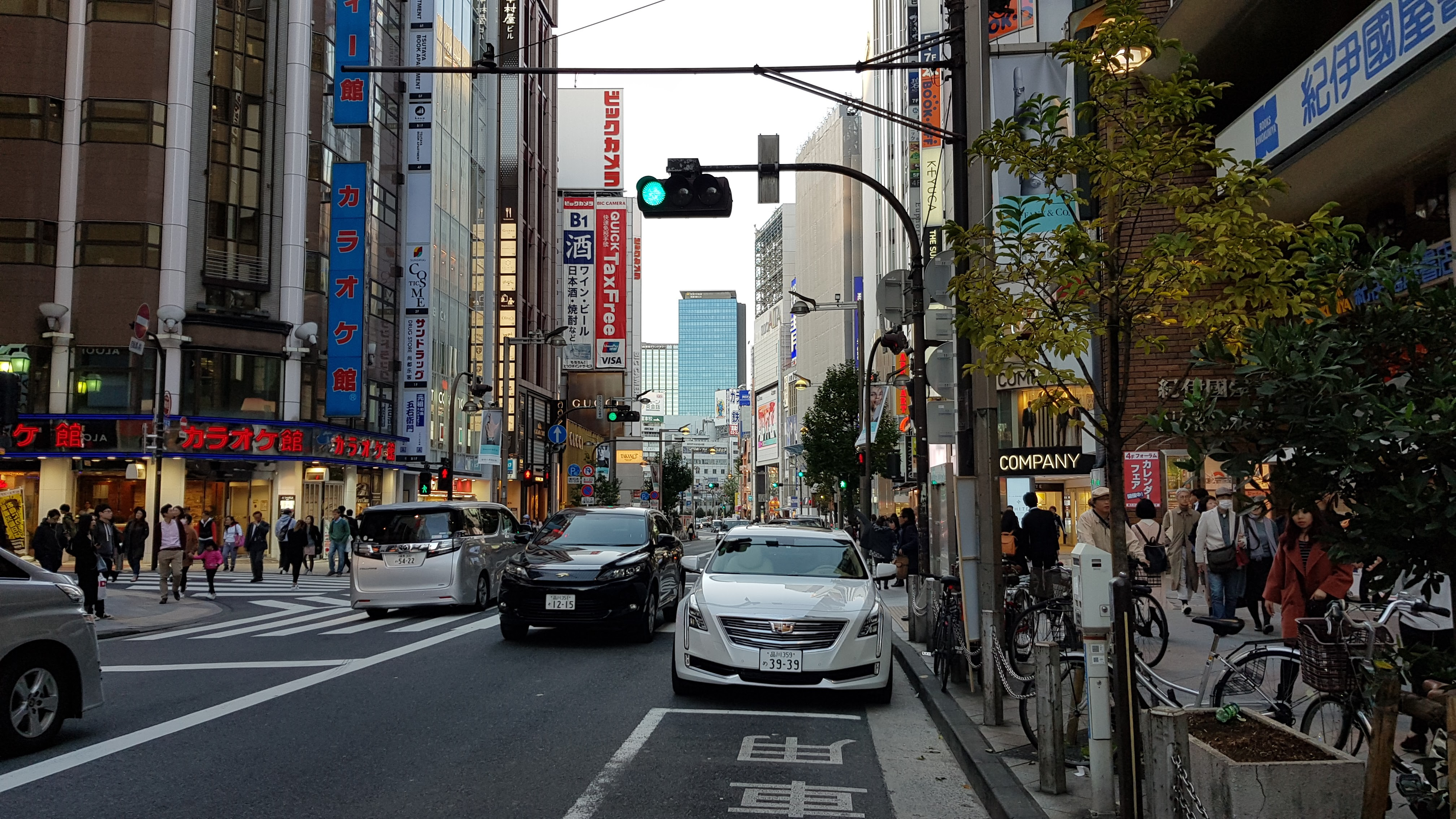
Shinjuku shopping area

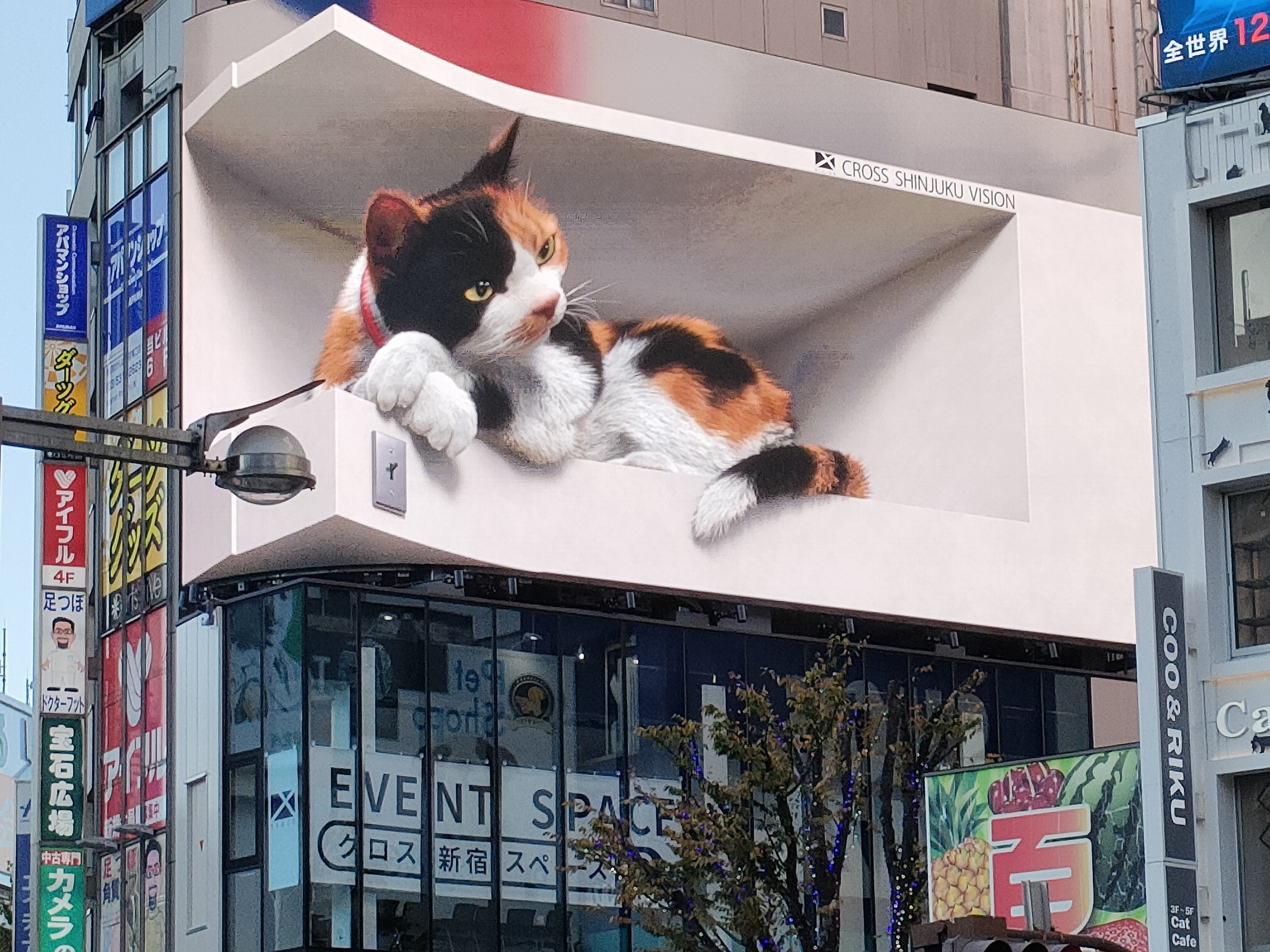
A giant 3D calico cat, known officially as the “Shinjuku Higashi-guchi no Neko” (The Cat of Shinjuku East Exit), projected near the east exit of Shinjuku Station

Like the other special wards of Tokyo, Shinjuku has a status equivalent to that of a city. The current mayor is Kenichi Yoshizumi.

The ward council (区議会, kugikai) consists of 38 elected members; the Liberal Democratic Party and New Komeitō Party together currently hold a majority. The Democratic Party of Japan, Japanese Communist Party and the Social Democratic Party are also represented together with four independents. Shinjuku's city office (区役所, kuyakusho) is located on the southeastern edge of Kabukichō.

Shinjuku is also the location of the Tokyo Metropolitan Government. The governor's office, the metropolitan assembly chamber, and all administrative head offices are located in the Tokyo Metropolitan Government Building.

=== Elections ===
- 2006 Shinjuku mayoral election
- 2007 Shinjuku local election

== Public institutions ==
=== Libraries ===
Shinjuku operates several public libraries, including the Central Library (with the Children's Library), the Yotsuya Library, the Tsurumaki Library, Tsunohazu Library, the Nishi-Ochiai Library, the Toyama Library, the Kita-Shinjuku Library, the Okubo Library, and the Nakamachi Library. In addition there is a branch library, Branch Library of Central Library in the City Office, located in the city office.

=== Hospitals ===
There are several major hospitals located within the city limits:

- Center Hospital of the National Center for Global Health and Medicine
- Keio University Hospital
- National Center for Global Health and Medicine
- Tokyo Yamate Medical Center
- Tokyo Medical University Hospital
- Tokyo Women's Medical University Hospital
- Tokyo Metropolitan Health and Medical Treatment Corporation Ohkubo Hospital

=== Cultural centers ===
==== Museums ====
- National Printing Bureau Banknote and Postage Stamp Museum
- National Museum of Nature and Science, Shinjuku Branch
- Shinjuku Historical Museum
- Tokyo Fire Department Museum
- Tokyo Toy Museum

==== Halls ====
- Tokyo Opera City
- Shinjuku Bunka Center
- Meiji Yasuda Life Hall

== Transportation ==
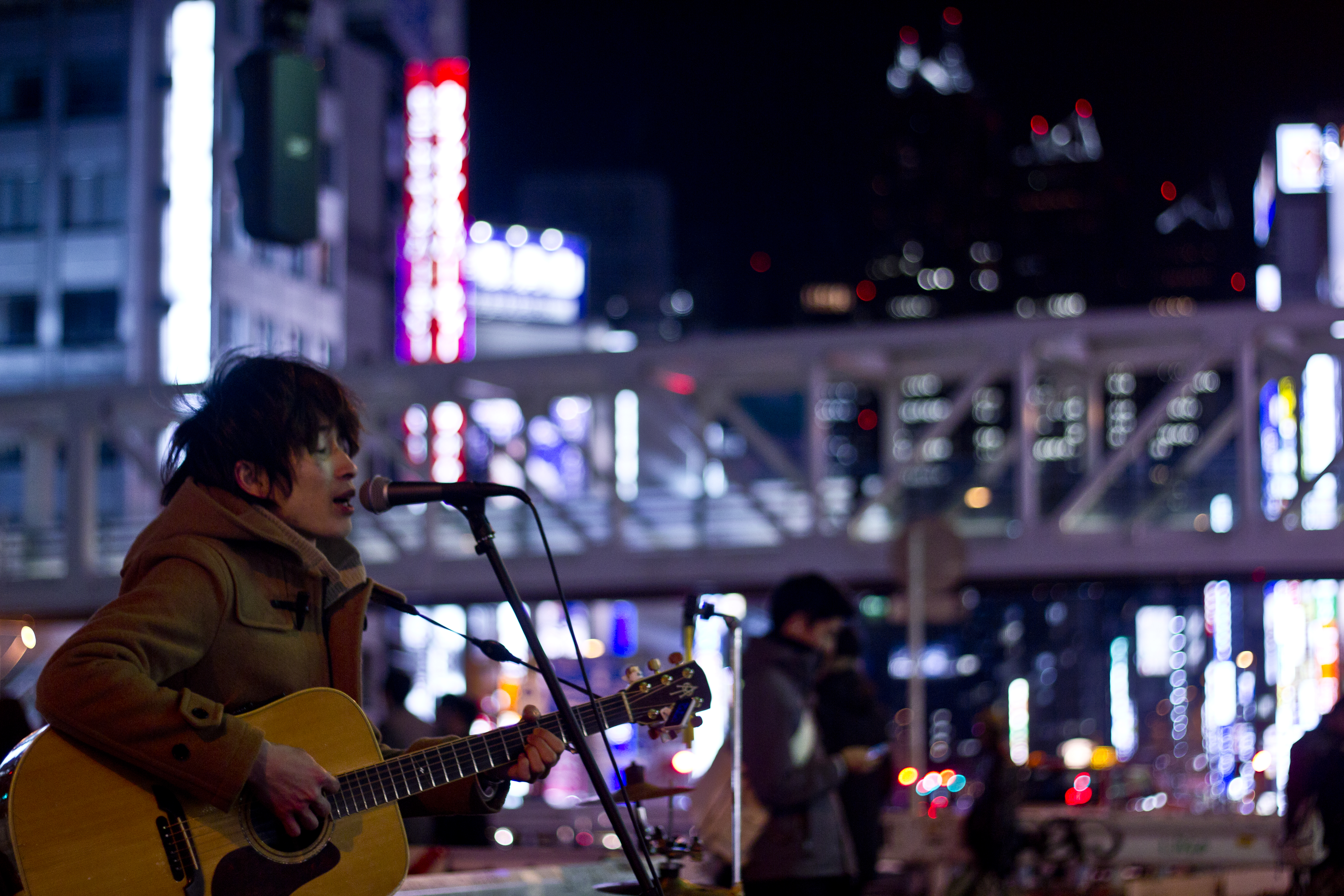
A guitarist immediately south of the Shinjuku JR Station, a popular busking location

Shinjuku is a major urban transit hub. Shinjuku Station sees an estimated 3.64 million passengers pass through each day, making it the busiest station in the world. It houses interchanges to three subway lines and three privately owned commuter lines, as well as several JR lines.

The southern half of this area surrounding the station and majority of the station are in fact located in the neighboring Shibuya ward.

=== Rail ===
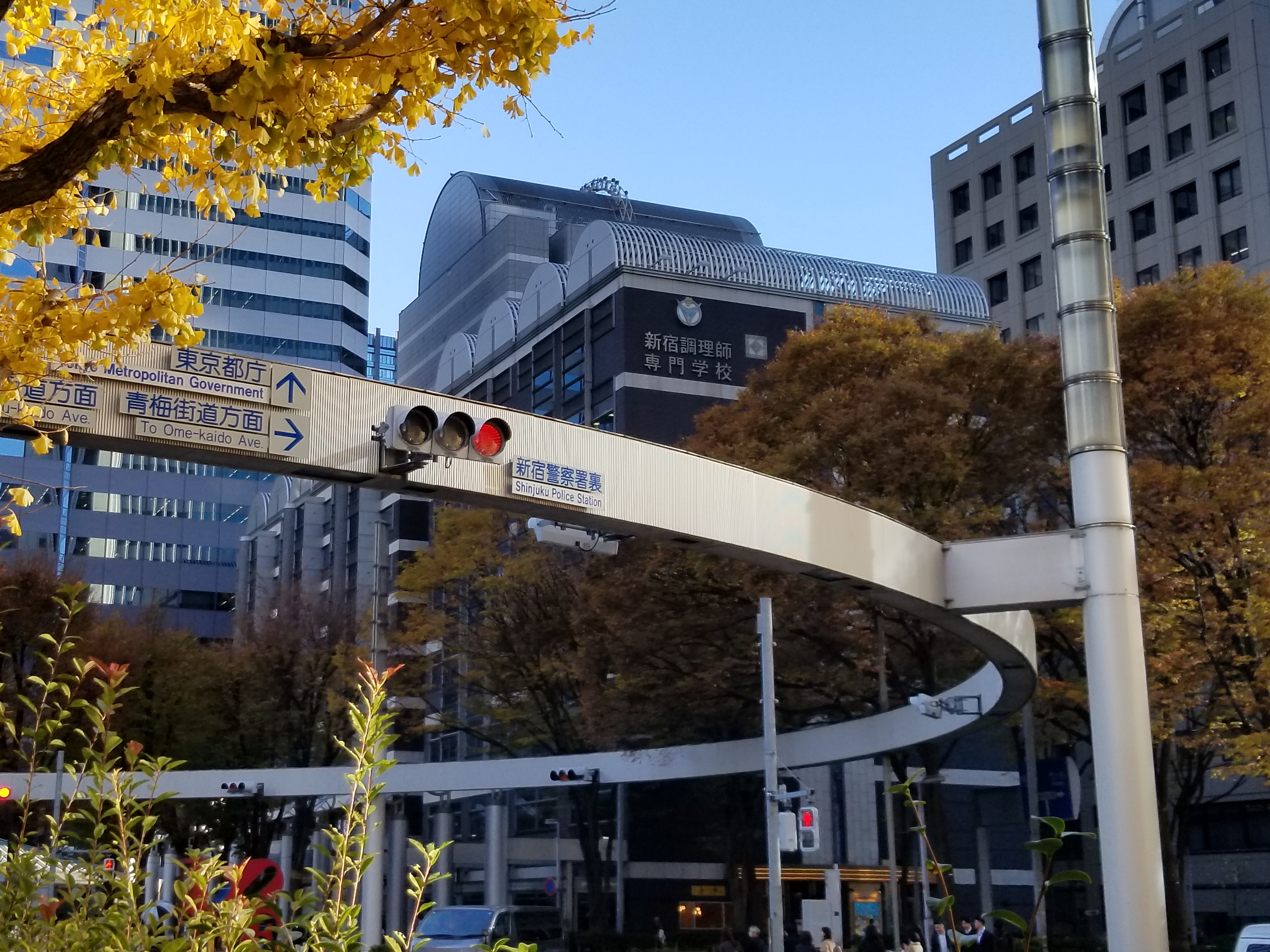
Shinjuku Police Station intersection near Nishi-Shinjuku Station

A list of railway lines passing through and stations located within Shinjuku includes:

- JR East
  - Yamanote Line: Takadanobaba, Shin-Ōkubo, Shinjuku
  - Chūō Line (Rapid), Chūō-Sōbu Line: Yotsuya, Shinanomachi, Shinjuku, Ōkubo
  - Saikyō Line, Shōnan-Shinjuku Line: Shinjuku
- Tokyo Metro
  - Marunouchi Line: Yotsuya, Yotsuya-sanchōme, Shinjuku-gyoenmae, Shinjuku-sanchōme, Shinjuku, Nishi-Shinjuku
  - Yūrakuchō Line: Ichigaya, Iidabashi
  - Tōzai Line: Kagurazaka, Waseda, Takadanobaba, Ochiai
  - Fukutoshin Line: Nishi-Waseda, Higashi-Shinjuku, Shinjuku-sanchōme
  - Namboku Line: Iidabashi, Ichigaya, Yotsuya
- Tokyo Metropolitan Bureau of Transportation
  - Toei Shinjuku Line: Akebonobashi, Shinjuku-sanchōme, Shinjuku
  - Toei Ōedo Line: Ochiai-Minaminagasaki, Nakai, Nishi-Shinjuku-gochōme, Tochō-mae, Kokuritsu-Kyōgijō, Ushigome-Kagurazaka, Ushigome-Yanagichō, Wakamatsu-Kawada, Higashi-Shinjuku, Shinjuku-Nishiguchi
  - Toden Arakawa Line: Omokagebashi, Waseda
- Odakyu Electric Railway Odawara Line: Shinjuku
- Keio Corporation Keio Line, Keio New Line: Shinjuku
- Seibu Railway Seibu Shinjuku Line: Seibu-Shinjuku, Takadanobaba, Shimo-Ochiai, Nakai

=== Roads ===
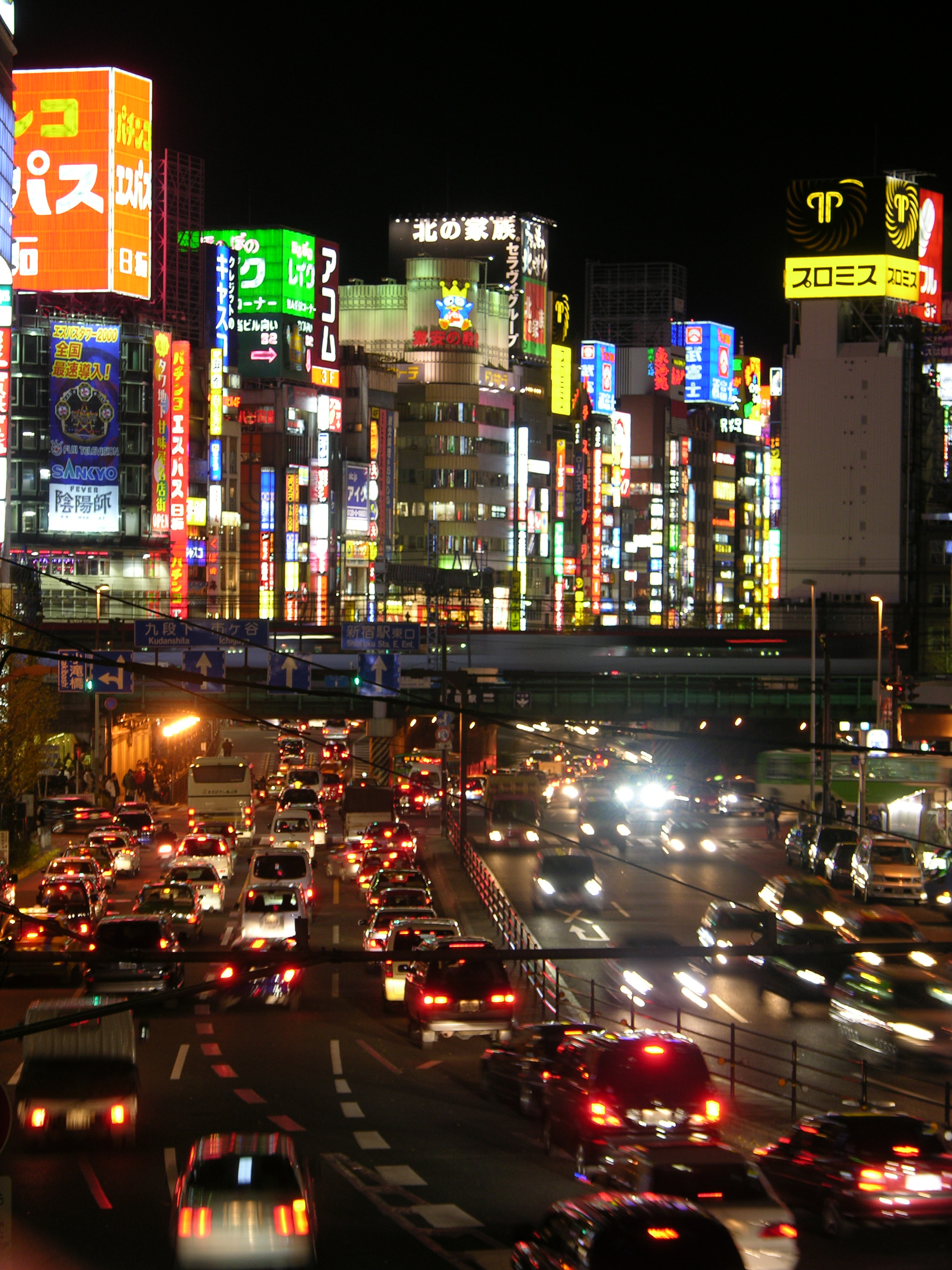
Traffic on Ōme-kaidō heading towards Kabukichō at night, 2005

Shuto Expressway:

- No.4 Shinjuku Route (Miyakezaka JCT - Takaido)
- No.5 Ikebukuro Route (Takebashi JCT - Bijogi JCT)

National highways:

- National Route 20 (Shinjuku-dōri, Kōshū-kaidō)

Other major routes:

- Tokyo Metropolitan Route 8 (Mejiro-dōri, Shin-Mejiro-dōri)
- Tokyo Metropolitan Route 302 (Yasukuni-dōri, Ōme-kaidō)
- Tokyo Metropolitan Route 305 (Meiji-dōri)

== Education ==
=== Colleges and universities ===
- Chuo University graduate school
- Gakushuin Women's College
- Keio University Medical College
- Kogakuin University
- Mejiro University
- Sophia University Mejiro Seibo Campus
- Tokyo Fuji University
- Tokyo Medical University
- Tokyo University of Science
- Tokyo Women's Medical University
- Waseda University

Moved:

- Lakeland University Japan (Sumida-ku)

=== Schools ===
==== High schools ====
Public high schools are operated by the Tokyo Metropolitan Government Board of Education.

- Shinjuku High School
- Shinjuku Yamabuki High School
- Tokyo Metropolitan Toyama High School

Closed:

- Koishikawa Technical High School

Private schools:

- Gakushuin Girls Junior and Senior High School, private girls' school, affiliated with Gakushuin University and Gakushuin Women's College
- Hozen Junior and Senior High School, private boys' school
- Kaijō Junior and Senior High School, private boys' school
- Seijo Senior High School and Seijo Gakuen Junior High School, private girls' school
- Seijō Junior and Senior High School, private boys' school
- Waseda Junior and Senior High School, private boys' school, affiliated with Waseda University
- Meijiro Kenshin Junior and Senior High School

==== Elementary and junior high schools ====
Public elementary and junior high schools in Shinjuku are operated by the Shinjuku City (the Shinjuku Ward) Board of Education (新宿区教育委員会).

== Notable people from Shinjuku-ku ==
- Shinzo Abe, Prime Minister of Japan
- Sugita Genpaku, physician and scholar
- Ichirō Hatoyama, Prime Minister of Japan
- Shinji Higuchi, filmmaker and storyboard artist
- Wakaba Higuchi, figure skater
- Minoru Kiuchi, politician
- Yoshiko Kuga, actress
- Tamiyo Kusakari, actress and ballet dancer
- Yuichiro Nagai, professional footballer
- Sanae Nakahara, actress
- Ken Ogata, actor
- Maya Okamoto, actress, voice actress and singer
- Mineho Ozaki, paralympic athlete
- Kōichi Satō, actor
- Takuma Sato, professional racing driver
- Shunsuke Shima, actor and voice actor
- Kaoru Sugita, actress and singer
- Jun Togawa, singer, musician and actress
- Kōsuke Toyohara, actor and singer
- Kyousei Tsukui, voice actor
- Takashi Ukaji, actor
- Atsuro Watabe, actor
- Koji Yamamoto, actor and singer
- Tatsuhiko Yamamoto, singer-songwriter and composer
- Takeshi Yoshioka, actor
- Kenichi Yoshizumi, politician and mayor of Shinjuku

== Sister cities ==
Shinjuku has sister city agreements with several localities:

- Lefkada, Greece
- Mitte, Berlin, Germany
- Dongcheng District, Beijing, China
- Ina, Nagano, Japan

== See also ==
- Citizens' Plaza, an urban space in Shinjuku
- Tourism in Japan
