= Shinanomachi =

Shinanomachi 信濃町
- District
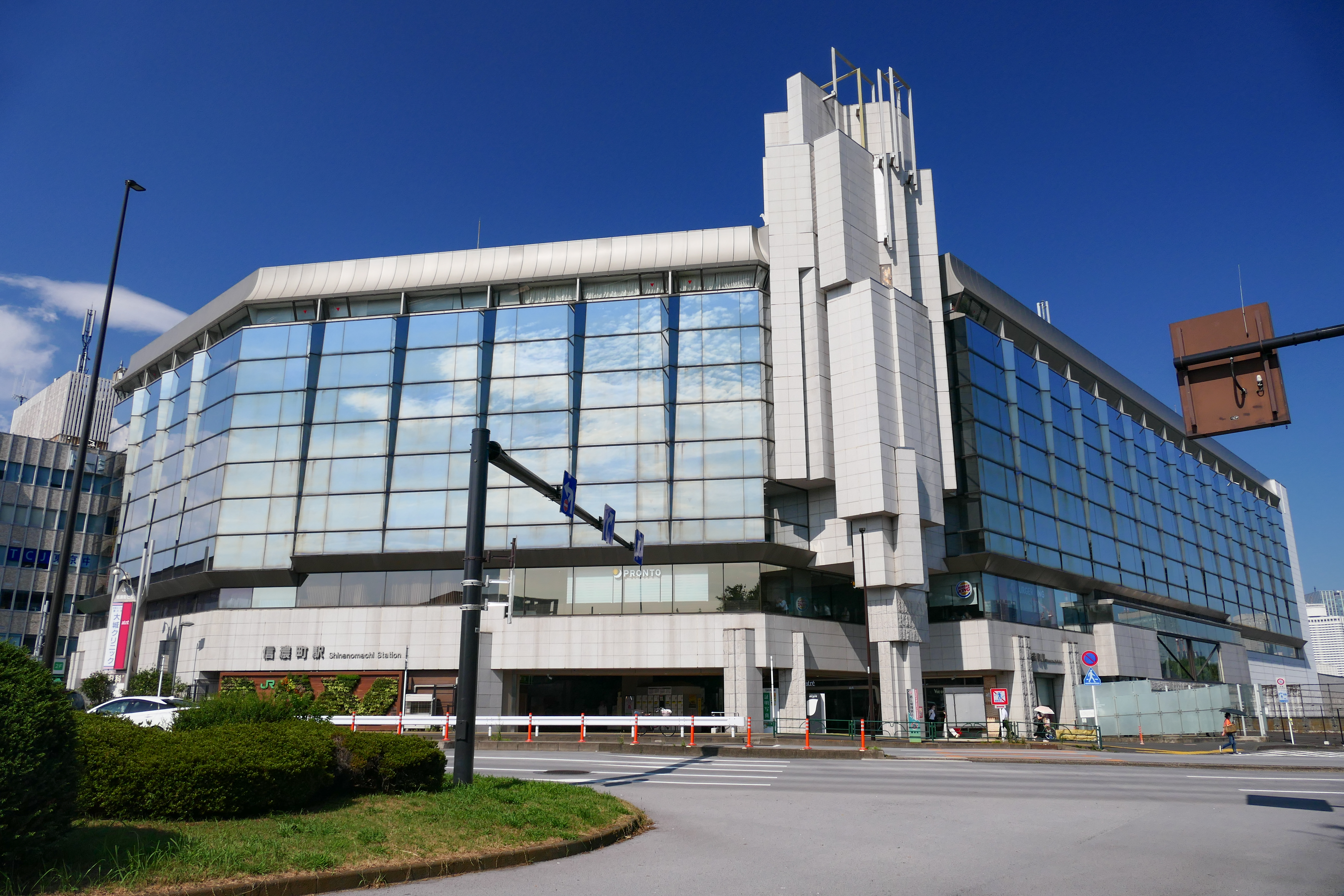
- Shinanomachi Station

- Location of Shinanomachi within Tokyo
- Coordinates: 35°40′49.86″N 139°43′9.69″E
- Country: Japan
- Region: Kantō
- Prefecture: Tokyo
- Ward: Shinjuku

Population (December 1, 2019)
  - Total: 996
- Time zone: UTC+9 (JST)
- Zip code: 160-0016
- Area code: 03

Shinanomachi (信濃町, Shinanomachi; Japanese pronunciation: [ɕì.nä́.nó̞.mä̀.c̟͡ɕì, -mä́.c̟͡ɕí]) is a district of Shinjuku, Tokyo, Japan. It is a single town name that does not have a "chome". Thus, no residential addressing system has been implemented, and the postal code is 160-0016.

== Demographics ==
The number of households and population of each chōme as of December 1, 2019 are as follows:

Chome	Number of households	Population
Shinanomachi	637 households	996 people

== Education ==
The Shinjuku City Board of Education operates public elementary and junior high schools. Shinanomachi is zoned to Yotsuya No. 6 (Dairoku) Elementary School (四谷第六小学校) and Yotsuya Junior High School (四谷中学校).
