= 2003 Shinjuku local election =

Local election in Japan

Shinjuku, Tokyo held an election to the local ward assembly on April 27, 2003, as part of the 15th unified local elections.

== Candidates ==
=== Incumbents ===
- Sanae Abe (阿部 早苗, Abe Sanae), a 49-year-old woman
- Tsuyako Akaba (赤羽 艶子, Akaba Tsuyako), a 47-year-old woman
- Hiroshi Akita (秋田 博, Akita Hiroshi), a 65-year-old man
- Takehiko Amemiya (雨宮 武彦, Amemiya Takehiko), a 55-year-old man
- Teruhisa Asō (麻生 輝久, Asō Teruhisa), a 54-year-old man
- Tamie Azami (あざみ 民栄, Azami Tamie), a 33-year-old woman
- Hidetaka Enoki (榎 秀隆, Enoki Hidetaka), a 38-year-old man
- Isamu Gonnami (権並 勇, Gonnami Isamu), a 69-year-old man
- Masami Inotsume (猪爪 まさみ, Inotsume Masami), a 47-year-old woman and later Tokyo Metropolitan Assemblywoman
- Hideo Kami (上 秀夫, Kami Hideo), a 57-year-old man
- Tsuyako Kasai (笠井 艶子, Kasai Tsuyako), a 55-year-old woman
- Akihiko Kawade (川出 昭彦, Kawade Akihiko), a 37-year-old man
- Tatsuo Kawano (河野 達男, Kawano Tatsuo), a 55-year-old man
- Masako Komatsu (小松 政子, Komatsu Masako), a 51-year-old woman
- Natsuko Kondō (近藤 奈津子, Kondō Natsuko), a 36-year-old woman
- Gōsuke Kubo (久保 合介, Kubo Gōsuke), a 66-year-old man
- Sumiko Kumagai (熊谷 澄子, Kumagai Sumiko), a 57-year-old woman
- Kōhei Kuwabara (桑原 公平, Kuwabara Kōhei), a 50-year-old man
- Masao Matsugaya (松ヶ谷 匡男, Matsugaya Masao), a 64-year-old man and later 2010 candidate for Shinjuku mayor.
- Kimihiro Matsukawa (松川 公浩, Matsukawa Kimihiro), a 41-year-old man
- Toshifumi Miyasaka (宮坂 俊文, Miyasaka Toshifumi), a 48-year-old man
- Yoshihiko Nakamura (中村 吉彦, Nakamura Yoshihiko), a 65-year-old man
- Takeshi Nodzu (野頭 健, Nodzu Takeshi), a 39-year-old man
- Fumiaki Noguchi (野口 史章, Noguchi Fumiaki), a 62-year-old man
- Michio Obata (小畑 通夫, Obata Michio), a 57-year-old man
- Kimiko Ono (小野 紀美子, Ono Kimiko), a 66-year-old woman
- Takeshi Sahara (佐原 勇, Sahara Takeshi), a 59-year-old man
- Ayumi Sawada (沢田 あゆみ, Sawada Ayumi), a 37-year-old woman
- Yūichirō Shida (志田 雄一郎, Shida Yūichirō), a 35-year-old man
- Masaaki Sometani (染谷 正明, Sometani Masaaki), a 59-year-old man
- Yukie Suzuki (鈴木 幸枝, Suzuki Yukie), a 48-year-old woman
- Norihide Tanaka (田中 憲秀, Tanaka Norihide), a 50-year-old man
- Masao Toyoshima (豊嶋 正雄, Toyoshima Masao), a 55-year-old man
- Toshiyuki Yamada (山田 敏行, Yamada Toshiyuki), a 60-year-old man
- Iwao Yamazoe (山添 巌, Yamazoe Iwao), a 59-year-old man

=== Newcomers ===
- Toshirō Arima (有馬 俊郎, Arima Toshirō), a 46-year-old man
- Toshisada Fukazawa (深沢 利定, Fukazawa Toshisada), a 60-year-old man
- Akihiko Henmi (逸見 彰彦, Henmi Akihiko), a 45-year-old man
- Haruji Ishioka (石岡 春二, Ishioka Haruji), a 45-year-old man
- Noriaki Kawamura (川村 範昭, Kawamura Noriaki), a 31-year-old man
- Kōzō Muramatsu (村松 弘三, Muramatsu Kōzō), a 38-year-old man
- Masayuki Nasu (那須 雅之, Nasu Masayuki), a 59-year-old man
- Toshihiko Ogura (小倉 利彦, Ogura Toshihiko), a 42-year-old man
- Shōtarō Ōki (大木 庄太郎, Ōki Shōtarō), a 57-year-old man
- Haruo Shimomura (下村 治生, Shimomura Haruo), a 50-year-old man
- Kazuharu Tsubuki (津吹 一晴, Tsubuki Kazuharu), a 41-year-old man
- Junichi Urushibara (漆原 順一, Urushibara Junichi), a 64-year-old man and previously Shinjuku mayor candidate in 1999 and 2002.
- Haruo Yoshizumi (吉住 栄郎, Yoshizumi Haruo), a 30-year-old man
- Kenichi Yoshizumi (吉住 健一, Yoshizumi Kenichi), a 31-year-old man, later Tokyo Metropolitan Assemblyman and mayor of Shinjuku

Two of the male candidates, 54-year-old male Jirō Nemoto (根本 二郎, Nemoto Jirō) and 39-year-old male Kenji Yamaguchi (山口 健二, Yamaguchi Kenji), were previously in this office.

== Results ==
Summary of the April 27, 2003 Shinjuku Ward Assembly election results
| Parties | Votes | % | Seats |
|---|---|---|---|
| New Komeito party (公明党, Kōmeitō) | | | 9 |
| Japanese Communist Party (日本共産党, Nihon Kyōsan-tō) | | | 9 |
| Liberal Democratic Party of Japan (自由民主党, Jiyū Minshutō) | | | 8 |
| Democratic Party of Japan (民主党, Minshutō) | | | 3 |
| New Socialist Party | | | 1 |
| Independents | | | 8 |
| Total (turnout 40.52%) | 91,293 | 100.00 | 38 |
Source: Official results Archived 2007-04-30 at the Wayback Machine

=== Candidate results ===
2003 Shinjuku local election
| Party | Candidate | Votes | % | ±% |
|---|---|---|---|---|
| Independent | Hidetaka Enoki | 3,327 | | |
| Komeito | Masao Toyoshima | 2,622 | | |
| LDP | Haruo Shimomura | 2,517 | | |
| LDP | Kenichi Yoshizumi | 2,468.65 | | |
| Komeito | Tsuyako Akaba | 2,425 | | |
| JCP | Noriaki Kawamura | 2,411 | | |
| Komeito | Yukie Suzuki | 2,353 | | |
| Komeito | Masako Komatsu | 2,343 | | |
| Komeito | Toshirō Arima | 2,318 | | |
| Komeito | Iwao Yamazoe | 2,306 | | |
| Komeito | Michio Obata | 2,258 | | |
| Komeito | Masaaki Sometani | 2,237 | | |
| Komeito | Sumiko Kumagai | 2,158 | | |
| JCP | Natsuko Kondō | 2,120 | | |
| Democratic | Gōsuke Kubo | 2,113 | | |
| JCP | Ayumi Sawada | 2,112 | | |
| Independent | Masami Inotsume | 2,069 | | |
| Democratic | Yūichirō Shida | 2,061 | | |
| JCP | Sanae Abe | 2,007 | | |
| Independent | Takeshi Nodzu | 1,942.59 | | |
| LDP | Hiroshi Akita | 1,941 | | |
| Social Democratic | Tatsuo Kawano | 1,935 | | |
| New Socialist | Toshiyuki Yamada | 1,866 | | |
| LDP | Kōhei Kuwabara | 1,863 | | |
| JCP | Takehiko Amemiya | 1,812 | | |
| LDP | Fumiaki Noguchi | 1,806 | | |
| Independent | Jirō Nemoto | 1,797 | | |
| LDP | Toshifumi Miyasaka | 1,748 | | |
| JCP | Tamie Azami | 1,723 | | |
| JCP | Norihide Tanaka | 1,688 | | |
| JCP | Masao Matsugaya | 1,586 | | |
| Democratic | Kimiko Ono | 1,582 | | |
| LDP | Toshihiko Ogura | 1,553 | | |
| JCP | Tsuyako Kasai | 1,527 | | |
| Independent | Masayuki Nasu | 1,522 | | |
| LDP | Toshisada Fukazawa | 1,440 | | |
| Independent | Junichi Urushibara | 1,397 | | |
| Independent | Teruhisa Asō | 1,389 | | |
| LDP | Kenji Yamaguchi | 1382 | | |
| LDP | Yoshihiko Nakamura | 1362 | | |
| Independent | Takeshi Sahara | 1337.41 | | |
| LDP | Haruo Yoshizumi | 1250.35 | | |
| Independent | Isamu Gonnami | 1225 | | |
| Independent | Hideo Kami | 1128 | | |
| Independent | Akihiko Kawade | 1060 | | |
| Democratic | Shōtarō Ōki | 1020 | | |
| Independent | Kazuharu Tsubuki | 977 | | |
| Independent | Kimihiro Matsukawa | 736 | | |
| Independent | Haruji Ishioka | 369 | | |
| Independent | Akihiko Henmi | 340 | | |
| LDP | Kōzō Muramatsu | | | |
| Turnout | | | 40.52 | |
