= Kikuichō =

Kikuichō 喜久井町
- District
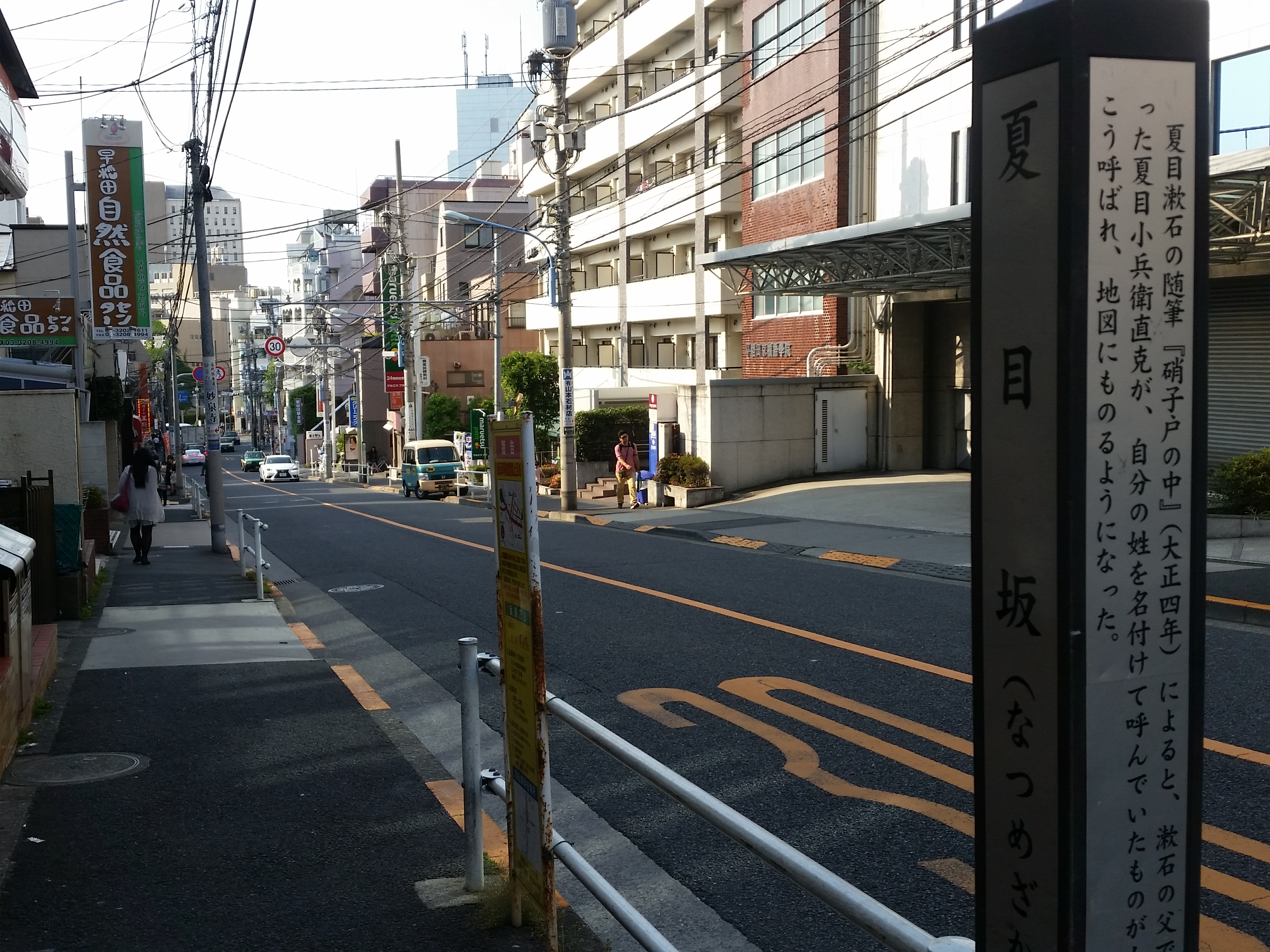
- Looking northwards down Natsumezaka-dōri

- Location within Special wards of Tokyo Location within Tokyo Location within Japan
- Coordinates: 35.70363°N 139.72171°E
- Country: Japan
- Region: Kantō
- Prefecture: Tokyo
- Ward: Shinjuku

Area
  - Total: 10.36371 ha (25.6093 acres)

Population (February 2026)
  - Total: 1,965
  - Density: 18,960/km^{2} (49,100/sq mi)
- Time zone: UTC+9 (Japan Standard Time)
- Postal Code: 162-0044
- Vehicle registration: Nerima

Kikuichō (Japanese: 喜久井町) is a district located in the northern part of Shinjuku, Tokyo, Japan.

== Geography ==
Kikuichō is bordered by eight other districts of Shinjuku: (clockwise, from the north) Babashitachō, Waseda-tsurumakichō, Waseda-minamichō, Bentenchō, Haramachi-itchōme, Haramachi-nichōme, Wakamatsuchō, and Toyama-itchōme. It is primarily a residential area. Shops, restaurants and several temples are located along the main thoroughfare, Natsumezaka-dōri.

The closest train stations are Waseda Station (Tokyo Metro) on the Tokyo Metro Tozai Line and Ushigome-yanagichō Station on the Toei Oedo Line.

== Land Price ==
The average land price in Kikuichō was ¥1,230,000/m^{2} as of September 2023. By comparison, the average price across all of Shinjuku was ¥1,365,000/m^{2} as of March 2024.

== Addresses ==
Addresses in Kikuichō do not implement the modern jūkyo hyōji (住居表示) format, and there is no division into chōme (丁目). Instead, the older chiban (地番) system based on lot numbers remains in use. Due to subdivision, multiple buildings often share the same lot number.

== Demographics ==
Kikuichō contains 1,217 households as of February 2026, consisting of 994 male and 971 female registered residents.

Residents by Age
Age Range	Japanese Citizens	Non Japanese Citizens	All Residents
0–4	39	2	41
5–9	66	0	66
10–14	64	3	67
15–19	66	18	84
20–24	128	34	162
25–29	163	44	207
30–34	116	24	140
35–39	92	6	98
40–44	115	9	124
45–49	142	8	150
50–54	138	5	143
55–59	138	6	144
60–64	114	4	118
65–69	83	0	83
70–74	76	0	76
75–79	83	0	83
80–84	80	2	82
85–89	53	0	53
90–94	27	0	27
95–99	17	0	17
100+	0	0	0
Total	1,800	165	1,965

92% of the population are Japanese nationals and 21% are over 65 years of age.

== Notable Facilities and Places ==
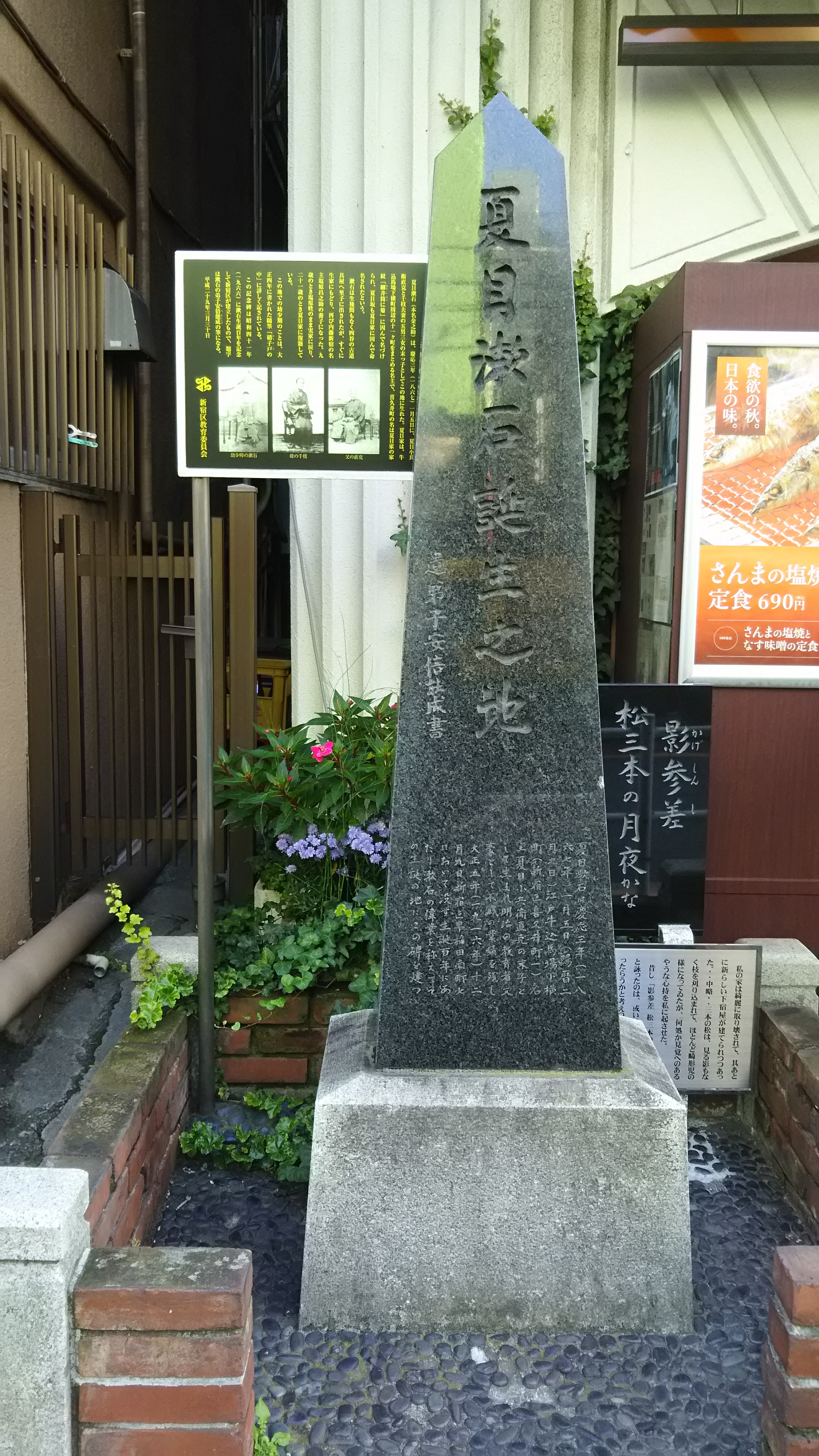
Natsume Sōseki Birthplace Monument

- Ushigome Daini Junior High School (牛込第二中学校)
- Kikuichō Campus, Waseda University (早稲田大学喜久井町キャンパス)
- Kantsuji Temple (感通寺)
- Honshōji Temple (本松寺)
- Myosenji Temple (妙泉寺)
- Raikoji Temple (来迎寺)
- Seikanji Temple (誓閑寺)
- Natsume Sōseki Birthplace Monument (夏目漱石誕生の地碑)
- Kikuichō War Victims Memorial Kannon Statue (喜久井町戦災者供養観音像)

== Education ==
The Shinjuku City Board of Education operates public elementary and junior high schools. Kikuichō is zoned to Shinjuku Waseda Elementary School (早稲田小学校) and Ushigome Daini (No. 2) Junior High School (新宿区立牛込第二中学校).

== History ==
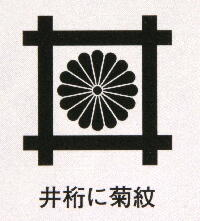
Natsume family crest displaying a chrysanthemum in a well girder

Kikuichō was named by Natsume Naokatsu in April 1869. Natsume Sōseki, his son, wrote about the origin of the name:

今私の住んでゐる近所に喜久井町といふ町がある。これは私の生れた所だから、ほかの人よりもよく知つてゐる。（中略）この町は江戸と云つた昔には、多分存在してゐなかつたものらしい。江戸が東京に改まつた時か、それともずつと後になつてからか、年代はたしかに分らないが、何でも私の父が拵えたものに相違ないのである。私の家の定紋が井桁に菊なので、それにちなんだ菊に井戸を使つて、喜久井町としたといふ話は、父自身の口から聴いたのか、または他のものから教はつたのか、何しろ今でもまだ私の耳に残つてゐる。

Translation: The neighbourhood where I now live is a town called Kikuichō. This is where I was born, so I know it better than anyone else. (Omitted) This town probably didn't exist in the old days of Edo. Whether it was when Edo changed to Tokyo or later I don't know, but it is said that it was named by my father. I remember hearing the story told to me by my father, or perhaps someone else, that since my family crest is a chrysanthemum in a well girder, Kikuichō was named using the words for chrysanthemum and well.

— Natsume Sōseki, Inside My Glass Doors, Chapter 23

Natsume Naokatsu also gave his name to the long slope in the area, Natsumezaka.

Kikuichō was originally a district of Ushigome-ku. It became part of Shinjuku-ku on March 15, 1947 with the merger of the former wards of Yotsuya-ku, Ushigome-ku, and Yodobashi-ku.
