= 2007 Shinjuku local election =

Local election in Japan

Shinjuku, Tokyo held a local election for the city assembly on April 22, 2007 as part of the 2007 Japanese unified local elections.

== Election results ==
Summary of the April 22, 2007 Shinjuku City Assembly election results
Parties	Votes	%	Seats
Liberal Democratic Party (自由民主党, Jiyū Minshutō)	23,018		10
New Komeito Party (公明党, Kōmeitō)	19,806		9
Japanese Communist Party (日本共産党, Nihon Kyōsan-tō)	15,642		8
Democratic Party of Japan (民主党, Minshutō)	10,990		5
New Socialist Party (新社会党, Shin-Shakaitō)	2,358		1
Social Democratic Party (社民党 Shamin-tō)	2,108		1
Independents	8,216		4
Total (turnout 40.15%)	N/A	100.00	38

== See also ==
- 2003 Shinjuku local election
