= Meijiro Kenshin Junior and Senior High School =

Private school in Shinjuku, Tokyo, Japan

Mejiro Kenshin Junior and Senior High School
- 目白研心中学校・高等学校

Location
- 4-31-1 Nakaochiai; Shinjuku, Tokyo, 161-8522; Japan; 35°43′06″N 139°40′51″E

Information
- Type: Private junior and senior high school
- Established: 1923
- Founder: Shigechika Sato and Fuyu Sato
- Principal: Naoko Yoshida
- Gender: Coeducational
- Affiliation: Mejiro Gakuen Educational Foundation
- Website: mk.mejiro.ac.jp

Mejiro Kenshin Junior and Senior High School (目白研心中学校・高等学校, Meijiro Kenshin Chūgakkō Kōtōgakkō) is a private junior and senior high school in Shinjuku, Tokyo.

Kenshin Gakuen (研心学園) was established in 1923 and became Meijiro Gakuen Junior and Senior High School (目白学園中学校・高等学校, Meijiro Gakuen Chūgakkō Kōtōgakkō) in 1948. It adopted its current name and form in 2009.
