= Tokyo Medical University =

Private university in Tokyo, Japan

- 東京医科大学
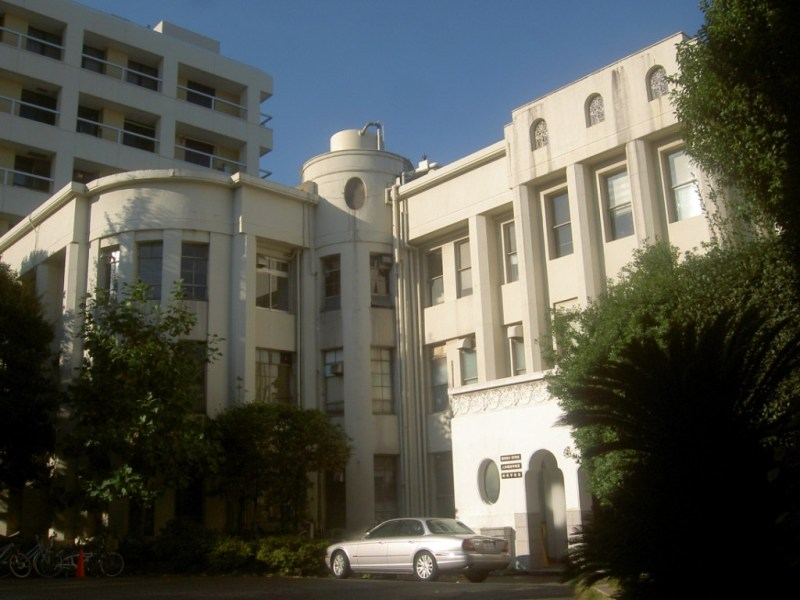
- The headquarters of Tokyo Medical University
- Motto: 自主自学
- Motto in English: "Self-reliance and Self-study"
- Type: Medical University
- Established: May 1, 1916
- Founder: Takuya Takahashi (高橋琢也)
- Endowment: 141,616,375,000 JPY
- Budget: 141,616,375,000 JPY (2023)
- Chairman: Yoshio Yazaki (矢﨑義雄)
- President: Keisuke Miyazawa (宮澤啓介)
- Academic staff: 850
- Total staff: 4,213
- Students: 1525
- Undergraduates: 1031
- Postgraduates: 217
- Other students: 277 (vocational students)
- Location: 東京都新宿区新宿6-1-1, Tokyo, 160-8402, Japan; 35°41′37.1″N 139°42′44.1″E
- Website: www.tokyo-med.ac.jp

Tokyo Medical University (東京医科大学, Tōkyō Ika Daigaku) is a private medical university located in Shibuya, Tokyo, Japan. Established in 1916, it is one of the medical schools established in Japan before World War II.

In accordance with the nation's policy for medical education, this private university has a six-year medical school curriculum that offers 'preclinical' and 'clinical' studies to confer a bachelor's degree or graduate degree with which medical students are qualified for the national medical licensing exam. The university also has a postgraduate school (graduate school or daigakuin in Japanese) that offers Ph.D. degrees.

== History ==
Founded as Tokyo Isen (東京医学専門学校) in 1916, Tokyo Medical University is one of the older medical schools of Japan's Taishō period. It received university status in 1946.

=== Manipulation of test scores ===
In August 2018, Tokyo Medical University came under attack for a policy of deliberately lowering entrance exam scores of female applicants by 10-20% in order to keep the number of female students below 30%. The policy is thought to have been in place since 2010, prior to which almost 40% of female students were admitted. The Yomiuri Shimbun newspaper quoted an unknown source at the university who attempted to explain the rationale for the discrimination, saying "many female students who graduate end up leaving the actual medical practice to give birth and raise children."

The Huffington Post reported that it was common for interviewers to probe female students about their marriage and child-rearing plans at their university entrance interview.

In the wake of the news, high ranking medical professionals including Kyoko Tanebe and Ruriko Tsushima, executive board members at the Japan Joint Association of Medical Professional Women as well as education minister Yoshimasa Hayashi, condemned the university and a practice thought to be prevalent in medical universities across Japan.

The university later admitted that exam scores had been altered, and apologized, saying it would consider admitting students who otherwise would have passed the exams. An internal investigation found the practice had been in place since 2006, that the scores of male applicants had also been marked down on at least four occasions, and that scores of students who had made donations to the school had been increased on 19 occasions.

In January 2019, the education ministry announced that as a consequence of the scandal it would not provide financial subsidies to Tokyo Medical University for the current or subsequent fiscal year.

== University Hospital ==
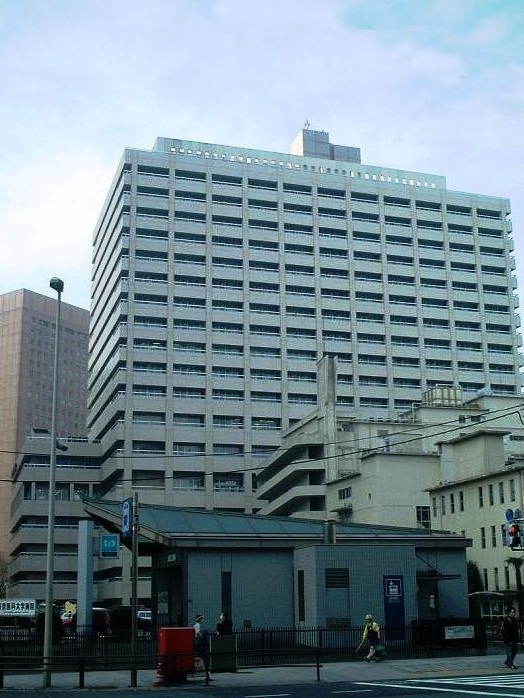
Tokyo Medical University Hospital (2005)

The tertiary care teaching hospitals affiliated with university include Tokyo Medical University Hospital. Founded in 1931, this 1,091-bed hospital, featuring a medical staff of nearly 1,800, is in Nishi Shinjuku, a new center of Tokyo.

Scenes of the 2003 film Lost in Translation were filmed there. This building was replaced by a new one in 2019.

== Collaboration with the World Health Organization ==
The World Health Organization (WHO) and the department of Preventive Medicine and Public Health at Tokyo Medical University collaborate in addressing noncommunicable diseases and mental health issues. The "WHO Collaborating Center for Health Promotion through Research and Training in Sports Medicine," which opened up in 1991, has thus far worked on building health communities and populations.
