= Toei Bus =

Bus service in Tokyo, Japan

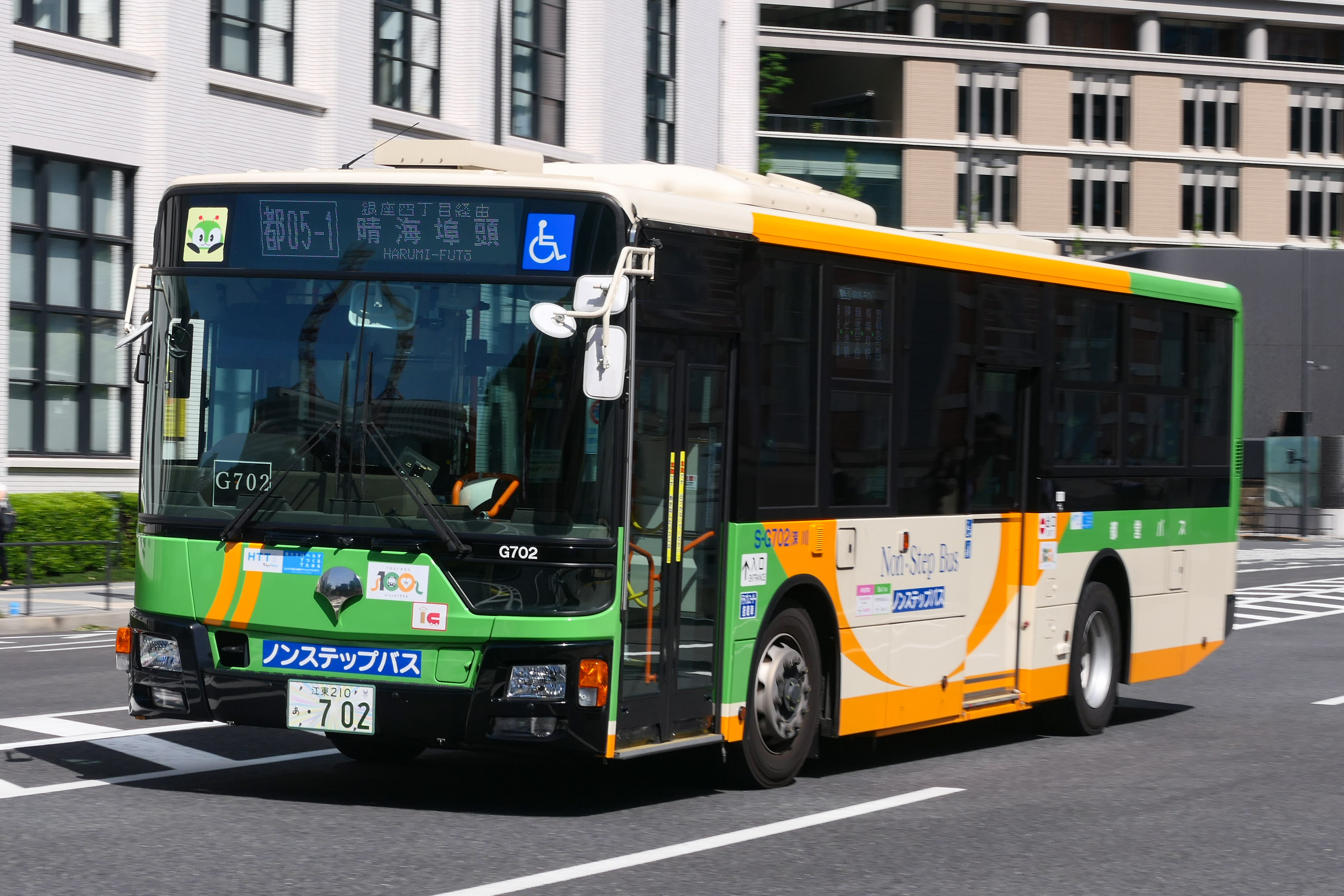
- A Toei Bus Mitsubishi Fuso Aero Star in October 2024
- Founded: 1923 (as Tokyo City Bus)
- Locale: Metropolitan Tokyo region
- Service area: Tokyo, Japan
- Service type: Bus
- Routes: 138
- Stops: 1,639
- Stations: 12 depots, 7 branch offices
- Fleet: 1,467 buses
- Fuel type: Diesel fuel, Hydrogen gas, Electric
- Operator: Tokyo Metropolitan Bureau of Transportation (Tokyo metropolitan government)
- Website: English site

The Toei Bus (都営バス, Toei Basu) is a bus service operated by the Bus Service Division, the Tokyo Metropolitan Bureau of Transportation (東京都交通局, Tōkyō-to Kōtsū-kyoku). It is also called To Bus (都バス, Tobasu).

The bureau mainly operates bus routes in the special wards of Tokyo, as well as those in the city of Ōme in the western Tama Area. It creates a virtual monopoly of bus routes in the central Tokyo (the area roughly within Yamanote Line loop), while those in other parts of Tokyo Metropolis and the Greater Tokyo Area are operated by many different companies. TMBT also operates a few other bus services, such as chartered bus, school bus, and community bus. Tokyo is one of the only two Japanese prefectures that directly operate bus routes, the other being Nagasaki Ken-ei Bus by the Transportation Bureau of Nagasaki Prefecture.

As of February 2022, there are about 200 routes with the total length of 1,103 km (685 mi). If the sections shared by multiple routes are counted once, the length is 779 km (484 mi). 1,467 bus vehicles serve 1,639 bus stops.

Toei Bus has an official mascot called Minkuru (みんくる), a bug-like personification of a bus vehicle.

== History ==
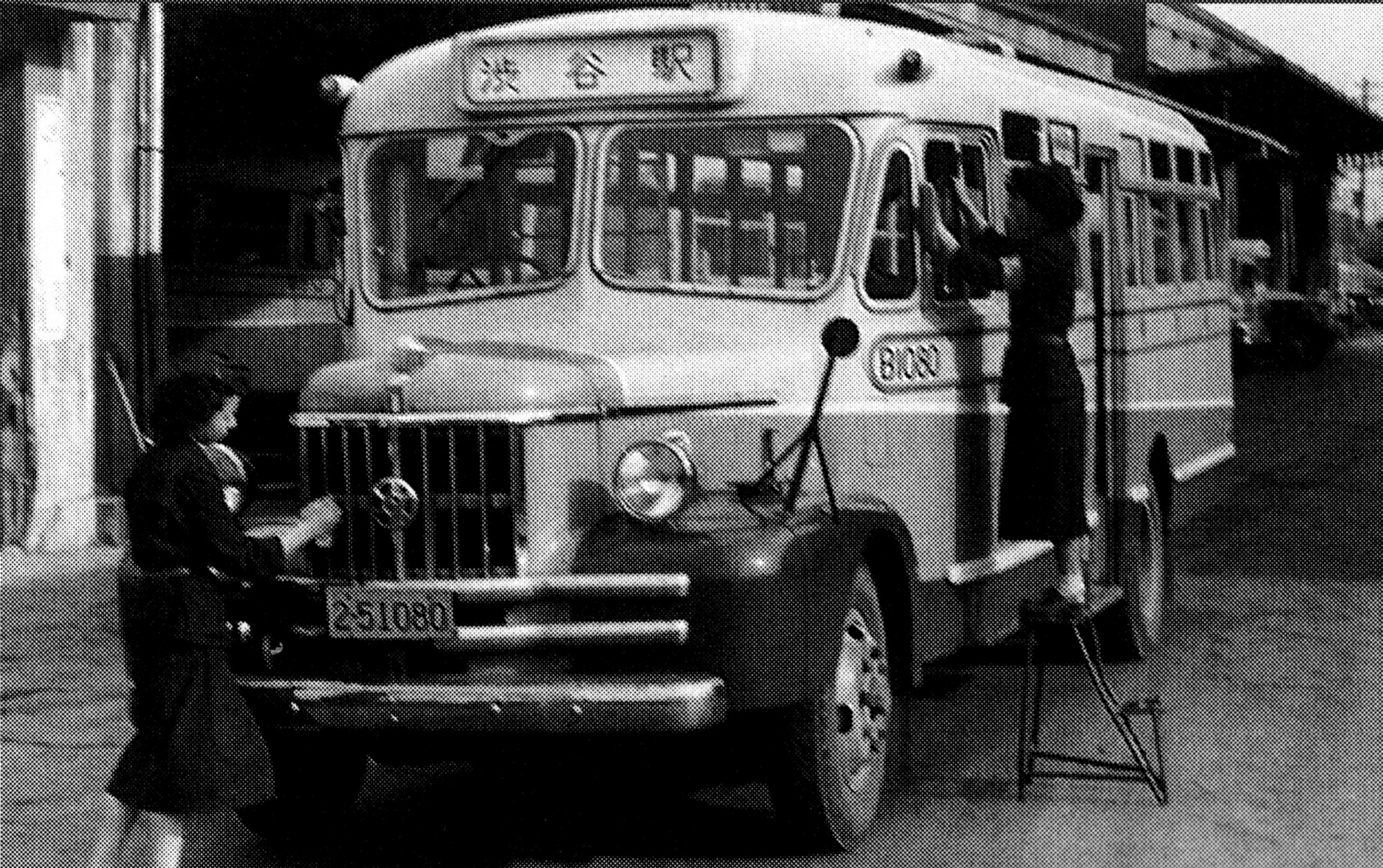
Female bus conductors washing a bus, 1956.

When Tokyo Shiden (Tokyo City Streetcar, the current Tokyo Toden) lines were damaged by the Great Kantō earthquake in 1923, Tokyo City Electricity Bureau started 2 bus routes, originally as an emergency measure. They became the origin of Tokyo City Bus. In 1942, Tokyo City bought over 8 rivaling bus companies, including Tokyo Bus (東京乗合自動車, Tokyo Noriai Jidōsha) of Tokyo Underground Railway (東京地下鉄道), Tokyo Circular Bus (東京環状乗合自動車, Tokyo Kanjō Noriai Jidōsha) of Tokyo Rapid Railway (東京高速鉄道), and others. In 1943, TCEB changed to the Tokyo Metropolitan Bureau of Transportation, as the city changed to the metropolis.

Right after the World War II, there were only 12 routes still in operation. 400 surplus buses from U.S. force were sold to TMBT, helping its recovery. In 1948, its tourist bus division was assigned to Hato Bus (はとバス), which now dominates tourist bus services in Tokyo. Toei Bus had a good financial condition in 1950s, but went into red from 1961. After 1963, many streetcar lines were closed, and new bus routes started their services as substitutes, making the backbone of the current network. In 1975, the bureau succeeded the routes in Ōme from Seibu Bus.

Toei Bus had the highest ridership in 1972 fiscal year, with the average of 1,298,912 daily passengers. With the growth of subway network, the ridership is continuously decreasing. It had the average of 568,863 daily passengers in 2005 fiscal year.

== Bus depots ==
Toei Bus is operated with 12 bus depots and 7 branch offices. Latin letters are assigned to each depot/branch for vehicle identification and such.

- Edogawa Bus Depot (江戸川自動車営業所): V; Nakakasai, Edogawa.
  - Rinkai Branch Office (臨海支所): R; Rinkai, Edogawa.
- Fukagawa Bus Depot (深川自動車営業所): S; Shinonome, Kōtō.
- Kita Bus Depot (北自動車営業所): N; Kamiya, Kita.
  - Nerima Branch Office (練馬支所): F; Toyotamakami, Nerima.
- Kōtō Bus Depot (江東自動車営業所): L; Kōtōbashi, Sumida.
- Minami-Senju Bus Depot (南千住自動車営業所): K; Minamisenju, Arakawa.
  - Aoto Branch Office (青戸支所): Z; Shiratori, Katsushika.
  - Aoto Garage (青戸分駐所): K; Shiratori, Katsushika.
- Otakibashi Bus Depot (小滝橋自動車営業所): E; Higashinakano, Nakano.
- Ōtsuka Bus Depot (大塚自動車営業所): G; Ōtsuka, Bunkyō.
- Senju Bus Depot (千住自動車営業所): H; Umeda, Adachi.
- Shibuya Bus Depot (渋谷自動車営業所): B; Higashi, Shibuya
  - Shinjuku Branch Office (新宿分駐所): B; Nishishinjuku, Shinjuku.
- Shinagawa Bus Depot (品川自動車営業所): A; Kitashinagawa, Shinagawa.
  - Kōnan Branch Office (港南支所): Y; Kōnan, Minato.
- Sugamo Bus Depot (巣鴨自動車営業所): P; Sugamo, Toshima.
- Waseda Bus Depot (早稲田自動車営業所): T; Nishiwaseda, Shinjuku.
  - Ōme Branch Office (青梅支所): W; Morishitachō, Ōme.
  - Suginami Branch Office (杉並支所): D; Umesato, Suginami.

== List of regular routes ==
Most routes are designated by one or two kanji followed by a two-digit number. Some routes have Latin alphabets instead of kanji. A number may be followed by a celestial stem (kō, otsu, etc., equivalent to abc or 123). The term orikaeshi is equivalent to the European bis. "Readings" provided here are tentative. There are no widely accepted English names of the routes. TMBT uses the kanji names even in English texts, like "有30 starts from Kameari-eki Kitaguchi".

All routes are equipped with accessibility feature, such as non-step buses with kneeling function.

Depot	Reading	Name	From	Via	To
Aoto Rinkai	Hira 28	平28	Higashi-Ōjima Sta.	Hirai Sta. (loop route in Hirai Sta.)	Higashi-Ōjima Sta.
Aoto	Kusa 39	草39	Kanamachi Sta.	Asakusa-Kaminarimon (Asakusa-Kaminarimon Gate)	Asakusa-Kotobukichō Ueno-Matsuzakaya (Ueno-Matsuzakaya Department Store)
Aoto	Ue 23	上23	Hirai Sta.	Jukkembashi	Ueno-Matsuzakaya
Aoto	Ue 23 Shutsunyū	上23出入	Aoto-Shako	Yotsugibashi	Hirai Sta.
Aoto	Ue 26	上26	Kameido Sta.	Nishi-Asakusa-Sanchōme (Nishi-Asakusa 3)	Ueno-Kōen (Ueno Park)
Aoto	Nishiki 37	錦37	Aoto-Shako	Nakaibori	Kinshichō Sta.
Ariake	Nami 01 (NM01)	波01 (NM01)	Tokyo Teleport Sta.	Telecom Center Sta.	Chūō-Bōhatei
Kōnan Rinkai	To 04	都04	Toyomi Suisan Futō	Ginza-Yonchōme (Ginza 4)	Tōkyō Sta. Marunouchi Minamiguchi
Ariake	Umi 01 (KM01)	海01 (KM01)	Monzen Nakachō	Toyosu Sta.	Ariake-Itchōme (Ariake 1) Tokyo Teleport Sta.
Kōtō	Kame 23	亀23	Kameido Sta.	Kōtō-Kōreisha-Iryō Center (Juntendo Tokyo Koto Geriatric Medical Center) (Circular)	Kameido Sta.
Edogawa	Kame 24	亀24	Kasaibashi	Ōjima Sta.	Kameido Sta.
Edogawa	Kame 29	亀29	Nagisa New Town	Nishi-Kasai Sta.	Kameido Sta.
Edogawa	Kasai 21	葛西21	Kasai Sta.	Higashi-Kasai-Kyūchōme	Kōsha Heim Minami-Kasai
Edogawa	Kasai 21	葛西21	Kasai Sta.	Higashi-Kasai-Kyūchōme	Kasai-Rinkai-Kōen Sta.
Edogawa	Nishikatsu 20 Otsu	西葛20乙	Nishi-Kasai Sta.	Naka-Kasai-Nanachōme (Naka-Kasai 7)	Kasai-Rinkai-Kōen Sta.
Edogawa	Nishikatsu 20 Kō	西葛20甲	Nishi-Kasai Sta.	Naka-Kasai-Nanachōme (Naka-Kasai 7)	Nagisa New Town
Edogawa	Nishikatsu 27	西葛27	Nishi-Kasai Sta.	Seishin-Futaba-Shōgakkō	Rinkaichō-Nichōme-Danchi
Edogawa	Nishiki 25	錦25	Kasai Sta.	Funabori Sta.	Kinshichō Sta.
Edogawa	Nishiki 25 Shutsunyū	錦25出入	Kasai Sta.	Nagashimachō-Kōsaten	Edogawa-Shako
Edogawa	Nishiki 27	錦27	Koiwa Sta.	Kinshichō Sta.	Ryōgoku Sta.
Edogawa	Nishiki 27-2	錦27-2	Koiwa Sta.	Keiyō-Kōsaten	Funabori Sta.
Kōtō	Nishiki 28	錦28	Higashi Ōjima Sta.	Nishi-Ōjima Sta.	Kinshichō Sta.
Edogawa	Rinkai 28-1	臨海28-1	Ichinoebashi-Nishizume	Kasai Sta.	Kasai-Rinkai-Kōen Sta.
Edogawa	Shinko 21	新小21	Nishi-Kasai Sta.	Funabori Sta.	Shin-Koiwa Sta.
Edogawa	Shinko 22	新小22	Kasai Sta.	Ichinoe Sta.	Shin-Koiwa Sta.
Fukagawa	Higashi 15	東15	Fukagawa Shako	Shinonome-Miyakobashi	Tōkyō-eki Yaesu-Guchi
Fukagawa	Higashi 16	東16	Tokyo Sta. Yaesuguchi (Yaesu Exit)	Tsukishima Sta.	Fukagawa-Shako Tokyo Big Sight
Fukagawa	Ki 11 Kō	木11甲	Kiba Sta. Tōyōchō Sta.	Shin Kiba Ekimae	Tōyōchō Sta.Wakasu Camp Jō
Fukagawa	Kōtō 01	江東01	Shiomi Sta.	Kiba-Nichōme (Kiba 2) Tatsumi Sta. (joint forces with KOTO-KU Community bus "SHIOKAZE")	Shiomi Sta.
Fukagawa	Mon 19	門19	Tokyo Big SightFukagawa-Shako	Toyosu Sta.	Monzen Nakachō
Fukagawa	Nari 10	業10	Shimbashi	Ginza Yon-chōme, Kachidoki Sta.	Toyosu Sta.Kiba Sta.Kikukawa Sta.Tokyo Skytree Sta.
Fukagawa	Nari 10 Shutsunyū	業10出入	ShimbashiTokyo Skytree Sta.	Toyosu Sta.	Fukagawa-Shako
Fukagawa	Nishiki 13 Kō	錦13甲	Kinshichō Sta.	Tōyō San-chōme, Toyosu Sta.	Harumi Futō
Fukagawa	Nishiki 13 Otsu	錦13乙	Kinshichō Sta.	Tōyō San-chōme, Tatsumi Sta.	Fukagawa Shako-mae
Fukagawa	Nishiki 13 Shutsunyū	錦13出入	Toyosu Sta.	Shinonome-Miyakobashi	Fukagawa Shako
Kōtō	Nishiki 18	錦18	Kinshichō Sta.	Sakaigawa only weekday	Shin-Kiba Sta., Kokusai-Tenjijō Sta.
Fukagawa	To 05-1	都05-1	Harumi Futō	Ginza Yon-chōme	Tōkyō Sta. Marunouchi Minamiguchi
Fukagawa	To 05-1 Shutsunyū	都05-1出入	Fukagawa-Shako	Harumi-Sanchōme (Harumi 3)	(Harumi 3) Harumi-Futō
Fukagawa	To 05-2	都05-2	Tokyo Big Sight Ariake-Itchōme (Ariake 1)	Ginza Yon-chōme	Tōkyō Sta. Marunouchi Minamiguchi
Fukagawa	Toyosu 01	豊洲01	Toyosu Sta.	IHI Canal Court (Loop, only the morning and evening of a weekday)	Toyosu Sta.
Ariake	Yō 12-1	陽12-1	Tōyōchō Sta.	Edagawa-Nichōme (Edagawa 2)	Shōwa-Daigaku-Kōtō-Toyosu-Byōin (Showa Univ. Koto Toyosu Hp.)
Ariake	Yō 12-2	陽12-2	Tōyōchō Sta.	Toyosu Sta.	Toyosu-Shijō
Kita	Higashi 43	東43	Kōhoku Sta.Arakawa Dote Sōshajo-mae	Odai	Komagome-Byōin (Komagome Hp.) Tokyo Sta. Marunouchi-Kitaguchi (Marunouchi North Exit)
Kita	Ō 40 Shutsunyū	王40出入	Kita-Shako	Kitaku-Kamiyachō	Ōji Sta.
Kita	Ō 40 Hei	王40丙	Ōji Sta.	Kōnan-Chūgakkō (Loop in Miyagi)	Ōji Ekimae
Kita	Ō 40 Kō	王40甲	Ikebukuro Sta. Higashiguchi	Ōji Sta.	Nishiarai Sta.
Kita	Ō 41	王41	Ōji Sta.	Ōji Go-chōme	Shinden Itchōme
Kita	Ō 45	王45	Ōji Sta.	Shindembashi	Kita Senju Sta.
Kita	Ō 55	王55	Ikebukuro Sta. Ikebukuro Sta. Higashiguchi (East Exit)	Ōji Sta. Heart Island Higashi	Shinden-Itchōme (Shinden 1)
Kita	Ō 57	王57	Akabane Sta. Higashiguchi	Ōji Sta.	Toshima Go-chōme Danchi
Shinagawa	Hama 95	浜95	Shinagawa Sta. Kōnanguchi (Kōnan Exit)	Tamachi Sta. Higashiguchi (East Exit)	Tōkyō Tower
Shinagawa	Hashi 86	橋86	Meguro Ekimae	Aiiku Clinic	Shimbashi Sta.
Kōnan	I 96	井96	Ōimachi Sta. Higashiguchi (East Exit)	Tennōzu Isle, Minami Banba (Loop)	Ōimachi Sta. Higashiguchi (East Exit)
Kōnan	I 98	井98	Ōimachi Sta. Higashiguchi (East Exit)	Tōkyō zeikan-Ōi-Shutchōjo (Tokyo Customs Ōi Branch)	Ōi-Suisambutsu-Futō
Ariake	Kyūkō 06	急行06	Morishita Ekimae	Palette Town (Rapid, only on Saturdays / holidays)	Nippon-Kagaku-Miraikan (NATIONAL MUSEUM OF EMERGING SCIENCE AND INNOVATION)
Shinagawa	Ta 92	田92	Shinagawa Sta. Higashiguchi	Takahamabashi	Tamachi Sta. Higashiguchi
Kōnan	Ta 99	田99	Shinagawa Sta. Kōnanguchi (Kōnan Exit)	Shibaura Futō	Tamachi-eki Higashiguchi
Kōnan	Tan 94	反94	Gotanda Sta.	Takanawadai Sta.	Akabanebashi Sta.
Kōnan	To 03	都03	Harumi Futō	Ginza Yon-chōme	Yotsuya-eki
Kōtō	Chokkō 03	直行03	Kinshichō Sta.	Rapid route only on Saturdays / holidays)	Nippon-Kagaku-Miraikan (NATIONAL MUSEUM OF EMERGING SCIENCE AND INNOVATION)
Kōtō	Higashi 22	東22	Kinshichō Sta.	Tōyōchō Sta.	Tōkyō Sta. Marunouchi Kitaguchi
Ariake	Kame 21	亀21	Tōyōchō Sta.	Kitasuna-Nanachōme (Kitasuna 7)	Kameido Sta.
Kōtō	Kyūkō 05	急行05	Kinshichō Ekimae	Shin Kiba Ekimae (Rapid, only on Saturdays / holidays)	Nippon-Kagaku-Miraikan (NATIONAL MUSEUM OF EMERGING SCIENCE AND INNOVATION)
Kōtō	Mon 33	門33	Kameido Sta.	Kiyosumi-Shirakawa Sta.	Toyomi-Suisan-Futō
Kōtō	Nishiki 18	錦18	Kinshichō Ekimae	Sakaigawa (only weekday)	Shin-Kiba Sta., Kokusai-Tenjijō Sta.
Kōtō	To 07	都07	Kinshichō Sta.	Sakaigawa	Monzen Nakachō
Kōtō	Yō 20	陽20	Tōyōchō Sta.	Kōtō-Kōreisha-Iryō Center (Juntendo Tokyo Koto Geriatric Medical Center)	Higashi-Ōjima Sta.
Minami-Senju	Higashi 42-1	東42-1	Minami-Senju Sta.Nishiguchi (West Exit) Minami-Senju-Shako	Asakusabashi	Tokyo Sta. Yaesuguchi(Yaesu Exit)
Minami-Senju	Higashi 42-2	東42-2	Minami-Senju Sta.Nishiguchi (West Exit) Minami-Senju-Shako	Asakusabashi	Higashi-Kanda
Minami-Senju	Higashi 42-3	東42-3	Minami-Senju-Shako	Riverside Sports Center	Asakusa-Kaminarimon (Asakusa-Kaminarimon Gate)
Minami-Senju	Nishiki 40	錦40	Minami-Senju Sta. Higashiguchi (East Exit)	Tokyo Skytree Sta.	Kinshichō Sta.
Minami-Senju	Sato 22	里22	Nippori Sta.	Ōzeki-Yokochō	Kameido Sta.
Minami-Senju	To 08 (T08)	都08	Nippori Sta.	Senzoku Oshiage	Kinshichō Ekimae
Minami-Senju	Ue 46	上46	Minami-Senju Sta. Higashiguchi (East Exit)	Asakusa-Kotobukichō	Ueno-Matsuzakaya (Ueno-Matsuzakaya Department Store)
Minami-Senju	Ue 46	上46	Minami-Senju-Shako	Asakusa-Kotobukichō	Ueno-Matsuzakaya (Ueno-Matsuzakaya Department Store)
Nerima	Gaku 05	学05	Mejiro Sta.	Nihon Joshidai	Mejiro Sta.
Nerima	Neri 68	練68	Nerima-Shako	Nerima-Sōgō-Byōin-Iriguchi (Nerima-Sōgō Hp.)	Mejiro Sta.
Nerima	Ike 65	池65	Nerima Sta.	Egota-Nichōme (Egota 2)	Ikebukuro Sta. Higashiguchi (East Exit)
Nerima	Shiro 61	白61	Nerima Sta.Nerima-Shako	Hotel Chinzansō Tokyo	Shinjuku Sta. Nishiguchi (West Exit)
Shinjuku	CH01	CH01	Shinjuku Sta. Nishiguchi (West Exit)	Tochō-Daiichi-Honchōsha (Tokyo Metropolitan Government No.1 Building) (Circular) Weekdays only	Shinjuku Sta. Nishiguchi (West Exit)
Otakibashi	Gaku 02	学02	Takadanobaba Sta.	Takadanobaba-Nichōme (Takadanobaba 2)	Sōdai-Seimon (Waseda University)
Otakibashi	Hashi 63	橋63	Otakibashi-Shako	Ichigaya Sta.	Shimbashi Sta.
Otakibashi	Ii 62	飯62	Otakibashi Shako	Ōkubo-Dōri	Toei-Iidabashi Sta.
Otakibashi	Ii 64	飯64	Otakibashi-Shako	Kudanshita	Otakibashi-Shako
Sugamo	To 02 Otsu	都02乙	Ikebukuro Sta. Higashiguchi (East Exit)	Kasuga Sta.	Tokyo Dome CityHitotsubashi (HITOTSUBASHI line operates only in the morning of weekday and Sat.)
Otakibashi	Ue 69	上69	Otakibashi-Shako	Ueno-Kōen (Ueno Park)	Otakibashi-Shako
Ōme	Ume 01	梅01	Ōme Sta.	Gyokudō Bijutsukan (Loop, only on Saturdays / holidays)	Ōme Sta.
Ōme	Ume 70	梅70	Ōme Shako	Hakonegasaki Sta. Higashi-Yamatoshi Sta.	Hana-Koganei Sta. Kitaguchi (North Exit)
Ōme	Ume 74 Kō	梅74甲	Urajukuchō	Kurosawa Iwakura(Loop in Nariki)	Urajukuchō
Ōme	Ume 74 Otsu	梅74乙	Urajukuchō	Kurosawa Iwakura	Kabe Sta. Kitaguchi (North Exit)
Ōme	Ume 76 Hei	梅76丙	Ōme Sta.	Mannenbashi	Yoshino
Ōme	Ume 76 Kō	梅76甲	Urajukuchō	Ōme Sta. Kita-Osoki	Kami-Nariki
Ōme	Ume 77 Hei Orikaeshi	梅77丙折返	Higashi Ōme Ekimae	Nagabuchi Nana-chōme	Ōme Ekimae
Ōme	Ume 77 Kō	梅77甲	Urajukuchō	Kasumibashi	Kabe Sta. Kitaguchi (North Exit)
Ōme	Ume 77 Otsu	梅77乙	Ōme Sta.	(loop in Komakichō)	Ōme Sta.
Ōme	Ume 77 Tei	梅77丁	Ōme Sta.	Higashi-Ōme Sta.	Kabe Sta. Minamiguchi (South Exit)
Rinkai	Aki 26	秋26	Kasai Sta.	Hamachō-Nakanohashi	Akihabara Sta.
Rinkai	Fune 28	船28	Funabori Sta.	Matsue-Yonchū-Dōri	Shinozaki Sta.
Rinkai	Hira 23	平23	Kasai Sta.	Keiyō-Kōsaten	Hirai Sta.
Rinkai	Kame 26	亀26	Imai	Keiyō-Kōsaten	Kameido Sta.
Rinkai	Kasai 22	葛西22	Kasai Sta.	Imai	Ichinoe Sta.
Edogawa	Kasai 24	葛西24	Funabori Sta.	Kasai Sta.	Nagisa New Town
Rinkai	Kasai 26	葛西26	Funabori Sta.	Nishi-Kasai Sta.	Kasai-Rinkai-Kōen Sta. (Kasai Rinkai Park Sta.)
Minami-Senju	Kusa 24	草24	Higashi-Ōjima Sta.	Kameido Sta.	Asakusa-Kotobukichō
Rinkai	Mon 21	門21	Higashi-Ōjima Sta.	Tōyōchō Sta.	Monzen-Nakachō
Rinkai	Nishikatsu 26	西葛26	Funabori Ekimae	Nishi Kasai Ekimae, Tōkyō Rinkai Byōin-mae	Kasai Rinkai Kōen Ekimae
Kōtō	Nishiki 11	錦11	Kameido Sta.Kinshichō Sta.	Shin Ōhashi	Tsukiji Sta.
Rinkai	Rinkai 22	臨海22	Rinkai-Shako (Kasai-rinkai-koen-kita-iriguchi (Kasai Rinkai Park) ) )	Nishi-Kasai Sta.	Funabori Sta.
Rinkai	Rinkai 28-2	臨海28-2	Rinkai-Shako	Nakasakombashi	Kasai Sta.
Rinkai	Rinkai 28-3	臨海28-3	Ichinoe Sta.	Kasai Sta.	Rinkai-Shako (Kasai-rinkai-koen-kita-iriguchi (Kasai Rinkai Park) )
Rinkai	Ryō 28	両28	Rinkai-Shako (Kasai-rinkai-kōen-kita-iriguchi (Kasai Rinkai Park) ) Dairoku-Kasai-Shōgakkō Kasaibashi	Nishi-Ōjima Sta. Kinshichō Sta.	Ryōgoku Sta. Kameido Sta.
Rinkai	Shinko 20	新小20	Higashi-Shin-Koiwa-Yonchōme (Higashi-Shin-Koiwa 4)	Ichinoebashi-Nishizume (Joint service with Keisei Town Bus)	Ichinoe Sta.
Rinkai	Shinko 29	新小29	Tokyo Rinkai-Byōin (Tokyo Rinkai Hp.)	Kasai Sta. Ichinoe Sta.	Higashi-Shin-Koiwa-Yonchōme (Higashi-Shin-Koiwa 4)
Senju	Hata 44	端44	Kita-Senju Sta.	Tabata Sta.	Komagome-Byōin (Komagome Hp.)
Senju	Kita 47	北47	Adachi Seisō Kōjō-mae	Takenotsuka Sta., Adachi Kuyakusho-mae	Kita-Senju Sta.
Senju	Kusa 41	草41	Adachi-Umedachō	Machiya Sta.	Asakusa-Kotobukichō
Senju	Kusa 43	草43	Adachi Kuyakusho	Minowa Station	Asakusa Kaminarimon
Senju	Ō 49	王49	Ōji Sta.	Nishiarai-Daishi	Senju-Shako Adachi-Kuyakusho (Adachi City Office)
Shibuya	Gaku 03	学03	Shibuya Sta.	Kokugakuin-Daigaku (Kokugakuin Univ.)	Nisseki-Iryō Center (Japanese Red Cross Medical Center)
Shibuya	Gaku 06	学06	Ebisu Sta.	Hiroo-Kōkō	Nisseki-Iryō Center (Japanese Red Cross Medical Center)
Shibuya	RH01	RH01	Shibuya Ekimae	Nishi-Azabu	Roppongi Hills
Shibuya	Ta 87	田87	Shibuya Sta.	Ebisu Sta.	Tamachi Sta.
Shibuya	To 01 (T01)	都01	Shibuya Sta.	Roppongi Sta.	Akasaka Ark Hills Shimbashi Sta.
Shibuya	To 06	都06	Shibuya Sta.	Tengenjibashi	Shimbashi Sta.
Shinagawa	I 92	井92	Ōimachi Sta. Higashiguchi (East Exit)	Yashio Park Town loop line	Ōimachi Sta. Higashiguchi (East Exit)
Shinagawa	Ichi 01	市01	Shimbashi Sta.	Kachidoki Sta.	Toyosu-Shijō
Shinagawa	Kuro 77	黒77	Meguro Sta.	Nishi-Azabu	Sendagaya Sta.
Shinagawa	Shina 91	品91	Shinagawa Sta. Kōnanguchi (Kōnan Exit)	Yashio Park Town (loop line)	Shinagawa Sta. Kōnanguchi (Kōnan Exit)
Shinagawa	Shina 93	品93	Ōi Keibajō	Shinagawa Sta. Takanawaguchi (Takanawa Exit)	Meguro Sta.
Shinagawa	Shina 96	品96	Shinagawa Sta. Kōnanguchi (Kōnan Exit)	Tennōzu Isle	Rinkai-sen Tennōzu Isle Sta.
Shinagawa	Shina 98	品98	Shinagawa Sta. Kōnanguchi (Kōnan Exit)	Go-Gō Berth	ŌŌi-Futō Vanpool Ōta-Shijō
Shinagawa	Shina 99	品99	Shinagawa Sta. Kōnanguchi (Kōnan Exit)	Shinagawa Futō (Loop)	Shinagawa Sta. Kōnanguchi (Kōnan Exit)
Kōnan	Tan 96	反96	Gotanda Sta.	Azabujūban Sta.	Roppongi Hills
Shinjuku	Haya 81	早81	Sōdai-Seimon (Waseda Univ.)	Shibuya Sta. Higashiguchi (East Exit) (loop line)	Sōdai-Seimon (Waseda Univ.)
Shibuya	Shibu 88	渋88	Shibuya Sta.	Kamiyachō Sta.	Shimbashi Sta.
Shinjuku	Shuku 74	宿74	Shinjuku Sta. Nishiguchi (West Exit)	Kokuritsu-Kokusai-Iryō-Kenkyū Center (National Center for Global Health and Medicine)	Tokyo Joshi-Idai (Tokyo Women's Medical Univ.)
Shinjuku	Shuku 75	宿75	Shinjuku Sta. Nishiguchi (West Exit)	Tokyo Joshi-Idai (Tokyo Women's Medical Univ.)	Miyakezaka
Sugamo	Cha 07	茶07	Tōdai-Kōnai (The Univ. Of Tokyo)	Ochanomizu Ekimae loop line	Tōdai-Kōnai (The Univ. Of Tokyo)
Sugamo	Cha 51	茶51	Komagome Sta. Minamiguchi (South Exit)	Hongō-Sanchōme Sta. (Hongō 3 Sta.)	Akihabara Sta.
Sugamo	Kusa 63	草63	Ikebukuro Sta. Higashiguchi (East Exit)	Sugamo Sta.	Asakusa-Kotobukichō
Sugamo	Kusa 64	草64	Ikebukuro Sta. Higashiguchi (East Exit	Ōji Sta.	Asakusa-Kaminarimon (Asakusa-Kaminarimon Gate)
Sugamo Senju	Sato 48	里48	Nippori Sta.	Kōhoku Sta.	Kōhoku-Rokuchōme-Danchi (Kōhoku 6 Danchi) Minumadai-Shinsui-Kōen Sta. (Minumadai-Shinsui Park Sta.)
Sugamo Senju	Sato 48-2	里48-2	Nippori Sta.	direct loop line	Nippori Sta.
Sugamo	To 02	都02	Ōtsuka Sta.	Kasuga Sta.	Kinshichō Sta.
Sugamo	Ue 01	上01	Tōdai-Kōnai (The Univ. Of Tokyo)	Ueno-Kōen-Yamashita (Ueno Park) loop line	Tōdai-Kōnai (The Univ. Of Tokyo)
Sugamo	Ue 60	上60	Ikebukuro Sta. Higashiguchi (East Exit)	Ōtsuka Sta.	Ueno-Kōen (Ueno Park)
Suginami	Ō 78	王78	Shinjuku Sta. Nishiguchi (West Exit)	Yamatochō	Ōji Sta.
Suginami	Shibu 66	渋66	Asagaya Sta.	Daitabashi (Joint service with KEIO BUS)	Shibuya Sta.
Suginami; Kōnan Shinjuku	Shina 97	品97	Shinagawa-Shako Shinagawa Sta. Takanawaguchi (Takanawa Exit)	Tengenjibashi	Shinjuku Sta. Nishiguchi (West Exit)
Suginami	Shuku 91	宿91	Shinjuku Sta. Nishiguchi (West Exit)	Higashi-Kōenji Sta.	Shin-Daita Sta.
Otakibashi	Taka 71	高71	Takadanobaba Sta.	Tokyo Joshi-Idai (Tokyo Women's Medical Univ.)	Kudanshita
Waseda	Ike 86	池86	Ikebukuro Sunshinecity	Shibuya Sta. Higashiguchi (East Exit) loop route	Ikebukuro Sunshinecity
Waseda	Ike 86 Shutsunyū	池86出入	Ikebukuro SunshinecityShibuya Sta. Higashiguchi (East Exit)	(Direct link)	Waseda
Waseda	Haya 77	早77	Shinjuku Sta. Nishiguchi (West Exit)	Takadanobaba-Nichōme (Takadanobaba 2)	Waseda
Waseda	Ue 58	上58	Waseda	Kami-Fujimae	Ueno Matsuzakaya

There are also some non-regular routes, including those for Tokyo Big Sight, the National Theatre of Japan, Edogawa Kyōtei Course, the Tokyo Bay Great Fireworks, and the Sumidagawa Fireworks Festival.

== Vehicles ==
There are 1,467 buses used by TMBT. These are manufactured by Isuzu Motors, Hino Motors, Nissan Diesel, Mitsubishi Fusō and Volgren (imported from Australia). The bureau is keen on introducing vehicles with accessibility feature, such as non-step buses. By the end of 2024, all buses became non-step buses. The bureau also employs relatively many eco-friendly vehicles as Japanese bus operator, including hybrid buses, 75 fuel cell and 2 electric buses.

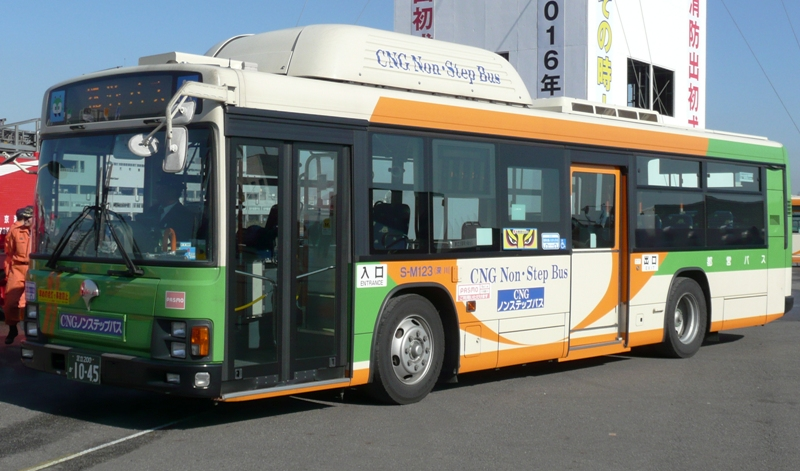
Isuzu Erga CNG PJ-LV834L1

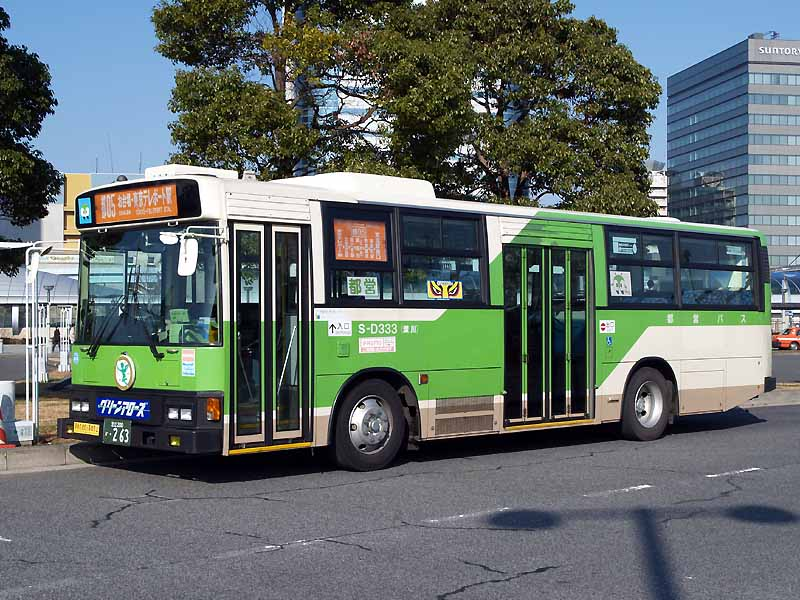
Hino Blue Ribbon KC-HU2MLCA

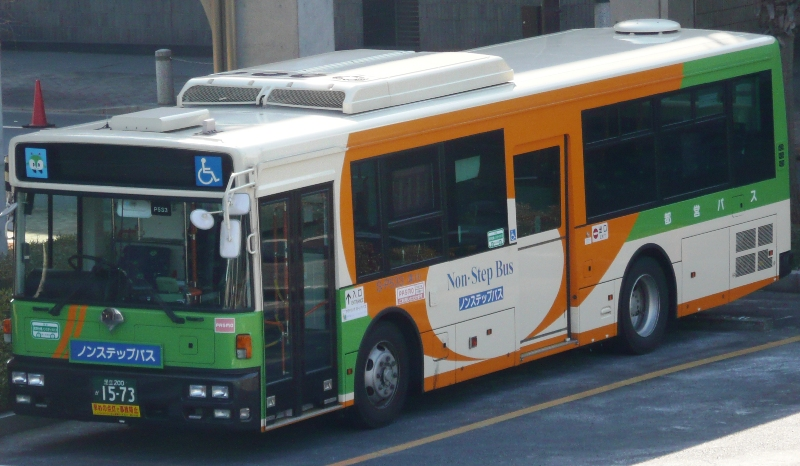
Nissan Diesel Space Runner RA PKG-RA274KAN

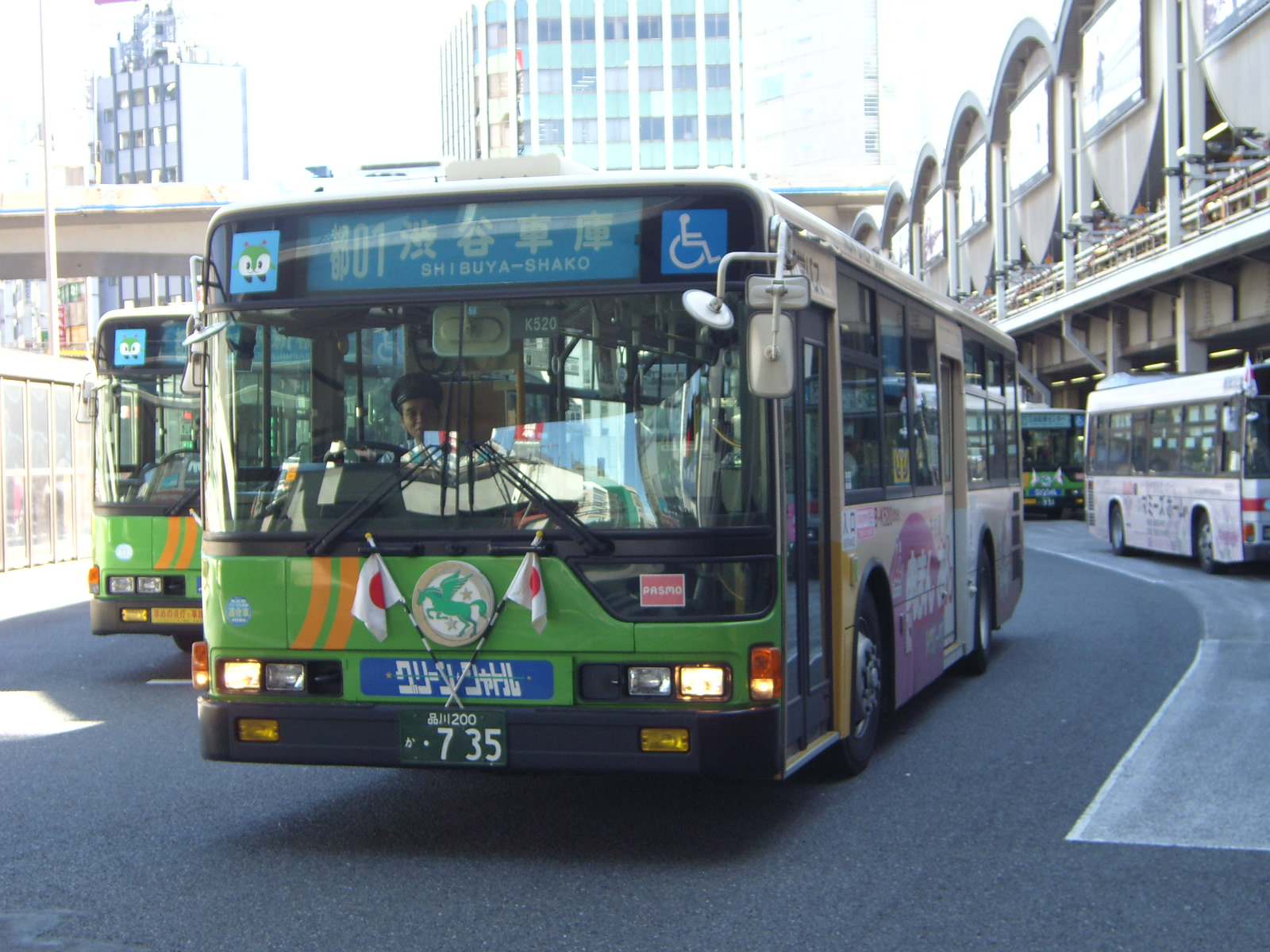
Mitsubishi Fuso Aero Star KL-MP37JK

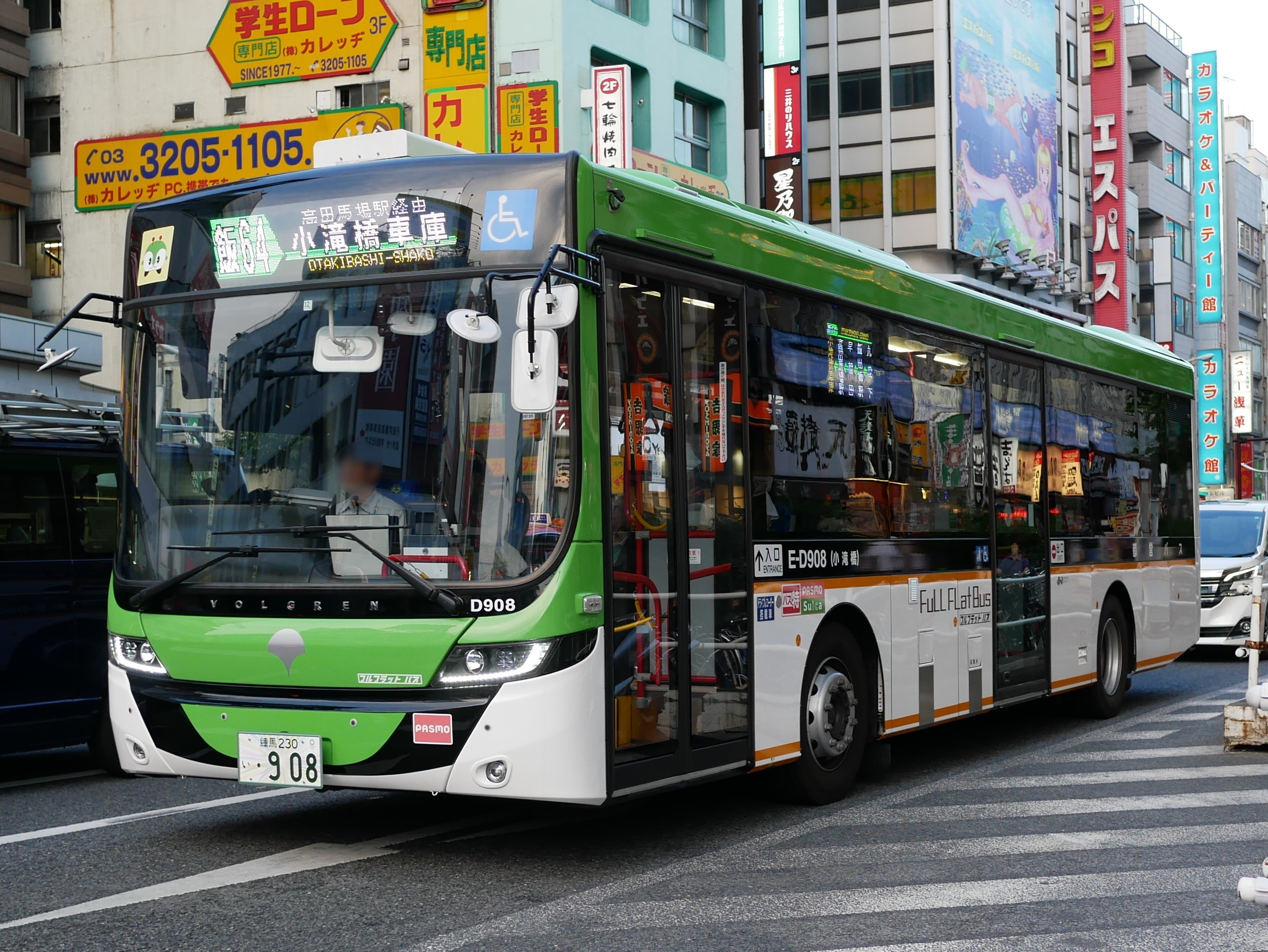
Volgren Optimus bodied Scania N280UB

== Fares ==
For the routes in the special wards of Tokyo, the adult fares are as follows, regardless of the distance. Riders get on a bus from a front door, and get off from a rear door.

- Regular routes: ¥210
- Gaku Bus: ¥180

The routes designated with the kanji 学 (gaku). They mainly transport college students.

- Shuttle Bus (C-H 01): ¥190
- Access Line Bus (AL 01): ¥100
- Midnight 25: ¥420

Night bus routes, designated with the kanji 深夜 (shin'ya "midnight").

For the routes in Ōme, the fare varies depending on the distance. Riders get on a bus from a rear door, and get off from a front door.

All the Toei Bus cars accept Common Bus Card, a magnetic fare collection card, as well as PASMO and Suica, contactless smart cards.

== See also ==
- List of bus operating companies in Japan
- Transportation in Greater Tokyo
