= Funabori Station =

Metro station in Tokyo, Japan

Coordinates: 35.683742°N 139.864335°E

Funabori Station 船堀駅

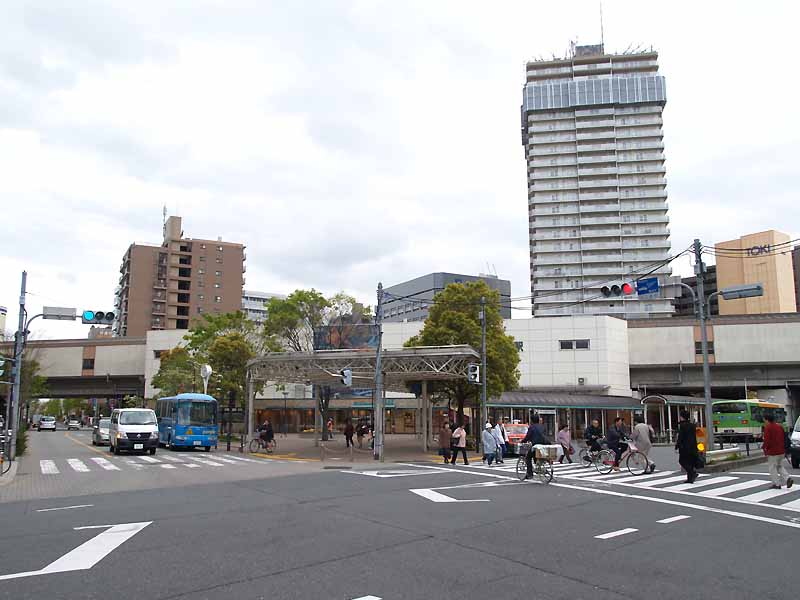
- North entrance of Funabori Station

General information
- Location: 3-6-1 Funabori, Edogawa City, Tokyo （東京都江戸川区船堀三丁目6-1） Japan
- Operator: Toei Subway
- Line: Shinjuku Line
- Platforms: 2 side platforms
- Tracks: 2
- Connections: Bus stop

Construction
- Structure type: Elevated

Other information
- Station code: S-17

History
- Opened: 23 December 1983; 42 years ago

Passengers
- 22,193 daily

Services
Preceding station	Toei Subway	Following station
Ojima towards Shinjuku	Shinjuku Line Express	Motoyawata Terminus
Higashi-ojima towards Shinjuku	Shinjuku Line Local	Ichinoe towards Motoyawata
Location
- Location within Special wards of Tokyo Location within Tokyo Bay and Bōsō Peninsula Location within Tokyo Location within Japan

Funabori Station (船堀駅, Funabori-eki) is a subway station in Edogawa, Tokyo, Japan, operated by Toei Subway. Its station number is S-17.

== Line ==
Funabori Station is served by the Toei Shinjuku Line.

== Station layout ==
Funabori Station consists of two side platforms served by two tracks.

=== Platforms ===
1	Shinjuku Line	for Shinjuku; Keio Line for Sasazuka, Hashimoto and Takaosanguchi
2	Shinjuku Line	for Motoyawata

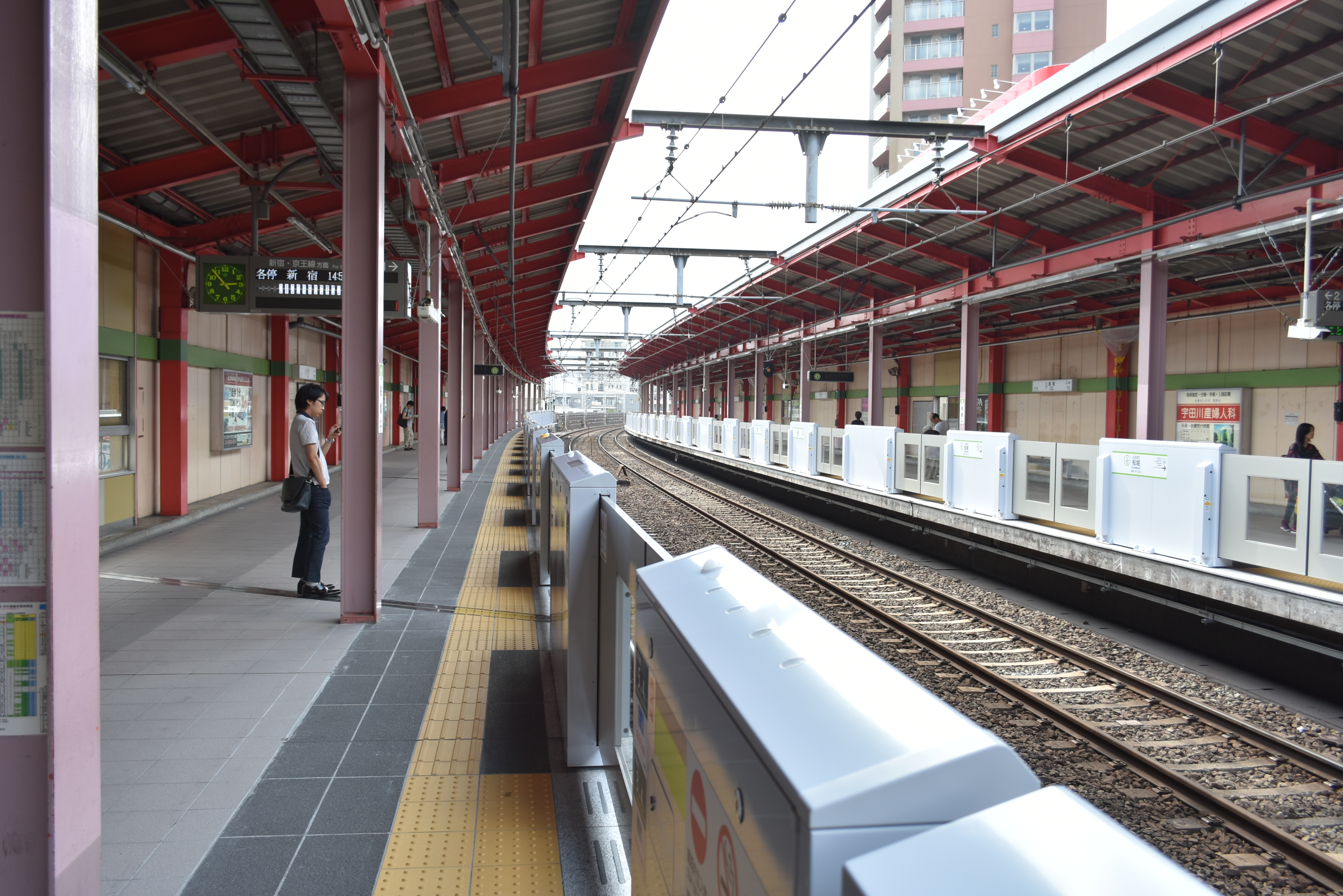
The platforms

== History ==
The station opened on December 23, 1983.

== Surrounding area ==
The station is located just west of Tokyo Metropolitan Route 308 (Funabori-kaidō). Tower Hall Funabori, an Edogawa city citizen's hall, is north of the station. Although the immediate area has several large apartment and office buildings, the area is a mix of commercial, residential, and light industrial uses. Other points of interest include:

- Indian Temple - ISKCON New Gaya Japan & Vedic Culture Center
- Tokyo Kenkō Land
- Edogawa Municipal Matsue No. 1 Junior High School
- Funabori Post Office
- Kasai Police Station, Funabori branch
- Edogawa Municipal Funabori Elementary School
- Edogawa Municipal Funabori No. 2 Elementary School
- Funabori Sports Park
- Tathva International School

== Connecting bus services ==
All services are operated by Toei Bus.

=== North exit ===
- Stop 3
  - Shinko 21: for Nishi-Kasai Station
  - Rinkai 22: for Rinkai garage
- Stop 4
- Kasai 24: for Nagisa New Town via Kasai Citizen's Hall & Kasai Station
- Stop 5
  - Kin 25: for Nishi-Kasai
  - FL01: for Nishi-Kasai (weekends and holidays only)
- Stop 6
  - Kin 25: for Kinshichō Station via Keiyō intersection
  - FL01: for Kinshichō Station via Higashi-Ōjima Station entrance (weekends and holidays only)

=== South exit ===
- Stop 1
  - Shinko 21: for Shin-Koiwa Station
  - Kin 27-2: for Koiwa Station
- Stop 2
  - Kasai 26: for Kasai-Rinkai Park Station
  - Funa 28: for Shinozaki Station
  - Tei 11: for Edogawa-kyōteijō (free)
