= Ichinoe Station =

Metro station in Tokyo, Japan

Coordinates: 35.686026°N 139.882949°E

Ichinoe Station 一之江駅

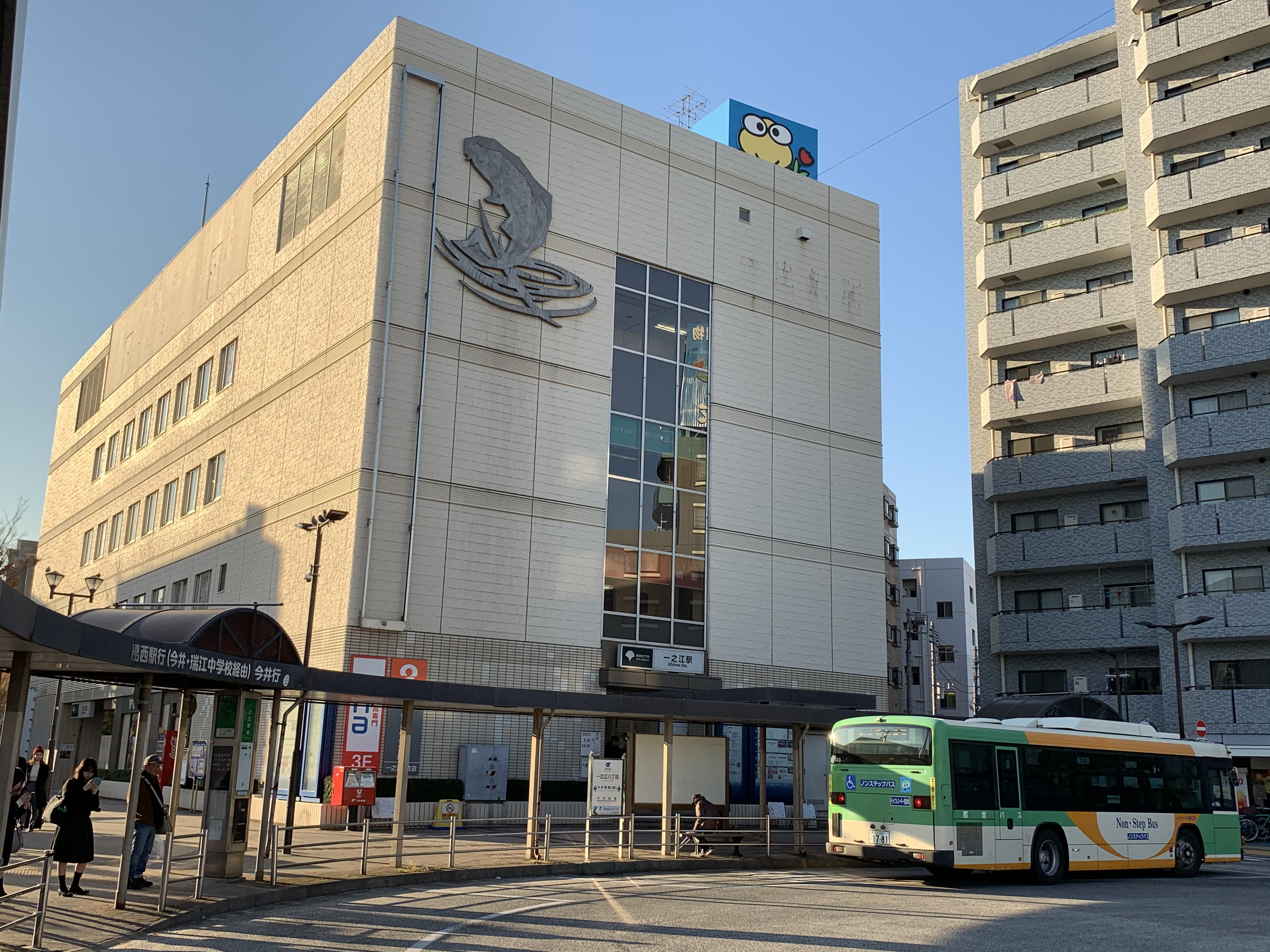
- Ichinoe Station building

General information
- Location: 8-14-1 Ichinoe, Edogawa City, Tokyo （東京都江戸川区一之江八丁目14-1） Japan
- Operator: Toei Subway
- Line: Shinjuku Line
- Platforms: 1 island platform
- Tracks: 2
- Connections: Bus terminal

Construction
- Structure type: Underground

Other information
- Station code: S-18

History
- Opened: 14 September 1986; 39 years ago

Passengers
- 36,545 daily

Services
| Preceding station | Toei Subway | Following station |
|---|---|---|
| Funabori towards Shinjuku | Shinjuku Line Local | Mizue towards Motoyawata |
Location
- Location within Special wards of Tokyo Location within Tokyo Bay and Bōsō Peninsula Location within Tokyo Location within Japan

Ichinoe Station (一之江駅, Ichinoe-eki) is a railway station in Edogawa City, Tokyo, Japan. Its station number is S-18. The station opened on 14 September 1986.

== Platforms ==
Ichinoe Station consists of a single island platform served by two tracks.

| 1 | Shinjuku Line | for Bakuro-yokoyama, Shinjuku; Keio Line for Sasazuka, Hashimoto and Takaosanguchi |
| 2 | Shinjuku Line | for Motoyawata |

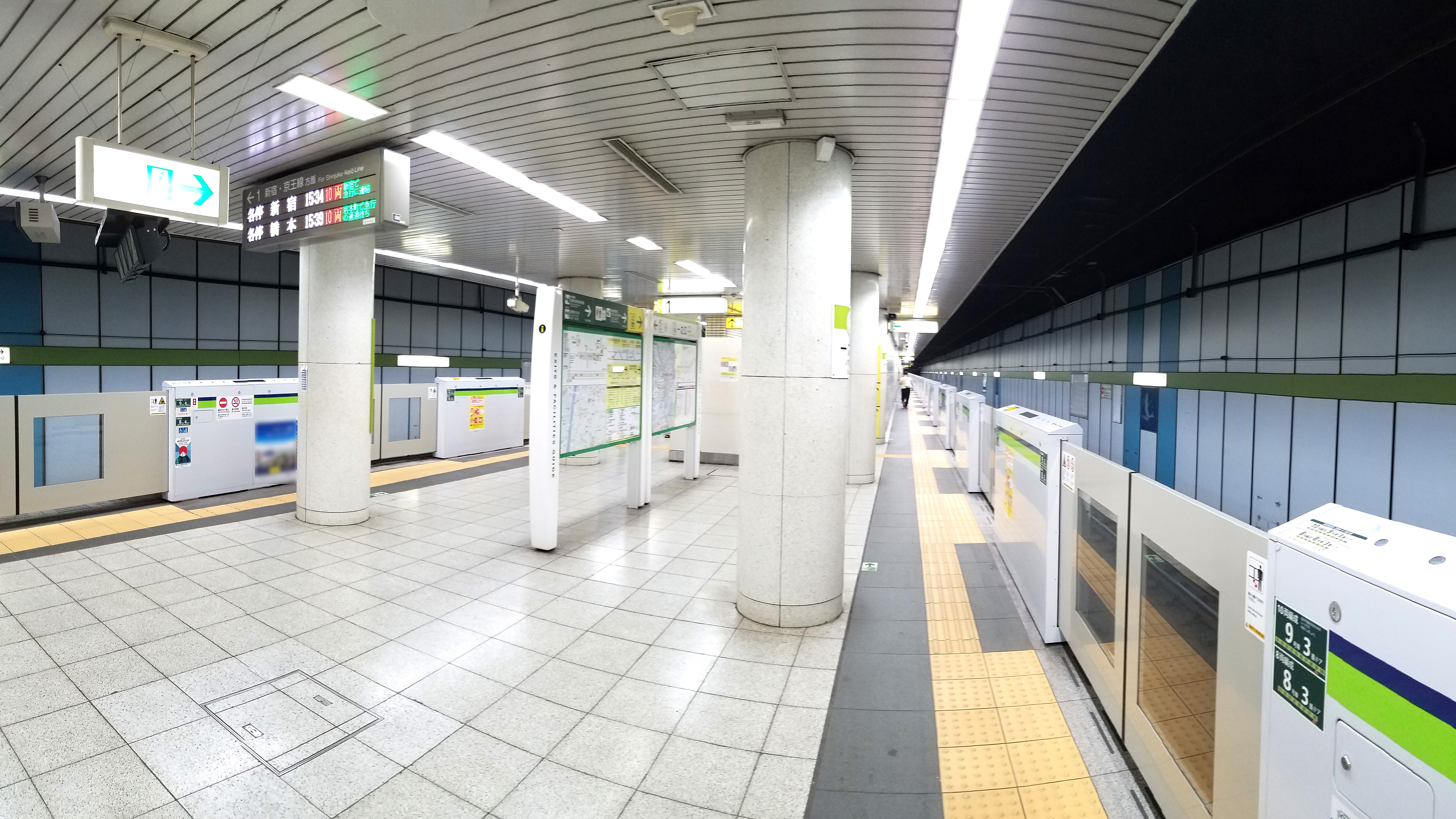
Platforms

== Surrounding area ==
The station is located underground southeast of the intersection of Tokyo Metropolitan Routes 50 (Imai-kaidō) and 318 (Kannana-dōri). There are several apartment buildings immediately around the station, with single-family residences beyond. The Shin-Naka River lies to the east. Other points of interest include:

- Tokyo Prefectural Kasai Commercial High School
- Edogawa Municipal Ichinoe Elementary School
- Edogawa Municipal Ichinoe No. 2 Elementary School
- Edogawa Municipal Ichinoe Junior High School
- Mizue-Ōhashi bridge
- Edogawa Municipal Mizue Elementary School

== Connecting bus service ==
Stop: Ichinoe-Ekimae

- Stop 1
  - Shinko 22: for Shin-Koiwa-Ekimae, Funabori-Ekimae (Toei Bus)
- Stop 2
  - Shinko 22: for Kasai-Ekimae (Toei)
  - Kame 26: for Imai (Toei)
- Stop 3
  - Kasai 22: for Kasai-Ekimae via Kaminari (Toei)
  - Shinko 29-Otsu: for Haruemachi terminal (Toei)
- Stop 4
  - Ko 72: For Koiwa Station, Edogawa Sports Land (Keisei Bus)
- Stop 5
  - Kame 26: for Kameido-Ekimae (Toei)
  - Shinko 29-Otsu: for Higashi-Shin-Koiwa 4-chōme (Toei)
  - Ko 76: for Kasai-Ekimae (Keisei)
- Stop 6
  - Ko 76: Koiwa Station via Nanushiyashiki (Keisei)
- Stop 7
  - Rinkai 28-Kō: for Kasairinkaikōen-Ekimae via Kannana and Kasai Station (Toei)
  - Rinkai 28-Otsu: for Rinkai-Shako-mae via Kannana and Kasai Station (Toei)
  - Kasai 22: for Rinkai-Shako (Toei)
  - Shinko 29: for Kasai-Ekimae (Toei)
  - Shinko 30: for Tokyo Rinkai Hospital (Toei)
- Stop 8
  - Rinkai 28-Kō, Rinkai 28-Otsu: For Ichinoebashi-Nishizume (Toei)
  - Shinko 29-Kō, Shinko-30: for Higashi-Shin-Koiwa 4-chōme (Toei)
  - Kan 07: Express for Koiwa Station (Keisei)
  - Kan 08: Express for Kameari Station (Keisei)
- Stop 9
  - Shinko 20: for Higashi-Shin-Koiwa 4-chōme (Toei, Keisei Town Bus)
- Stop 10
  - for Haneda Airport (Keisei, Airport Transport Service)
  - for Narita Airport (Keisei)
  - Kan 07, Kan 08: Express for Kasairinkaikōen-Ekimae, Tokyo Disney Resort (Keisei)

Stop: Ichinoe-Eki-Kannanaguchi

- Ko 76: for Kasai-Ekimae, Koiwa Station (Keisei)

== Line ==
- Tokyo Metropolitan Bureau of Transportation - Toei Shinjuku Line
