= Higashi-ojima Station =

Metro station in Tokyo, Japan

Coordinates: 35.69034°N 139.845967°E

Higashi-ojima Station 東大島駅

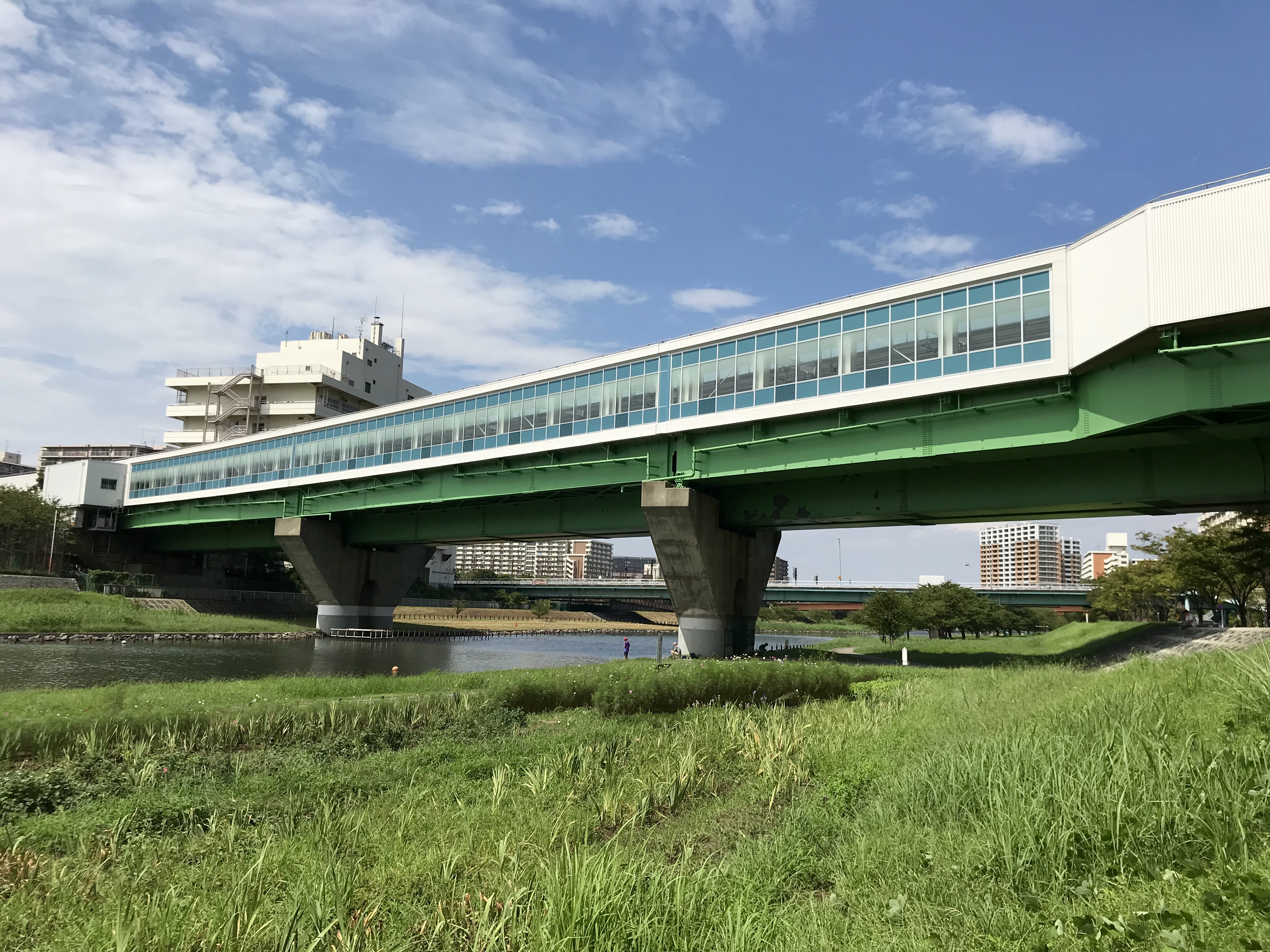
- Higashi-ojima Station, August 2019

General information
- Location: 9-3-14 Ōjima, Kōtō City, Tokyo （東京都江東区大島9-3-14） Japan
- Operator: Toei Subway
- Line: Shinjuku Line
- Platforms: 2 side platforms
- Tracks: 2
- Connections: Bus stop

Construction
- Structure type: Elevated

Other information
- Station code: S-16

History
- Opened: 21 December 1978; 47 years ago

Passengers
- 30,062 daily

Services
Preceding station	Toei Subway	Following station
Ojima towards Shinjuku	Shinjuku Line Local	Funabori towards Motoyawata
Location
- Location within Special wards of Tokyo Location within Tokyo Bay and Bōsō Peninsula Location within Tokyo Location within Japan

Higashi-ojima Station (東大島駅, Higashi-ōjima-eki) is a railway station in Kōtō, Ojima, Tokyo, Japan. Its station number is S-16 and is served by the Toei Shinjuku Line. The station opened on December 21, 1978. It is a station in the form of a bridge over the Kyu-Naka river.

== Platforms ==
Higashi-ojima Station consists of two side platforms served by two tracks. It has two exits on the two ends of the platform. These are the Komatsugawa exit and the Ojima exit.

1	Shinjuku Line	for Shinjuku; Keio Line for Sasazuka, Hashimoto and Takaosanguchi
2	Shinjuku Line	for Motoyawata

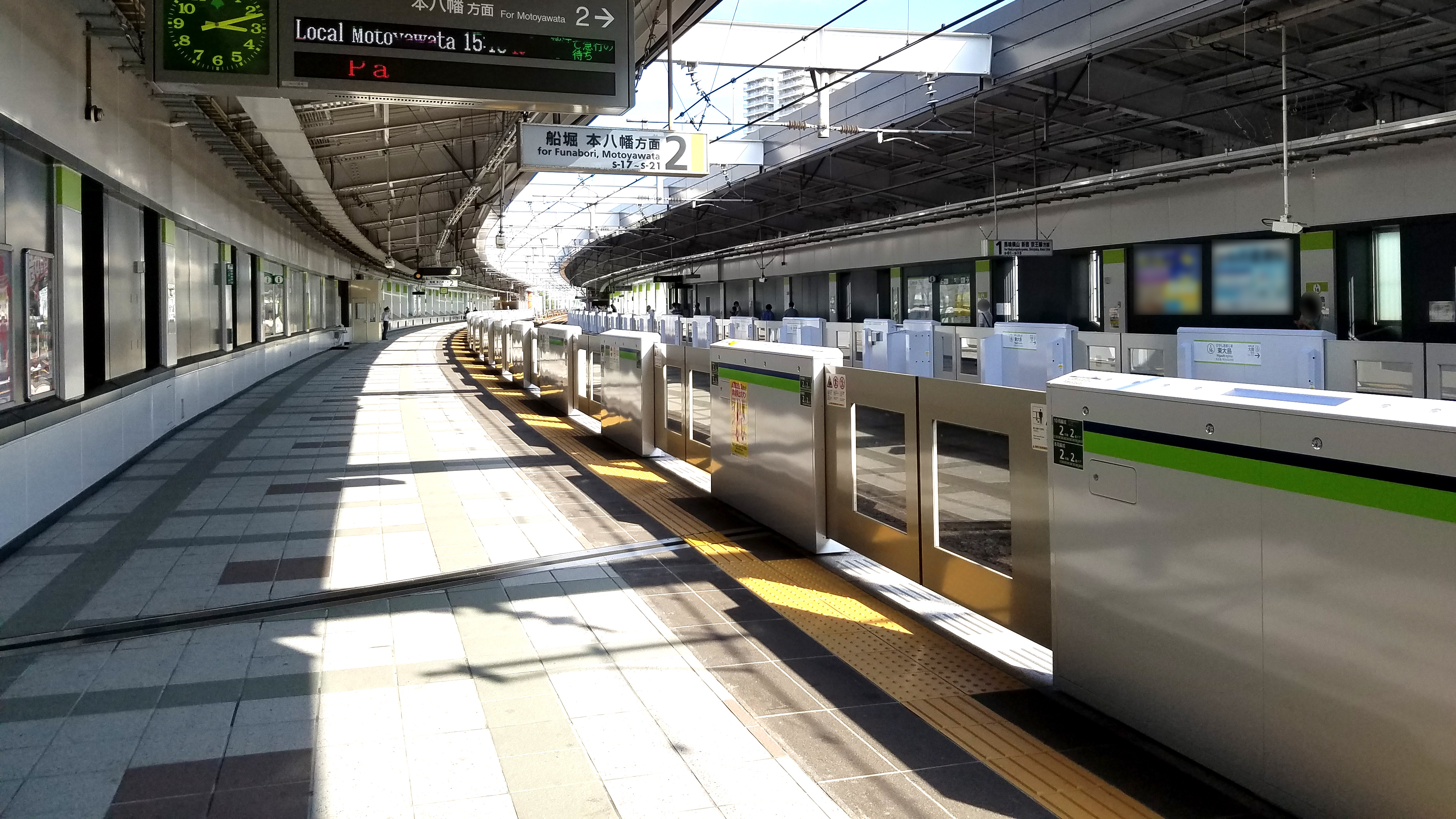
Platforms

== Surrounding area ==
The station is located on top of the Kyu-Naka River as a bridge, northeast of the intersection of Tokyo Metropolitan Routes 50 (Shin-Ōhashi-dōri) and 477 (Banshobashi-dōri), with the station platforms stretching across the Kyū-Naka River. The station lies in the midst of several parks and recreational facilities, with the Komatsugawa danchi owned by Urban Renaissance to the southeast. Other points of interest include:

- Arakawa River
- Ōjima-Komatsugawa Park
- Higashi-Ōjima Library
- Jōtō Social Insurance Hospital

== Connecting bus service ==
Toei Bus

- Higashi-Ōjima-Ekimae (Ōjima-guchi)
  - Mon 21: for Monzen-Nakachō Station via Kame-Takahashi and Tōyōchō Station
  - Kusa 24: for Asakusa-Kotobukichō
  - Kin 28: for Kinshichō-Ekimae
  - Yō 20: for Tōyōchō Station via Kōtō Geriatric Medical Center
  - (none): for Kasaibashi
- Higashi-Ōjima-Eki-Iriguchi
  - Kame 24: for Kasaibashi, Kameido Station, Higashi-Ōjima-Ekimae
  - FL01: for Kinshichō-Ekimae, Kasai-Ekimae
- Higashi-Ōjima-Ekimae (Komatsugawa-guchi)
  - Hira 28: for Hirai-Sōshajo
  - AL01: for Cherry Garden (loop)

== Line ==
- Tokyo Metropolitan Bureau of Transportation - Toei Shinjuku Line
