= Hirai Station =

Hirai Station is the name of two train stations in Japan:

- Hirai Station (Ehime)
- Hirai Station (Tokyo)
