= Ojima Station =

Metro station in Tokyo, Japan

Coordinates: 35.689885°N 139.835641°E

Ojima Station 大島駅

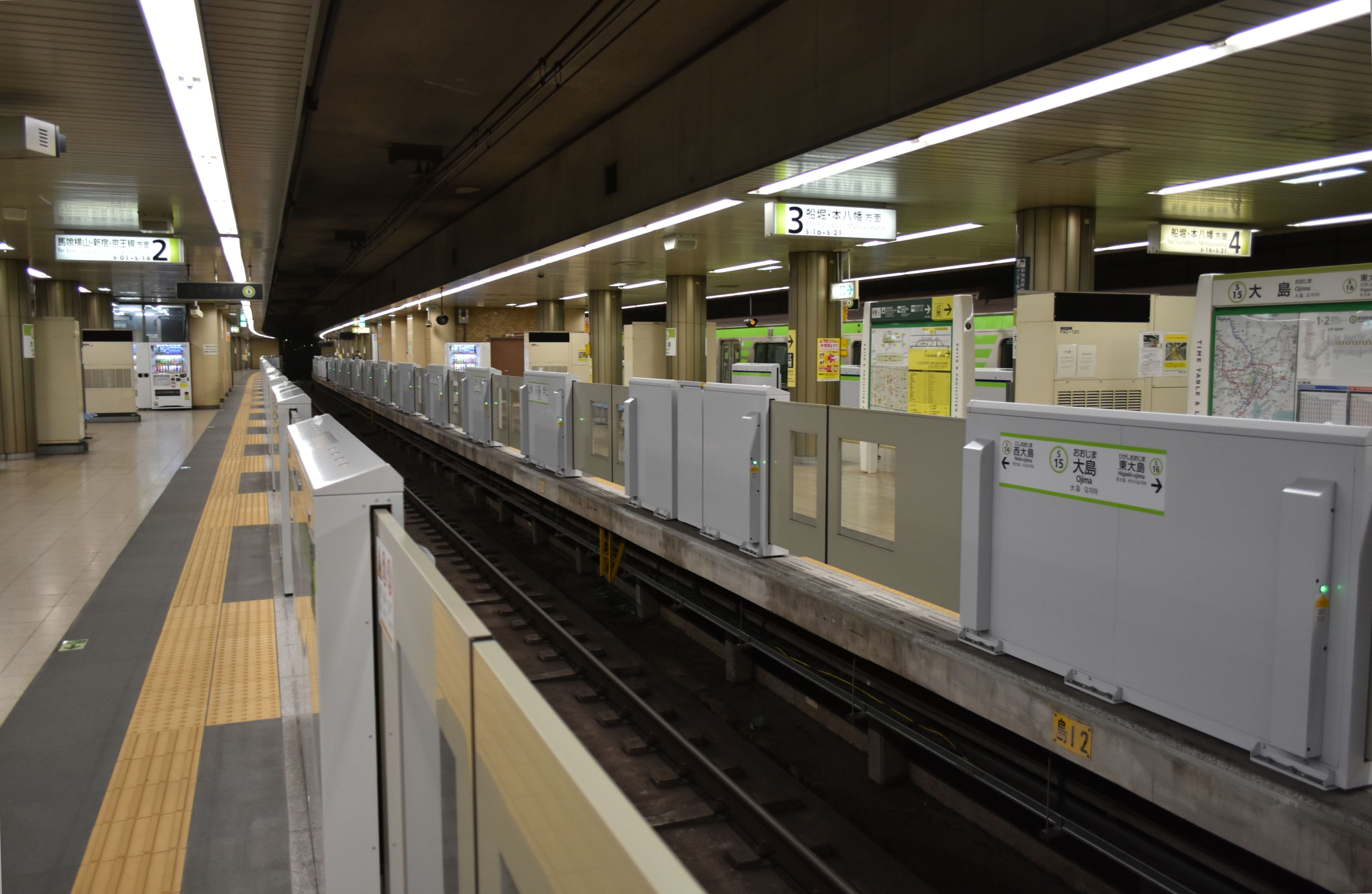
- Ojima Station platforms

General information
- Location: 5-10-8 Ōjima, Kōtō City, Tokyo （東京都江東区大島5-10-8） Japan
- Operator: Toei Subway
- Line: Shinjuku Line
- Platforms: 1 island platform, 1 side platform
- Tracks: 3
- Connections: Bus stop

Construction
- Structure type: Underground

Other information
- Station code: S-15

History
- Opened: 21 December 1978; 47 years ago

Passengers
- 87,562 daily

Services
Preceding station	Toei Subway	Following station
Morishita towards Shinjuku	Shinjuku Line Express	Funabori towards Motoyawata
Nishi-ojima towards Shinjuku	Shinjuku Line Local	Higashi-ojima towards Motoyawata
Location
- Location within Special wards of Tokyo Location within Tokyo Bay and Bōsō Peninsula Location within Tokyo Location within Japan

Ojima Station (大島駅, Ōjima-eki) is a railway station in Kōtō, Ojima, Tokyo, Japan. Its station number is S-15. The station opened on December 21, 1978.

== Platforms ==
Ojima Station consists of two island platforms served by three tracks.

1	Shinjuku Line	for Shinjuku; Keio Line for Sasazuka and Hashimoto
2	Shinjuku Line	for Shinjuku; Keio Line for Sasazuka and Hashimoto (used for waiting for passing expresses or terminating trains)
3	Shinjuku Line	for Motoyawata (used for waiting for passing expresses or terminating trains)
4	Shinjuku Line	for Motoyawata

== Surrounding area ==
The station is located underneath Tokyo Metropolitan Route 50 (Shin-Ōhashi-dōri) near its intersection with Tokyo Metropolitan Route 476 (Kyūhachi-dōri). The Shuto Expressway's No. 7 Komatsugawa Line is half a kilometer to the north. The area is a mix of commercial, residential, and light industrial.

== Connecting bus service ==
Toei Bus: Ōjima-Ekimae

- Kusa 24: for Asakusa-Kotobukichō
- Kame 24: for Kasaibashi; via Nishi-Ōjima Station for Kameido Station
- Kame 21: for Tōyōchō Station; via Suijinmori for Kameido Station
