= Tokyo Metro Museum =

- 地下鉄博物館
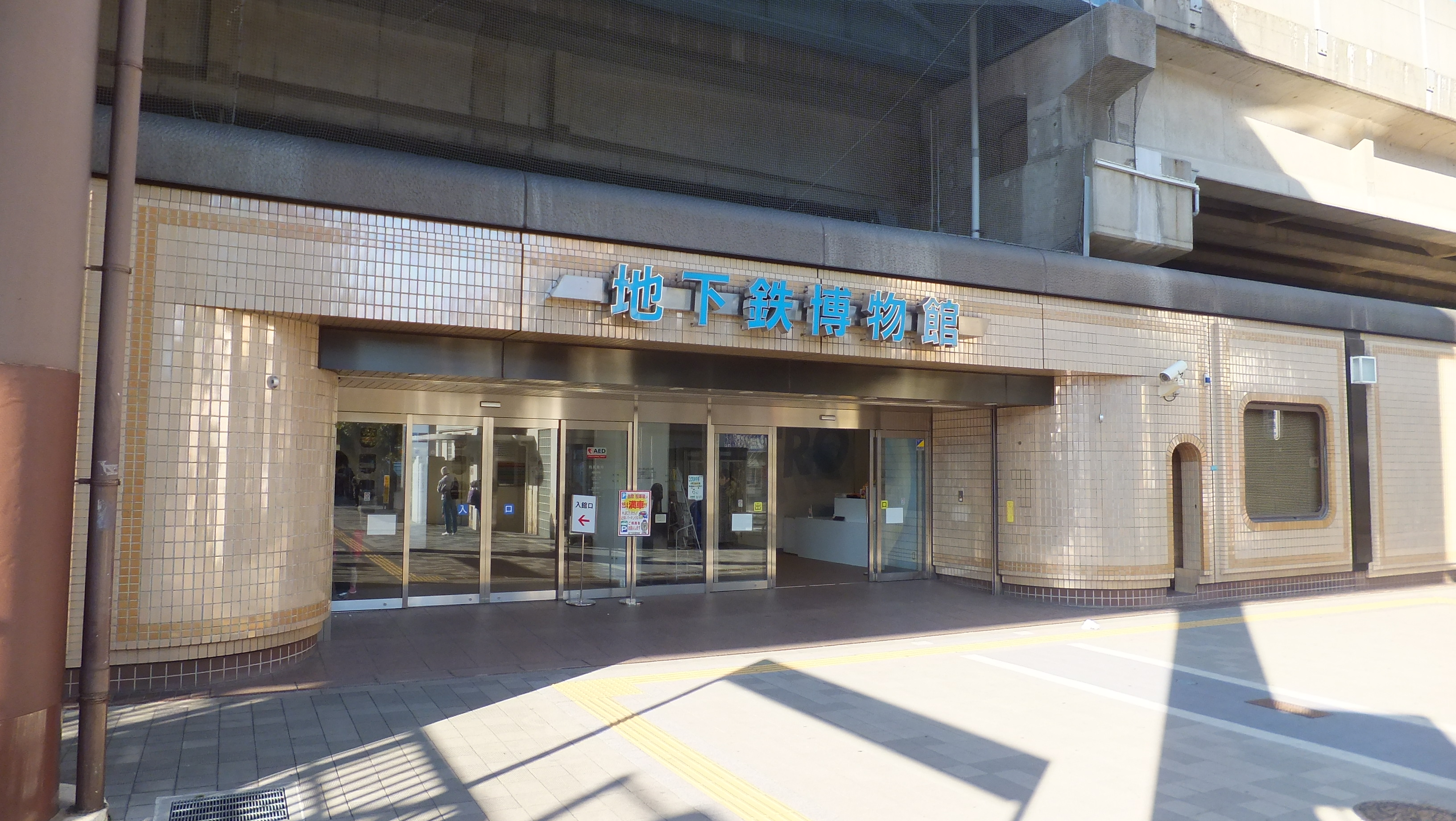
- Entrance to the Museum
- Established: 12 July 1986
- Location: Edogawa, Tokyo
- Coordinates: 35.6635°N 139.8738°E
- Type: Railway museum
- Owner: Metro Cultural Foundation
- Website: www.chikahaku.jp/en/

The Tokyo Metro Museum is a railway museum located in Edogawa Ward in Tokyo, Japan. The museum is owned by the Metro Cultural Foundation, a non-profit organization of the Tokyo Metro. It is located a short 100 meters from Kasai Station.

Visitors enter the museum through a subway ticket gate, leading to a section of Tokyo’s first underground line between Ueno and Asakusa that opened in 1927 (now a part of the Ginza Line).

== Collection ==
The museum displays some examples of the rolling stock used in the Tokyo metro system, including a car from an Eidan 300 train that ran on the Marunouchi Line and a car from an Eidan 1000 train from the Ginza Line. The museum includes seven main exhibit spaces, explaining the history and construction of the Metro system, passenger services in the system, Metro system safety and descriptions of subways found around the world. Driving simulators are also available for visitors to try.

=== Collection details ===
Upon entry through a subway automatic ticket gate, visitors are presented with an exhibit on the relationship between the city and the subway over the years and reconstruction of the Ueno station (first subway station on the line), as it appeared in 1927. Next are more technical exhibits, focusing on the construction of the subway tunnels and safety of the lines, with details about the anti-flood system and an explanation on the traffic-control and power control centres and the workings of the disaster prevention centre.

The next section of the museum displays a Series 100 subway car, allowing visitors enter the cab and use various car controls including the motors, the brakes and the pantograph. Scale examples show the electrical collection system used by the subway including the pantograph and the third rail, along with working examples of electric motors and bogie brakes. The next section of the museum contains actual simulators once used to train system employees, one of three simulators visitors can try under supervision of museum staff.

Finally, the museum has a lecture hall, a lounge and a library with a collection of subway-related works.
