= Shin-Koiwa =

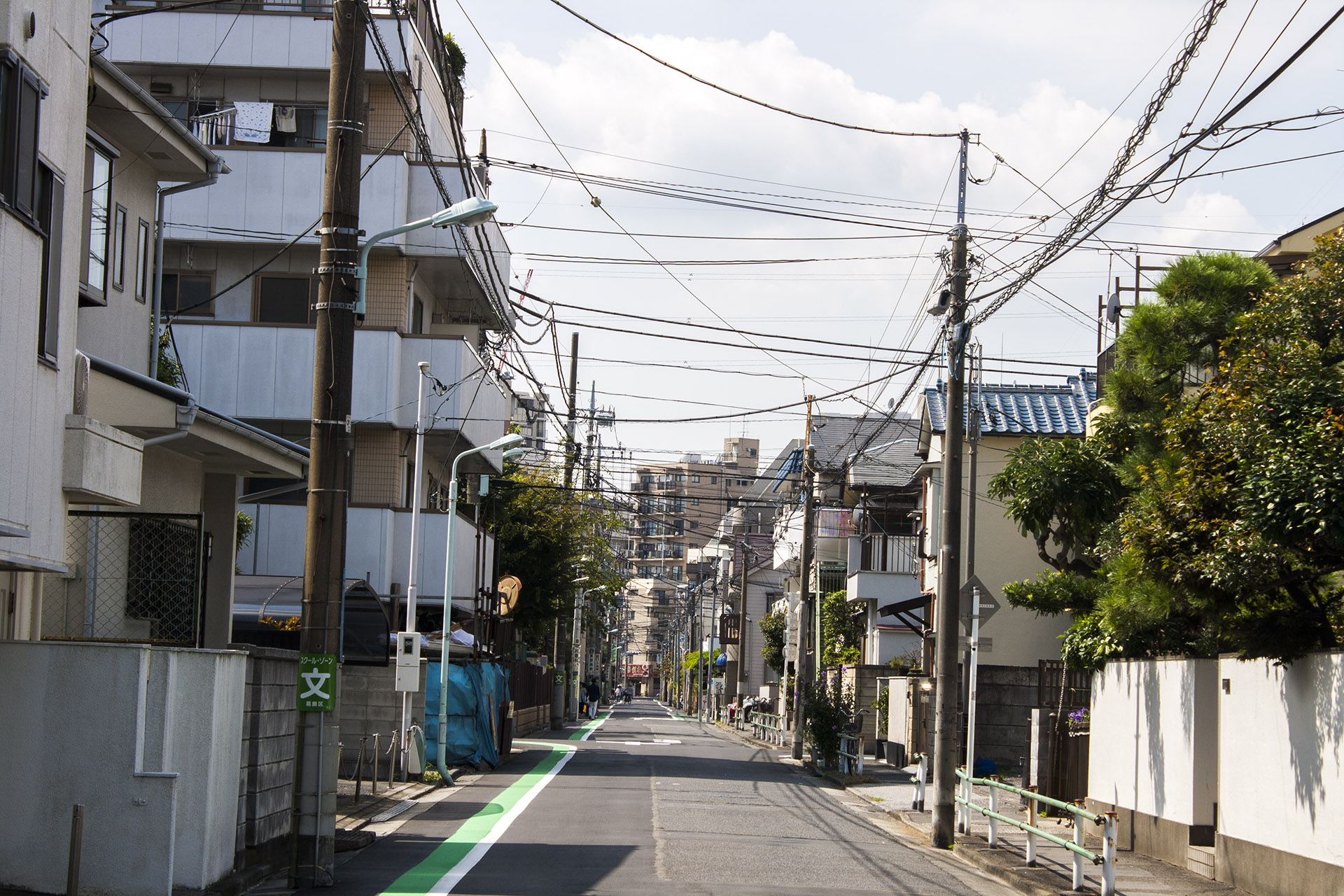
Residential street in Shinkoiwa

Shin-Koiwa (新小岩, literally "New small rock") is a neighborhood next to Koiwa in Katsushika, Tokyo, Japan. The neighborhood's main traffic hub is Shin-Koiwa Station served by the Sōbu and Chūō-Sōbu Lines.

As of 2000, the neighborhood is home to some 20,496 people.

Most of the shopping and business life is centered on the station square and shōtengai shopping street extending from the station.
