= Mejiro Station =

Railway station in Tokyo, Japan

Coordinates: 35.720995°N 139.706880°E

JY14 Mejiro Station 目白駅
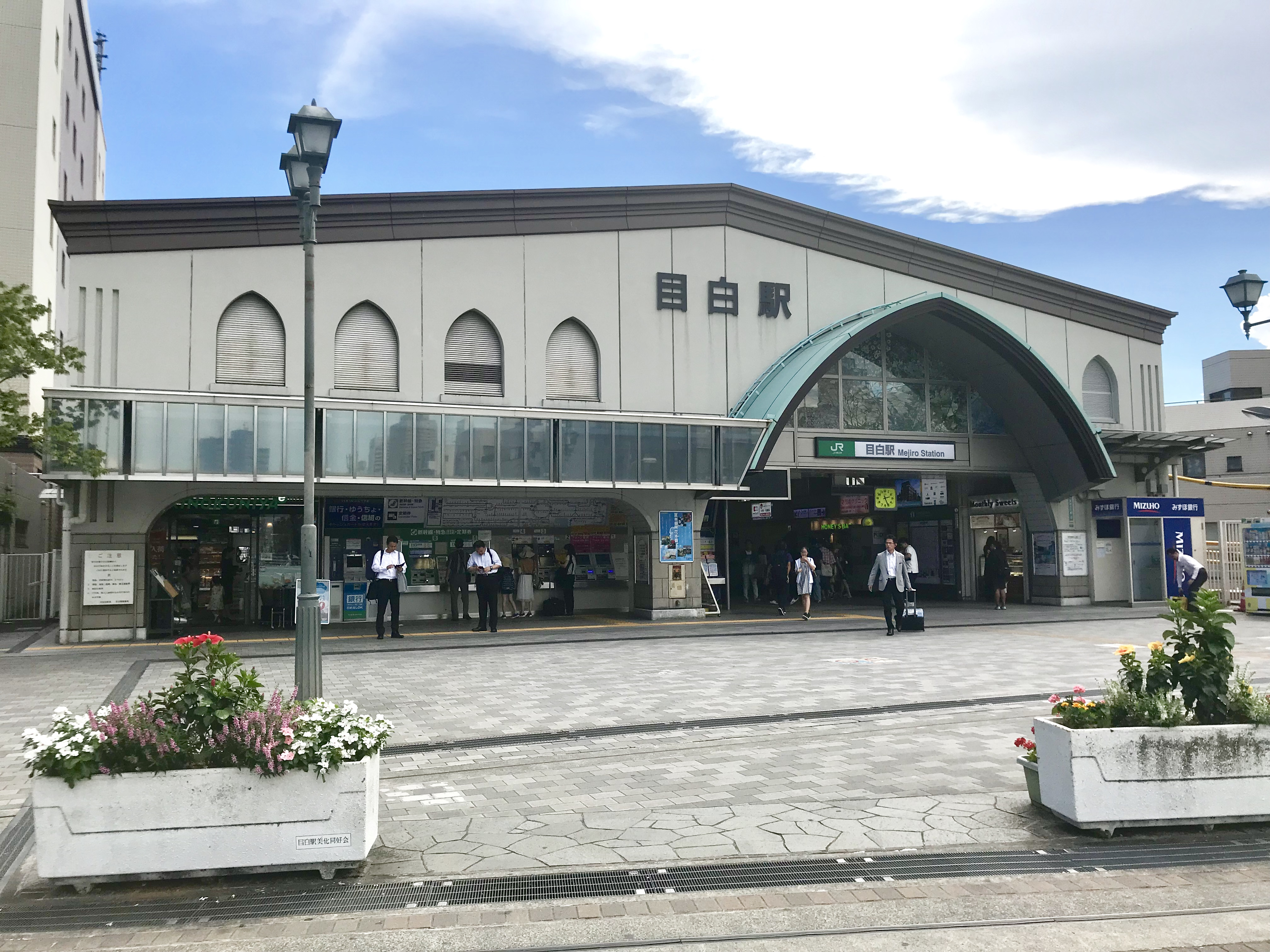
- Mejiro Station in August 2019

General information
- Location: 3 Mejiro, Toshima City, Tokyo; Japan
- Operator: JR East
- Line: Yamanote Line
- Platforms: 1 island platform
- Tracks: 2
- Connections: Bus stop

Construction
- Structure type: At grade

Other information
- Station code: JY14

History
- Opened: 16 March 1885; 141 years ago

Passengers
- FY2024: 67,082 (daily)

Services
Preceding station	JR East	Following station
Takadanobaba JY15 Next counter-clockwise	Yamanote Line	Ikebukuro Next clockwise
Location
- Location within Tokyo Yamanote Loop Location within Tokyo wards area Location within Japan

Mejiro Station (目白駅, Mejiro-eki) is a railway station on the Yamanote Line in Toshima, Tokyo, Japan, operated by the East Japan Railway Company (JR East).

== Lines ==
Mejiro Station is served by the circular Yamanote Line. It is one of only two stations on the Yamanote Line that does not provide a direct connection to any other line, the other being Shin-Ōkubo.

== Station layout ==
Mejiro Station has one island platform serving two tracks. The station building is located above the tracks, and accessibility to and from the platforms is provided by escalators as well as lifts. There are several small shops and a bakery/cafe within the station.

Platform edge doors were installed and brought into use from 9 November 2013.

=== Platforms ===
1	Yamanote Line	for Shinjuku, Shibuya, and Shinagawa
2	Yamanote Line	for Ikebukuro, Nippori, and Ueno

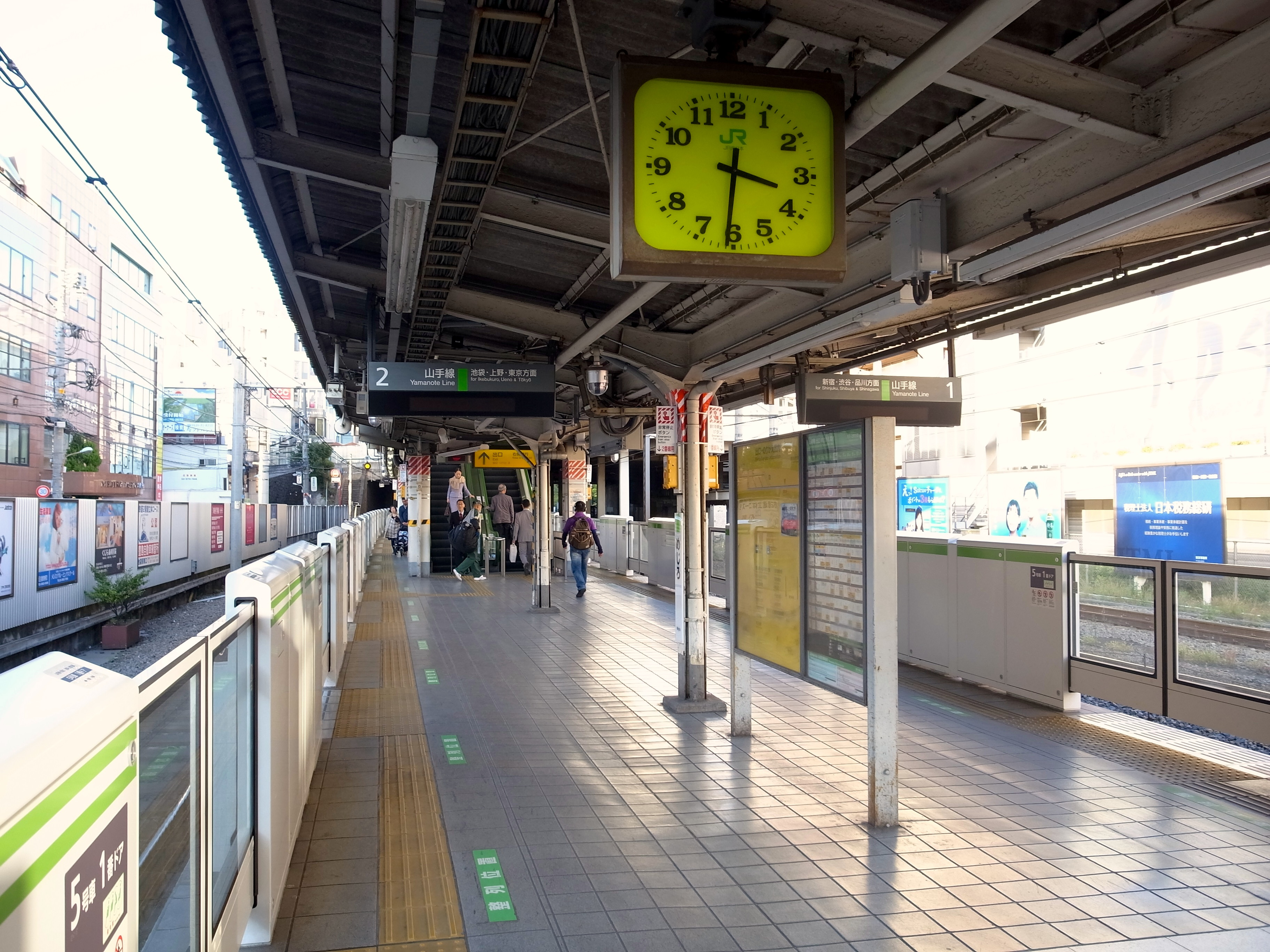
Station platforms, 2014

== History ==
The station opened on 16 March 1885.

Station numbering was introduced in 2016 with Mejiro being assigned station number JY14.

== Passenger statistics ==
In fiscal 2012, the station was used by an average of 37,684 passengers daily (boarding passengers only). The passenger figures for previous years are as shown below.

Fiscal year	Daily average
2000	39,505
2005	39,065
2010	37,568
2011	37,355
2012	37,684

== Surrounding area ==
Mejiro is one of the Yamanote Line's smaller stations, situated between the bustling Ikebukuro and the relatively quiet Takadanobaba.

Mejiro Station has only one exit. The ticket gate emerges onto Mejiro-dori with the co-ed campus of Gakushuin University and the Mejiro Elementary School to the right, and a row of shops and restaurants to the left. Just off Mejiro-dori, a wealthy area becomes residential and quiet. The streets to the west, away from the Yamanote loop, feature a mix of typical apartment buildings built in various decades, as well as some designer houses.

By looking straight ahead from Mejiro Station's main exit, one can see well into the distance toward Ikebukuro's monument-like garbage processing center and the towering Sunshine 60 building.

When inside Mejiro Station, if you stand at the southernmost part, you can see Takadanobaba Station.

== See also ==
- List of railway stations in Japan
- Transportation in Greater Tokyo
