= Hirai Station (Tokyo) =

Railway station in Tokyo, Japan

Coordinates: 35°42′23″N 139°50′33″E

JB24 Hirai Station 平井駅
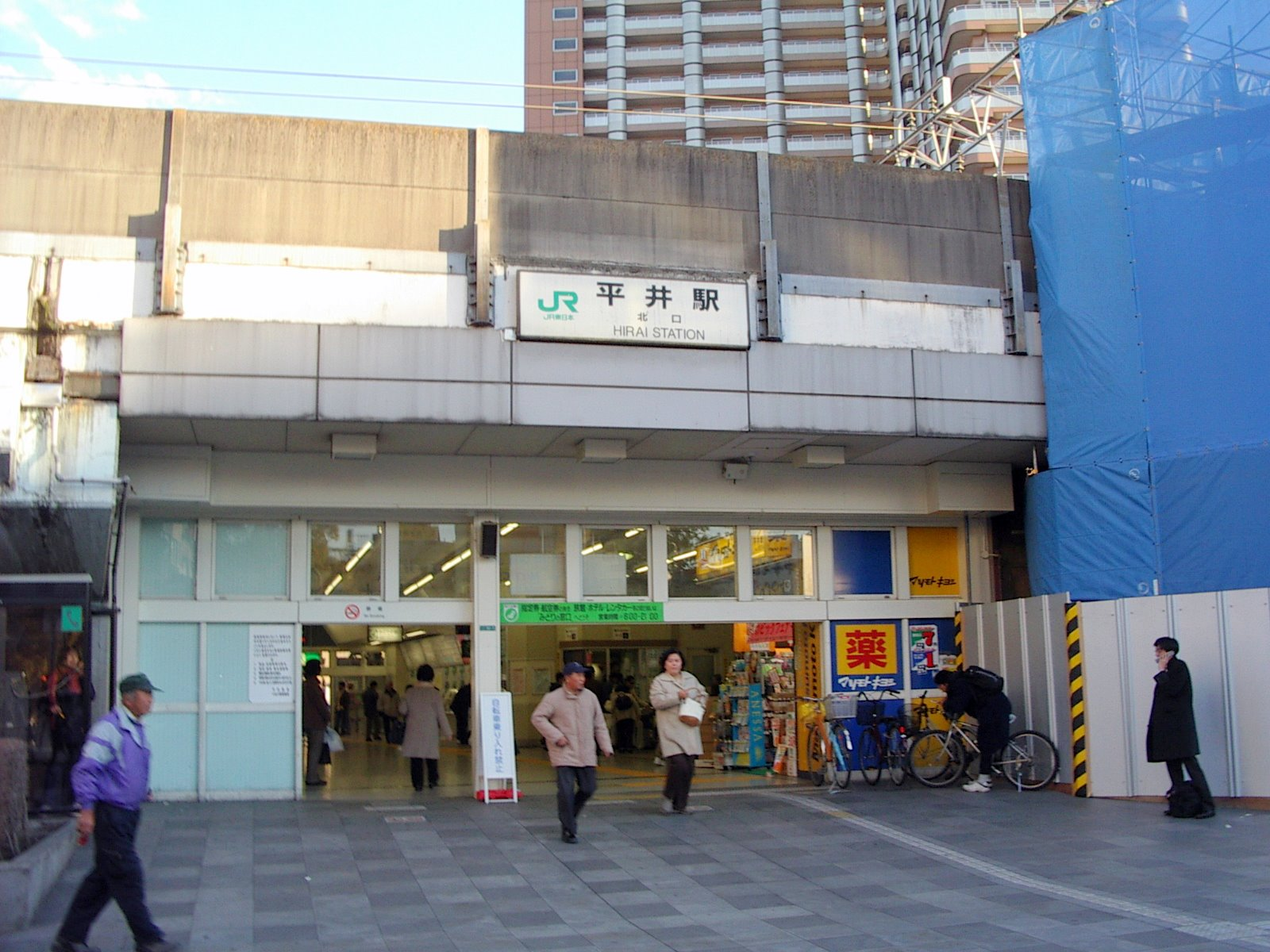
- Hirai Station North entrance, March 2007

General information
- Location: 3 Hirai, Edogawa, Tokyo （東京都江戸川区平井3丁目） Japan
- Operator: JR East
- Line: Chūō-Sōbu Line
- Connections: Bus stop

Other information
- Station code: JB24

History
- Opened: 1899

Passengers
- FY2010: 31,198 daily

Services
Preceding station	JR East	Following station
Kameido JB23 towards Mitaka	Chūō–Sōbu Line	Shin-Koiwa JB25 towards Chiba
Location

Hirai Station (平井駅, Hirai-eki) is a railway station in Edogawa, Tokyo, Japan, operated by the East Japan Railway Company (JR East).

== Lines ==
Hirai Station is served by the Chūō-Sōbu Line.

== Station layout ==
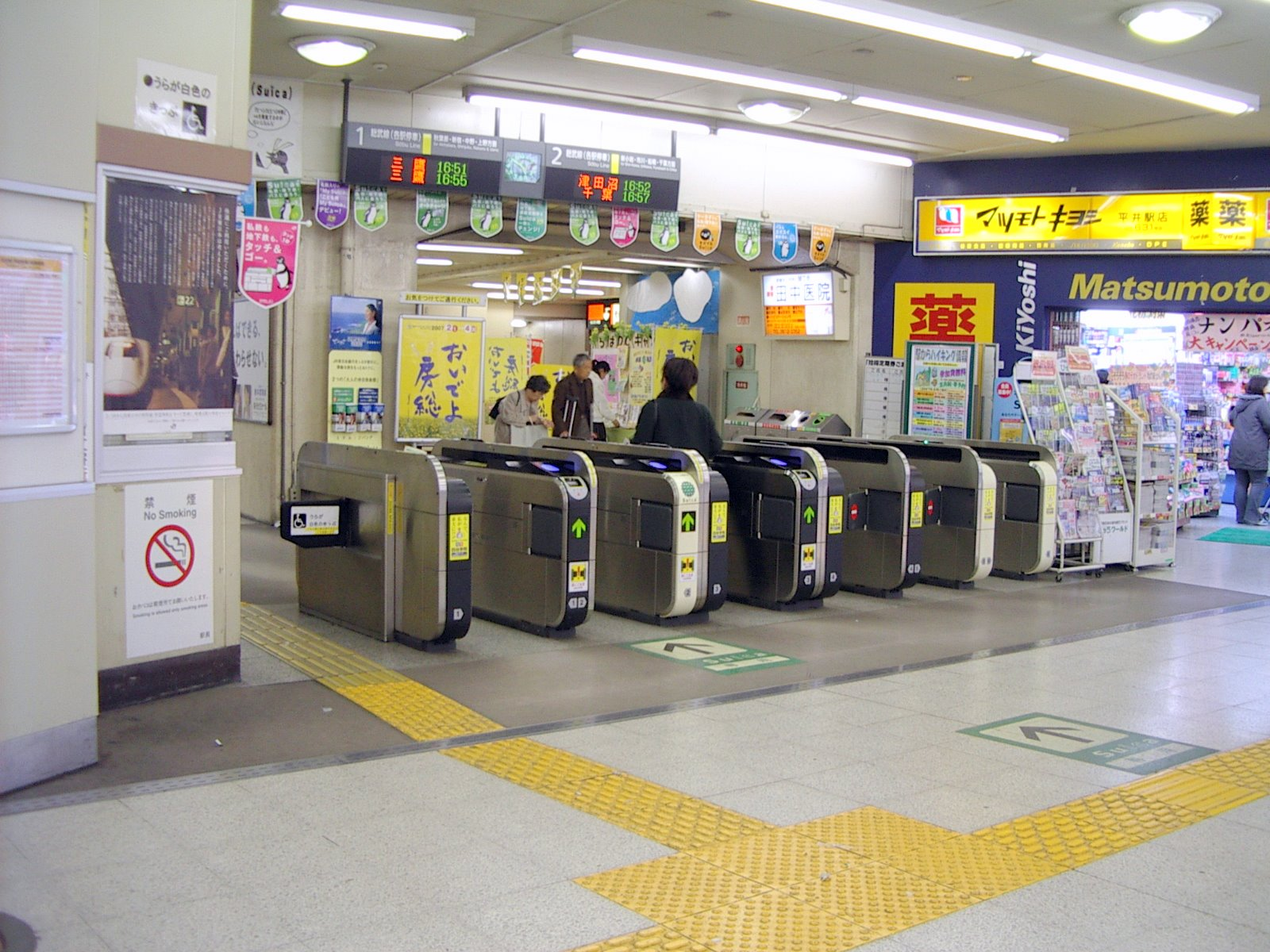
Ticket barriers, March 2007

=== Platforms ===
1	Chūō-Sōbu Line	for Kinshichō, Akihabara, Shinjuku, Nakano, and Mitaka
2	Chūō-Sōbu Line	for Funabashi, Tsudanuma, and Chiba

== History ==
Hirai Station opened on 28 April 1899.

== Passenger statistics ==
In fiscal 2010, the station was used by an average of 31,198 passengers daily.

== Surrounding area ==
- Arakawa River
- Edogawa Boat Racing Circuit
