= Shin-Koiwa Station =

Railway station in Tokyo, Japan

Coordinates: 35°43′0.4116″N 139°51′29.8080″E

JO23 JB25 Shin-Koiwa Station 新小岩駅
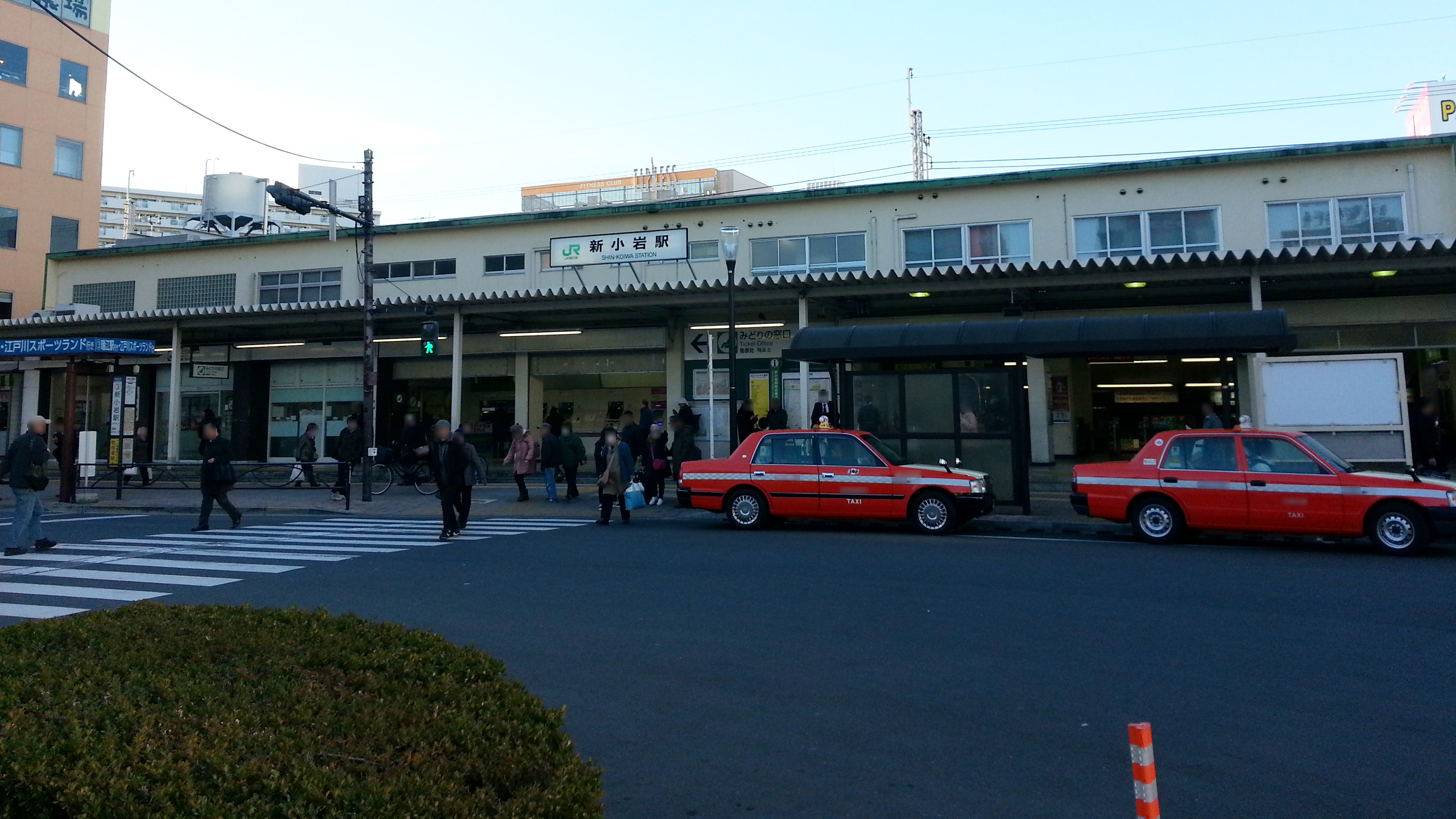
- The south entrance in December 2016

General information
- Location: 1 Shin-Koiwa, Katsushika-ku, Tokyo; Japan
- Operator: JR East
- Lines: Sōbu Line (Rapid); Chūō-Sōbu Line
- Platforms: 2 island platforms
- Tracks: 4

Other information
- Station code: JO23 (Sōbu Line (Rapid)); JB25 (Chūō-Sōbu Line)

History
- Opened: 10 July 1928

Passengers
- FY2013: 72,306 daily

Services
Preceding station	JR East	Following station
Kinshichō JO22 towards Tokyo	Sōbu Line Rapid	Ichikawa JO24 towards Chiba
Hirai JB24 towards Mitaka	Chūō–Sōbu Line	Koiwa JB26 towards Chiba
Location
- Location within Tokyo

Shin-Koiwa Station (新小岩駅, Shin-Koiwa-eki) is a railway station in the Shin-Koiwa neighborhood, in Katsushika, Tokyo, Japan, operated by East Japan Railway Company (JR East).

== Lines ==
Shin-Koiwa Station is served by the Sōbu Line (Rapid) and the Chūō-Sōbu Line.

== Station layout ==
The station consists of two island platforms serving four tracks. The station has a "Midori no Madoguchi" staffed ticket office and also a "View Plaza" travel agent.

=== Platforms ===
1	Chūō-Sōbu Line	for Akihabara and Shinjuku
2	Chūō-Sōbu Line	for Nishi-Funabashi and Chiba
3	Sōbu Line (Rapid)	for Kinshichō, Tokyo; Yokosuka Line for Yokohama
4	Sōbu Line (Rapid)	for Funabashi and Chiba

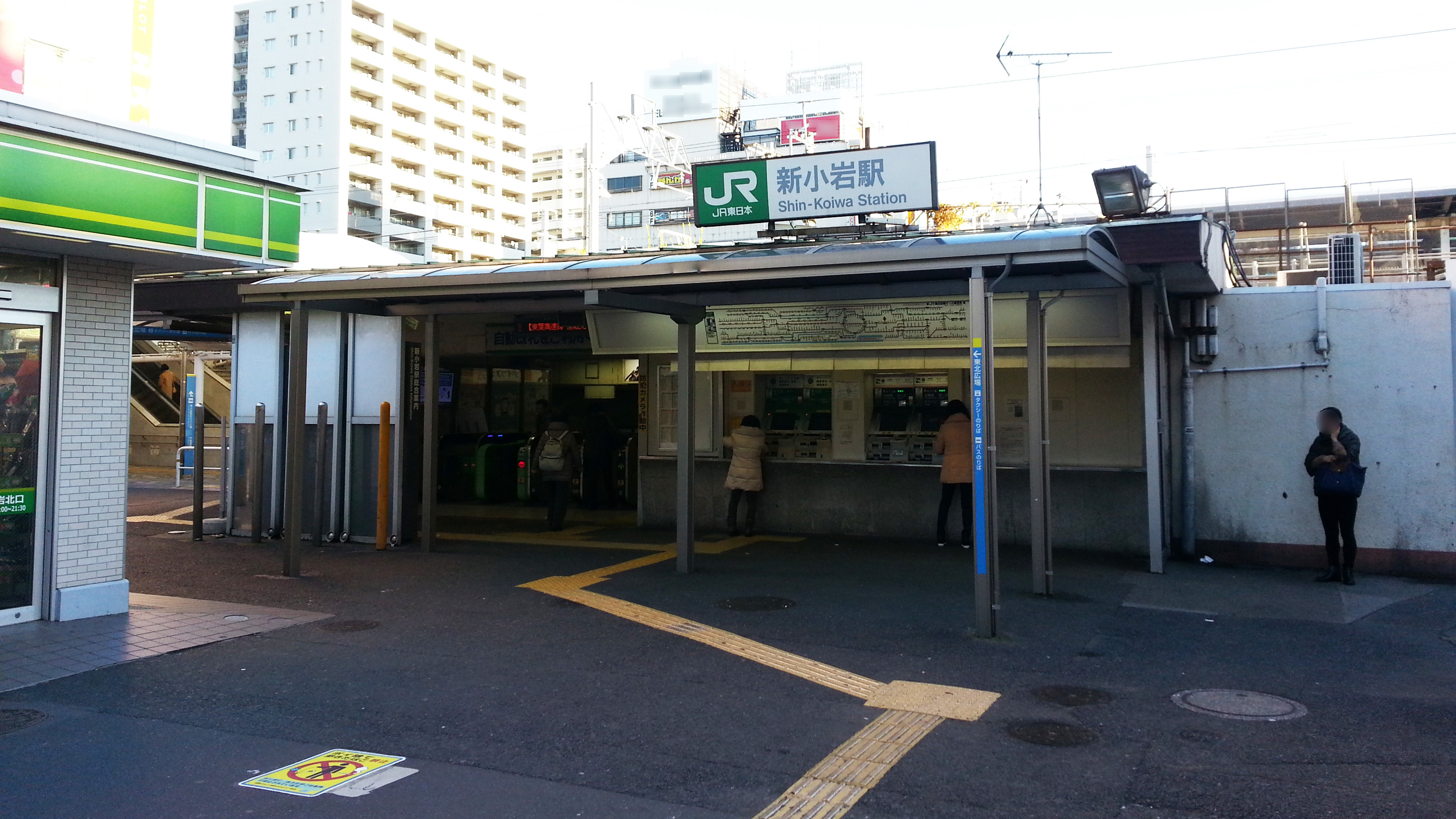
The north entrance in December 2016

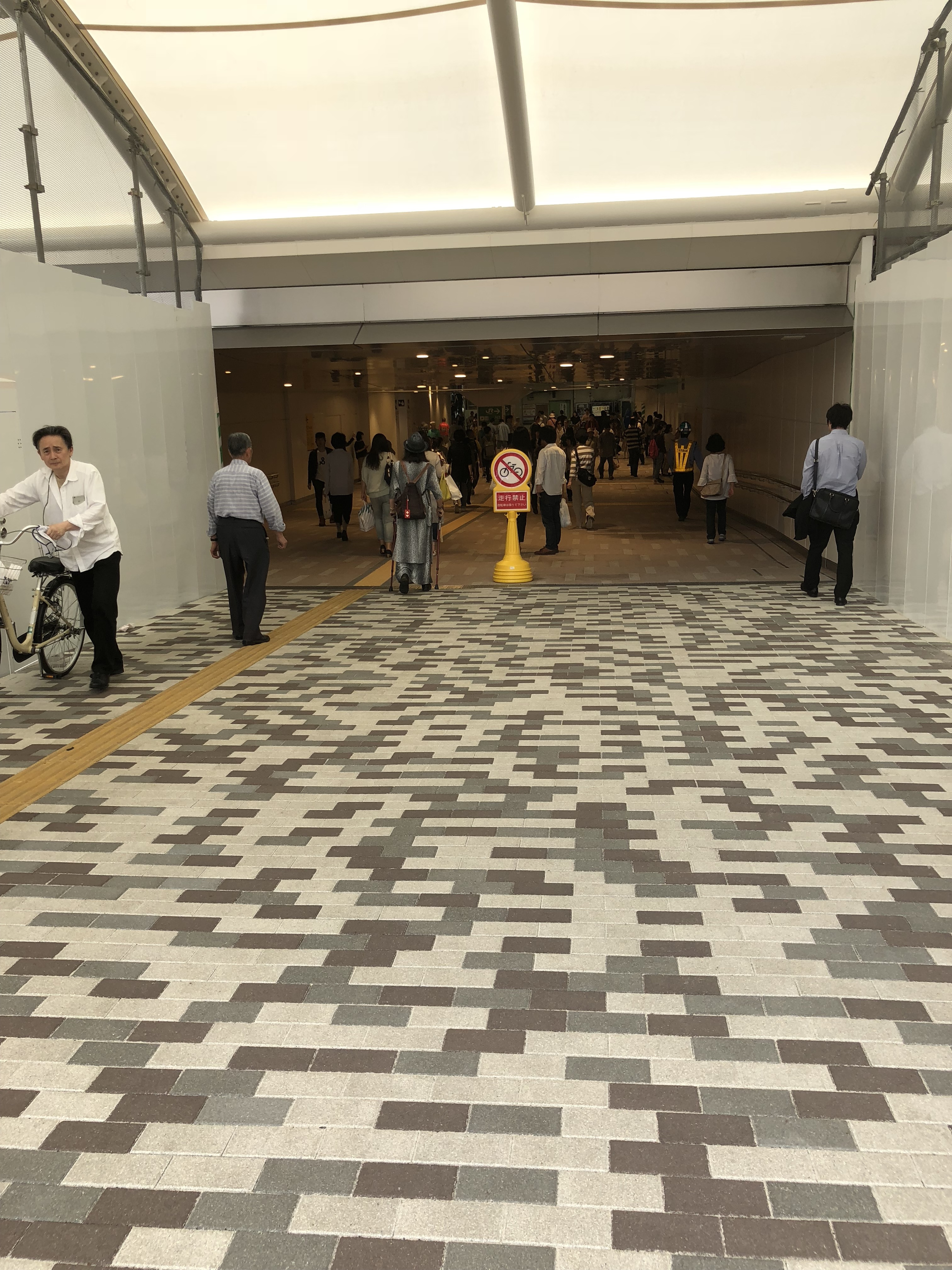
The new North Entrance of Shin-Koiwa Station on the Sobu Line in Tokyo, opened on 24 June 2018

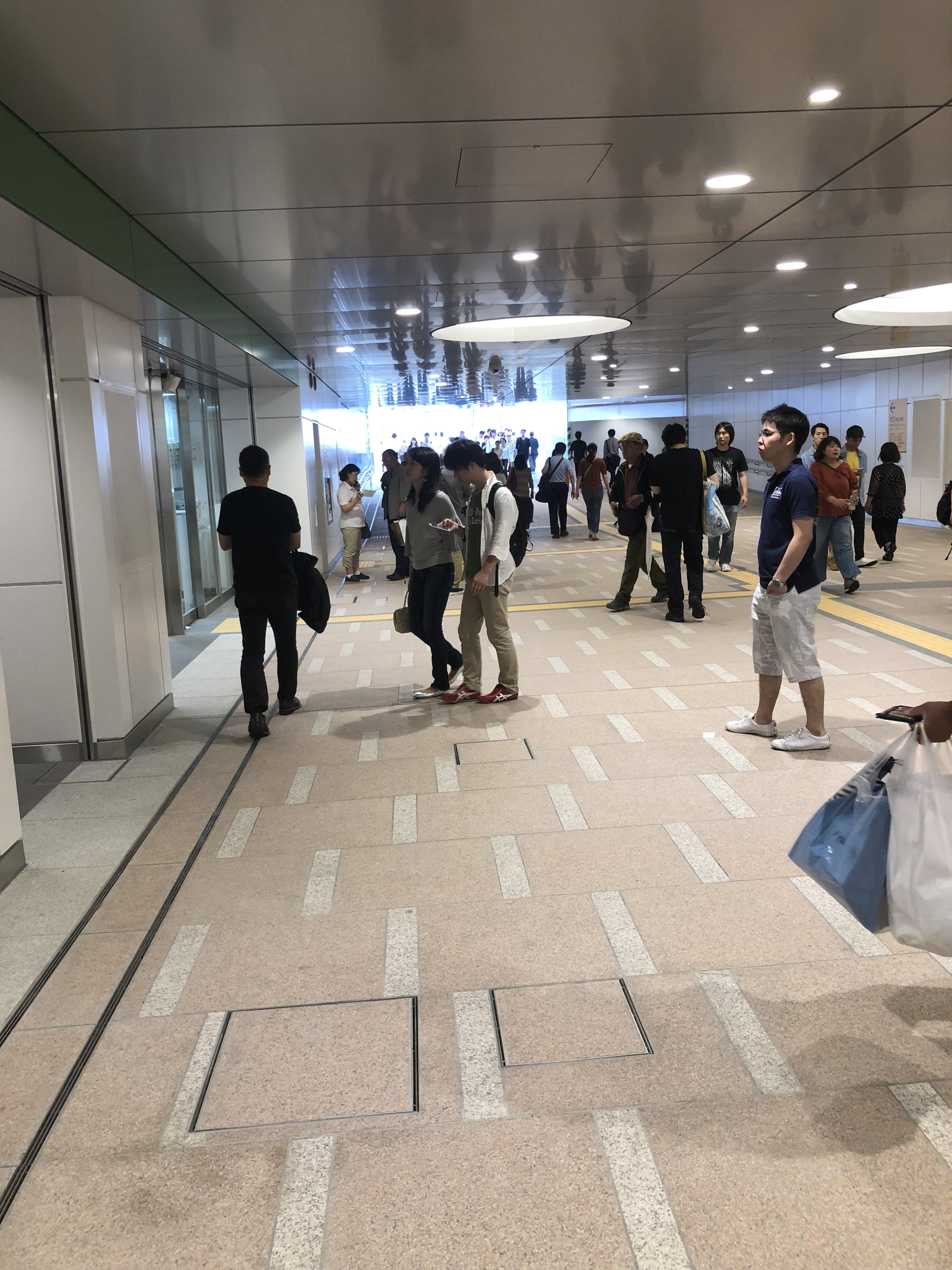
The new north–south corridor of Shin-Koiwa Station on the Sobu Line in Tokyo, opened on 24 June 2018 allows people to walk from the north entrance to the south entrance without walking around the station building. This view is towards the north exit.

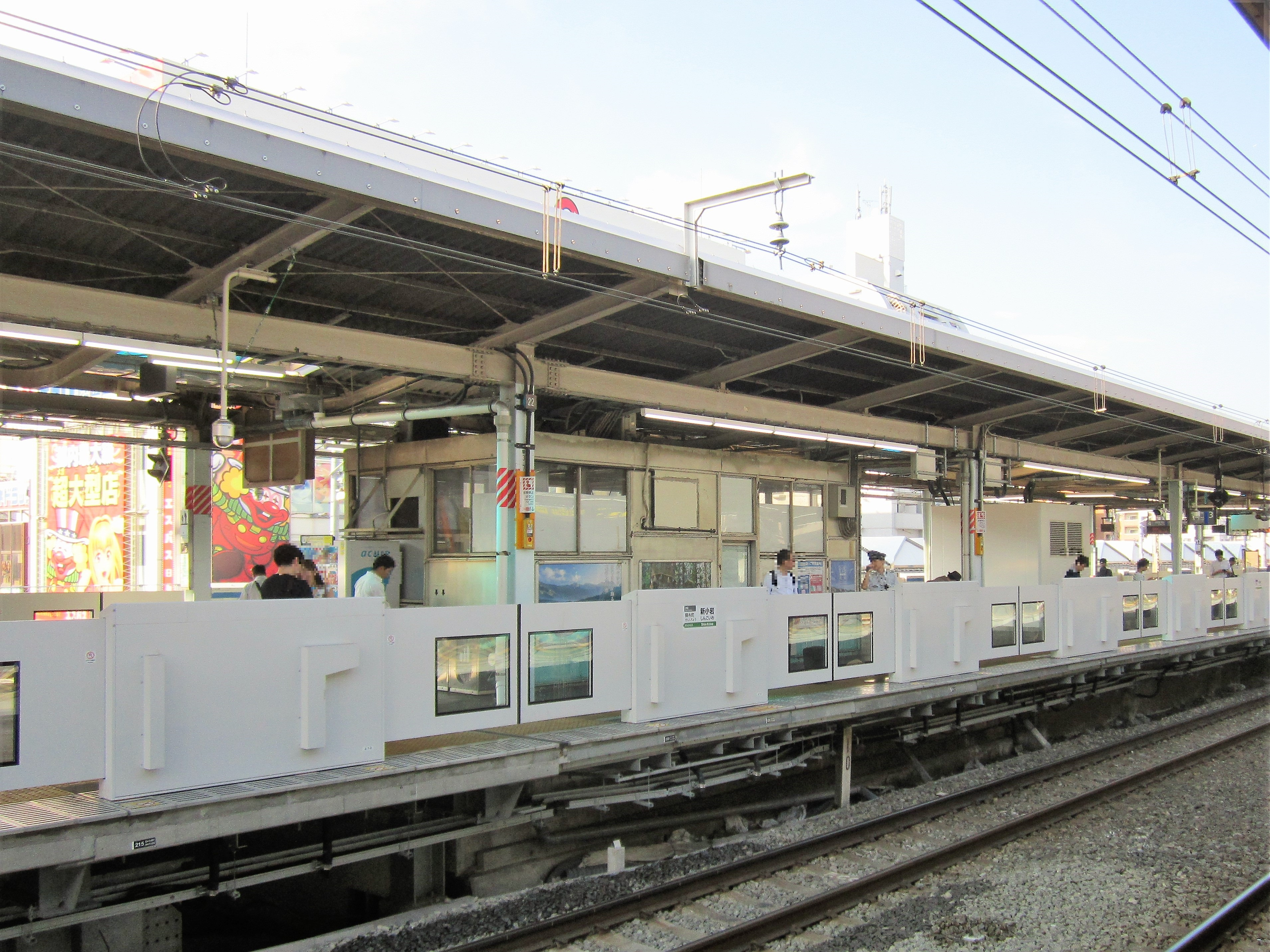
Platforms of Shin-Koiwa after platform edge doors were added

== History ==
Shin-Koiwa Station opened on 10 July 1928. With the privatization of Japanese National Railways (JNR) on 1 April 1987, the station came under the control of JR East.

== Passenger statistics ==
In fiscal 2013, the station was used by an average of 72,306 passengers daily (boarding passengers only), making it the 59th-busiest station operated by JR East. The daily average passenger figures (boarding passengers only) in previous years are as shown below.

Fiscal year	Daily average
2000	67,697
2005	69,849
2010	71,121
2011	70,435
2012	70,880
2013	72,306

In the 2015 data available from Japan's Ministry of Land, Infrastructure, Transport and Tourism, Shin Koiwa → Kinshichō was one of the train segments among Tokyo's most crowded train lines during rush hour.

== Accidents ==
JR East considered installing platform-edge doors at Shin-Koiwa as early as 2013 due to the large number of passenger accidents and suicides occurring at the station. Between July 2011 and June 2013, 13 incidents occurred in which passengers were hit by trains at this station. Katsushika Ward made an official request to JR East to install platform-edge doors at the station in July 2012.

On 27 June 2013, at around 14:40, a man in his thirties jumped in front of a 12-car Narita Express Yokohama to Narita Airport service passing non-stop through the station. The man died and his body hit a woman standing on the platform, injuring her.

In 2018, automatic platform gates were installed on the Sōbu Rapid Line platforms of the station. As the line's trains are 300 m (980 ft) long, the set of platform gates broke the world record for the longest platform doors at East Tsim Sha Tsui station in Hong Kong.

== See also ==
- List of railway stations in Japan
