= Kasai Station =

Metro station in Tokyo, Japan

Coordinates: 35°39′49″N 139°52′21″E

Kasai Station 葛西駅

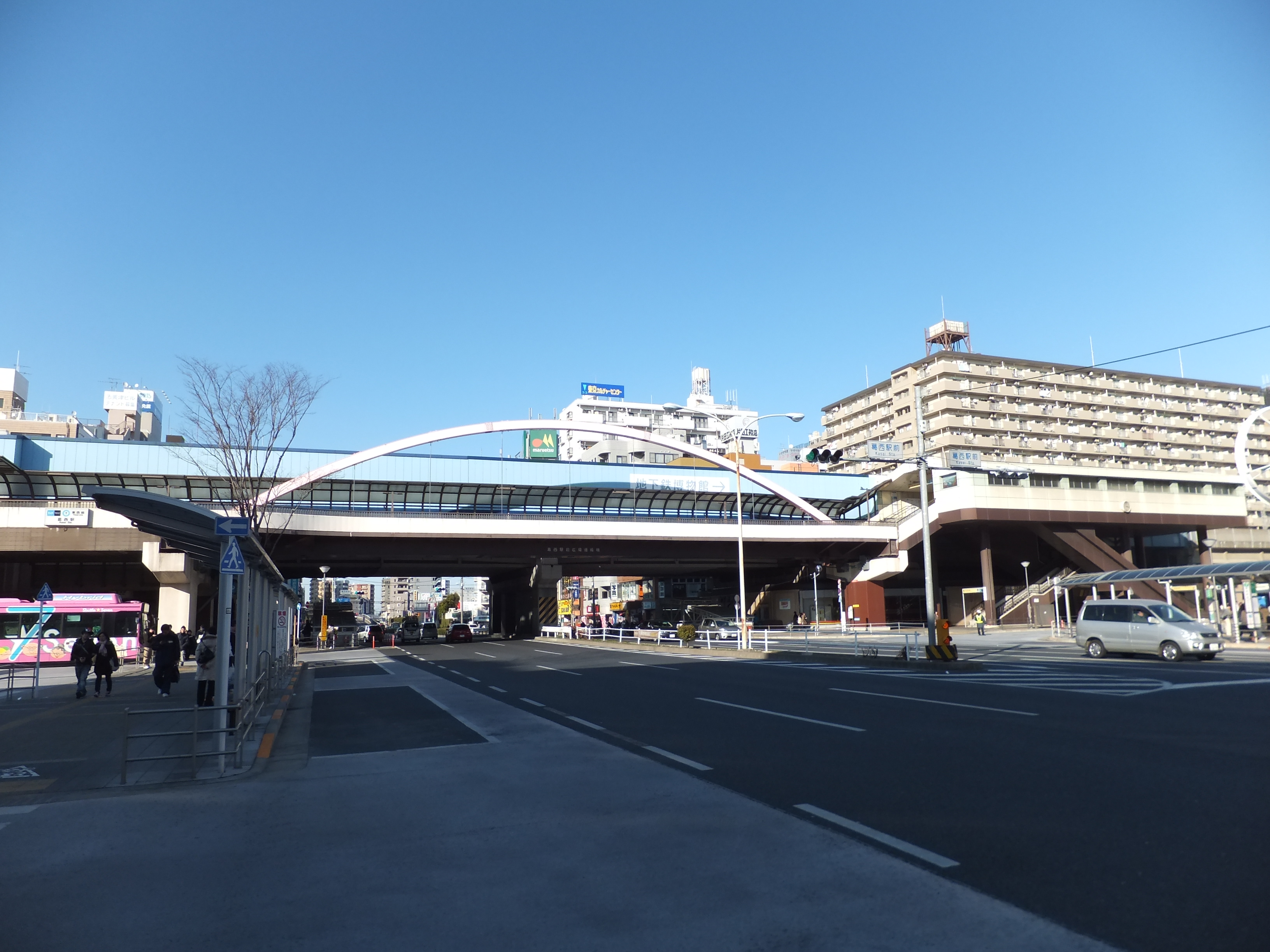
- Kasai Station (February 2012)

General information
- Location: 5-43-11 Naka-Kasai, Edogawa-ku, Tokyo; Japan
- Operator: Tokyo Metro
- Line: Tōzai Line
- Platforms: 2 side platforms
- Tracks: 2

Construction
- Structure type: Elevated

Other information
- Station code: T-17

History
- Opened: 29 March 1969; 57 years ago

Passengers
- 2021: 81,519 (Daily

Services
Preceding station	Tokyo Metro	Following station
Nishi-kasai towards Nakano	Tōzai Line Commuter Rapid Local	Urayasu towards Nishi-Funabashi
Location
- Location within Tokyo wards area Location within Tokyo Keiyo area Location within Kanto Area Location within Japan

Kasai Station (葛西駅, Kasai-eki) is a railway station on the Tokyo Metro Tozai Line in Edogawa, Tokyo, Japan, operated by the Tokyo subway operator Tokyo Metro.

== Lines ==
Kasai Station is served by the Tokyo Metro Tozai Line, and is numbered T-17.

== Station layout ==
The station consists of two elevated side platforms. The station also has two center express tracks used for rapid service trains to bypass local trains at this station.

=== Platforms ===
1	Tōzai Line	for Nishi-Funabashi; Chuo-Sobu Line for Tsudanuma; Toyo Rapid Railway Line for Tōyō-Katsutadai
2	Tōzai Line	for Tōyōchō, Ōtemachi, and Nakano; Chuo-Sobu Line for Mitaka

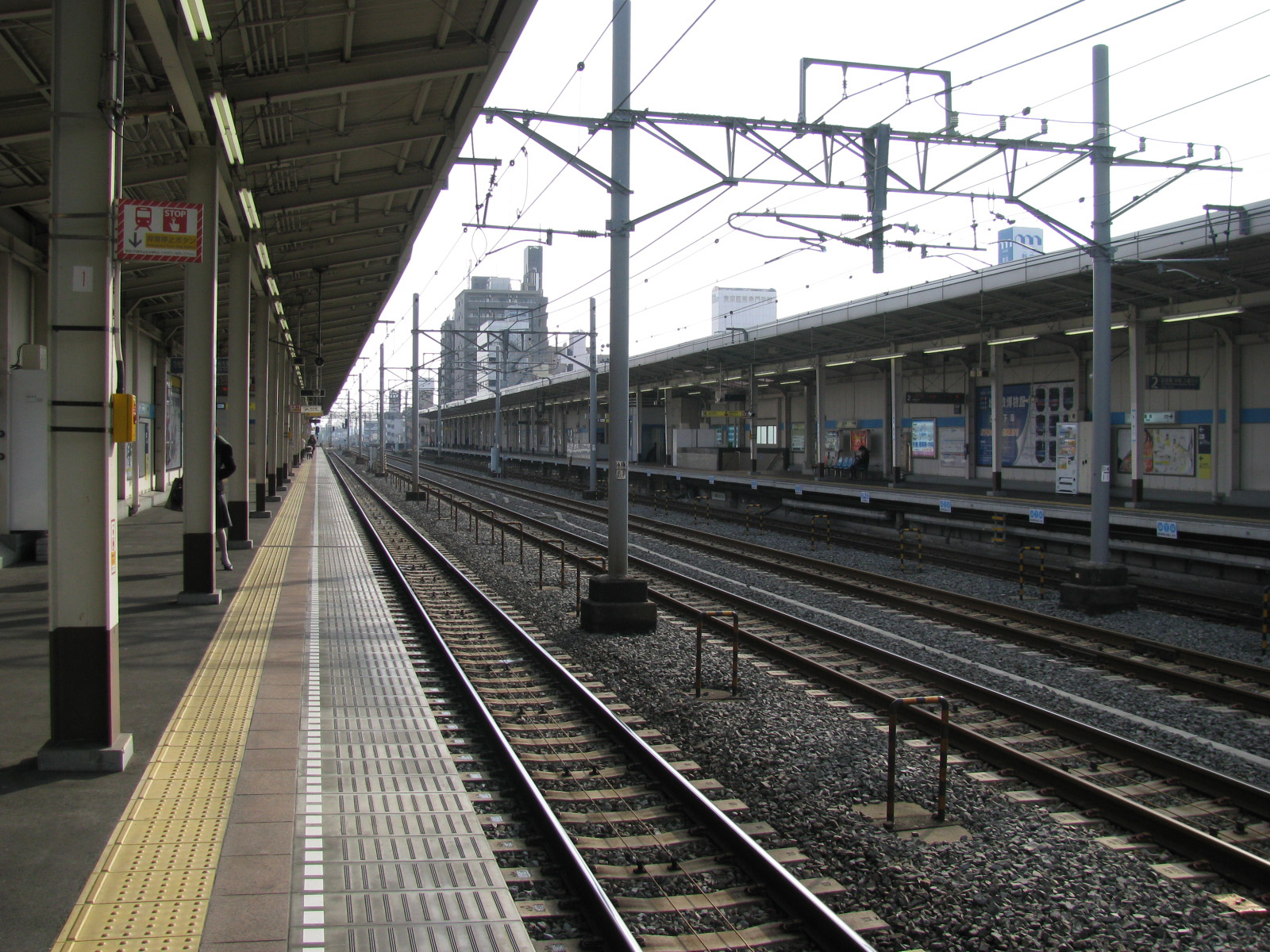
Platforms

== History ==
The station opened on 29 March 1969.

The station facilities were inherited by Tokyo Metro after the privatization of the Teito Rapid Transit Authority (TRTA) in 2004.

== Surrounding area ==
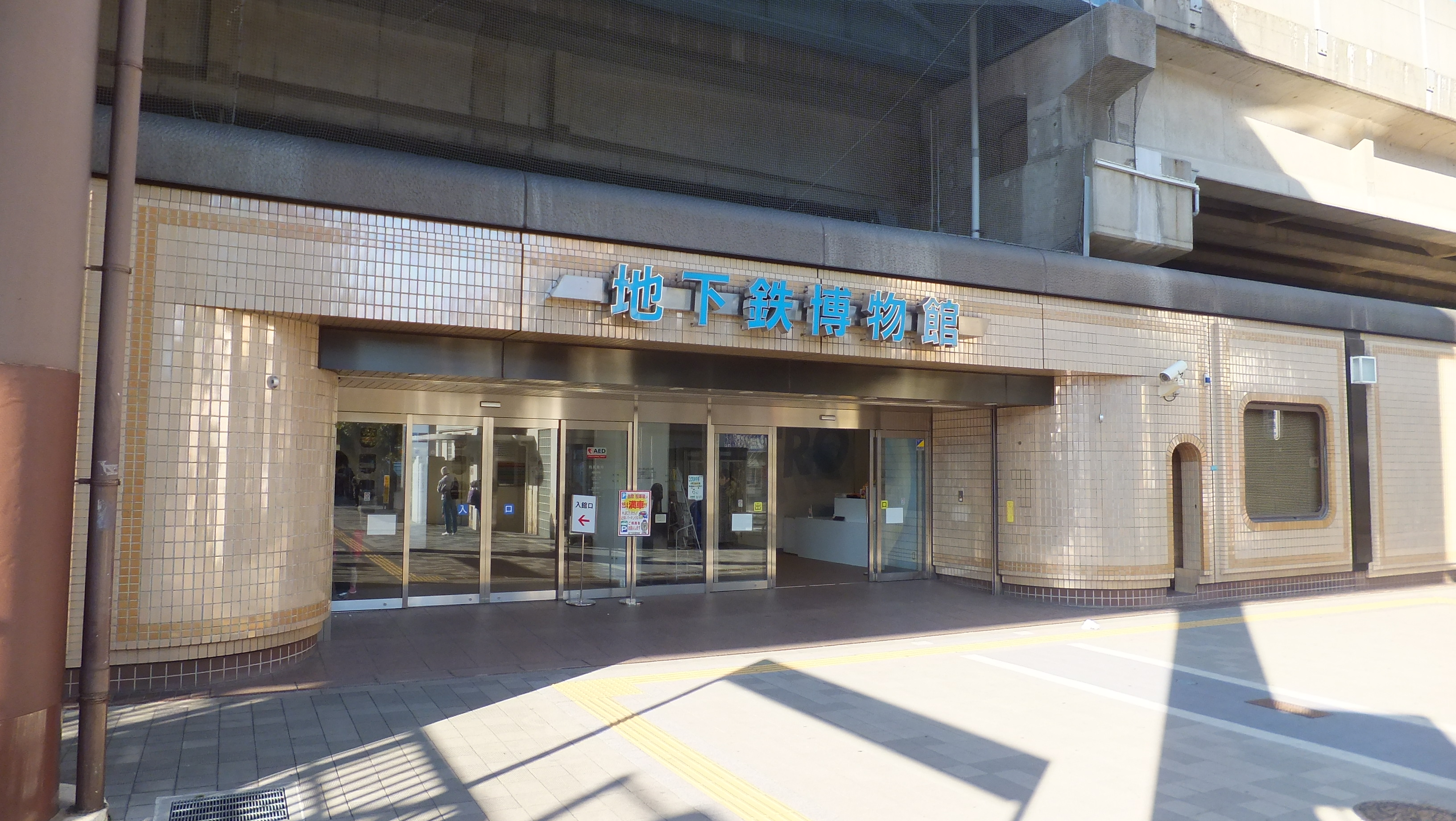
Tokyo Metro Museum entrance

The station has the world's largest fully automated parking lot for bicycles where about 9,400 bicycles are automatically parked in its 15 metre deep basement. Each of the automatic elevators at the parking lot can handle up to 180-190 and it takes just 23 seconds to retrieve the bicycle.

The Tokyo Metro Museum is also located beneath the platforms of Kasai station and was opened in 1986.
