= Morishita Station (Tokyo) =

Metro station in Tokyo, Japan

Coordinates: 35.688007°N 139.798235°E

Morishita Station 森下駅

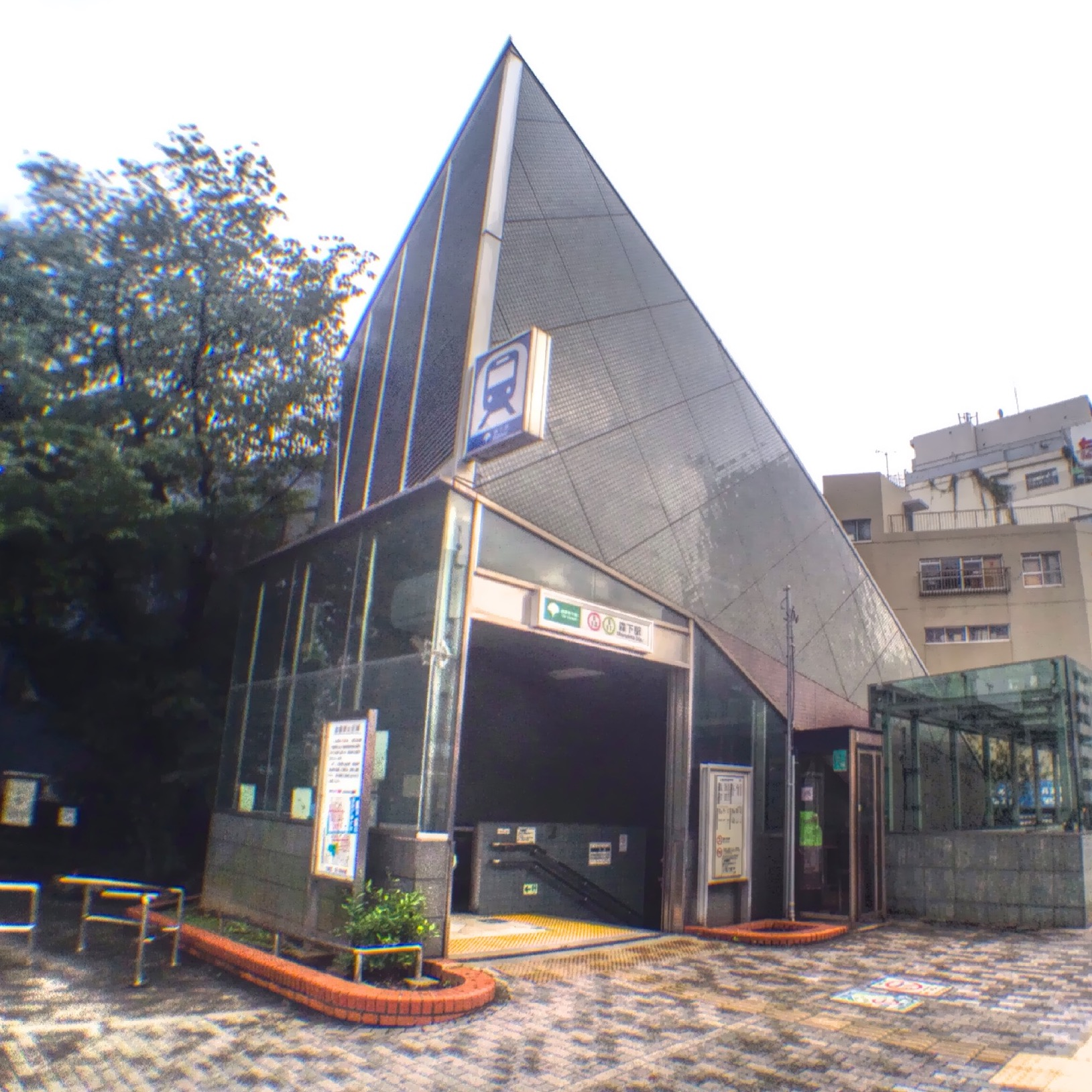
- A5 entrance to Morishita Station, 2017

General information
- Location: Morishita 1-13-10 (Shinjuku Line); Morishita 2-17-17 (Oedo Line); Kōtō City, Tokyo （東京都江東区森下1-13-10 (Shinjuku Line) 東京都江東区森下2-17-17 (Ōedo Line)） Japan
- Operator: Toei Subway
- Lines: Shinjuku Line; Ōedo Line
- Platforms: 2 island platforms (1 for each line)
- Tracks: 4 (2 for each line)

Construction
- Structure type: Underground

Other information
- Station code: S-11 (Shinjuku Line); E-13 (Ōedo Line)

History
- Opened: 21 December 1978; 47 years ago

Passengers
- 121,571 daily

Services
Preceding station	Toei Subway	Following station
Bakuro-yokoyama towards Shinjuku	Shinjuku Line Express	Ojima towards Motoyawata
Hamacho towards Shinjuku	Shinjuku Line Local	Kikukawa towards Motoyawata
Ryogoku towards Tochōmae	Ōedo Line	Kiyosumi-shirakawa towards Hikarigaoka
Location
- Location within Special wards of Tokyo Location within Tokyo Bay and Bōsō Peninsula Location within Tokyo Location within Japan

Morishita Station (森下駅, Morishita-eki) is a subway station in Kōtō, Tokyo, Japan, operated by Toei Subway. Its station numbers are S-11 (Shinjuku Line) and E-13 (Ōedo Line).

== Lines ==
Morishita Station is served by the following two lines.

- Toei Shinjuku Line
- Toei Ōedo Line

== Platforms ==
Morishita Station consists of two island platforms (one for each line), each served by two tracks.

1	Shinjuku Line	for Bakuro-yokoyama, Kudanshita, and Shinjuku; Keio Line for Sasazuka and Hashimoto
2	Shinjuku Line	for Motoyawata
3	Ōedo Line	for Ryogoku and Iidabashi
4	Ōedo Line	for Daimon and Roppongi

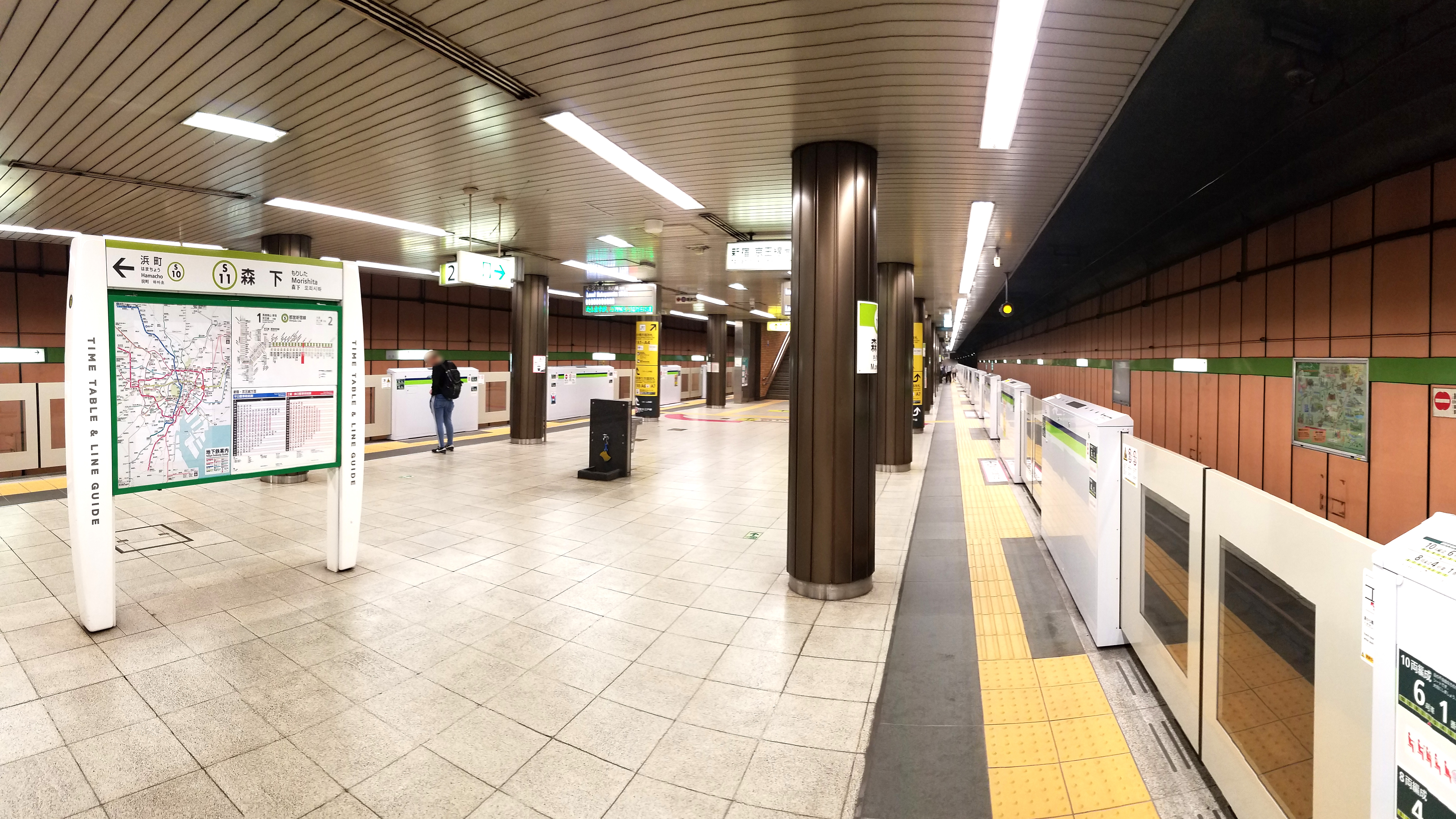
Shinjuku Line platforms

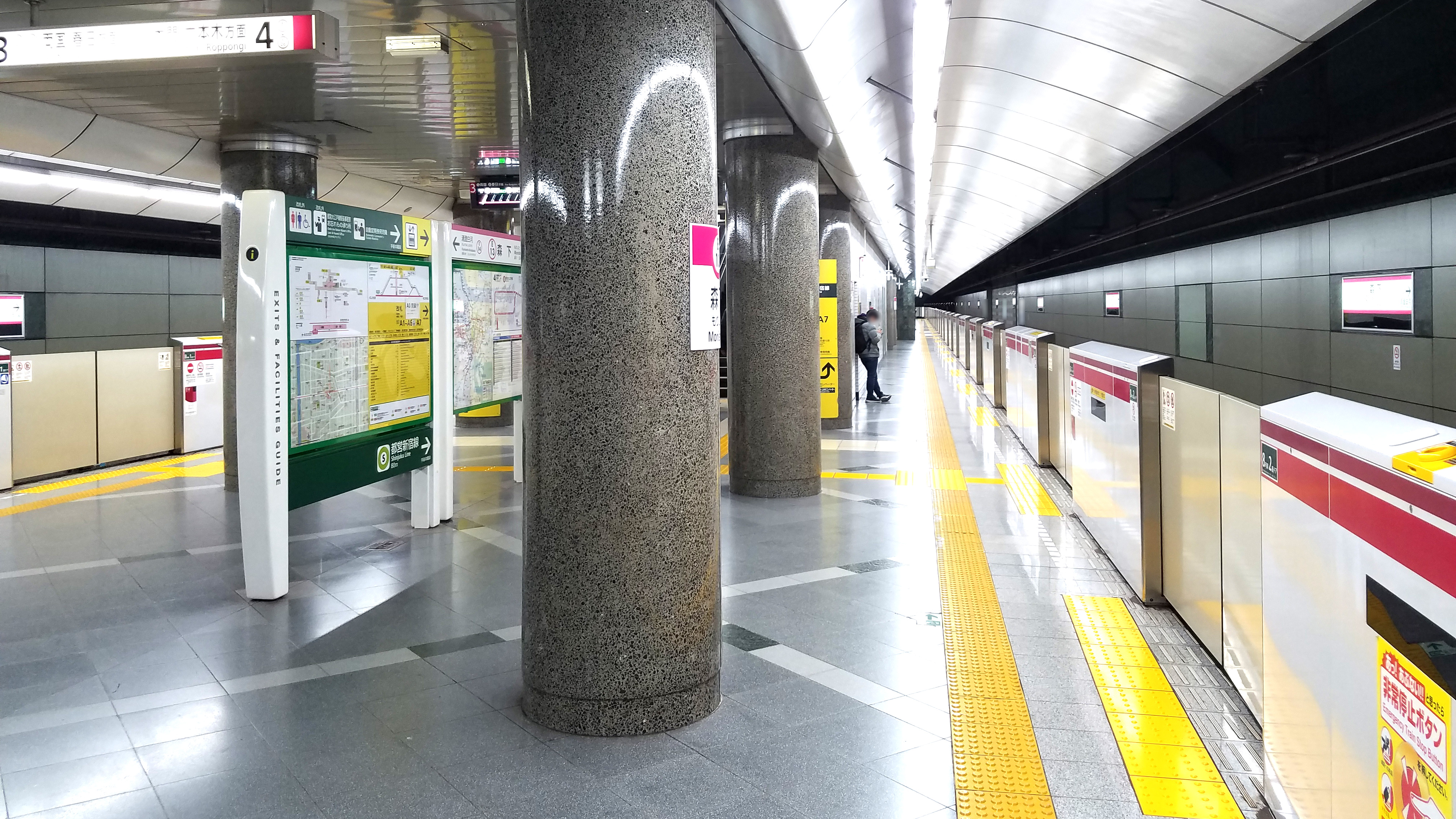
Oedo Line platforms

== History ==
The station opened on December 21, 1978; service on the Ōedo Line began on December 12, 2000.

== Surrounding area ==
The station is located underneath the intersection of Tokyo Metropolitan Routes 50 (Shin-Ōhashi-dōri) and 463 (Kiyosumi-dōri). The area is typically shitamachi, with a mix of mid-rise office buildings, apartment buildings, and homes. Being close to Ryōgoku, many sumōbeya are located in the vicinity.

== Connecting bus service ==
Toei Bus: Morishita-Ekimae

- Mon 33: for Kameido Station
- Kyūkō 06: for National Museum of Emerging Science and Innovation
- Kin 11: for Kinshichō Station, Shinozaki Station
