= Keio 9000 series =

Japanese train type

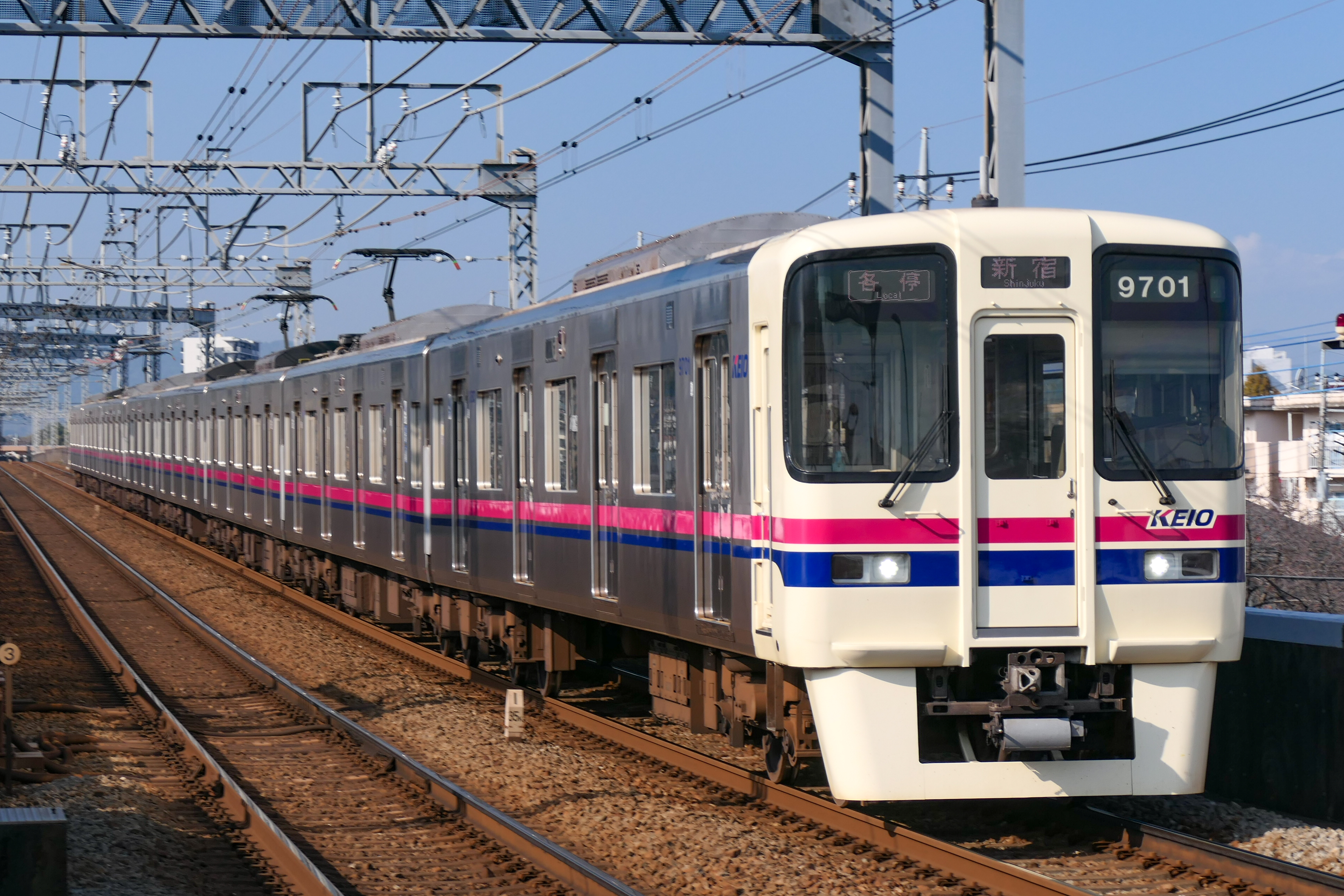
- 8-car set 9701 in November 2021
- In service: 2001–present
- Manufacturers: Nippon Sharyo, Tokyu Car Corporation
- Replaced: 6000 series
- Constructed: 2000–2009
- Entered service: 24 January 2001
- Refurbished: 2025–
- Number built: 264 vehicles (28 sets)
- Number in service: 264 vehicles (28 sets)
- Formation: 8/10 cars per trainset
- Fleet numbers: 9701–9708 (8-car sets); 9730–9749 (10-car sets)
- Capacity: 141 (end cars), 152 (intermediate cars)
- Operator: Keio Corporation
- Depots: Takahatafudō and Wakabadai
- Lines served: Keio Line; Keio Sagamihara Line; Keio Takao Line; Toei Shinjuku Line

Specifications
- Car body construction: Stainless steel
- Car length: 20 m (65 ft 7 in)
- Width: 2,845 mm (9 ft 4 in)
- Height: 4,100 mm (13 ft 5 in)
- Doors: 4 pairs per side
- Maximum speed: 110 km/h (68 mph) on Keio Corporation lines, 75 km/h (47 mph) on Toei Shinjuku Line
- Traction system: Hitachi 2-level VVVF (IGBT switching device)
- Traction motors: Hitachi 3-phase squirrel-cage induction motor
- Power output: 170 kW (228 hp) x4 per motored car
- Acceleration: 2.5 km/(h⋅s) (1.6 mph/s) (Keio Line); 3.3 km/(h⋅s) (2.1 mph/s) (Toei Shinjuku Line)
- Deceleration: 4.0 km/(h⋅s) (2.5 mph/s); 4.5 km/(h⋅s) (2.8 mph/s) (emergency)
- Electric systems: 1,500 V DC overhead line
- Current collection: Pantograph
- Braking system: Electronically controlled pneumatic brakes with regenerative braking
- Safety systems: ATC, Digital-ATC
- Multiple working: 7000 series, 6000 series
- Track gauge: 1,372 mm (4 ft 6 in)

The Keio 9000 series (京王9000系) is an electric multiple unit (EMU) train type in Japan, operated by the private railway operator Keio Corporation since 2001 on the Keio Line and its branches in Tokyo and Kanagawa Prefecture.

== Variants ==
- 9000 series: original 8-car sets (9701–9708)
- 9030 series: 10-car sets (9730–9749) for use on Toei Shinjuku Line inter-running services from 2006
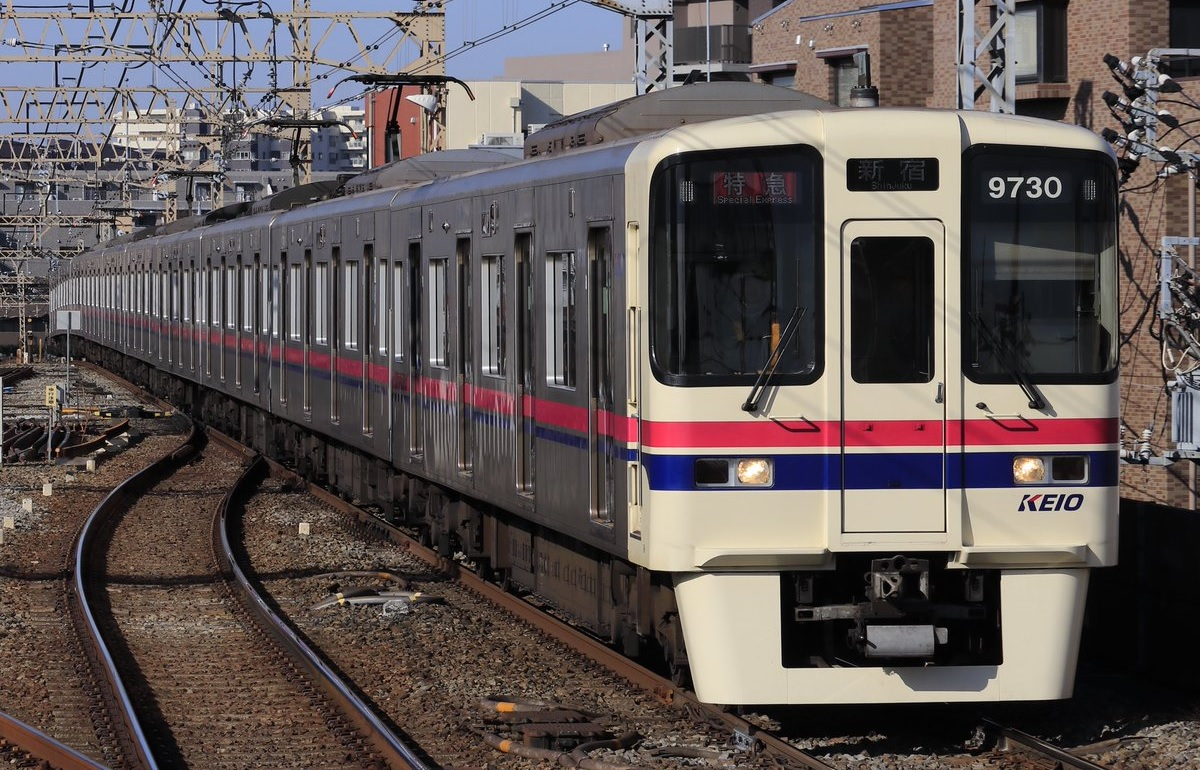
10-car set 9730

== Operations ==
=== 9000 series ===
The 9000 series 8-car sets are used mainly on the Keio Line, the Takao Line, and the Sagamihara Line. These sets are mainly used on Local services during daytime. They are also used on 10-car Special Express and Rapid trains. Sets are coupled to 2-car Keio 7000 series sets to form 10-car trains.

=== 9030 series ===
The 9030 series 10-car sets are used primarily on inter-running services to and from the Toei Shinjuku Line.

== Design ==
The front end design is based on the design of the Keio 5000 series. The body is made of stainless steel. While most of the sets were built at Nippon Sharyo, some were built at Tokyu Car Corporation. The front portion is made of steel painted ivory white.

The 9030 series sets differ from the earlier 8-car sets in having UV-cutting glass for the wide windows, eliminating the need for roller blinds, and having full-colour LED destination indicator panels.

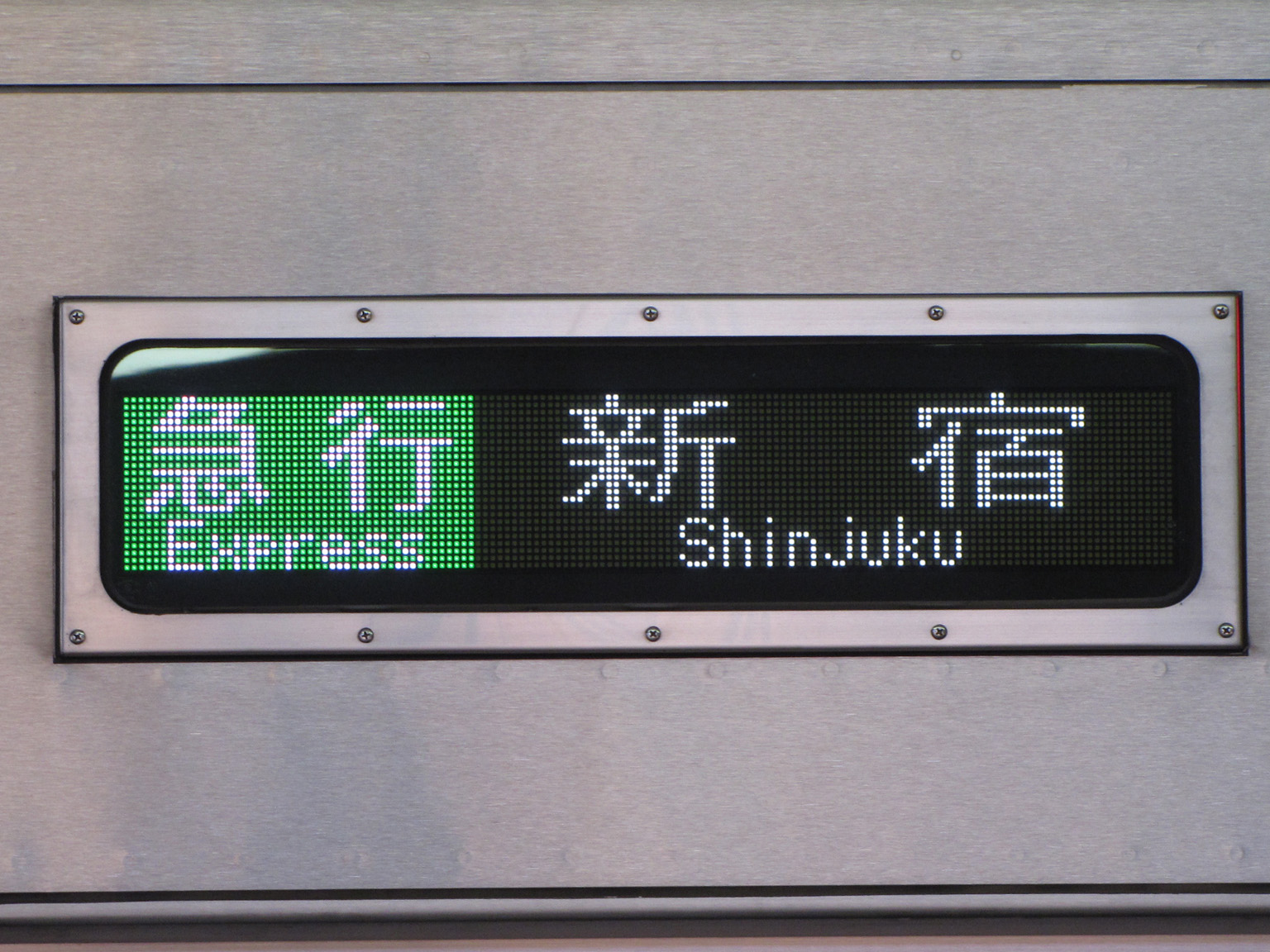
Exterior destination panel

== Formations ==
As of 1 April 2013, the fleet consists of eight 8-car 9000 series sets and twenty 10-car 9030 series sets.

=== 8-car 9000 series ===
The 8-car 9000 series sets (9701 to 9708) are formed as shown below, with four motored (M) cars and four non-powered trailer (T) cars, and with car 1 at the western end.

Car No.	1	2	3	4	5	6	7	8
Designation	Tc2	M2	M1	T2	T1	M2	M1	Tc1
Numbering	9750	9150	9100	9550	9500	9050	9000	9700

- Cars 3, 6, and 7 each have one single-arm pantograph.
- Cars 2 and 7 have a wheelchair space.

=== 10-car 9030 series ===
The 10-car 9030 series sets (9730 to 9749) are formed as shown below, with five motored (M) cars and five non-powered trailer (T) cars, and with car 1 at the western end.

Car No.	1	2	3	4	5	6	7	8	9	10
Designation	Tc2	M2	M1	T2	T2	M1	T1	M2	M1	Tc1
Numbering	9750	9250	9200	9650	9550	9100	9500	9050	9000	9700

- Cars 2, 3, 6, 8, and 9 each have one single-arm pantograph.
- Cars 2, 5, 7, and 9 have a wheelchair space.

== Interior ==
Passenger accommodation consists of longitudinal bench seating throughout. Priority seats are provided at the end of each car.

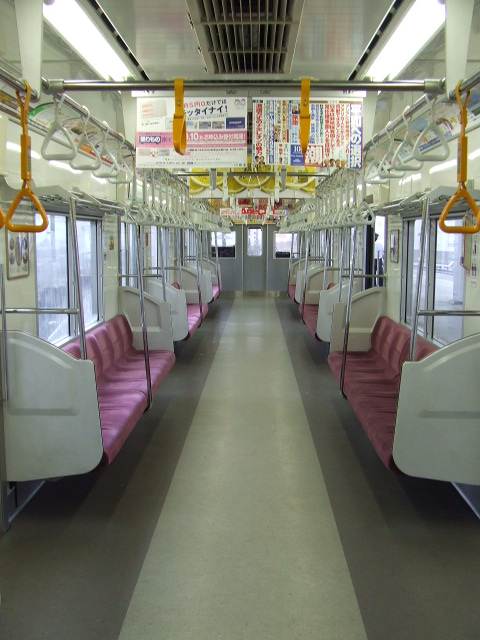
9000 series interior

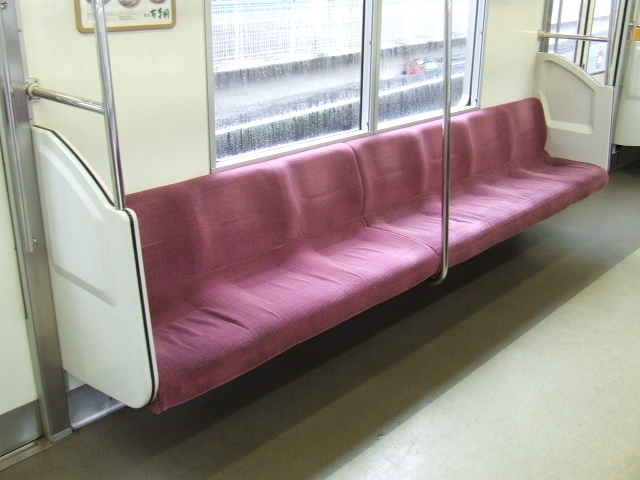
9000 series seating

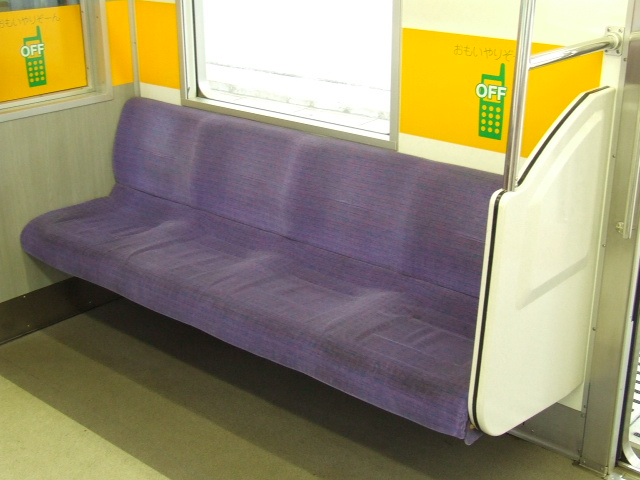
Priority seats of a 9000 series set

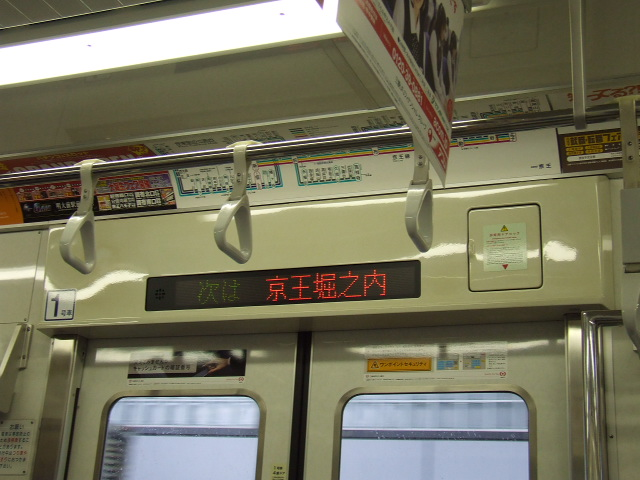
9000 series LED passenger information display

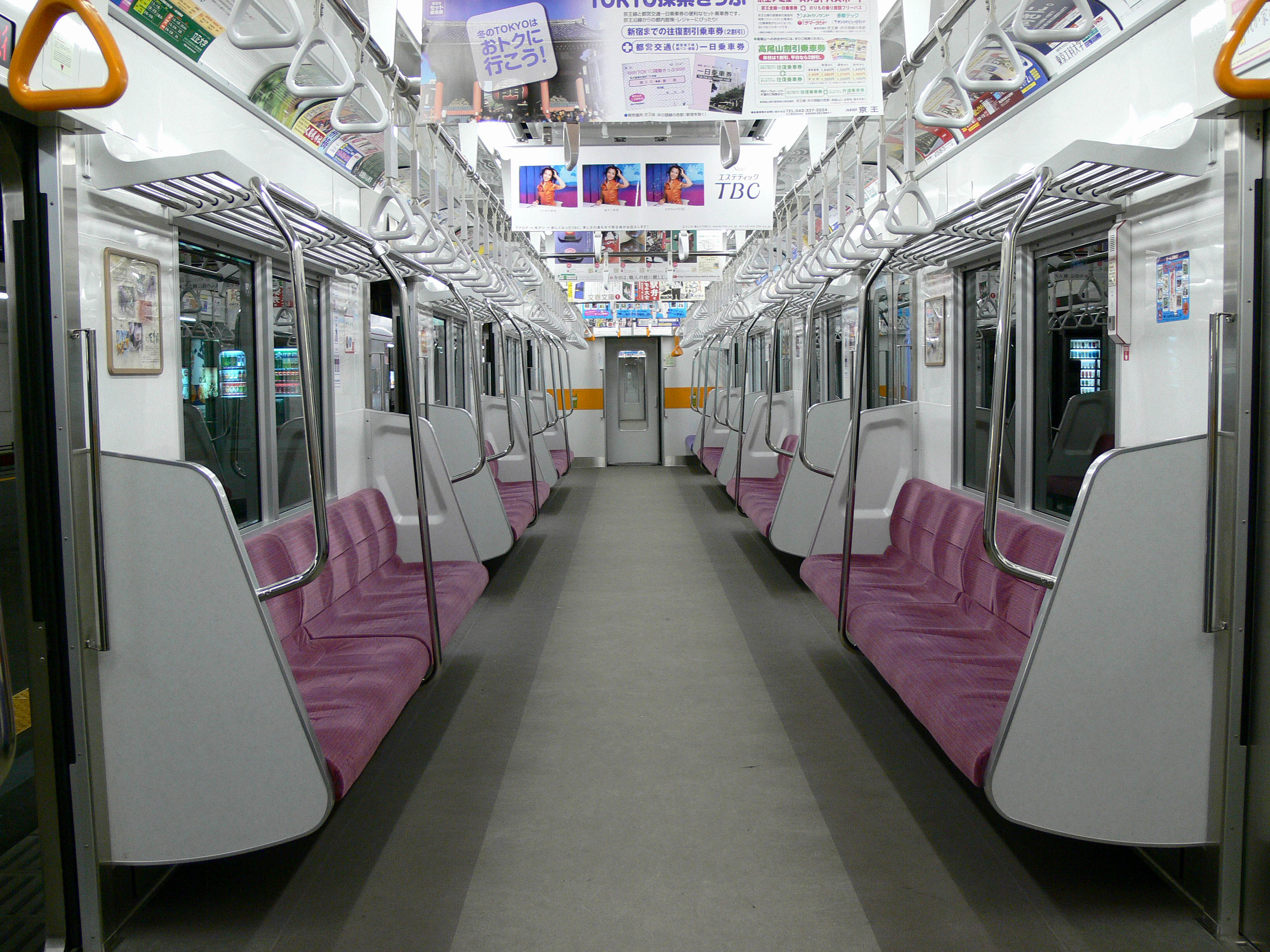
9030 series interior

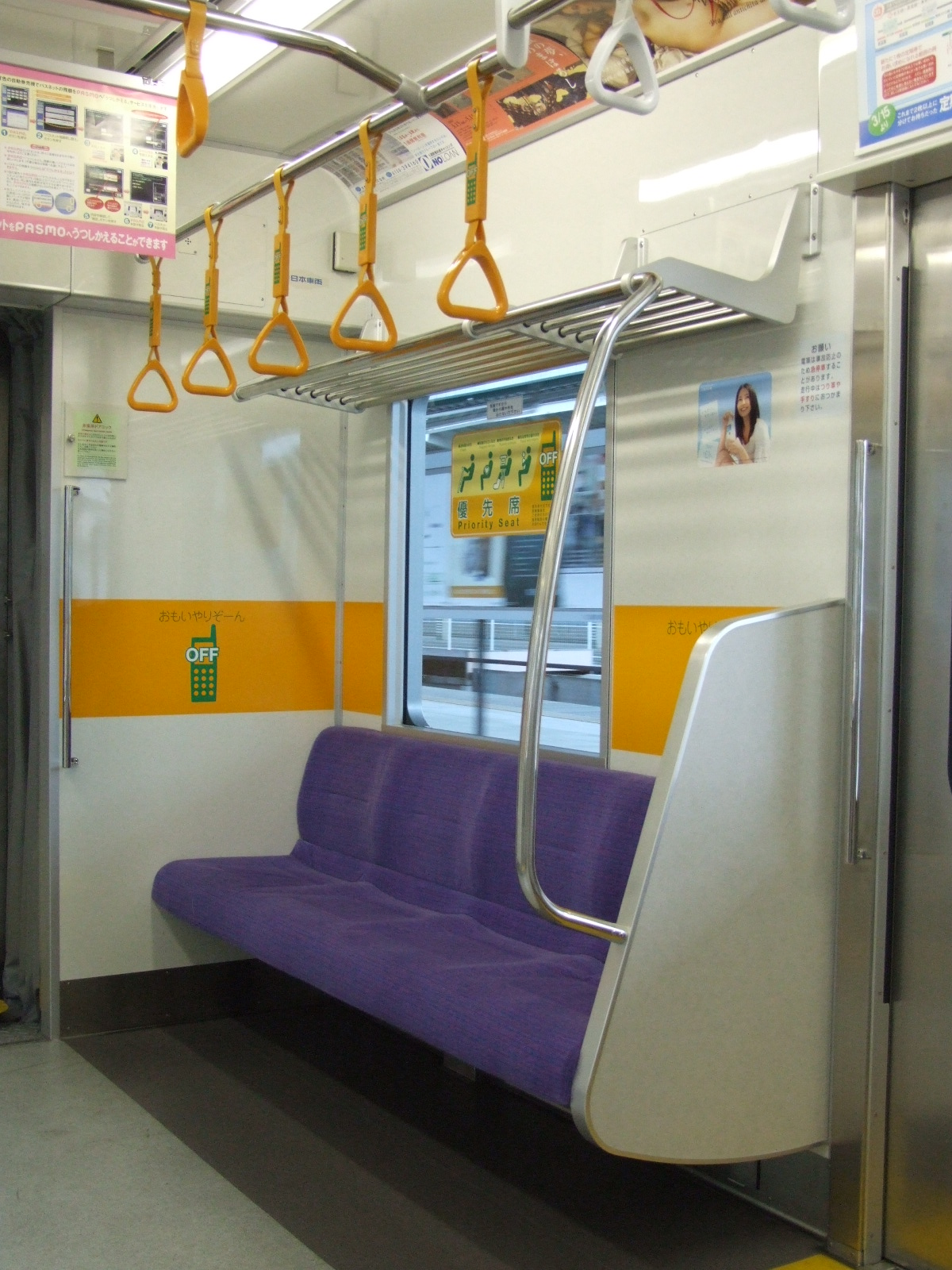
Priority seats of a 9030 series set

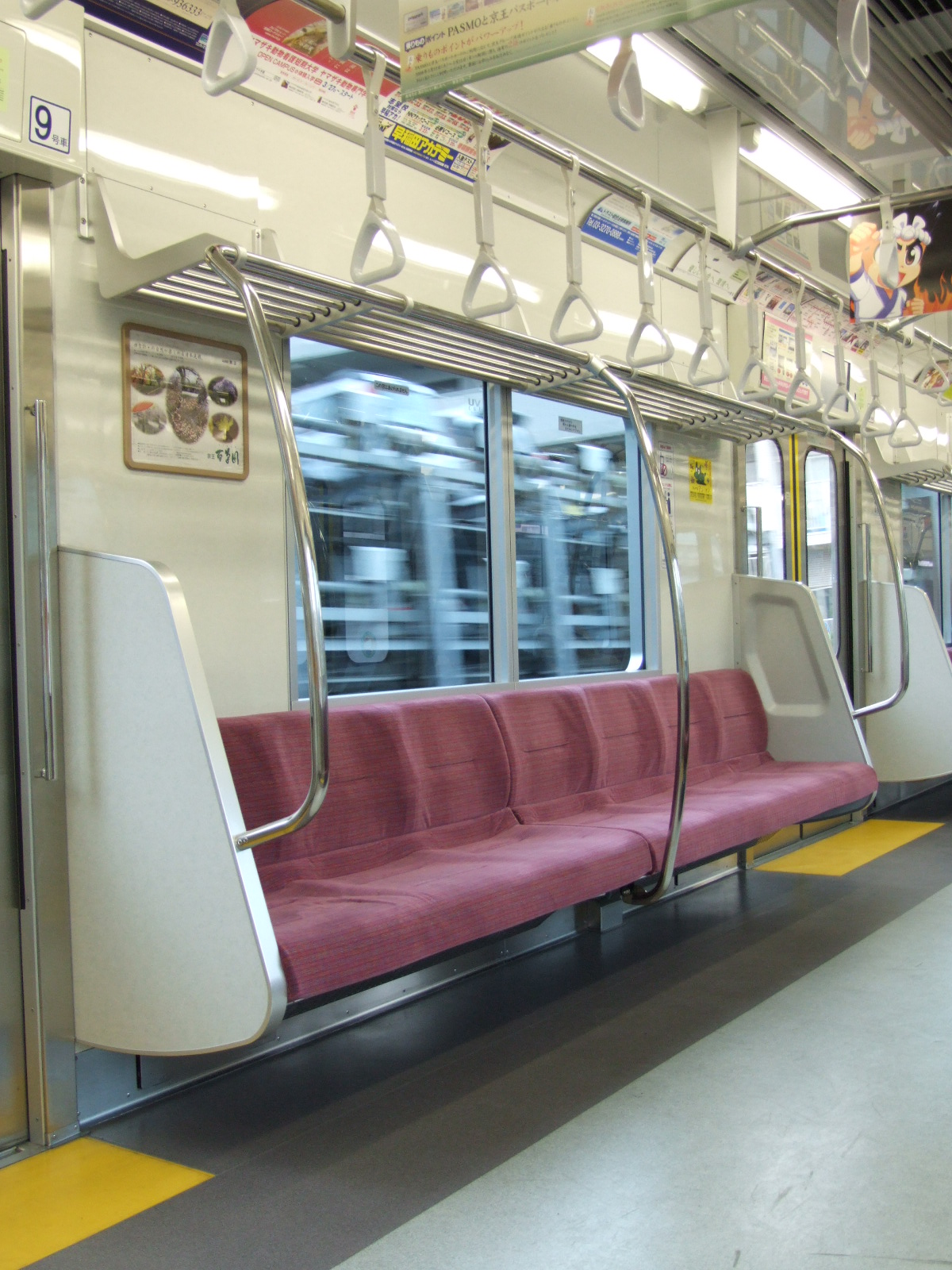
9030 series seating

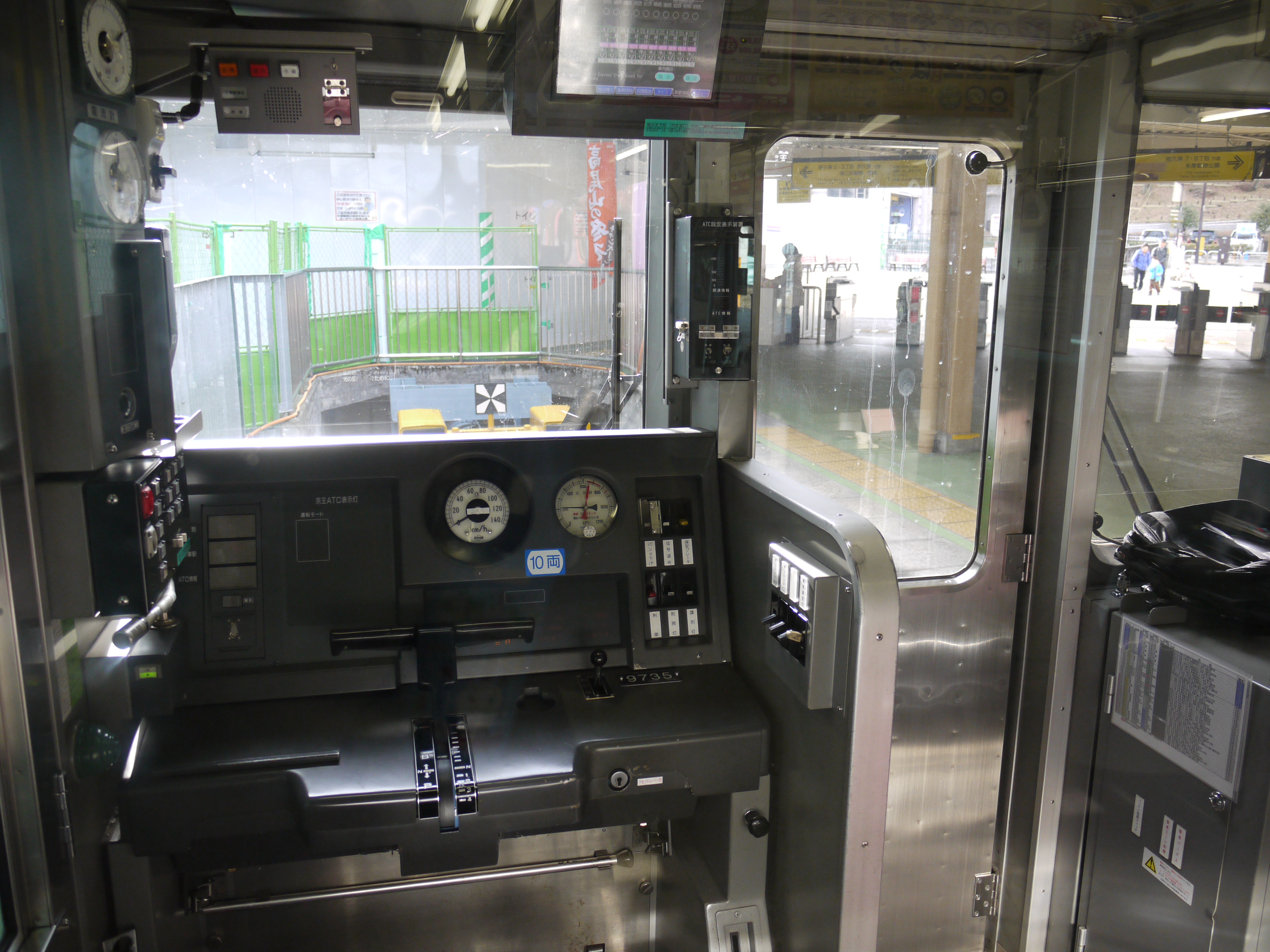
Driver's cab, February 2013

== Special liveries ==
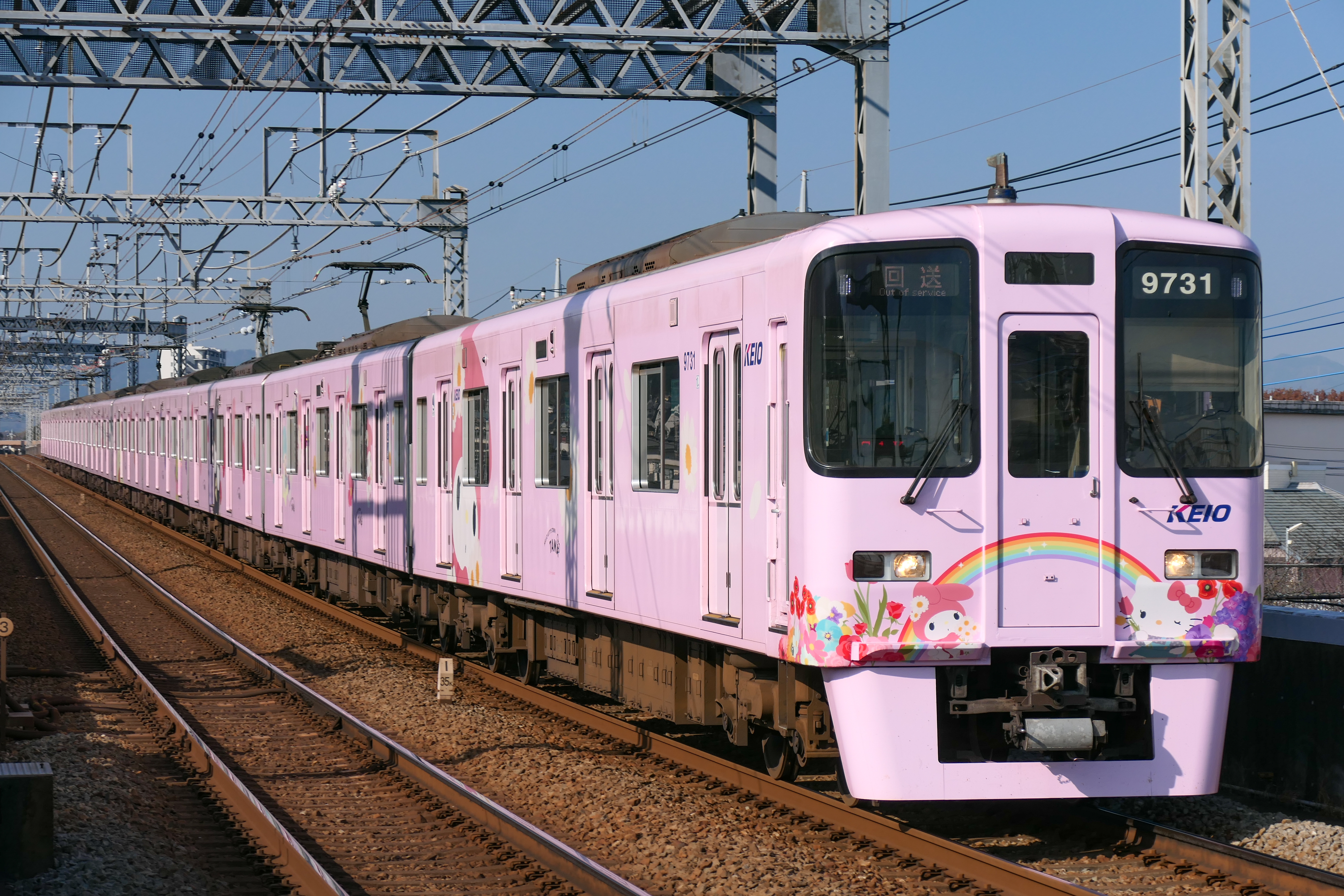
Set 9731 with original all-over Sanrio livery in November 2021

From 1 November 2018, 9000 series set 9731 was wrapped in a pink livery incorporating several Sanrio characters, such as Hello Kitty. It carried this livery until August 2024.

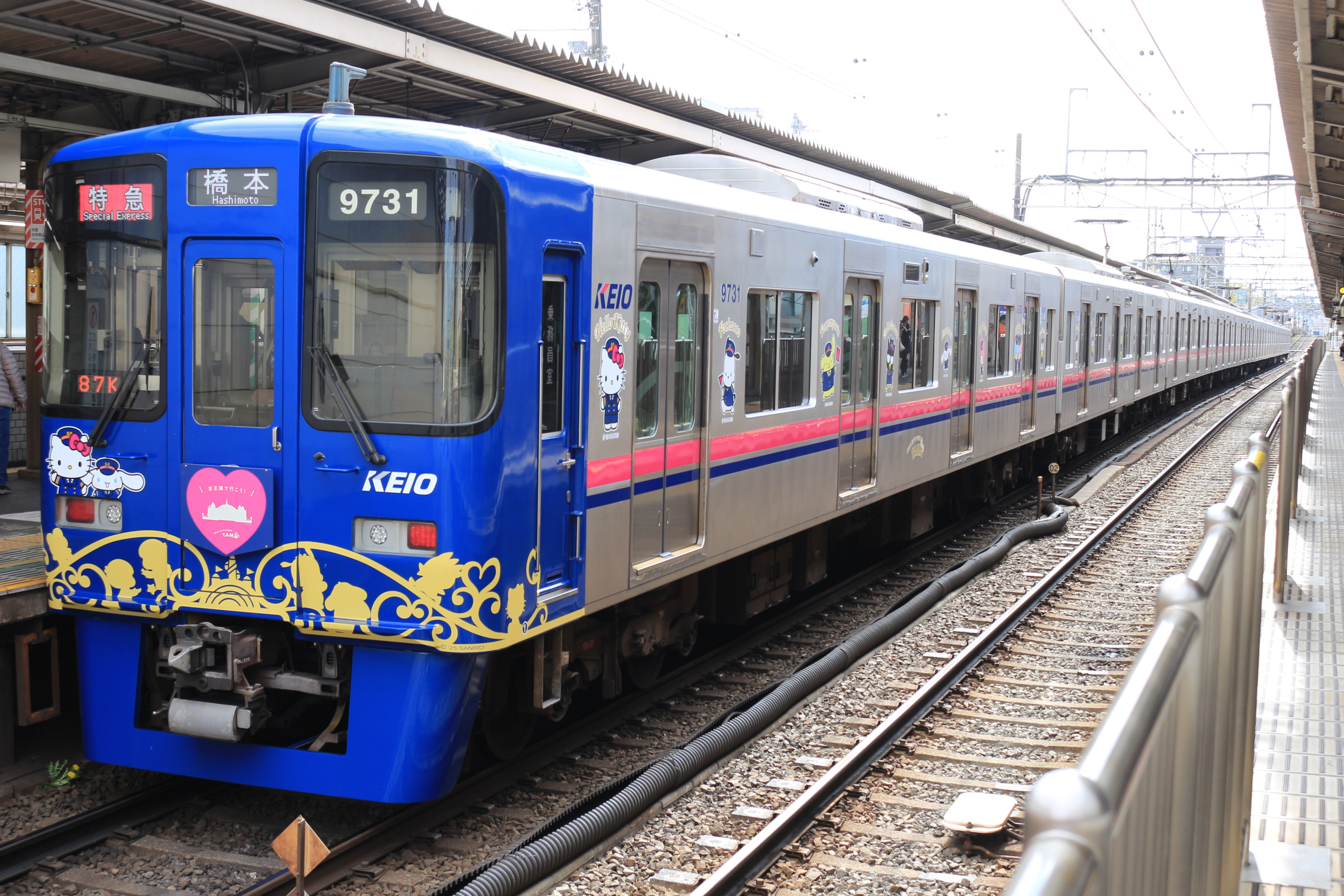
Set 9731 with front-end wrapping in April 2025

Following its refurbishment, set 9731 received a new Sanrio livery only applied to its front ends. Keio states that it has discussed adorning other refurbished sets to distinguish them from unrefurbished sets.

== Refurbishment ==
On 7 February 2025, Keio announced that its 10-car 9000 series fleet would undergo a programme of refurbishment. The work includes a renovated interior incorporating some design elements of the then-to-be-introduced 2000 series, with additional stanchion poles, dimpled stanchion poles in priority seating areas for improved grip, and wheelchair- and stroller-accessible "free spaces" in all cars. Treated sets also feature a more efficient, full SiC (silicon carbide)-based traction system, (Note: "Full SiC" entails a power module combining an SiC MOSFET (metal–oxide–semiconductor field-effect transistor) with an SiC SBD (Schottky barrier diode).) which Keio states offers approximately 20% energy savings over the type's original traction system and approximately 70% energy savings over train types without VVVF (variable frequency) traction control.

Refurbished sets returned to service from 10 March 2025.

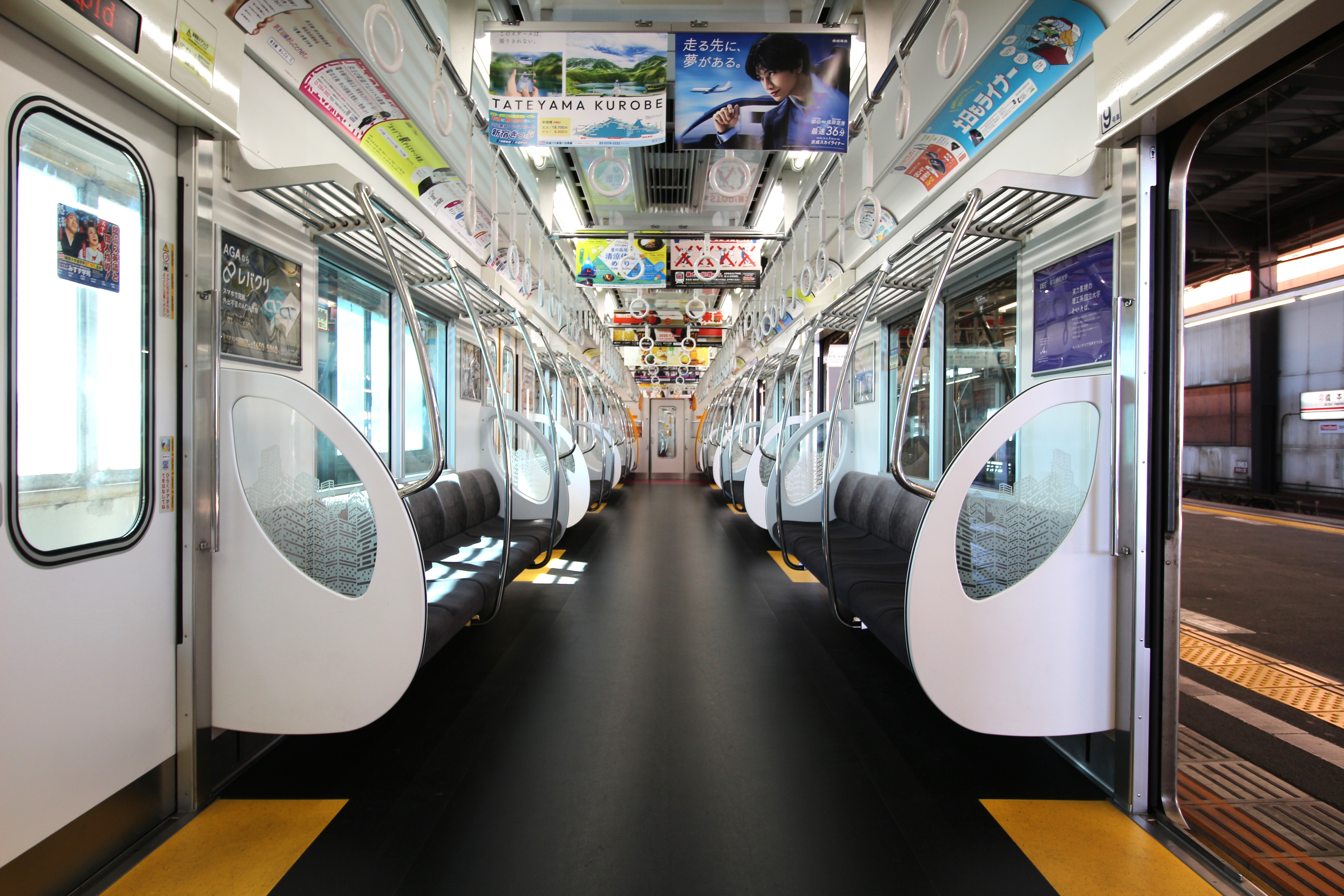
Refurbished interior

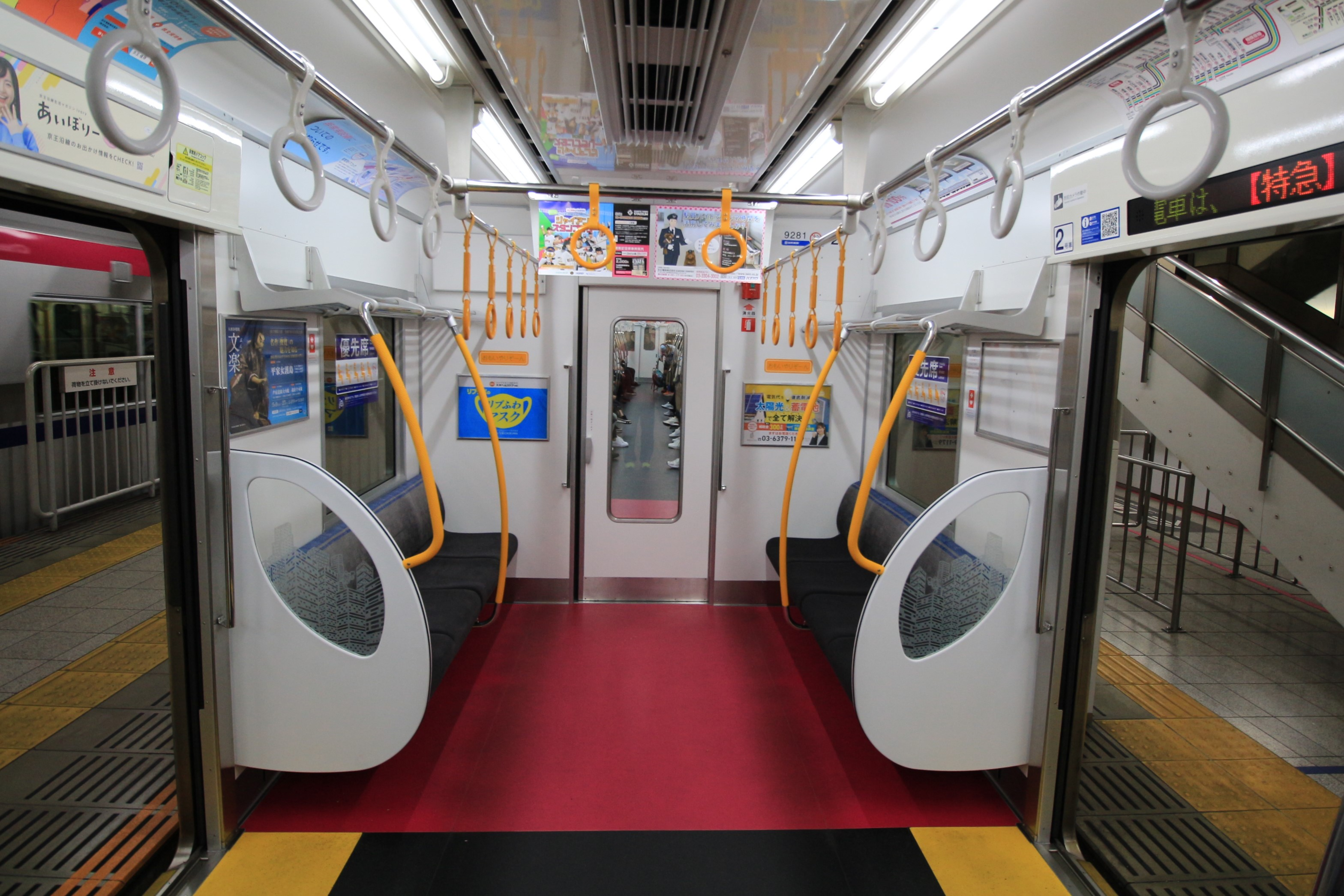
Priority seating

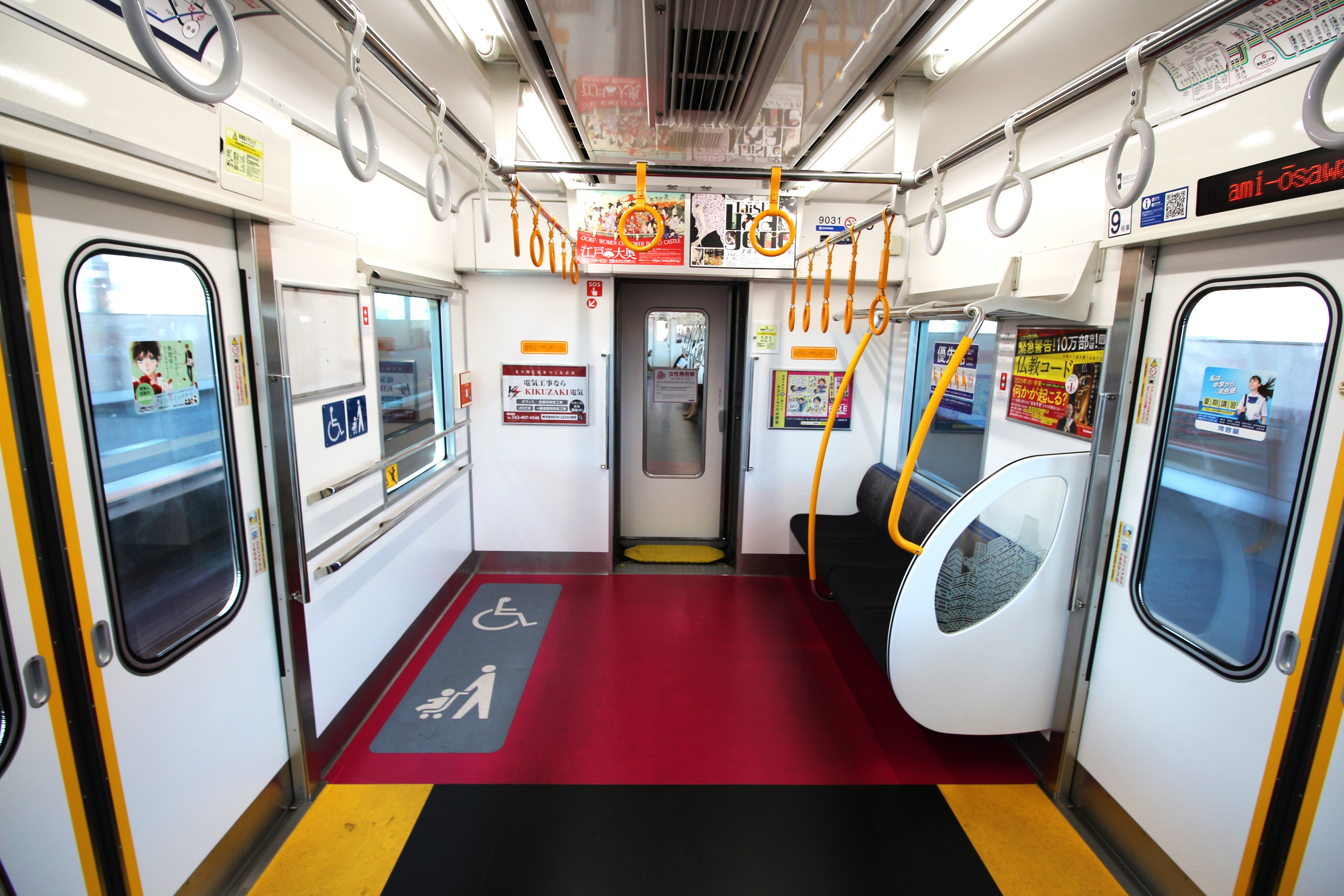
Wheelchair space
