= Kikukawa Station =

Metro station in Tokyo, Japan

Coordinates: 35.688375°N 139.806008°E

Kikukawa Station 菊川駅

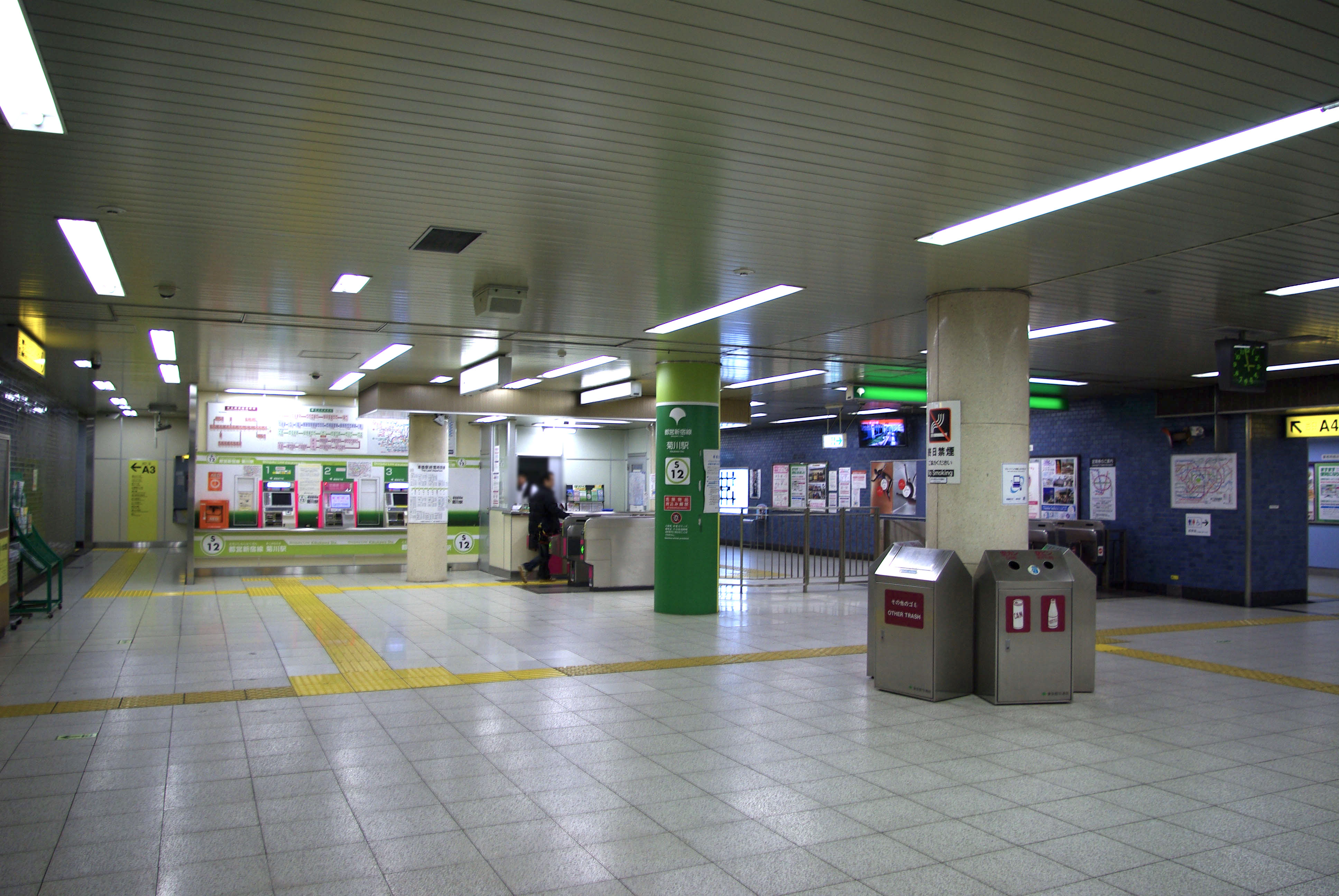
- Kikukawa Station ticket gates

General information
- Location: 3-16-2 Kikukawa, Sumida City, Tokyo （東京都墨田区菊川三丁目16-2） Japan
- Operator: Toei Subway
- Line: Shinjuku Line
- Platforms: 1 island platform
- Tracks: 2
- Connections: Bus stop

Construction
- Structure type: Underground

Other information
- Station code: S-12

History
- Opened: December 1978; 47 years ago

Passengers
- 22,193 daily

Services
Preceding station	Toei Subway	Following station
Morishita towards Shinjuku	Shinjuku Line Local	Sumiyoshi towards Motoyawata
Location
- Location within Special wards of Tokyo Location within Tokyo Bay and Bōsō Peninsula Location within Tokyo Location within Japan

Kikukawa Station (菊川駅, Kikukawa-eki) is a railway station in Sumida, Tokyo, Japan. Its station number is S-12. The station opened on December 21, 1978.

== Platforms ==
Kikukawa Station consists of a single island platform served by two tracks.

1	Shinjuku Line	for Bakuro-yokoyama and Shinjuku; Keio Line for Sasazuka, Hashimoto
2	Shinjuku Line	for Motoyawata

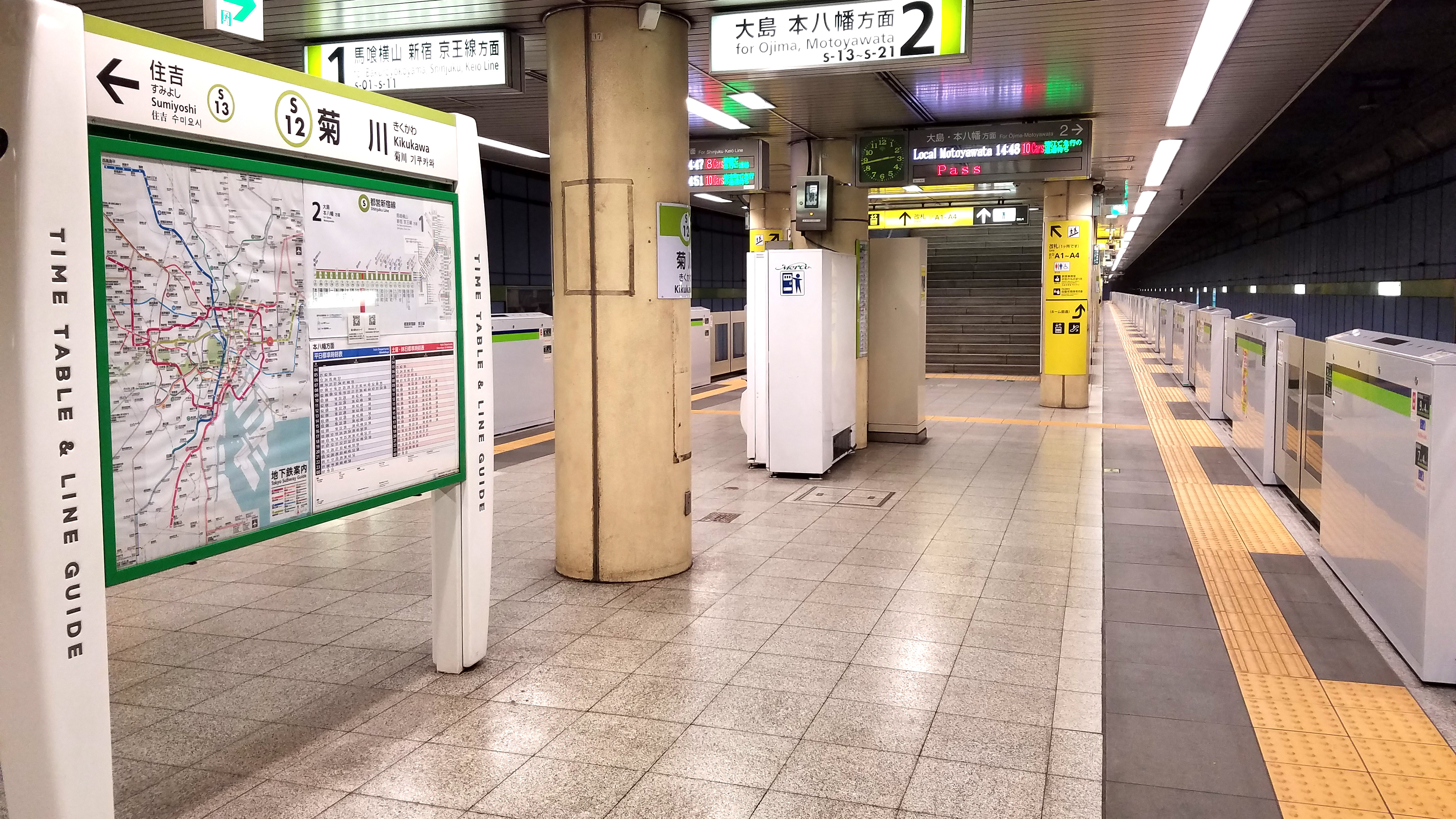
The platforms

== Surrounding area ==
The station is located underneath the intersection of Tokyo Metropolitan Routes 319 (Mitsume-dōri) and 50 (Shin-Ōhashi-dōri). The area is typically shitamachi with a mix of commercial, residential, and light industrial buildings.

== Connecting bus services ==
- Toei Bus (Kikukawa-Ekimae stop)

== Line ==
- Tokyo Metropolitan Bureau of Transportation - Toei Shinjuku Line
