= Hamacho Station =

Metro station in Tokyo, Japan

Hamacho Station 浜町駅

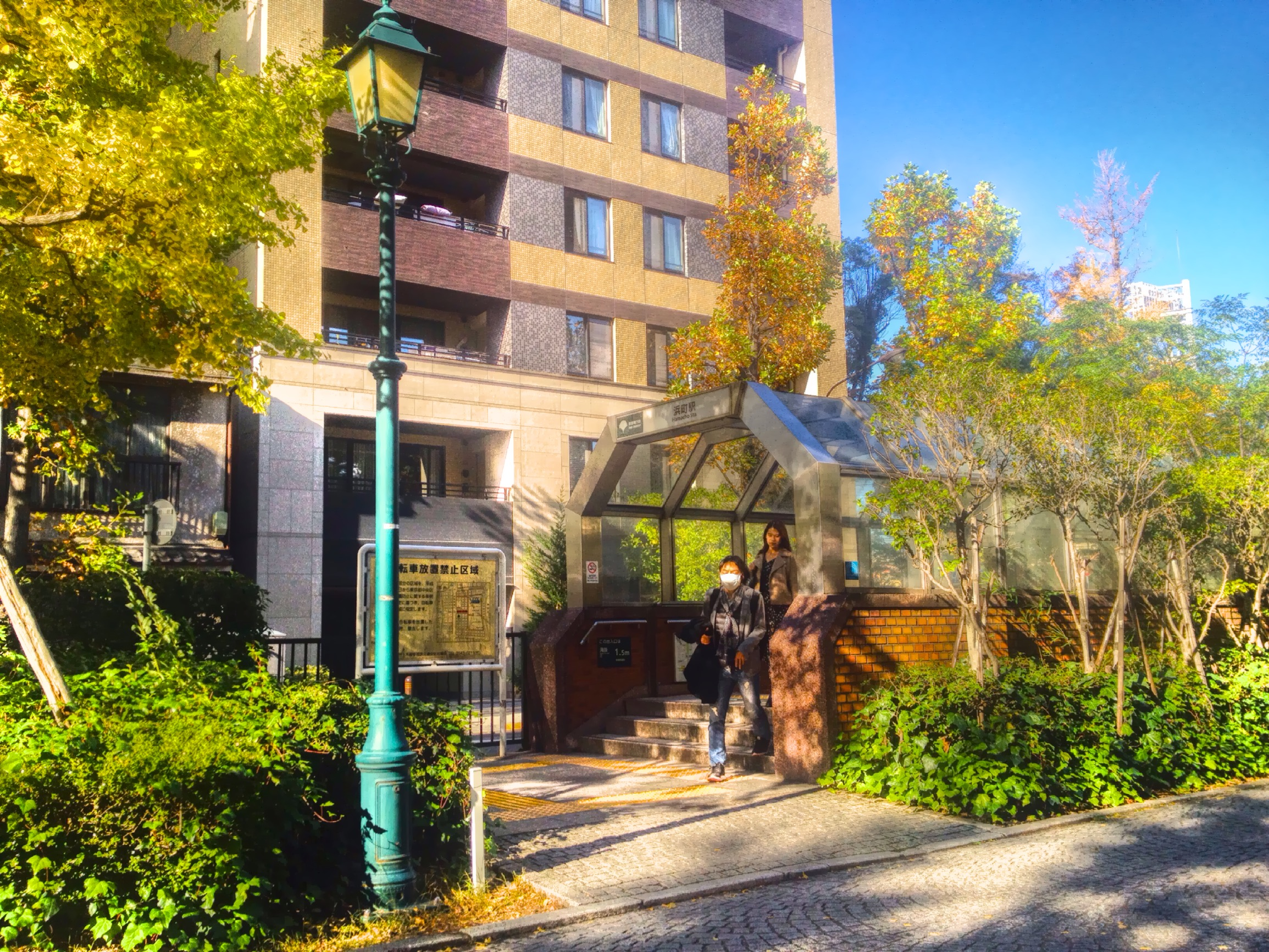
- Entrance to Hamacho Station, 2017

General information
- Location: 2-59-3 Nihonbashi-hamachō, Chūō-ku, Tokyo; Japan
- Coordinates: 35.688264°N 139.789188°E
- Operator: Toei Subway
- Line: Shinjuku Line
- Distance: 8.7 km (5.4 mi) from Shinjuku
- Platforms: 1 island platform
- Tracks: 2
- Connections: Bus stop

Construction
- Structure type: Underground

Other information
- Station code: S-10
- Website: Official website

History
- Opened: 21 December 1978; 47 years ago

Passengers
- FY2011: 21,426 daily

Services
Preceding station	Toei Subway	Following station
Bakuro-yokoyama towards Shinjuku	Shinjuku Line Local	Morishita towards Motoyawata
Location
- Location within Special wards of Tokyo Location within Tokyo Bay and Bōsō Peninsula Location within Tokyo Location within Japan

Hamacho Station (浜町駅, Hamachō-eki) is a subway station on the Toei Shinjuku Line in Chūō, Tokyo, Japan, operated by Tokyo Metropolitan Bureau of Transportation (Toei). The station opened on December 21, 1978, and it is numbered "S-10".

== Lines ==
Hamacho Station is served by the Toei Shinjuku Line, and lies 8.7 km from the starting point of the line at Shinjuku.

== Layout ==
Hamacho Station has a single underground island platform serving two tracks.

=== Platforms ===
1	Shinjuku Line	for Bakuroyokoyama and Shinjuku; Keio line for Sasazuka and Hashimoto
2	Shinjuku Line	for Morishita, Ojima, and Motoyawata

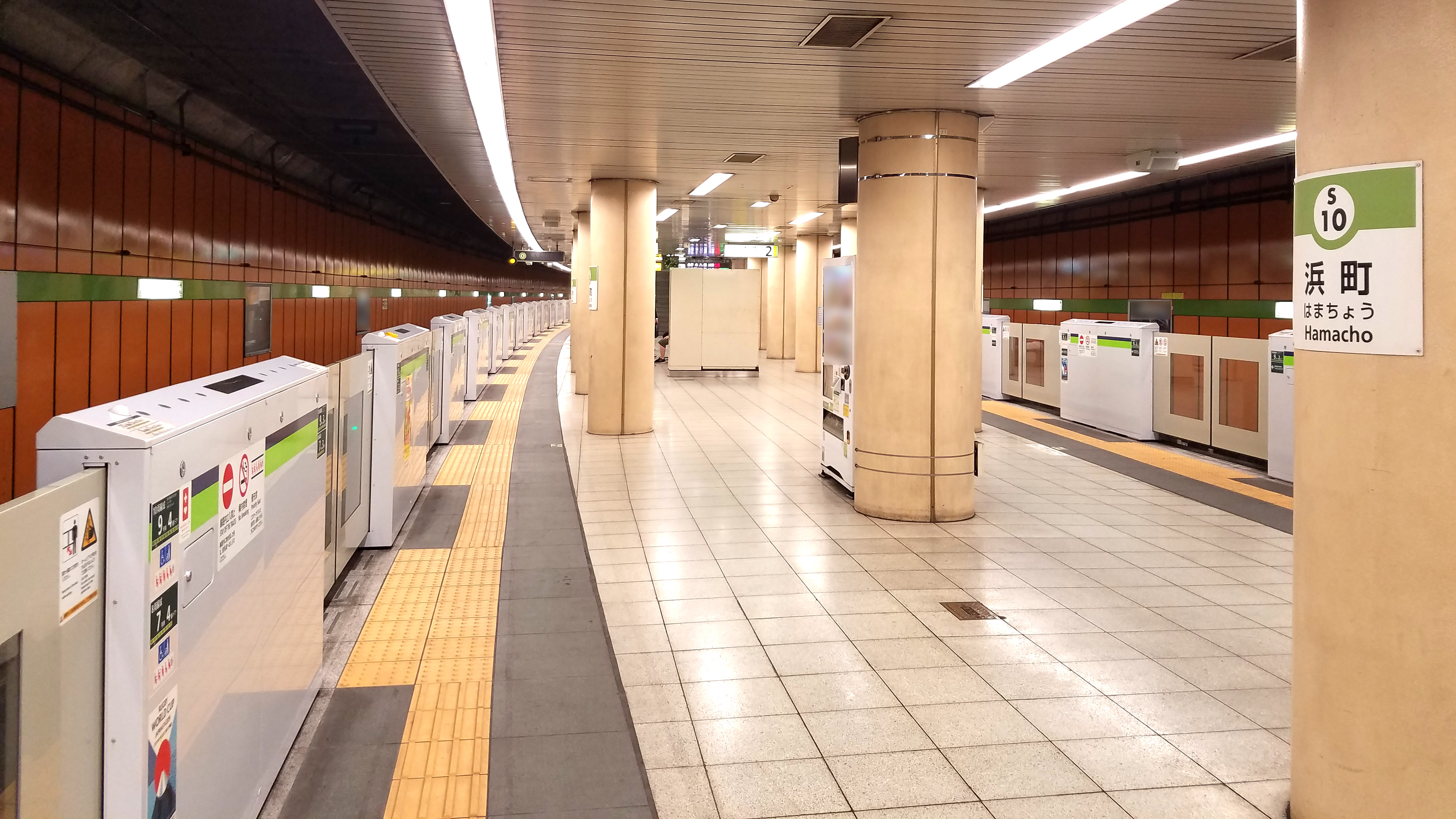
Platforms

== History ==
The station opened on 21 December 1978.

== Passenger statistics ==
In fiscal 2011, the station was used by an average of 21,426 passengers daily.

== Surrounding area ==
The station is located underneath Hamachō Park bordering the Sumida River. The Shuto Expressway No. 6 Mukōjima Line runs to the east. The area is a mix of mid-rise office buildings and scattered apartment buildings. The Meiji-za theatre is a short walk to the west. Other points of interest include:

- SSP Co., Ltd. headquarters
- Kagome Co., Ltd. Tokyo headquarters
- Shin-Ōhashi and Kiyosubashi bridges
- Chūō Municipal Comprehensive Sports Center
- Chūō Municipal Nihonbashi Junior High School
- Hisamatsu Police Station
- Komoro Soba
- Realta (1 star review)
- Tokyo Television Center
- Button Museum

== Connecting bus service ==
Toei Bus: Hisamatsuchō

- Aki 26 for Kasai Station
- Edo Bus (Chūō City Community Bus): Hamachō-Eki (Meijiza-mae)
- North Loop for Chūō city hall

== See also ==
- List of railway stations in Japan
