= Toei Shinjuku Line =

Subway line in Tokyo, Japan

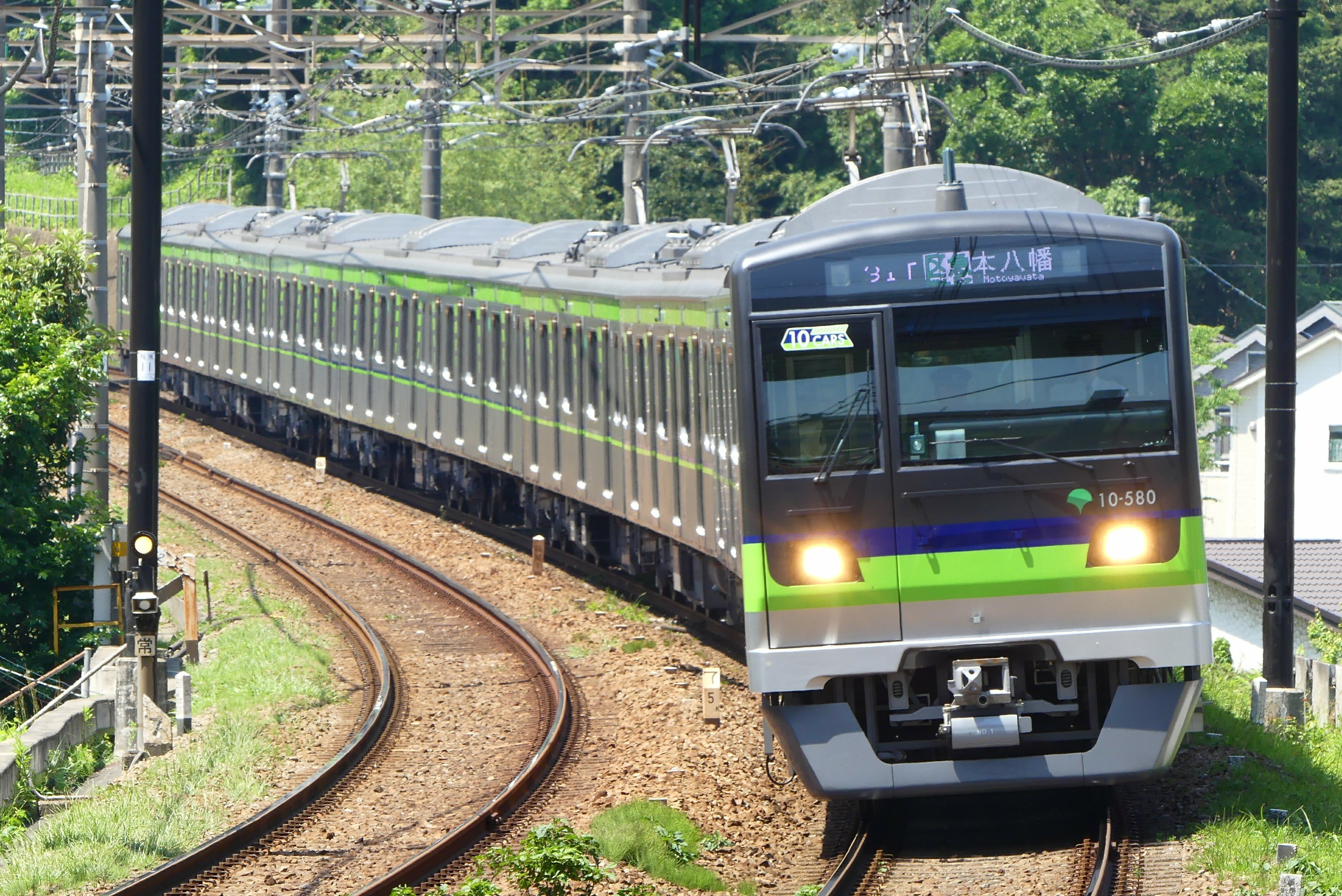
- A Toei Shinjuku Line 10-300 series train

Overview
- Other name: Line 10
- Native name: 都営新宿線
- Status: In service
- Owner: Tokyo Metropolitan Bureau of Transportation
- Line number: S
- Locale: Tokyo, Chiba prefectures
- Termini: Shinjuku; Motoyawata
- Stations: 21
- Color on map: Lime green

Service
- Type: Rapid transit
- System: Tokyo subway (Toei Subway)
- Operator: Tokyo Metropolitan Bureau of Transportation
- Depot: Ōjima
- Rolling stock: Toei 10-300 series Keio 5000 and 9000 series
- Daily ridership: 745,889 (2016)

History
- Opened: 21 December 1978; 47 years ago
- Last extension: 1989

Technical
- Line length: 23.5 km (14.6 mi)
- Num of tracks: 2
- Track gauge: 1,372 mm (4 ft 6 in)
- Minimum radius: 167 m (548 ft)
- Electrification: Overhead line, 1,500 V DC
- Operating speed: 75 km/h (47 mph)
- Signalling: Cab signalling, closed block
- Train protection system: D-ATC
- Maximum incline: 3.5%

The Toei Shinjuku Line (都営新宿線, Toei Shinjuku-sen) is a rapid transit line in Tokyo and Chiba Prefecture, Japan, operated by the municipal Toei Subway. The line runs between Motoyawata in Ichikawa, Chiba in the east and Shinjuku in the west. At Shinjuku, most trains continue as through services to Sasazuka on the Keiō New Line, with some services continuing to Hashimoto in Sagamihara, Kanagawa via the Keiō Line and the Keiō Sagamihara Line.

On maps and signboards, the line is shown in the color leaf green. Stations carry the letter "S" followed by a two-digit number inside a lime green circle.

In fiscal year 2023, the Shinjuku Line was Toei's third most profitable line, earning ¥6.25 billion in surplus. It served 704,235 passengers on average per day, the second highest in the Toei network (after the Oedo Line).

The name “Shinjuku Line” dates to 1903, when a Tokyo tram line of the same name opened, operating above ground between Shinjuku and Yotsuya, along the same route of the present-day Tokyo Metro Marunouchi Line. The name predates the Seibu Shinjuku Line, which was renamed from the Murayama Line in 1952.

== Basic data ==
- Double-tracking: Entire line
- Railway signalling: D-ATC

== Overview ==
Unlike all other Tokyo subway lines, which were built to 1,435 mm (4 ft 8 1/2 in) or 1,067 mm (3 ft 6 in) gauges, the Shinjuku Line was built with a track gauge of 1,372 mm (4 ft 6 in) to allow through operations onto the Keiō network. The line was planned as Line 10 according to reports of a committee of the former Ministry of Transportation; thus the rarely used official name of the line is the "Number 10 Shinjuku Line" (10号線新宿線, Jū-gō-sen Shinjuku-sen).

According to the Tokyo Metropolitan Bureau of Transportation, as of June 2009 the Shinjuku Line was the third most crowded subway line in Tokyo, at its peak running at 181%^{[a]} capacity between Nishi-ōjima and Sumiyoshi stations.

It is the only Toei line to run outside Tokyo, and one of only two Tokyo subway lines to run into Chiba Prefecture, the other being the Tokyo Metro Tozai Line. The Tokyo Metro Yūrakuchō Line, the Tokyo Metro Fukutoshin Line and the Tokyo Metro Tozai Line are the only other subway lines to run beyond Tokyo, with the shared northern terminus of the first two at Wakōshi Station in Saitama Prefecture, and the eastern terminus of the Tozai Line being at Nishi-Funabashi Station in Chiba Prefecture. However, all lines that have through services contain at least one route beyond Tokyo.

== History ==
In April 1968, the Urban Transportation Council proposed Line 10 as a route running from Roka-koen via Shinjuku and Yasukuni-dōri, passing through Ichigaya, Jimbochō, Sudachō, and Hamachō, and terminating at Sumiyoshichō.

Following this recommendation, the Ministry of Construction issued Notice No. 3731 on December 28 of the same year, formally approving the construction of the Shinjuku–Sumiyoshichō section (12.5 km) as Line 10, officially designated the Tokyo Metropolitan Rapid Transit Line No. 10. On 20 May 1969, Notice No. 2430 extended the planned route by incorporating the Keio Line between Chōfu and Shinjuku and further extending the urban planning area to Higashi-Ōjima, the site of the line’s depot, bringing the total planned length to 31.2 km.

On 1 May 1971, construction began near Morishita and Sumiyoshi.

Subsequently, in March 1972, Urban Transportation Council Report No. 15 added the sections between Hashimoto, Tama New Town Chuo, Chofu, and Roka Koen, as well as between Sumiyoshi-cho, Higashi-Ojima, Shinozaki-cho, Motoyawata, Kashiwai, northern Kamagaya, the Chiba New Town Komuro area, and the Chiba New Town Inba area. Additionally, it was decided that the section between Chofu and Shinjuku would be double-tracked as part of the Keio Line. Of these routes, the section between Shinjuku and Motoyawata opened in stages as the Toei Shinjuku Line, the section between Hashimoto and Chofu opened as the Keio Sagamihara Line, and the section between Sasazuka and Shinjuku opened as an extension of the Keio Line (the Keio New Line).

=== Timeline ===
- 21 December 1978: Iwamotochō – Higashi-ōjima section opens.
- 16 March 1980: Shinjuku – Iwamotochō section opens; through service onto Keiō lines begins.
- 23 December 1983: Higashi-ōjima – Funabori section opens.
- 14 September 1986: Funabori – Shinozaki section opens.
- 19 March 1989: Shinozaki – Motoyawata section opens.

== Stations ==
- Express trains stop at stations marked with a circle (●), while local trains make all stops.
- Express trains run between Motoyawata Station and Hashimoto Station on the Keiō Sagamihara Line via the Keio Main Line and Keio New Line. Express trains only run during peak hours; westbound in the mornings and eastbound in the evenings.
- On weekends and holidays, two trains run through to Takaosanguchi Station on the Keiō Takao Line and one runs through to Tama-Dōbutsukōen Station on the Keiō Dōbutsuen Line.

No.	Station	Distance in km (mi)		Express	Transfers	Location	
No.	Station	Between stations	Total	Express	Transfers	Location	
↑ Through-running services to/from ↑ Sasazuka via the Keiō New Line; Wakabadai, Keiō-tama-center, Hashimoto via the Keiō Line and Sagamihara Line
S-01	Shinjuku 新宿	—N/a	0 (0)	●	Marunouchi Line (M-08); Ōedo Line (E-27); Chūō Line (JC05); Chūō–Sōbu Line (JB10); Yamanote Line (JY17); Saikyō Line (JA11); Shōnan–Shinjuku Line (JS20); Odawara Line (OH01); Keiō Line/Keiō New Line (KO01, through service); Shinjuku Line (Seibu-Shinjuku: SS-01)	Shinjuku	Tokyo
S-02	Shinjuku-sanchome 新宿三丁目	0.8 (0.50)		|	Marunouchi Line (M-09); Fukutoshin Line (F-13)	Shinjuku	Tokyo
S-03	Akebonobashi 曙橋	1.5 (0.93)	2.3 (1.4)	|		Shinjuku	Tokyo
S-04	Ichigaya 市ヶ谷	1.4 (0.87)	3.7 (2.3)	●	Yūrakuchō Line (Y-14); Namboku Line (N-09); Chūō–Sōbu Line (JB15)	Chiyoda	Tokyo
S-05	Kudanshita 九段下	1.3 (0.81)	5.0 (3.1)	|	Hanzōmon Line (Z-06); Tōzai Line (T-07)	Chiyoda	Tokyo
S-06	Jimbocho 神保町	0.6 (0.37)	5.6 (3.5)	●	Mita Line (I-10); Hanzōmon Line (Z-07)	Chiyoda	Tokyo
S-07	Ogawamachi 小川町	0.9 (0.56)	6.5 (4.0)	|	Ginza Line (Kanda: G-13); Marunouchi Line (Awajicho: M-19); Chiyoda Line (Shin-ochanomizu: C-12)	Chiyoda	Tokyo
S-08	Iwamotocho 岩本町	0.8 (0.50)	7.3 (4.5)	|	At Akihabara: Hibiya Line (H-16) Yamanote Line (JY03) Keihin–Tōhoku Line (JK28) Chūō–Sōbu Line (JB19) Tsukuba Express (TX01)	Chiyoda	Tokyo
S-09	Bakuro-yokoyama 馬喰横山	0.8 (0.50)	8.1 (5.0)	●	Asakusa Line (Higashi-nihombashi: A-15); Sōbu Line (Bakurochō: JO21)	Chūō	Tokyo
S-10	Hamacho 浜町	0.6 (0.37)	8.7 (5.4)	|		Chūō	Tokyo
S-11	Morishita 森下	0.8 (0.50)	9.5 (5.9)	●	Ōedo Line (E-13)	Kōtō	Tokyo
S-12	Kikukawa 菊川	0.8 (0.50)	10.3 (6.4)	|		Sumida	Tokyo
S-13	Sumiyoshi 住吉	0.9 (0.56)	11.2 (7.0)	|	Hanzōmon Line (Z-12)	Kōtō	Tokyo
S-14	Nishi-ojima 西大島	1.0 (0.62)	12.2 (7.6)	|		Kōtō	Tokyo
S-15	Ojima 大島	0.7 (0.43)	12.9 (8.0)	●		Kōtō	Tokyo
S-16	Higashi-ojima 東大島	1.2 (0.75)	14.1 (8.8)	|		Kōtō	Tokyo
S-17	Funabori 船堀	1.7 (1.1)	15.8 (9.8)	●		Edogawa	Tokyo
S-18	Ichinoe 一之江	1.7 (1.1)	17.5 (10.9)	|		Edogawa	Tokyo
S-19	Mizue 瑞江	1.7 (1.1)	19.2 (11.9)	|		Edogawa	Tokyo
S-20	Shinozaki 篠崎	1.5 (0.93)	20.7 (12.9)	|		Edogawa	Tokyo
S-21	Moto-Yawata 本八幡	2.8 (1.7)	23.5 (14.6)	●	Chūō–Sōbu Line (JB28); Main Line (Keisei Yawata: KS16)	Ichikawa, Chiba	

== Rolling stock ==
The Toei Shinjuku Line is served by the following types of 10-car EMUs. Until 11 August 2022, the line was also served by 8-car trains.

=== Current ===
- Toei 10-300 series
- Keio 5000 series
- Keio 9000 series
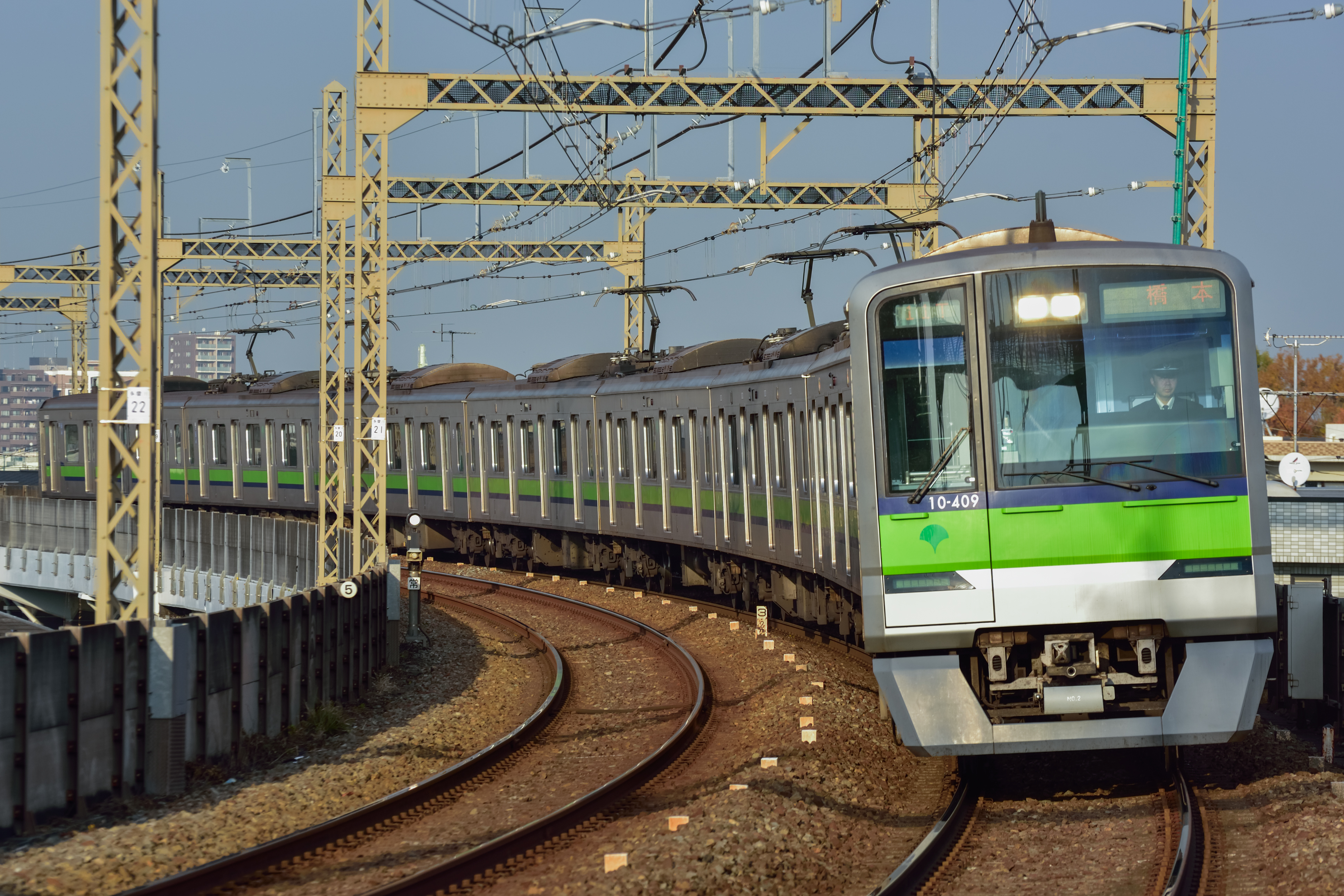
Toei 10-300 series EMU

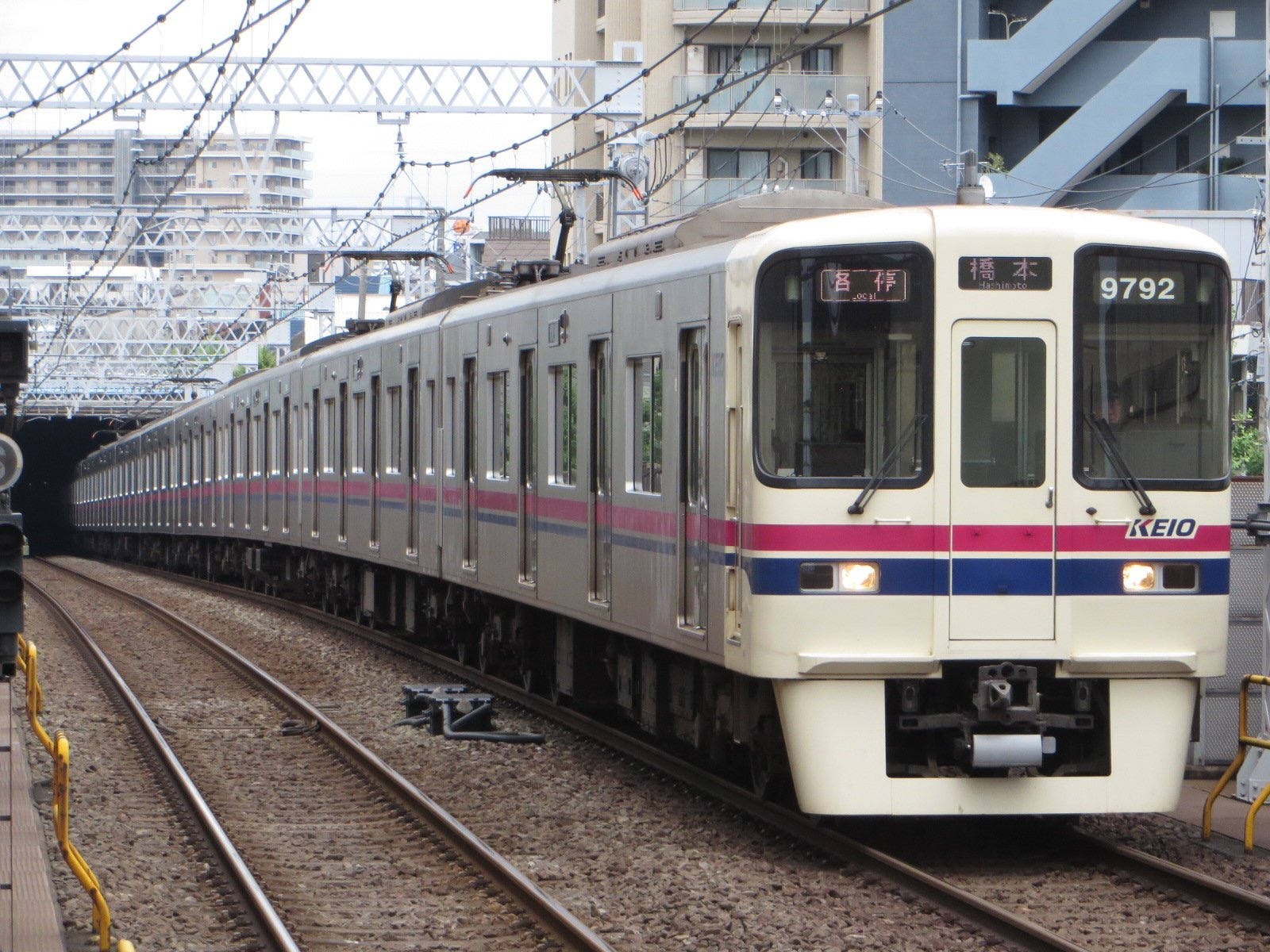
Keio 9000 series EMU

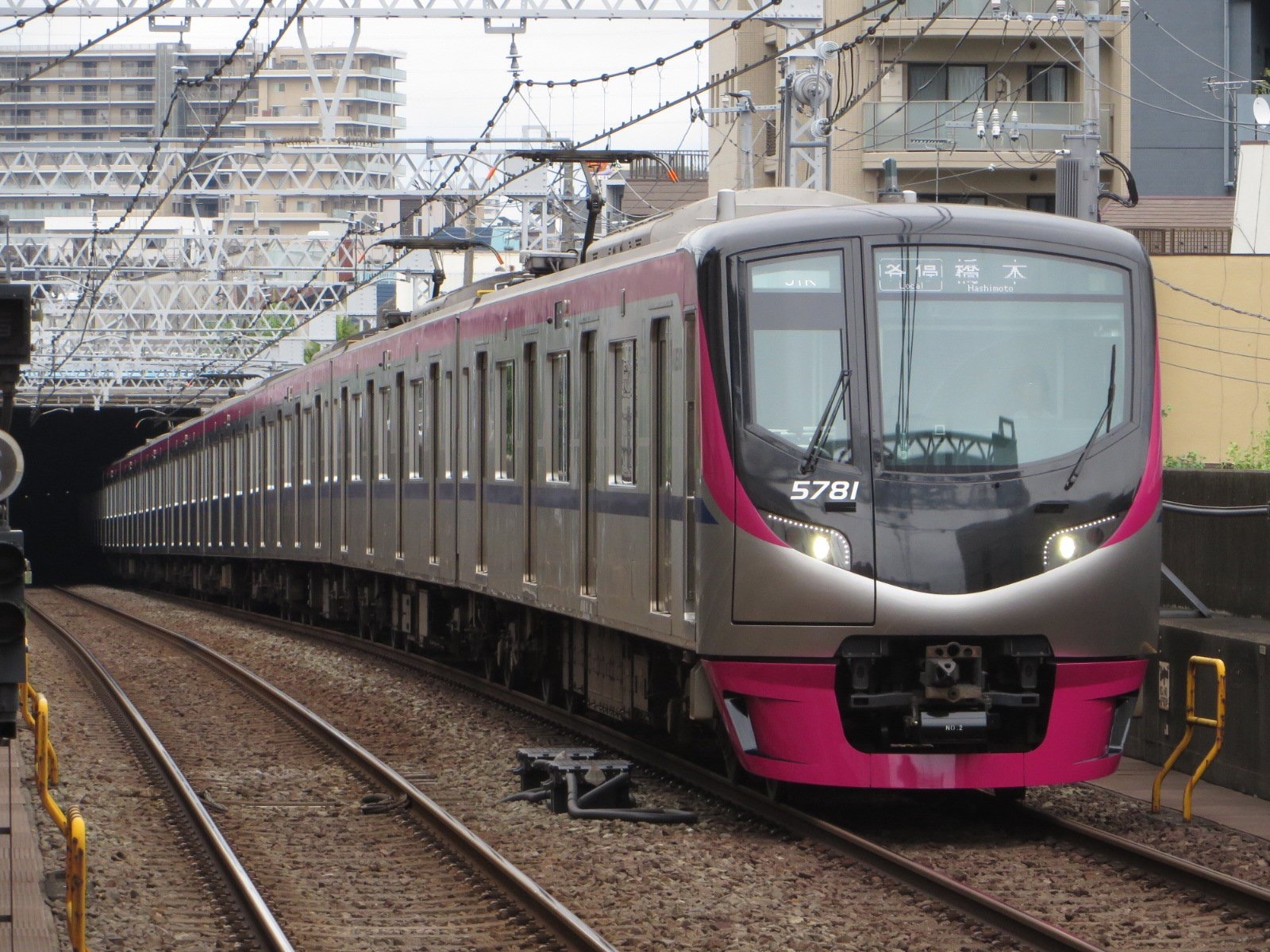
Keio 5000 series EMU

=== Former ===
- Toei 10-300R series (until 2017)
- Toei 10-000 series (until 2018)
- Keio 6000 series (until 2011)

== Notes ==
a. Crowding levels defined by the Ministry of Land, Infrastructure, Transport and Tourism:

100% — Commuters have enough personal space and are able to take a seat or stand while holding onto the straps or hand rails.
150% — Commuters have enough personal space to read a newspaper.
180% — Commuters must fold newspapers to read.
200% — Commuters are pressed against each other in each compartment but can still read small magazines.
250% — Commuters are pressed against each other, unable to move.
