= Sumiyoshi Station (Tokyo) =

Metro station in Tokyo, Japan

Sumiyoshi Station 住吉駅

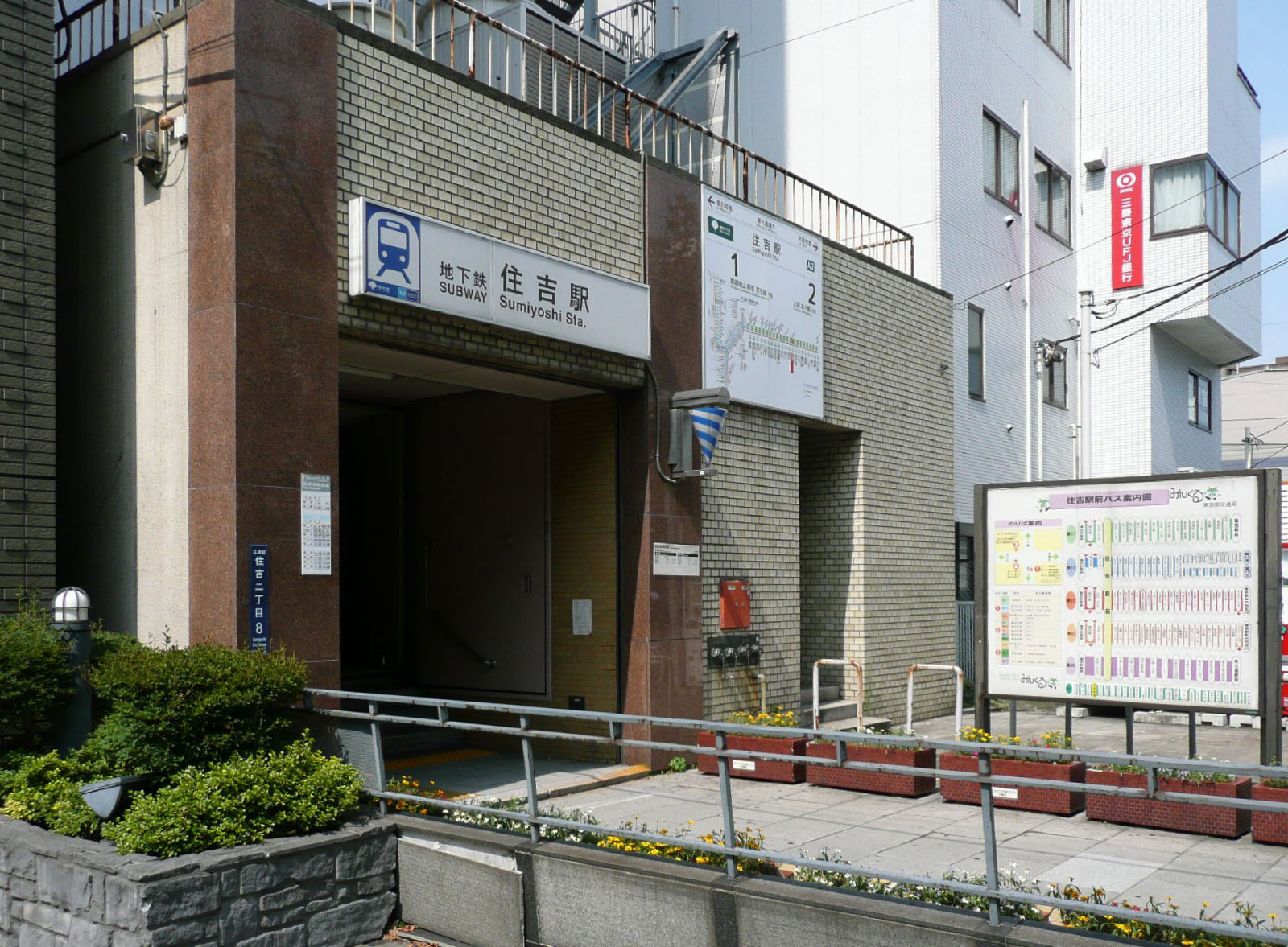
- Entrance A2 in July 2008

General information
- Location: Kōtō, Tokyo; Japan
- Coordinates: 35.689091°N 139.816132°E
- Operator: Toei Subway; Tokyo Metro
- Lines: Shinjuku Line; Hanzōmon Line
- Platforms: 4 side platforms
- Tracks: 4

Construction
- Structure type: Underground

Other information
- Station code: S-13, Z-12

History
- Opened: 21 December 1978; 47 years ago

Services
Preceding station	Tokyo Metro	Following station
Kiyosumi-shirakawa towards Shibuya	Hanzōmon Line	Kinshicho towards Oshiage
Preceding station	Toei Subway	Following station
Kikukawa towards Shinjuku	Shinjuku Line Local	Nishi-ojima towards Motoyawata
Location
- Location within Special wards of Tokyo Location within Tokyo Bay and Bōsō Peninsula Location within Tokyo Location within Japan

Sumiyoshi Station (住吉駅, Sumiyoshi-eki) is a subway station in Kōtō, Tokyo, Japan, jointly operated by Tokyo Metropolitan Bureau of Transportation (Toei) and Tokyo Metro. The station numbers are Z-12 for the Tokyo Metro Hanzomon Line and S-13 for the Toei Shinjuku Line.

== Lines ==
Sumiyoshi Station is served by the following two lines.

- Toei Shinjuku Line (S-13)
- Tokyo Metro Hanzomon Line (Z-12)

== Station layout ==
- B1 level: Concourses
- B2 level: Ticket halls/gates; Toei Shinjuku Line platforms
- B3 level: Tokyo Metro Hanzomon Line platform 1 (for Shibuya)
- B4 level: Tokyo Metro Hanzomon Line platform 2 (for Oshiage)
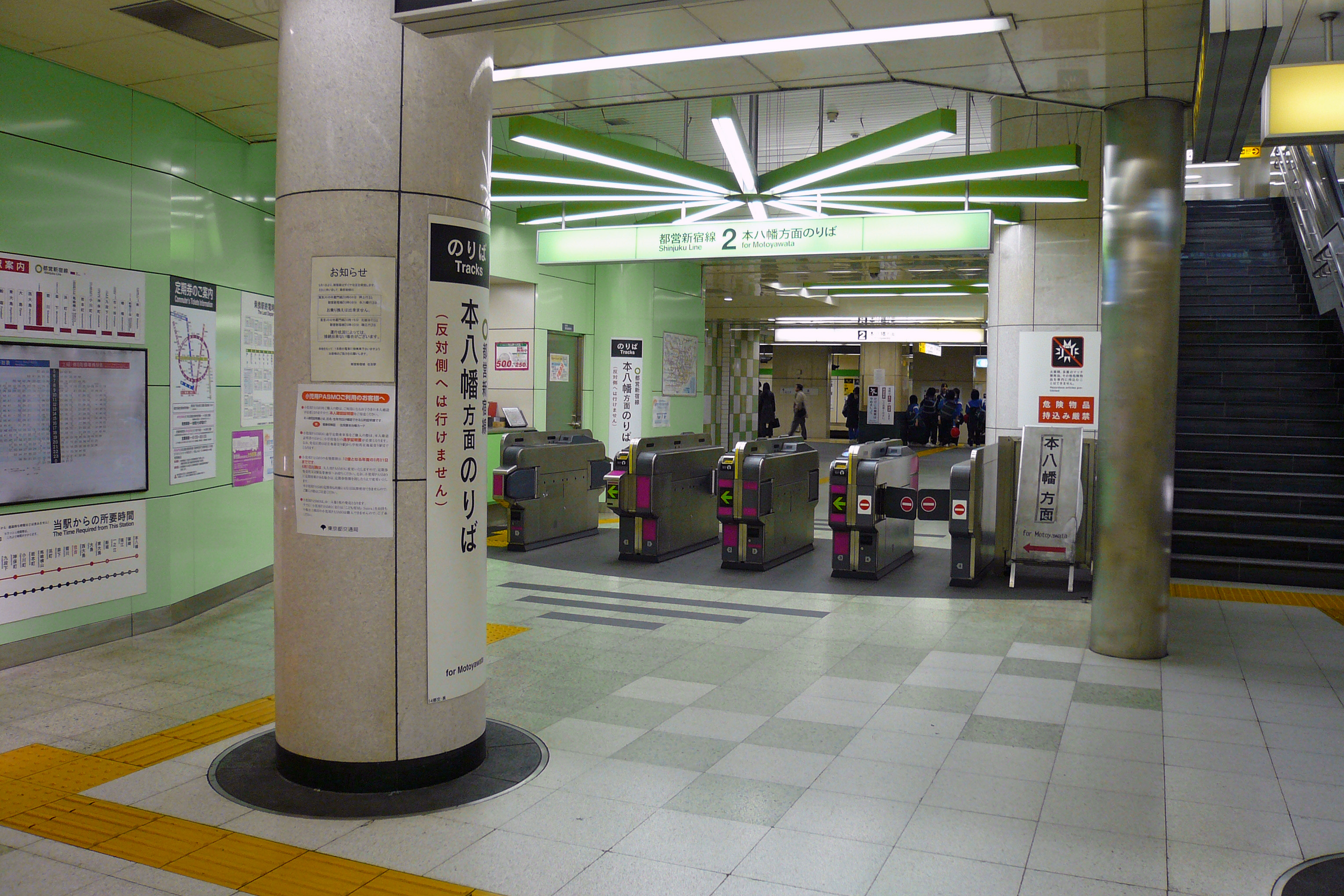
The Toei Shinjuku Line (platform 2) ticket barriers in March 2007

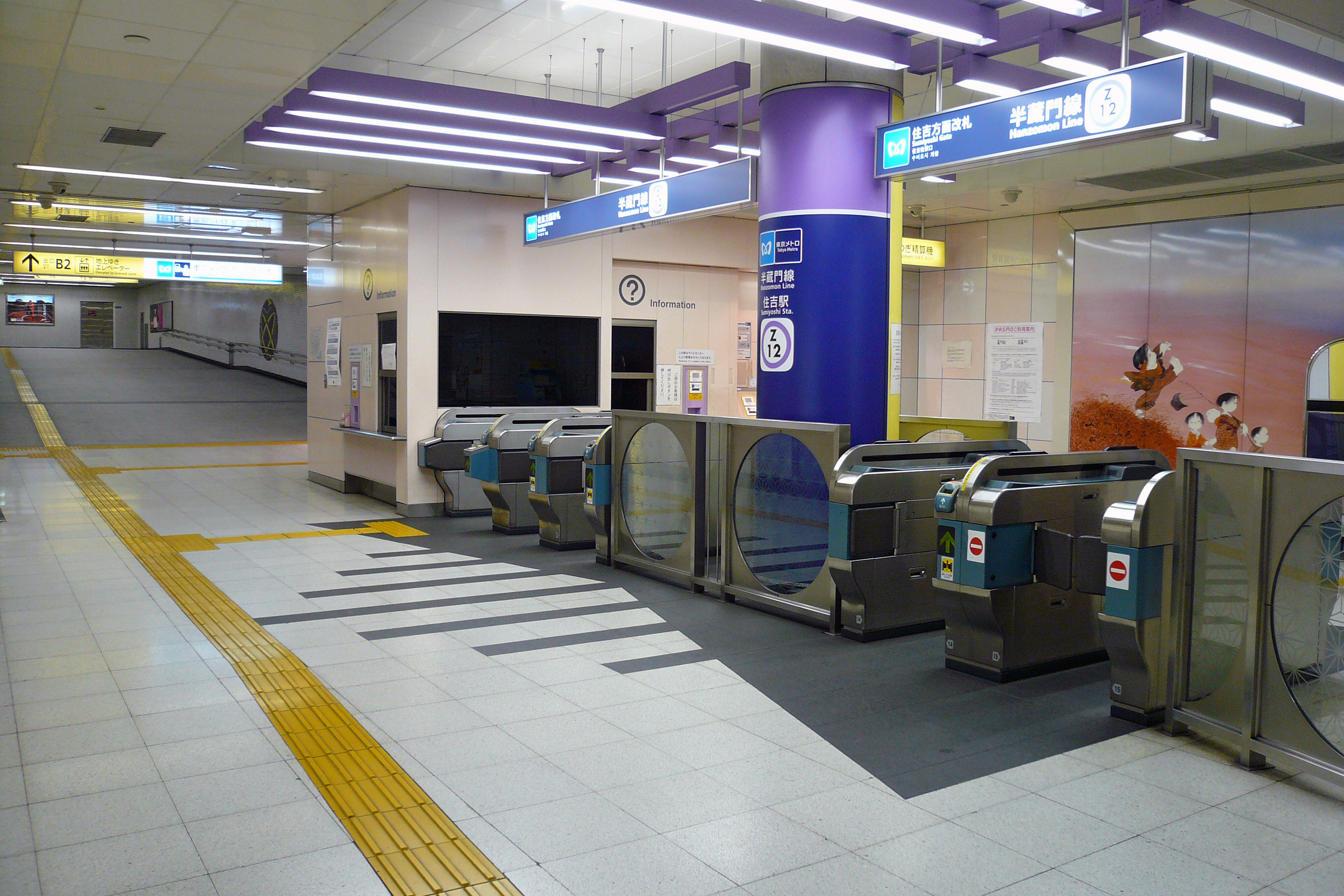
The Tokyo Metro ticket barriers in March 2007

=== Toei platforms ===
Two side platforms serving two tracks. Here, passengers must choose their direction before passing through the ticket gates.

1	Shinjuku Line	for Jimbocho, Ichigaya, and Shinjuku; Keiō Line for Hatsudai, Hatagaya, Meidaimae, Chōfu, and Hashimoto
2	Shinjuku Line	for Ojima and Motoyawata

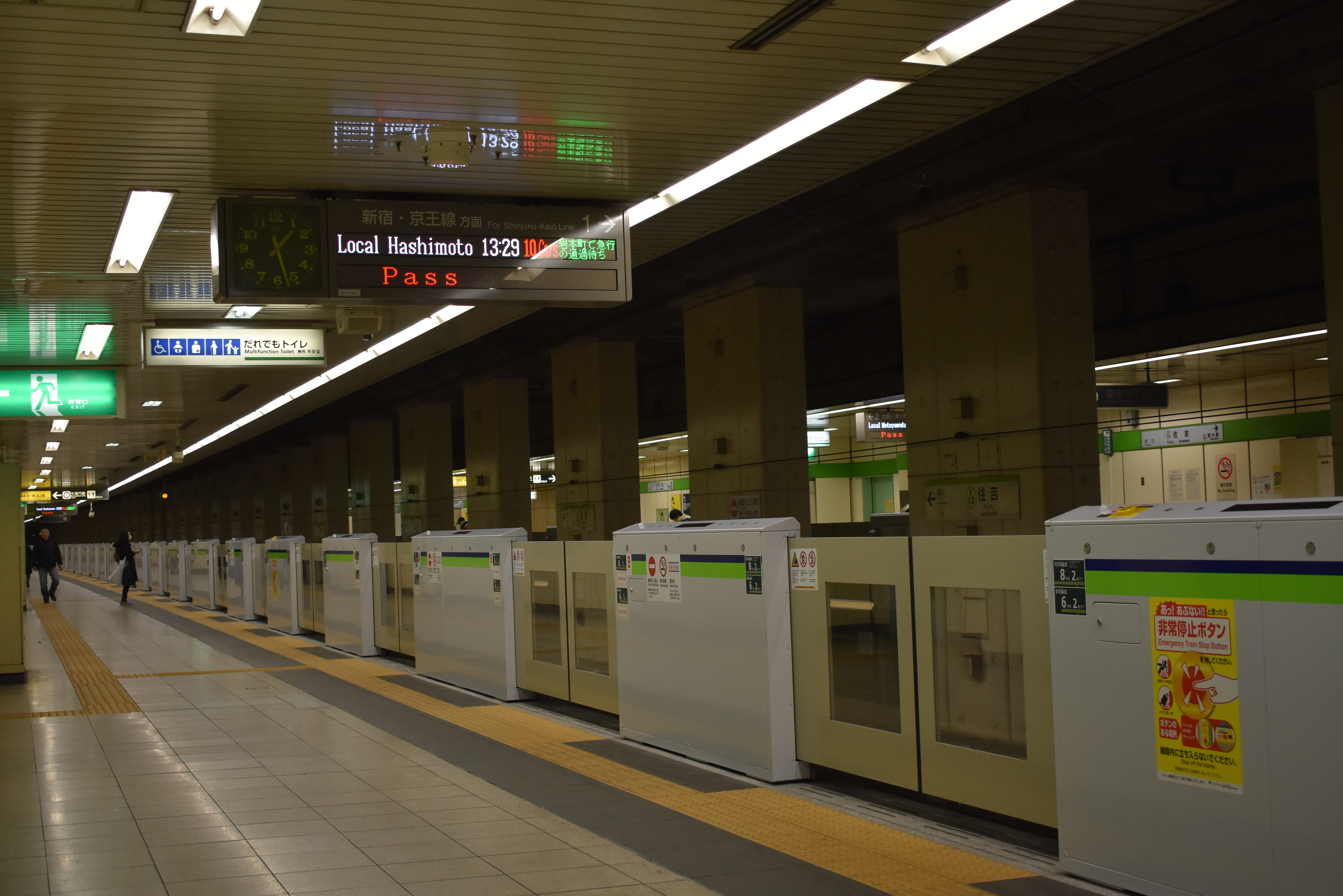
The Toei Shinjuku Line platforms in December 2018

=== Tokyo Metro platforms ===
Originally built as two island platforms, one above the other, but only one side is used, and the other side, originally reserved for future extension plan to Toyosu, are used as stabling tracks.

1	Hanzōmon Line	for Otemachi and Shibuya; Den-en-toshi Line for Chūō-Rinkan
2	Hanzomon Line	for Kinshichō and Oshiage; Tobu Skytree Line for Kita-Koshigaya and Tōbu-Dōbutsu-Kōen; Tobu Isesaki Line for Kuki; Tōbu Nikkō Line for Minami-Kurihashi

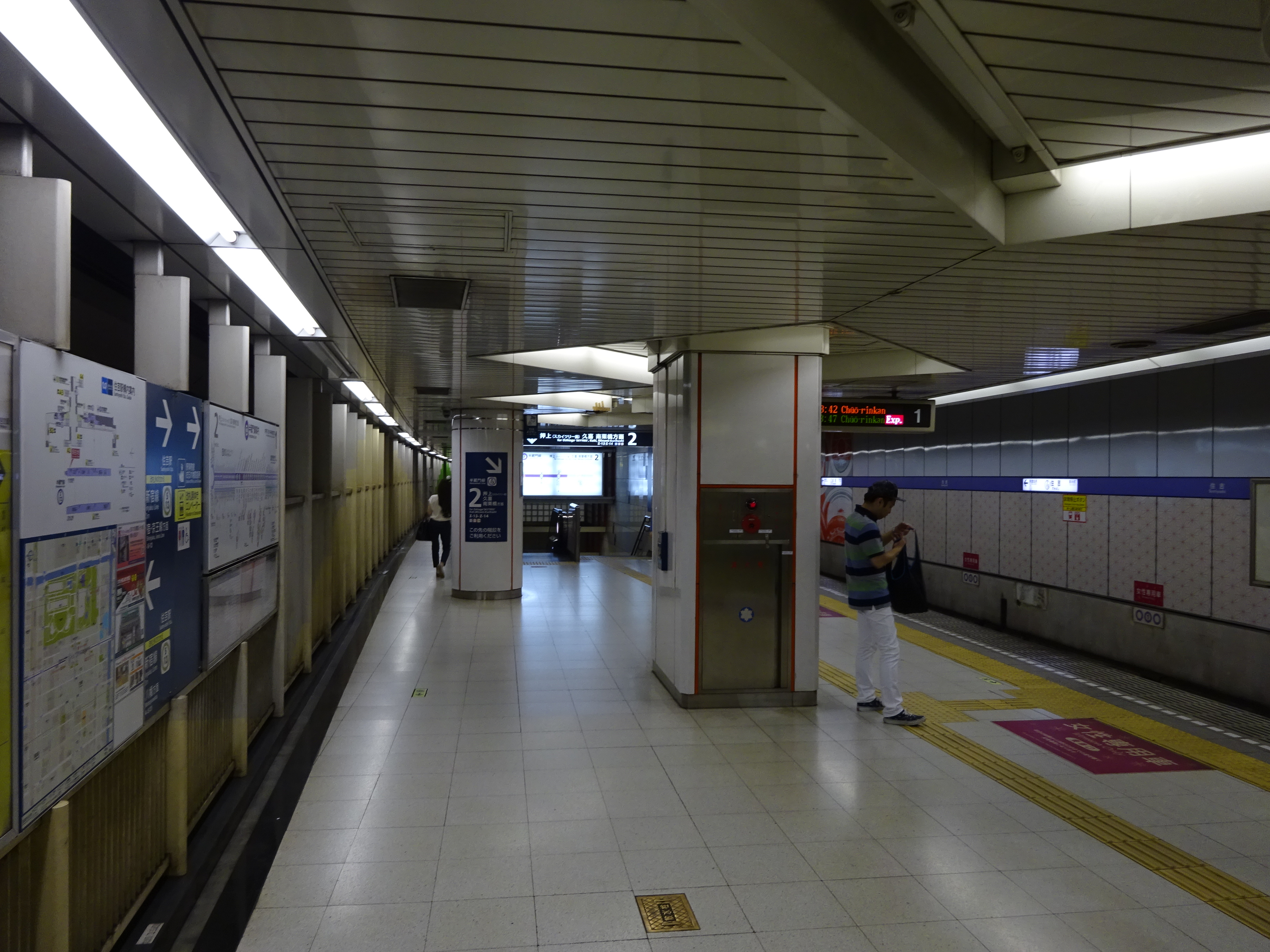
Tokyo Metro Hanzomon Line platform 1 in June 2016. The other side of the platform is covered up with fences and information board.

== History ==
The station opened on 21 December 1978, initially served by the Toei Shinjuku Line only. The Tokyo Metro platforms opened on 19 March 2003.

The station facilities of the Hanzōmon Line were inherited by Tokyo Metro after the privatization of the Teito Rapid Transit Authority (TRTA) in 2004.

== Surrounding area ==
Sumiyoshi Station is located about 15 minutes' walk away from Kinshichō Station, one of Kōtō, Tokyo's largest shopping areas and also lies in close proximity to Sarueonshi Park.

== Future developments ==
In 2021, plans were announced to branch the Yurakucho line at Toyosu Station, traveling north for 4.8 km (3.0 mi) connecting up to Sumiyoshi Station. This branch line, expected to be in service in the mid-2030s, will connect Sumiyoshi Station with the region south of it.

A branch line from Toyosu Station has been planned since the early 1980s, heading north via Kameari Station (on the Jōban Line) to Noda in northwest Chiba Prefecture.

== See also ==
- List of railway stations in Japan
