= Kinshichō Station =

Railway and metro station in Tokyo, Japan

Coordinates: 35.696°N 139.814°E

JO22 JB22 Kinshichō Station 錦糸町駅

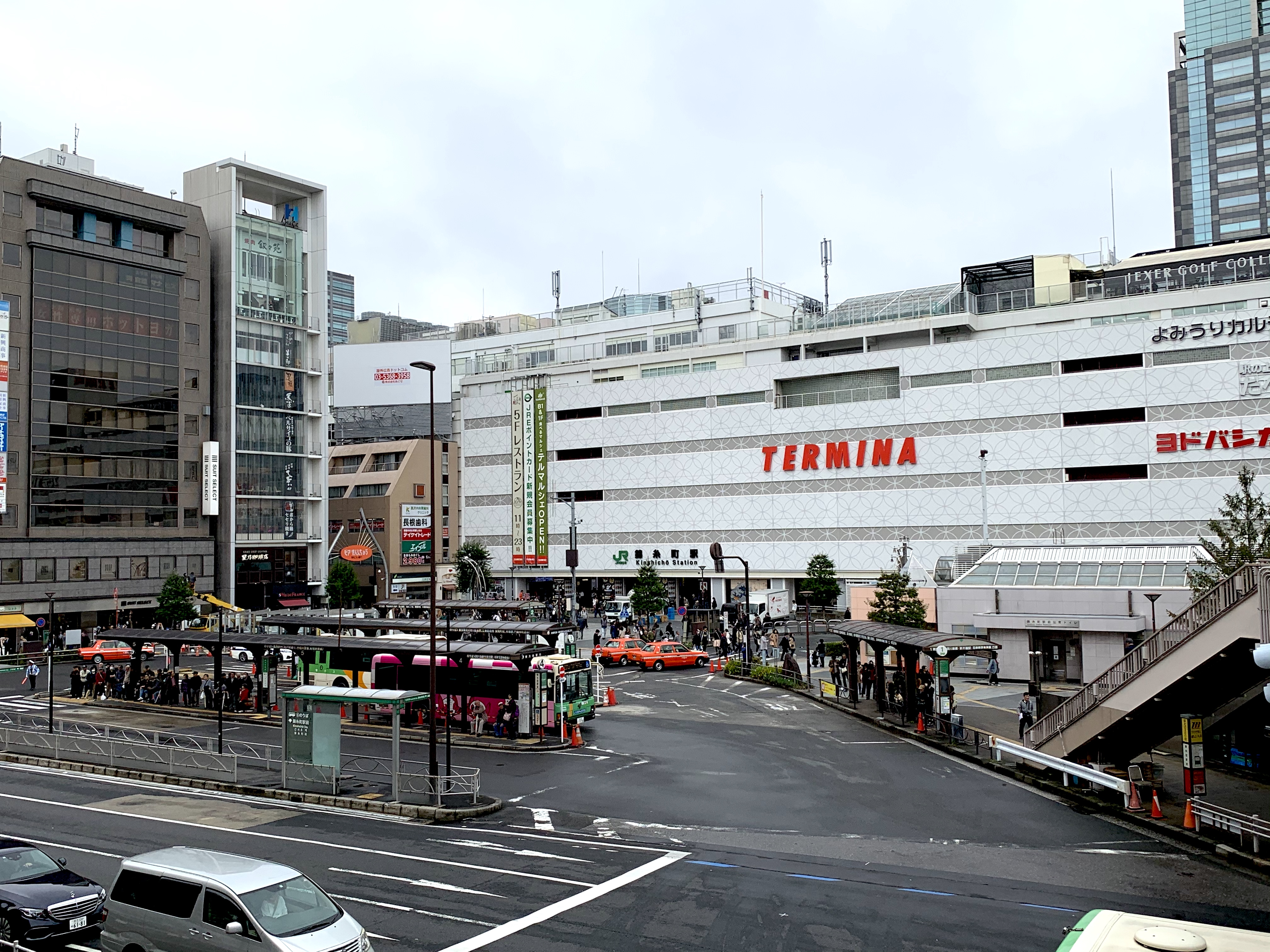

General information
- Location: 3 Kōtōbashi, Sumida, Tokyo （東京都墨田区江東橋3丁目） Japan
- Operator: JR East; Tokyo Metro
- Lines: Sōbu Line (Rapid); Chūō-Sōbu Line; Hanzōmon Line
- Connections: Bus stop

Other information
- Station code: JO22 (Sōbu Line (Rapid)); JB22 (Chūō-Sōbu Line); Z-13 (Hanzōmon Line)

History
- Opened: 9 December 1894; 131 years ago

Passengers
- JR East, FY2013: 103,522 daily
Services
Preceding station	JR East	Following station
Shinjuku towards Hakuba	Azusa	Funabashi JO25 towards Chiba
Shinjuku towards Ōtsuki	Fuji Excursion	Funabashi One-way operation
Tokyo Terminus	Shiosai	Funabashi JO25 (limited service) towards Chōshi
Bakurochō JO21 towards Tokyo	Sōbu Line Rapid	Shin-Koiwa JO23 towards Chiba
Ryōgoku JB21 towards Mitaka	Chūō–Sōbu Line	Kameido JB23 towards Chiba
Preceding station	Tokyo Metro	Following station
Sumiyoshi towards Shibuya	Hanzōmon Line	Oshiage Terminus
Location
- Location within Special wards of Tokyo Location within Tokyo Bay and Bōsō Peninsula Location within Tokyo Location within Japan

Kinshichō Station (錦糸町駅, Kinshichō-eki) is a railway station in Sumida, Tokyo, Japan, operated by East Japan Railway Company (JR East) and Tokyo Metro.

The surrounding area is the largest shopping district in Sumida Ward, featuring several large department stores such as Termina Shopping Mall which houses numerous small shops and restaurants.

== Lines ==
Kinshichō Station is served by the JR East Sōbu Line (Rapid) and Chūō-Sōbu Line, as well as the Tokyo Metro Hanzōmon Line (Station number Z-13).

== Station layout ==
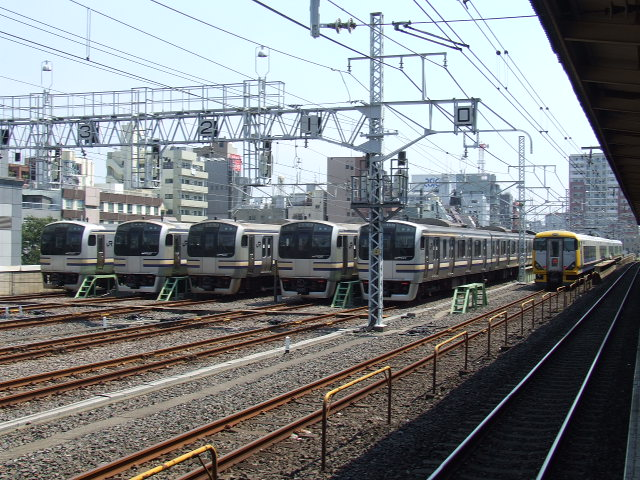
JR Sōbu Line trains stabled next to the station platforms during the daytime, August 2007

=== JR East platforms ===
1	Chūō-Sōbu Line	for Akihabara, Shinjuku, Nakano, and Mitaka
2	Chūō-Sōbu Line	for Shin-Koiwa, Funabashi, Tsudanuma, and Chiba
3	Sōbu Line (Rapid)	for Tokyo; Yokosuka Line for Yokohama, and Kamakura
4	Sōbu Line (Rapid)	for Chiba, Narita, Kazusa-Ichinomiya, and Kisarazu

=== Tokyo Metro platforms ===
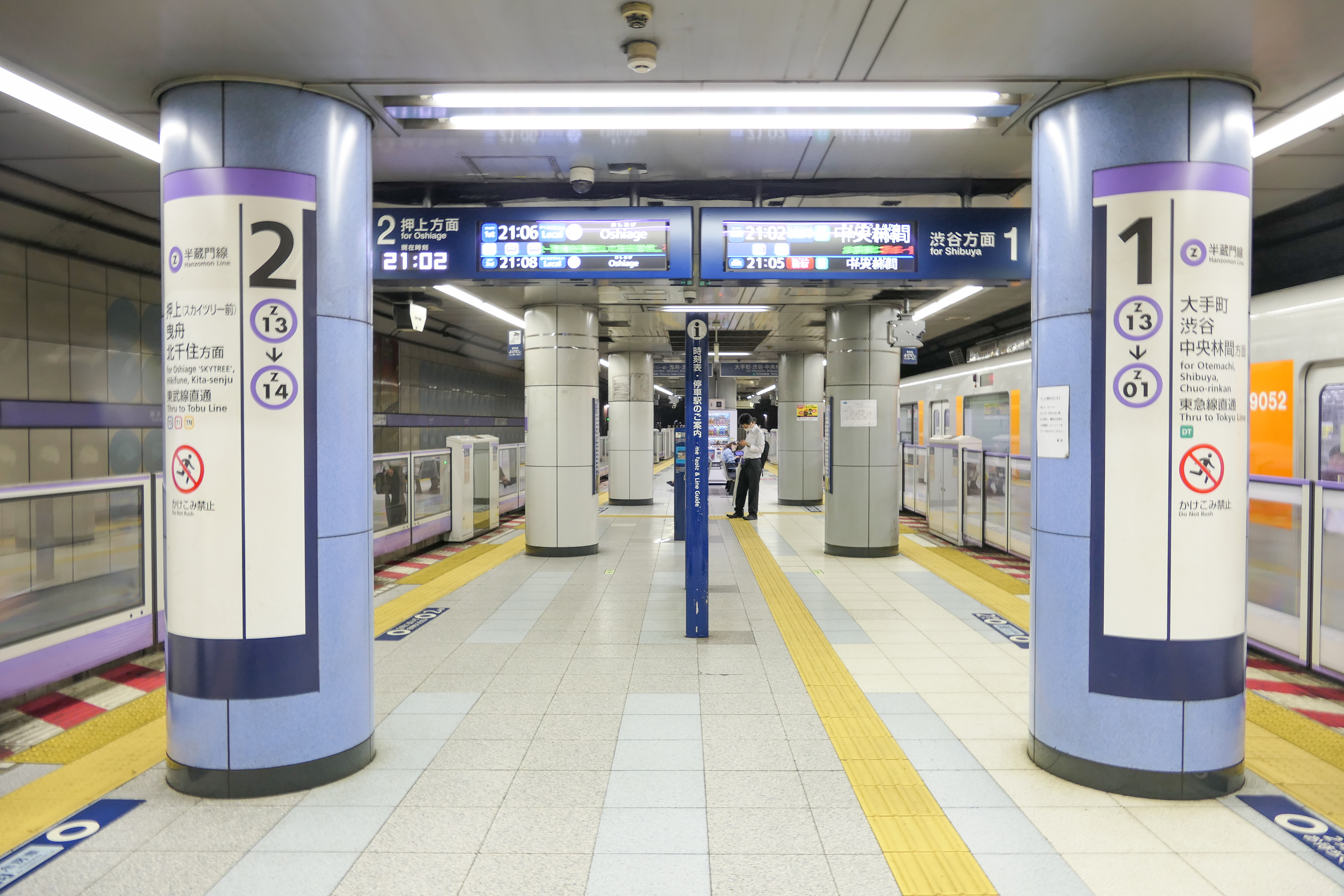
Hanzōmon Line underground platforms, June 2023

1	Hanzōmon Line	for Otemachi and Shibuya; Den-en-toshi Line for Chūō-Rinkan
2	Hanzōmon Line	for Oshiage; Tobu Skytree Line for Tōbu-Dōbutsu-Kōen; Tobu Isesaki Line for Kuki; Tōbu Nikkō Line for Minami-Kurihashi

== History ==
The station first opened on 9 December 1894. The Hanzōmon Line station was opened on 19 March 2003 by the Teito Rapid Transit Authority (TRTA).

The station facilities of the Hanzōmon Line were inherited by Tokyo Metro after the privatization of the Teito Rapid Transit Authority (TRTA) in 2004. This station was one of the more popular spots in Tokyo for people to gather and play the mobile game Pokémon Go when it was first released in August 2016.

== Passenger statistics ==
In fiscal 2013, the JR East station was used by 103,522 passengers daily (boarding passengers only), making it the 36th-busiest station operated by JR East. In fiscal 2013, the Tokyo Metro station was used by an average of 92,658 passengers per day (exiting and entering passengers), making it the 41st-busiest station operated by Tokyo Metro. The daily passenger figures for each operator in previous years are as shown below.

Fiscal year	JR East	Tokyo Metro
1999	83,336	
2000	85,652	
2005	89,700	
2010	99,032	
2011	99,167	82,342
2012	101,250	89,233
2013	103,522	92,658
2020	74,343 (Note: Represents a significant ridership decrease owing to the impact of the COVID-19 pandemic on public transport.)	74,337

- Note that JR East figures are for boarding passengers only.

In the 2015 data available from Japan's Ministry of Land, Infrastructure, Transport and Tourism, Kinshicho → Ryōgoku was one of the train segments among Tokyo's most crowded train lines during rush hour.

== Surrounding area ==
- Kinshi Park
- Sumida Triphony Hall (concert hall)

== See also ==
- List of railway stations in Japan
