= Ichikawa Station =

Railway station in Ichikawa, Chiba Prefecture, Japan

JO24 JB27 Ichikawa Station 市川駅
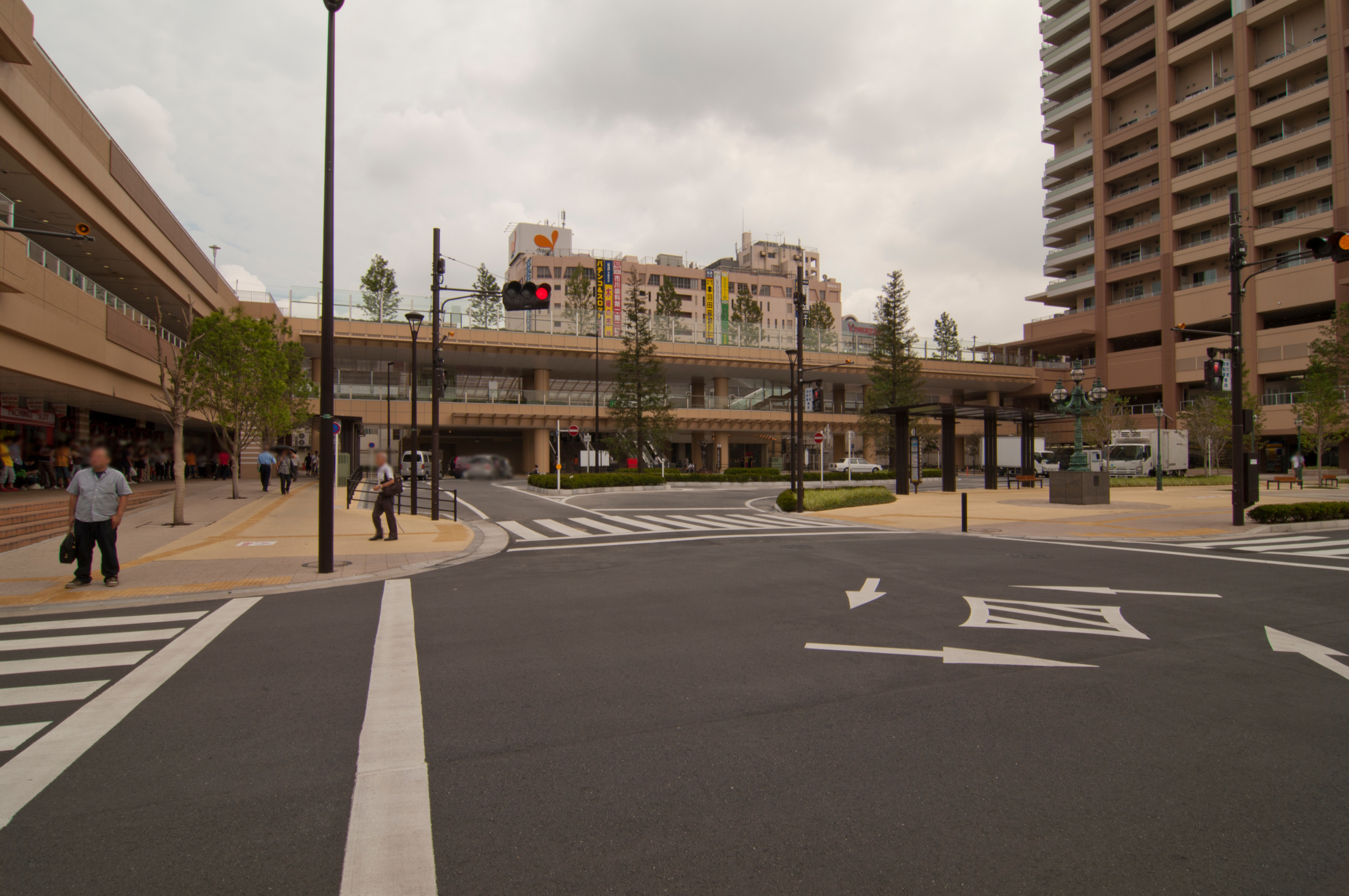
- The south entrance and station forecourt, July 2010

General information
- Location: 1 Ichikawa, Ichikawa-shi, Chiba-ken 272-0034; Japan
- Coordinates: 35°43′44.86″N 139°54′27.72″E
- Operator: JR East
- Lines: Sōbu Line (Rapid); Chūō-Sōbu Line
- Distance: 15.4 km from Tokyo
- Platforms: 2 island platforms
- Connections: Bus stop

Other information
- Status: Staffed ("Midori no Madoguchi" )
- Station code: JO24 (Sōbu Line (Rapid)); JB27 (Chūō-Sōbu Line)
- Website: Official website

History
- Opened: 20 July 1894

Passengers
- FY2019: 61,575daily

Services
Preceding station	JR East	Following station
Shin-Koiwa JO23 towards Tokyo	Sōbu Line Rapid	Funabashi JO25 towards Chiba
Koiwa JB26 towards Mitaka	Chūō–Sōbu Line	Moto-Yawata JB28 towards Chiba
Location
- Location within Chiba Prefecture Location within Japan

Ichikawa Station (市川駅, Ichikawa-eki) is a junction passenger railway station in the city of Ichikawa, Chiba, Japan, operated by East Japan Railway Company (JR East).

== Lines ==
Ichikawa Station is served by the Sōbu Line (Rapid) and all-stations Chūō-Sōbu Line services, and is located 15.4 kilometers from the western terminus of both lines at Tokyo Station.

== Station layout ==
The station consists of two elevated island platforms serving four tracks, with additional passing tracks on either side of the Sōbu Line (Rapid) tracks for non-stop (limited express and commuter rapid) services. The station has a Midori no Madoguchi staffed ticket office. The "Shapo" shopping building adjoins the station.

=== Platforms ===
1	Chūō-Sōbu Line	for Kinshichō, Akihabara, and Shinjuku
2	Chūō-Sōbu Line	for Nishi-Funabashi, Tsudanuma, and Chiba
3	Sōbu Line (Rapid)	for Kinshichō, Tokyo; Yokosuka Line for Yokohama
4	Sōbu Line (Rapid)	for Funabashi, Chiba, Narita, Kisarazu, and Kazusa-Ichinomiya

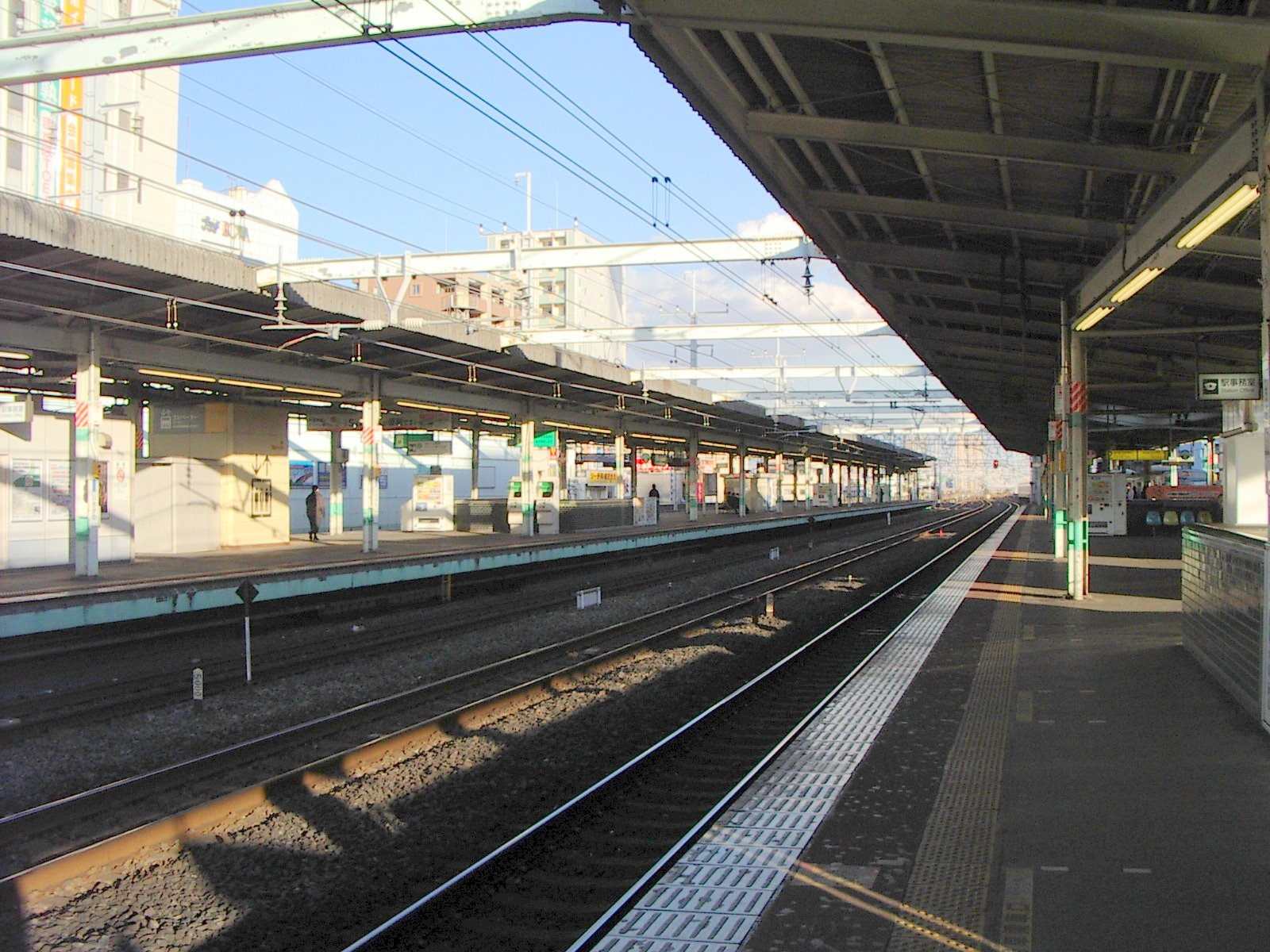
View from the Chūō-Sōbu Line platform, with the Sōbu Line (Rapid) platform on the left, March 2007

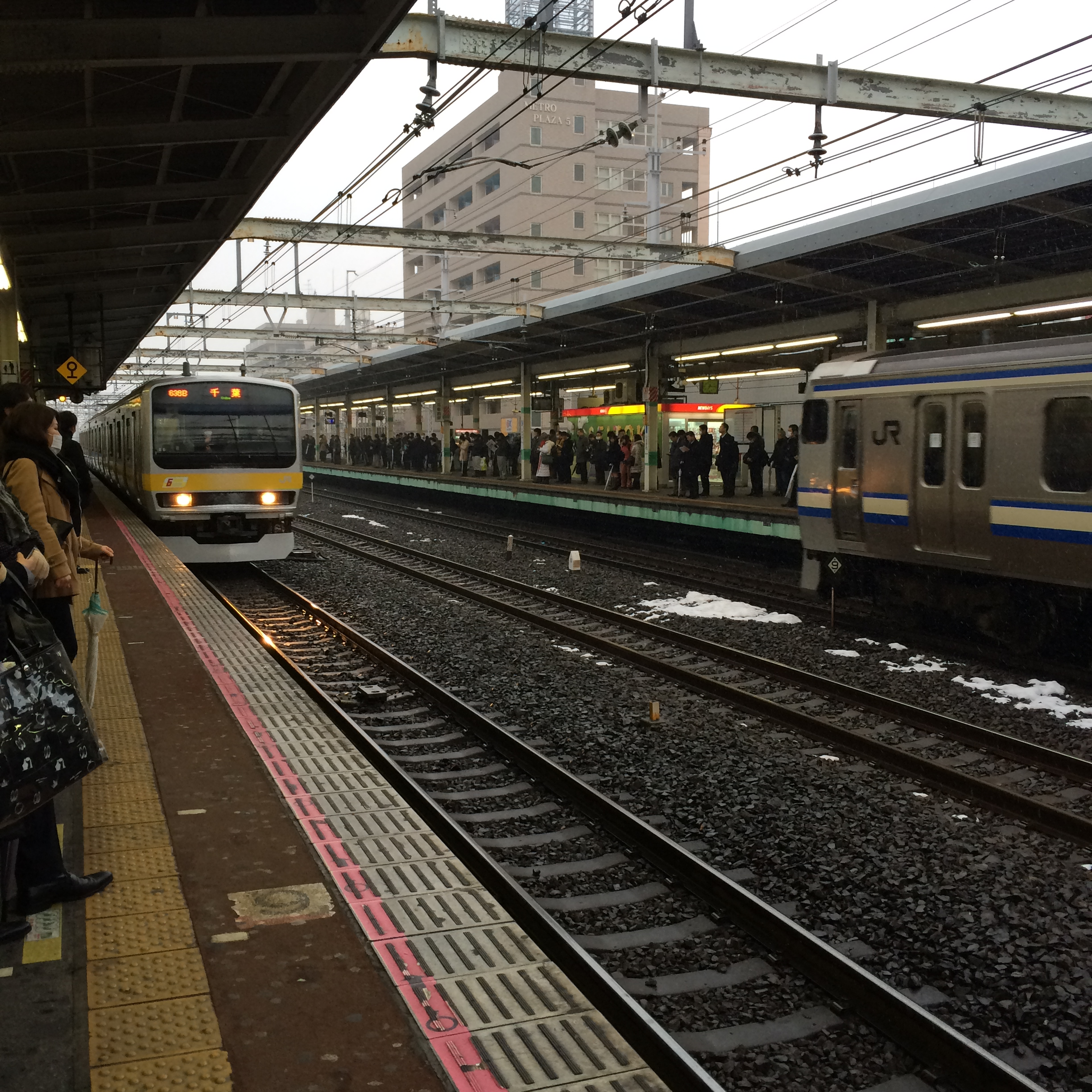
The platforms in February 2014

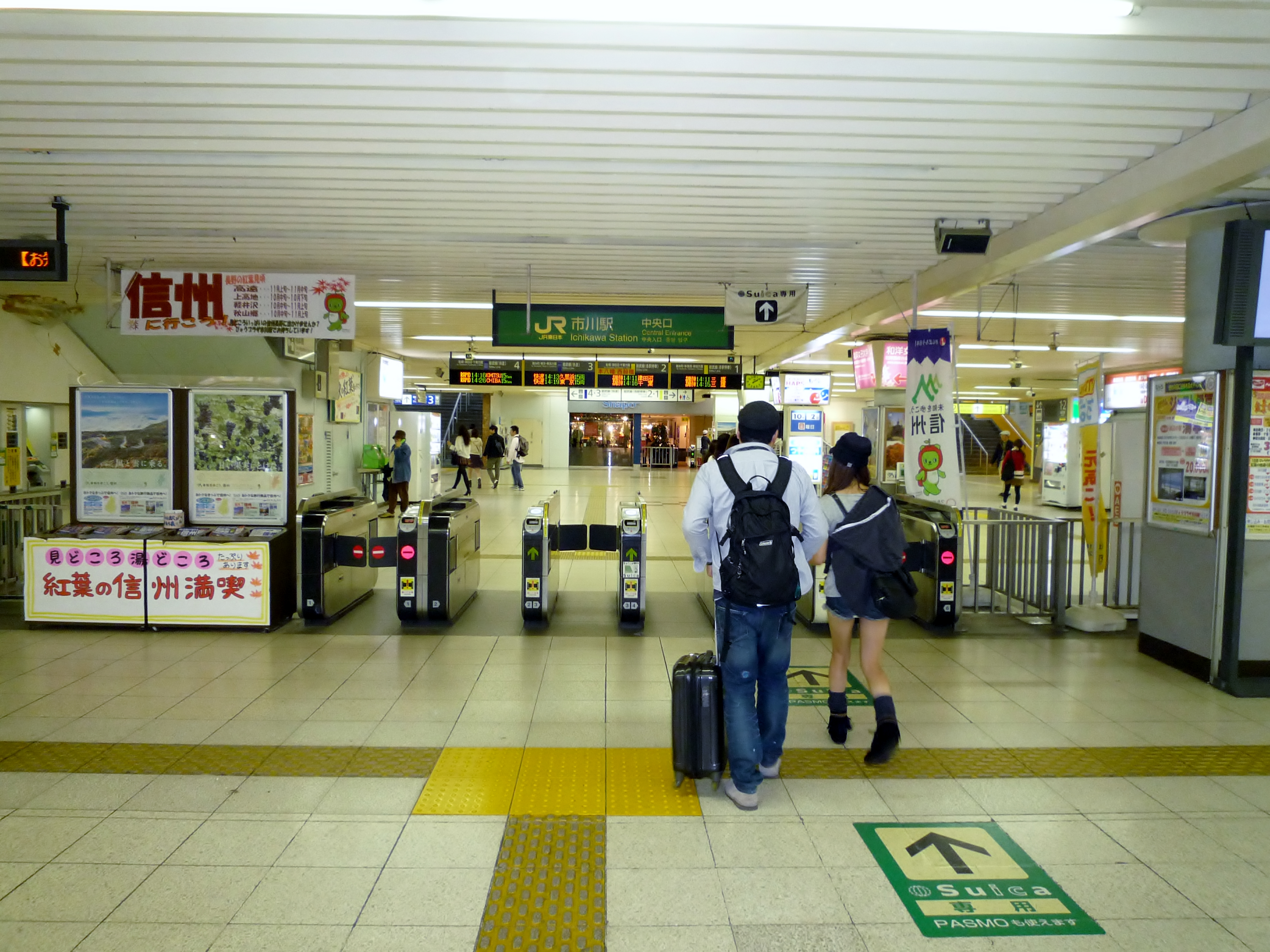
The ticket barriers, October 2011

== History ==
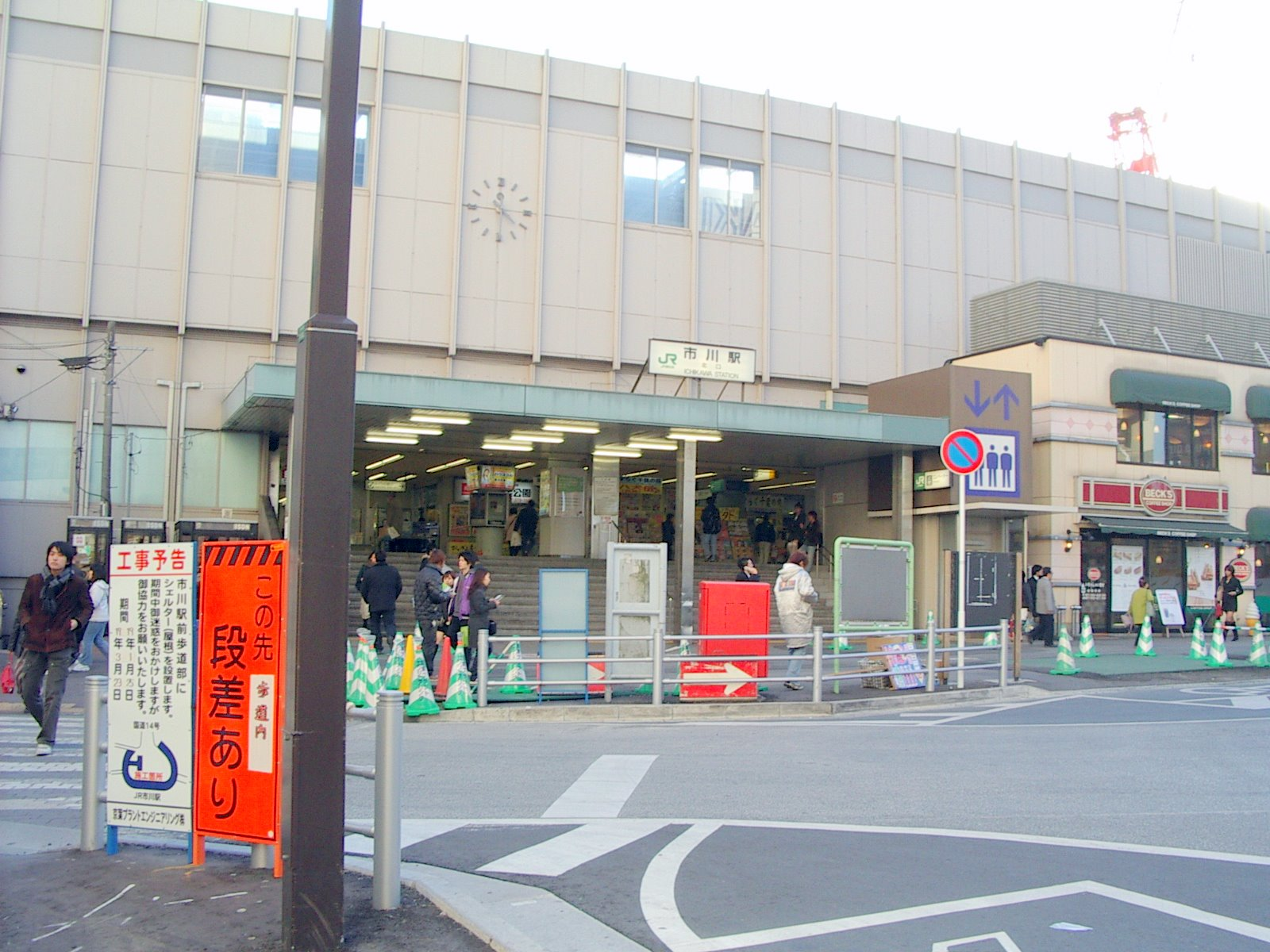
The north entrance in March 2007, before addition of an overhanging roof

The station opened on 20 July 1894. With the privatization of JNR on 1 April 1987, the station came under the control of JR East.

== Passenger statistics ==
In fiscal 2019, the station was used by an average of 61,575 passengers daily (boarding passengers only). The passenger figures for previous years are as shown below.

Fiscal year	Daily average
2000	56,955
2005	57,349
2010	58,979
2015	59,909

== Surrounding area ==
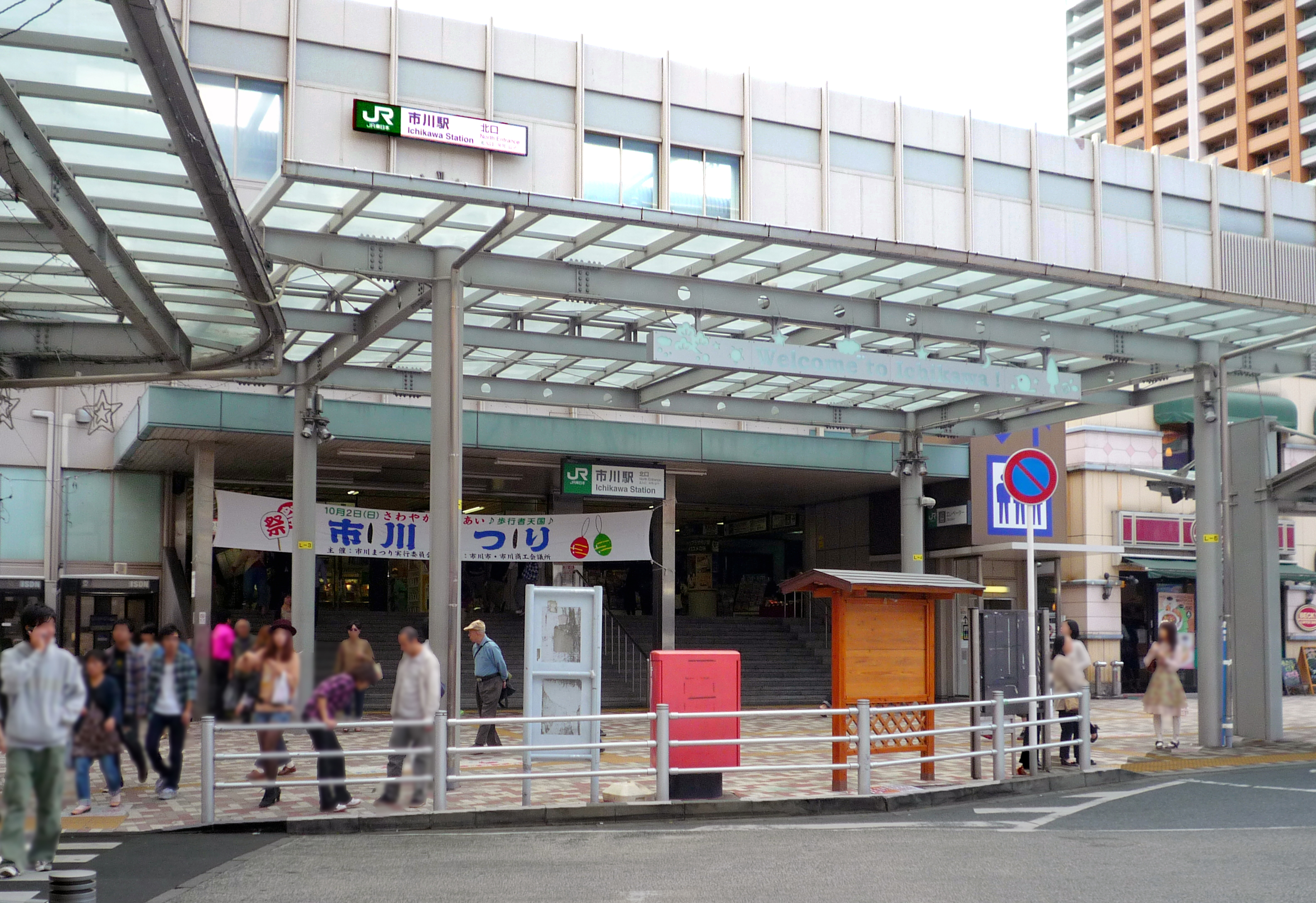
The north entrance, October 2011

- Ichikawamama Station (on the Keisei Main Line, approximate 500 m away)
- Chiba University of Commerce
- Wayo Women's University
- Konodai Girls' School
- Edo River
- National Route 14

== Bus services ==
Bus stops are located on the north and south sides of the station, served by Keisei Bus. As of January 2015, the following bus services are available from Ichikawa Station.

NORTH EXIT
Keisei Bus

Service No.	Destination
松11	Matsudo Station via Konodai Station
市41・42, 市45	Higashi-Matsudo Station
松51, 松54・55, 市43・44	Matsudo Station via Horinouchi, Kita-Kokubun Station, Seitoku Gakuen
市81・82 (Part services are express)	Kita-Kokubun Station via Konodai Station
市61, 市62, 市63	Motoyawata Station

SOUTH EXIT
Keisei Transit Bus

Service No.	Destination
市川01	Motoyawata Station
市川02 (midnight bus)	Gyotoku Station
市川03	Nishi-Funabashi Station
Airport bus	Haneda Airport

== See also ==
- List of railway stations in Japan
