= Edogawa Station =

Railway station in Tokyo, Japan

Coordinates: 35.73771°N 139.896243°E

KS12 Edogawa Station 江戸川駅
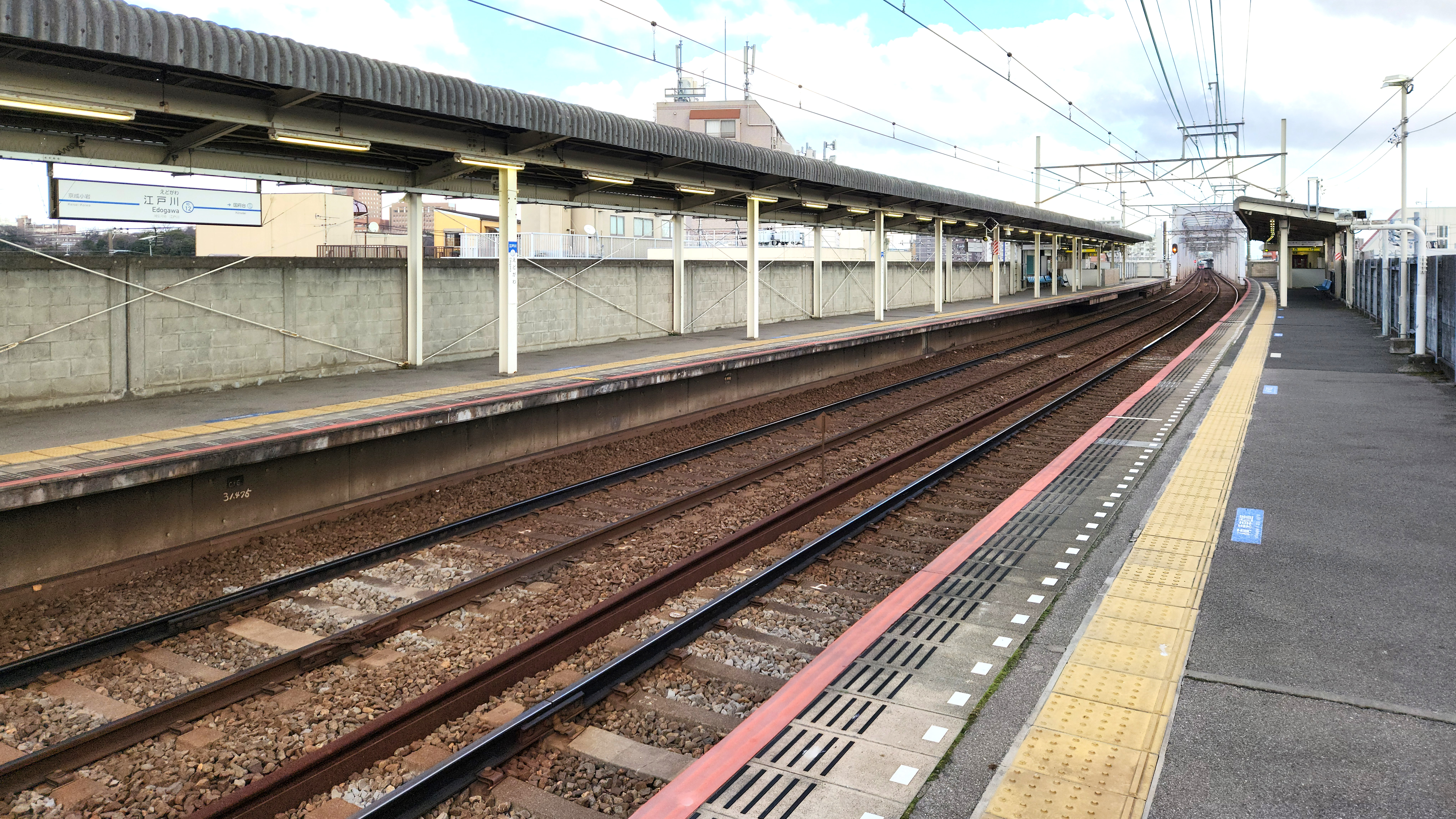
- Platforms of Edogawa Station in January 2026

General information
- Location: 3-24-15 Kita-Koiwa, Edogawa, Tokyo; Japan
- Operator: Keisei Electric Railway
- Line: Keisei Main Line

Other information
- Station code: KS12

History
- Opened: November 3, 1912

Passengers
- FY2015: 5,348 daily

Services
Preceding station	Keisei	Following station
Keisei Koiwa KS11 towards Keisei Ueno	Main Line Local	Kōnodai KS13 towards Narita Airport Terminal 1
Location

Edogawa Station (江戸川駅, Edogawa-eki) is a railway station located in Edogawa, Tokyo, Japan. It is on the Keisei Electric Railway Main Line.

== Layout ==
This station consists of two side platforms serving two tracks.

1	Keisei Main Line	for Keisei-Takasago, Nippori, and Keisei Ueno
2	Keisei Main Line	for Keisei Yawata, Keisei Funabashi, Keisei Chiba, and Keisei Narita

== Traffic ==
Average passenger ride per day (by year)
Year	Alighting/Departing)	Daily Average	Source
1990		2,882	
1991		2,984	
1992		2,951	(Note: 東京都統計年鑑（平成4年）)
1993		2,964	(Note: 東京都統計年鑑（平成5年）)
1994		3,011	(Note: 東京都統計年鑑（平成6年）)
1995		3,172	(Note: 東京都統計年鑑（平成7年）)
1996		3,205	(Note: 東京都統計年鑑（平成8年）)
1997		3,016	
1998		2,792	(Note: 東京都統計年鑑（平成10年）)
1999		2,738	(Note: 東京都統計年鑑（平成11年）)
2000		2,707	(Note: 東京都統計年鑑（平成12年）)
2001		2,660	(Note: 東京都統計年鑑（平成13年）)
2002	5,293	2,586	(Note: 東京都統計年鑑（平成14年）)
2003	5,325	2,642	(Note: 東京都統計年鑑（平成15年）)
2004	5,203	2,633	(Note: 東京都統計年鑑（平成16年）)
2005	5,317	2,693	(Note: 東京都統計年鑑（平成17年）)
2006	5,356	2,721	(Note: 東京都統計年鑑（平成18年）)
2007	5,409	2,732	(Note: 東京都統計年鑑（平成19年）)
2008	5,503	2,778	(Note: 東京都統計年鑑（平成20年）)
2009	5,515	2,784	(Note: 東京都統計年鑑（平成21年）)
2010	5,485	2,762	(Note: 東京都統計年鑑（平成22年）)
2011	5,215	2,617	(Note: 東京都統計年鑑（平成23年）)
2012	5,294	2,666	(Note: 東京都統計年鑑（平成24年）)
2013	5,388	2,710	(Note: 東京都統計年鑑（平成25年）)
2014	5,203	2,618	(Note: 東京都統計年鑑（平成26年）)
2015	5,348		

== History ==
- 1912 – The station begins operation as Ichikawa Station
- 1914 – The station is renamed to its current name
- 17 June 2010 - Station numbering was introduced to all Keisei Line stations; Edogawa was assigned station number KS12.
