= Kamei-in =

Buddhist temple

Kamei-in 亀井院
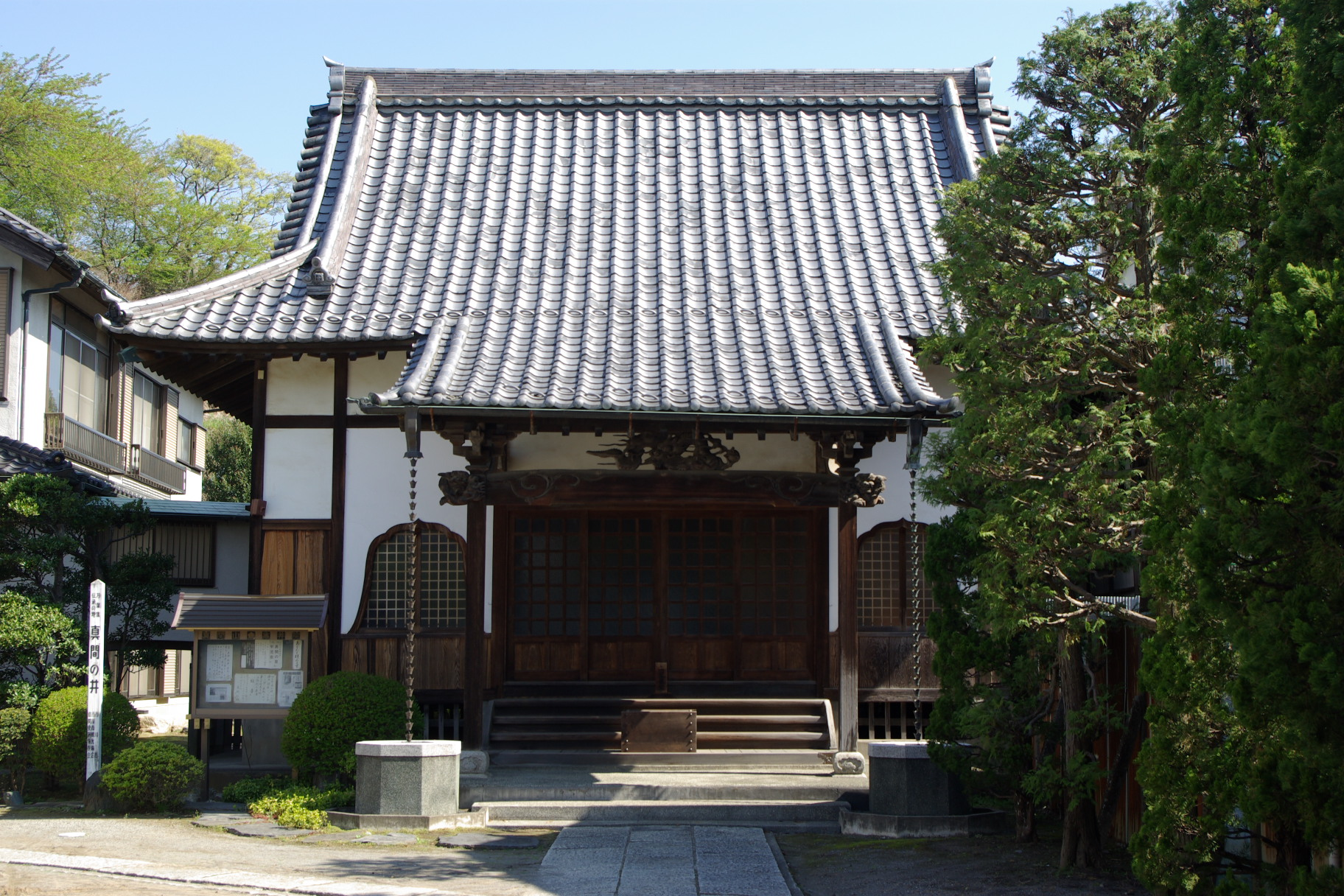
- Kamei-in

Religion
- Affiliation: Buddhism
- Rite: Nichiren-shū

Location
- Location: 4-4-9 Mama, Ichikawa, Chiba Prefecture
- Country: Japan
- Interactive map of Kamei-in 亀井院
- Coordinates: 35°44′19.56″N 139°54′34.45″E

Architecture
- Completed: 1635

Kamei-in (亀井院) is a Buddhist temple located in the city of Ichikawa in Chiba Prefecture. Kamei-in is a Nichiren Buddhist temple noted for the Mama Well.

== History ==
Kamei-in was built early in the Edo period in 1635 as a retirement temple for the 11th abbot of nearby Guhō-ji. Kamei-in is located directly to the southeast of the Guhō-ji, and remains a sub-temple of it. It was originally called Bin'i-bō. In 1705 an administrator from the Tokugawa shogunate, Nagayori Suzuki, began a restoration of Kame-in using stones from Nikkō Tōshō-gū, in Nikkō, Tochigi Prefecture. The stones were used to build the steps of Kamei-in. Suzuki was censured by the shogunate and committed seppuku over the incident. During this period the temple came to be known as Suzuki-in, but after Nagayori's death the name fell out of use. After the appearance of a mysterious turtle at Kamei-in, the temple came to be known by its current name, a combination of the kanji for turtle (亀) and well (井). Noted early 20th century tanka poet Hakushū Kitahara (1885 – 1942) lived in the monk's quarters of Kamei-in in 1916.

== Mama Well ==
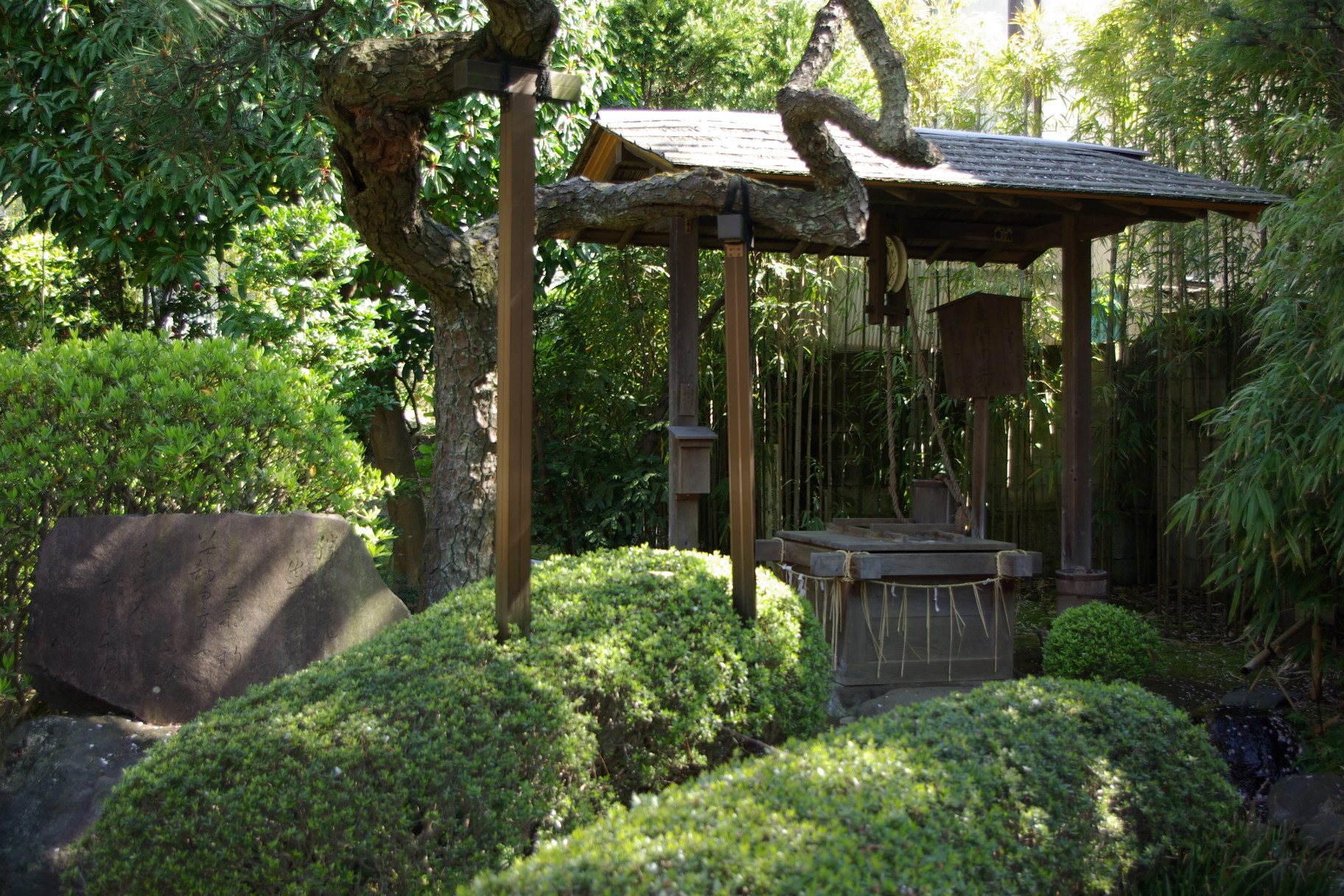
Mama Well at Kamei-in

The Mama Well of Kamei-in is referenced in a poem in the Man'yōshū. Takahashi Mushimaro, a low-ranking court official of the Nara period, wrote in the early 8th century poem On the maiden of Mama of Katsushika:

When I see the well at Mama of Katsushika,
It reminds me of Tekona
Who stood here oft, drawing water.

== Related places ==
- Guhō-ji
- Kamei-in faces the Monument and Shrine of Tekona, a temple featured in Hiroshige's One Hundred Famous Views of Edo

== Transportation ==
Kamei-in is located in the Mama District of Ichikawa. It is accessible by foot from the Kōnodai Station on Keisei Electric Railway's Keisei Main Line.
