= Futamatashimmachi Station =

Railway station in Ichikawa, Chiba Prefecture, Japan

JE10 Futamatashimmachi Station 二俣新町駅
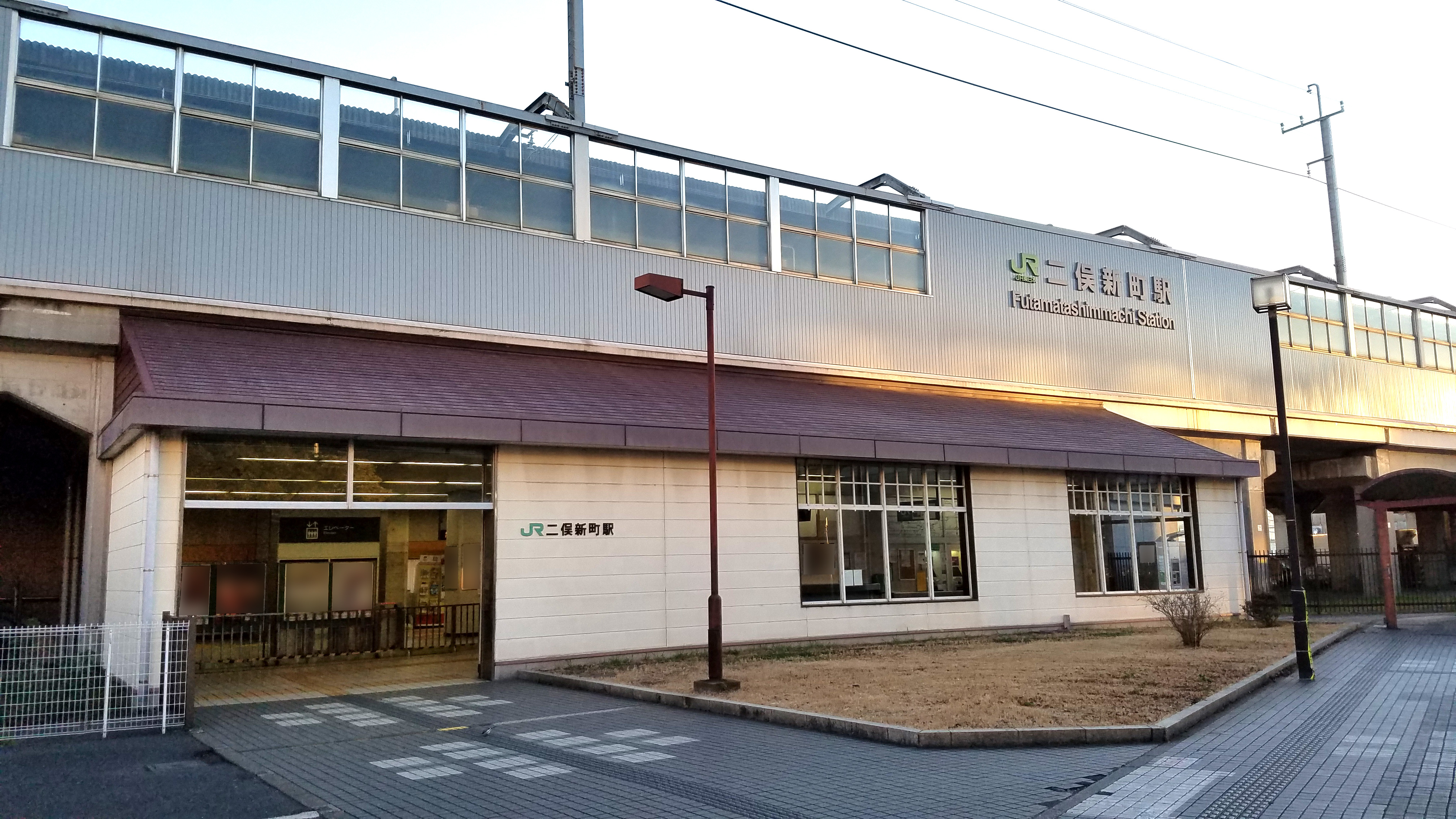
- Futamatashimmachi Station, January 2022

General information
- Location: Futamata-Shimmachi, Ichikawa-shi, Chiba-ken 272-0002; Japan
- Coordinates: 35°41′29.3172″N 139°57′34.6″E
- Operator: JR East
- Line: Keiyō Line
- Distance: 22.6 km from Tokyo
- Platforms: 1 island platform
- Tracks: 2
- Connections: Bus stop

Construction
- Structure type: Elevated
- Accessible: Yes

Other information
- Status: Staffed
- Station code: JE10
- Website: Website

History
- Opened: 1 December 1988

Passengers
- FY2019: 4,983 daily

Services
Preceding station	JR East	Following station
Ichikawashiohama JE09 towards Tokyo	Keiyō Line Local	Minami-Funabashi JE11 towards Soga
Location
- Location within Tokyo Keiyo area Location within Chiba Prefecture Location within Japan

Futamatashimmachi Station (二俣新町駅, Futamata-Shinmachi-eki) is a passenger railway station in the city of Ichikawa, Chiba, Japan, operated by East Japan Railway Company (JR East).

== Lines and services ==
Futamatashimmachi Station is served by the Keiyō Line between Tokyo and Soga, and is located 22.6 km from the western terminus of the line at Tokyo Station. Located on the south side of the triangle formed by the Keiyō Line and Musashino Line, this station is not served by Musashino Line through services.

== Station layout ==
Track layout around Futamatashimmachi Station, showing the Musashino Line wye around the station

The elevated station consists of a single island platform serving two tracks. Two branches of the Musashino Line form a wye around the station, but do not serve it.

=== Platforms ===
1	Keiyō Line	for Kaihimmakuhari and Soga
2	Keiyō Line	for Maihama, Shin-Kiba, and Tokyo

== History ==
The station opened on 1 December 1988.

Station numbering was introduced in 2016 with Futamatashimmachi being assigned station number JE10.

== Passenger statistics ==
In fiscal 2019, the station was used by an average of 4,983 passengers daily (boarding passengers only). It is significantly less used than its neighboring stations due to its inconvenient location near a highway interchange; for comparison, Minami-Funabashi Station to its east was used by an average of 22,763 passengers daily.

The passenger figures for previous years are as shown below.

Fiscal year	Daily average
2000	4,617
2005	4,676
2010	5,119
2015	4,897

== Surrounding area ==
- Tokyo Management College
- National Route 357
- Ichikawaminami High School
- Kohya Junior High School

== See also ==
- List of railway stations in Japan
