= Sugano Station =

Railway station in Ichikawa, Chiba Prefecture, Japan

KS15 Sugano Station 菅野駅
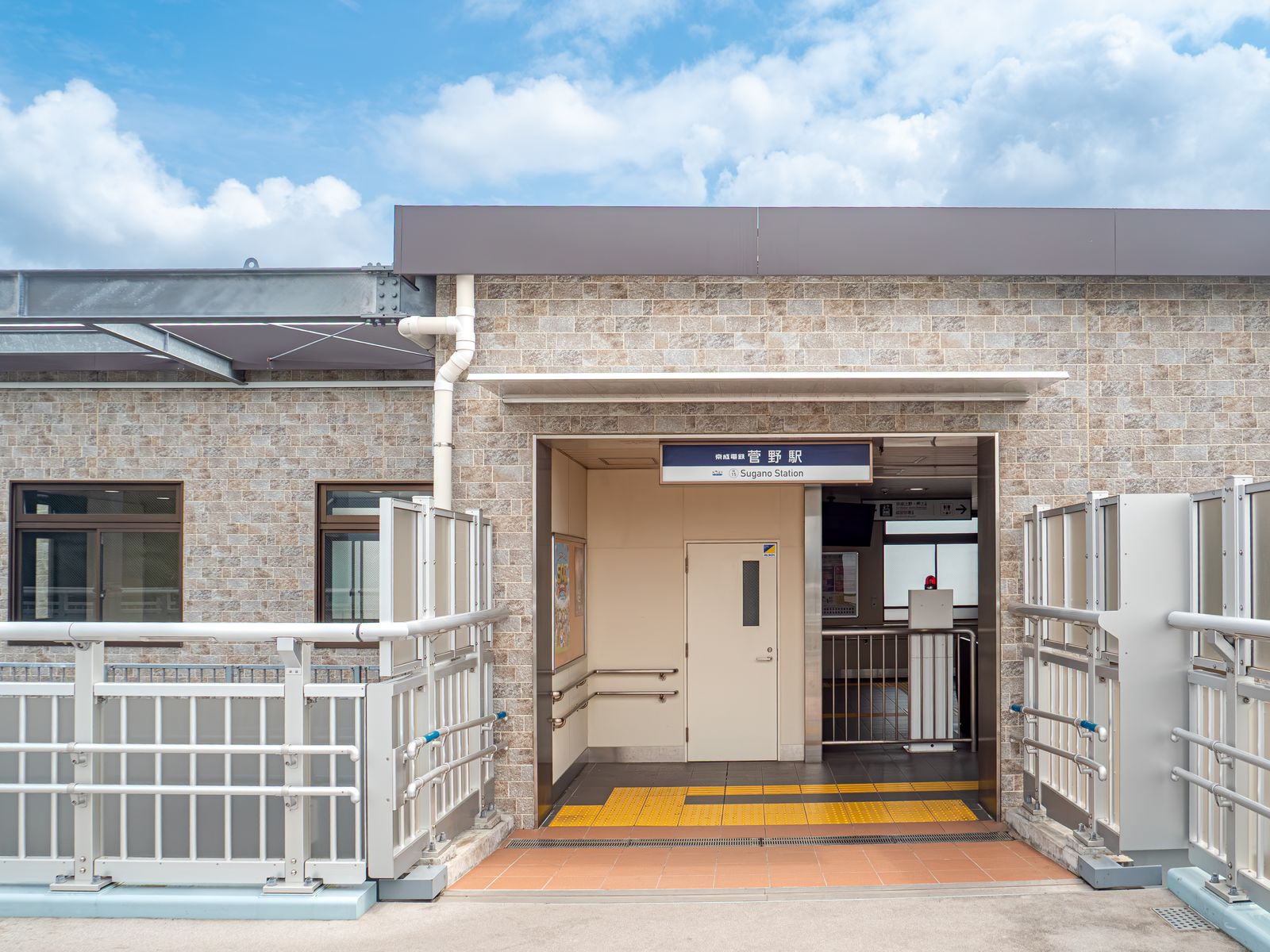
- Sugano Station

General information
- Location: 2-7-1 Sugano, Ichikawa-shi, Chiba-ken 272-0824; Japan
- Coordinates: 35.7281°N 139.9196°E
- Operator: Keisei Electric Railway
- Line: Keisei Main Line
- Distance: 18.2 from Keisei-Ueno
- Platforms: 1 island platform

Other information
- Station code: KS15
- Website: Official website

History
- Opened: February 9, 1916

Passengers
- FY2019: 4195

Services
Preceding station	Keisei	Following station
Ichikawamama KS14 towards Keisei Ueno	Main Line Local	Keisei Yawata KS16 towards Narita Airport Terminal 1
Location
- Location within Chiba Prefecture

Sugano Station (Japanese: 菅野駅, Hepburn: Sugano-eki) is a railway station on the Keisei Main Line in the city of Ichikawa, Chiba Japan, operated by the private railway operator Keisei Electric Railway.

== Lines ==
Sugano Station is served by the Keisei Main Line, and is located 18.2 km from the terminus of the line at Keisei-Ueno Station.

== Station layout ==
The station consists of a single island platform connected via a footbridge to the station building.

=== Platforms ===
1	Keisei Main Line	for Keisei-Takasago, Nippori, and Keisei Ueno
2	Keisei Main Line	for Keisei Tsudanuma, Chiharadai, and Keisei Narita

== History ==
Sugano Station was opened on 9 February 1916.

Station numbering was introduced to all Keisei Line stations on 17 July 2010. Keisei Sekiya was assigned station number KS15.

== Passenger statistics ==
In fiscal 2019, the station was used by an average of 4195 passengers daily.

== Surrounding area ==
- Showagakuin Junior College
- Showa Gakuin Junior and Senior High School
- Showagakuin Elementary School

== See also ==
- List of railway stations in Japan
