= Showagakuin Junior College =

Coordinates: 35°41′55.62″N 139°57′50.93″E

Shōwagakuin Junior College
- 昭和学院短期大学; Shōwa gakuin tanki daigaku
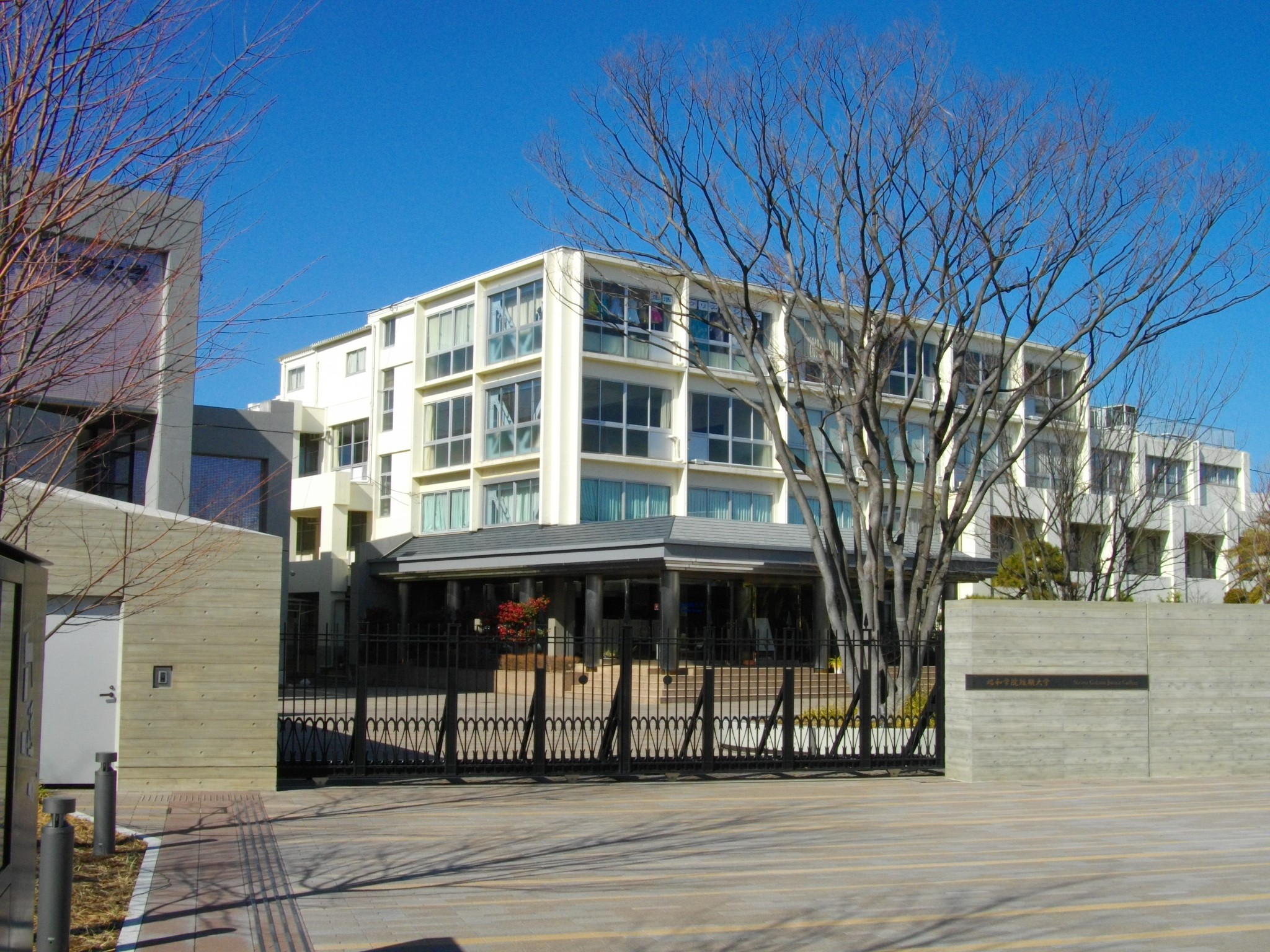
- Type: Private
- Established: 1950
- Location: Ichikawa, Chiba, Japan
- Website: Official website

Shōwagakuin Junior College (昭和学院短期大学, Shōwa gakuin tanki daigaku) is a private junior college in the city of Ichikawa in Chiba Prefecture, Japan. Originally established as a women's junior college in 1950, the school became coeducational in 2005.
