= Ōmachi Station (Chiba) =

Railway station in Ichikawa, Chiba Prefecture, Japan

HS07 Ōmachi Station 大町駅
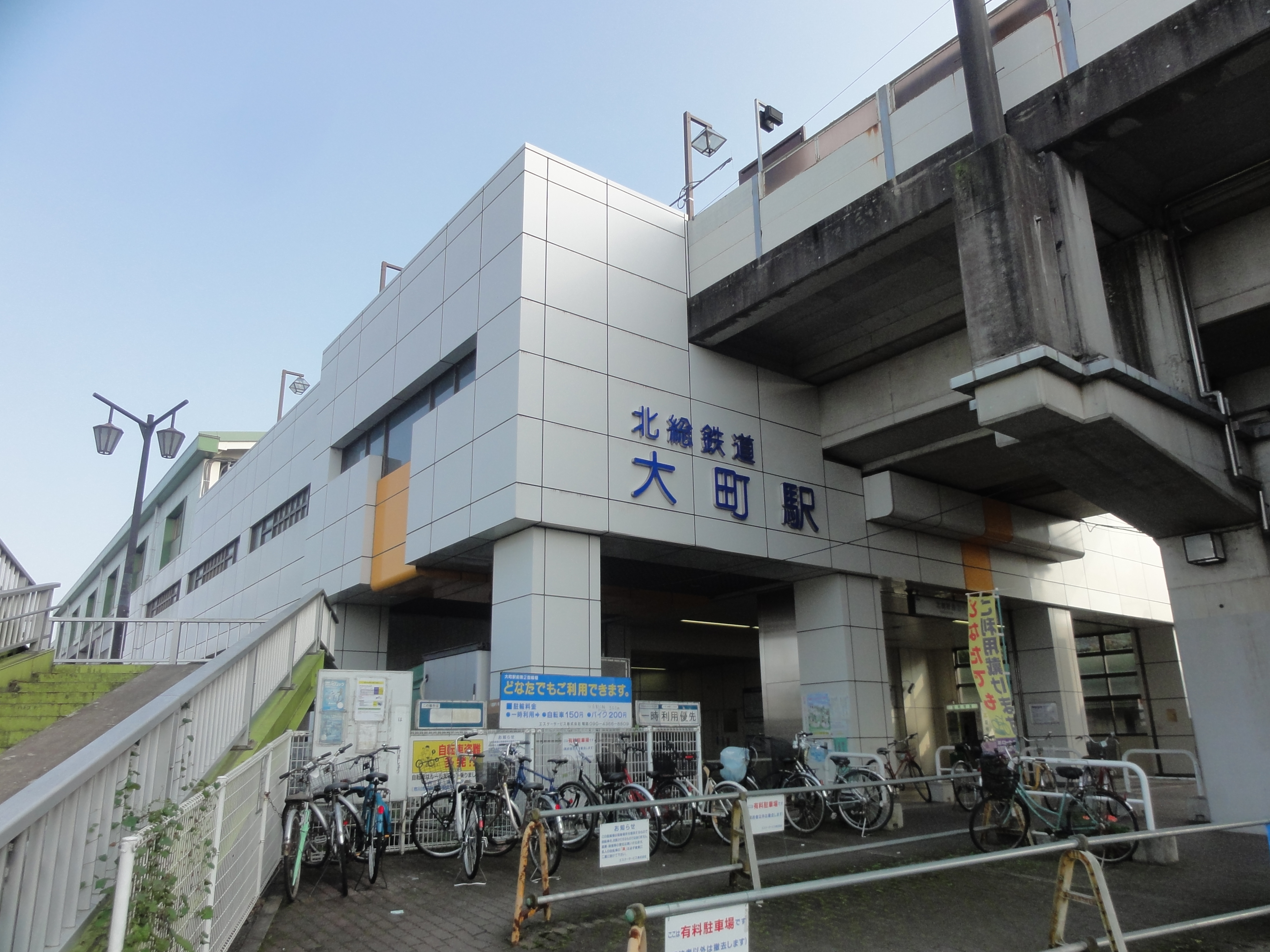
- Ōmachi Station, October 2015

General information
- Location: 175 Ōmachi, Ichikawa-shi, Chiba-ken 272-0801; Japan
- Coordinates: 35°46′30.5″N 139°58′25″E
- Operator: Hokusō Railway
- Line: Hokusō Line
- Distance: 10.4 km from Keisei-Takasago
- Platforms: 2 side platforms

Other information
- Station code: HS07
- Website: Official website

History
- Opened: 31 March 1991

Passengers
- FY2018: 843 daily

Services
Preceding station	Hokusō Railway	Following station
Matsuhidai HS06 towards Keisei Takasago	Hokusō Line Local	Shin-Kamagaya HS08 towards Imba Nihon-idai
Location
- Location within Chiba Prefecture Location within Japan

Ōmachi Station (大町駅, Ōmachi-eki) is a passenger railway station in the city of Ichikawa, Chiba, Japan, operated by the third sector Hokusō Railway.

== Lines ==
Ōmachi Station is served by the Hokusō Line and is located 10.4 kilometers from the terminus of the line at Keisei-Takasago.

== Station layout ==
This station consists of two opposed elevated side platforms serving two tracks, with the station building underneath.

=== Platforms ===
1	■ Hokusō Line	for Higashi-Matsudo, Keisei-Takasago, Oshiage, Ueno, Shinagawa, and Haneda Airport Domestic Terminal
2	■ Hokusō Line	for Shin-Kamagaya , Imba Nihon-idai, and Narita Airport

== History ==
Ōmachi Station was opened on 31 March 1991. On 17 July 2010 a station numbering system was introduced to the Hokusō Line, with the station designated HS07.

== Passenger statistics ==
In fiscal 2018, the station was used by an average of 842 passengers daily.

== Surrounding area ==
- Ichikawa City Botanical Garden
- National Route 464

== See also ==
- List of railway stations in Japan
