= Konodai Girls' School =

Coordinates: 35.7326°N 139.9156°E

Konodai Girls' School Japanese: 国府台女子学院
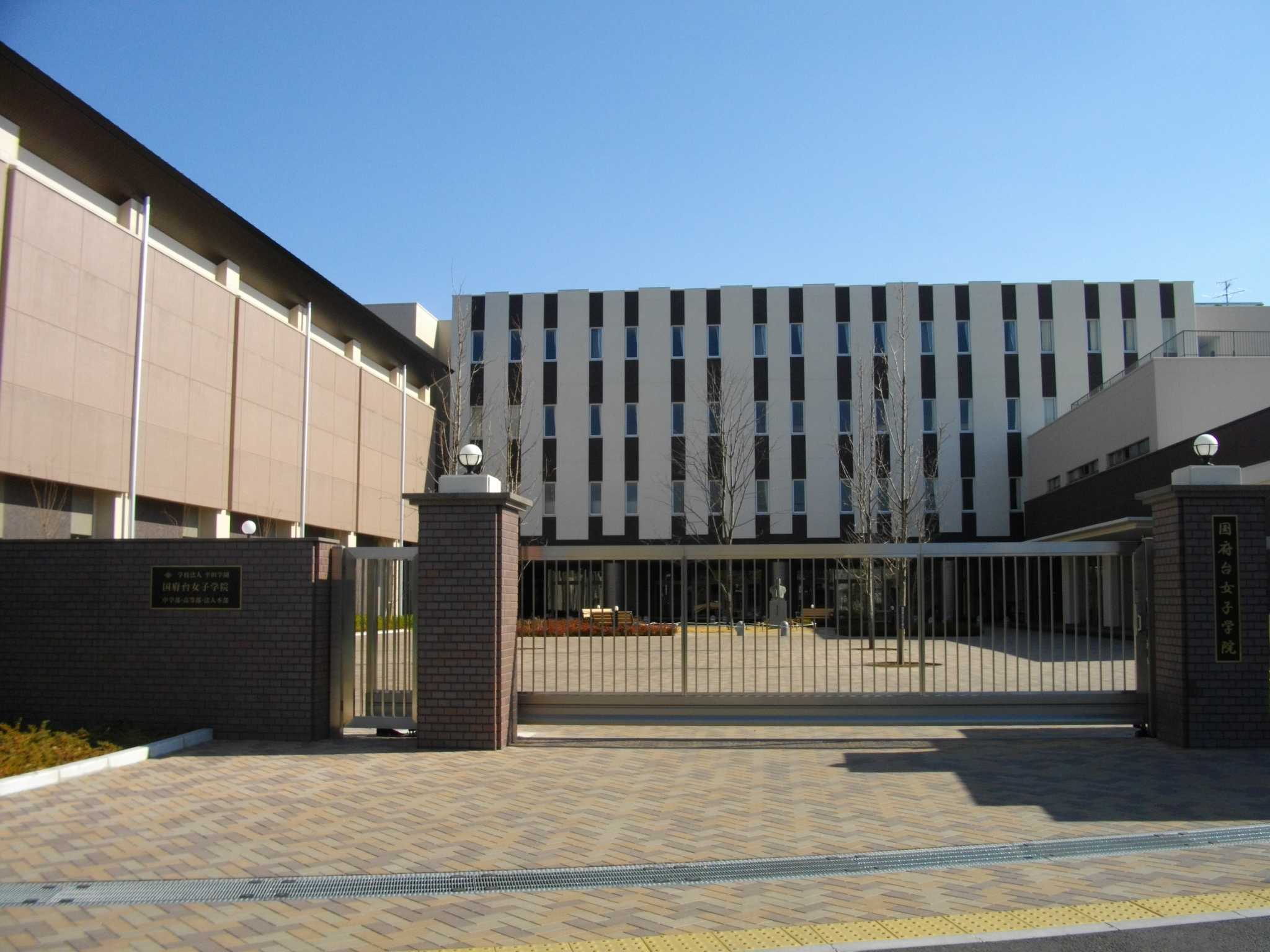

Information
- School type: Private school
- Gender: Girls
- Website: www.konodai-gs.ac.jp

Konodai Girls' School (Japanese: 国府台女子学院, romanized: Kounodai joshi gakuin) is a girls' private school in Ichikawa, Chiba, Japan, offering education for elementary, junior high, and senior high school.
