= Keisei Koiwa Station =

Railway station in Tokyo, Japan

Coordinates: 35.7421°N 139.8839°E

KS11 Keisei Koiwa Station 京成小岩駅
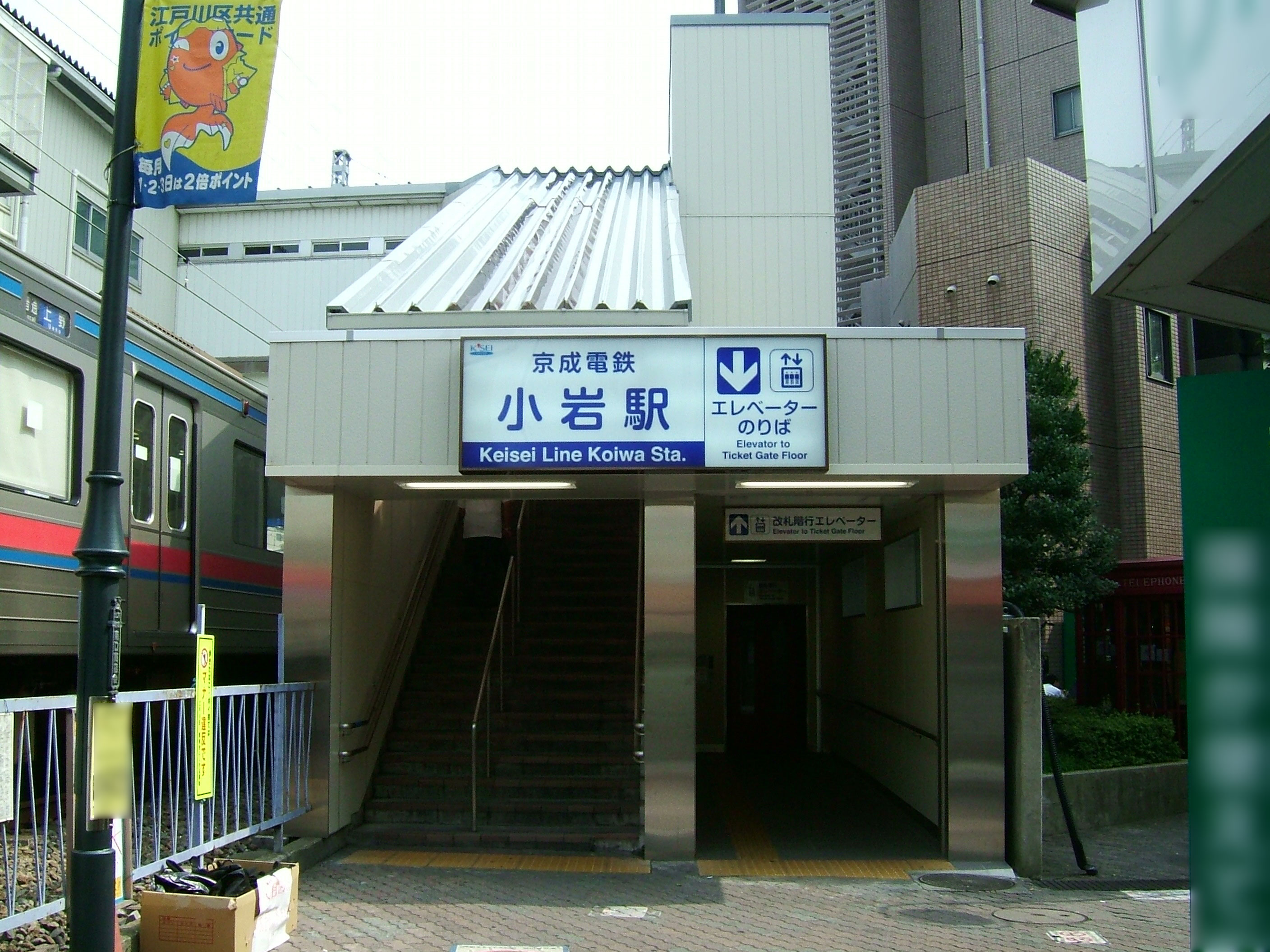
- The south entrance

General information
- Location: 2-10-9 Kita-Koiwa, Edogawa, Tokyo; Japan
- Operator: Keisei Electric Railway
- Line: Keisei Main Line

Other information
- Station code: KS11

History
- Opened: May 15, 1932

Passengers
- FY2015: 17,369 daily

Services
Preceding station	Keisei	Following station
Keisei Takasago KS10 towards Keisei Ueno	Main Line Rapid	Keisei Yawata KS16 towards Narita Airport Terminal 1
Keisei Takasago KS10 towards Keisei Ueno	Main Line Local	Edogawa KS12 towards Narita Airport Terminal 1
Location

Keisei Koiwa Station (京成小岩駅, Keisei Koiwa-eki) is a train station located in Edogawa, Tokyo, Japan.

== Lines ==
- Keisei Electric Railway
  - Keisei Main Line

== Layout ==
This station consists of two island platforms serving four tracks.

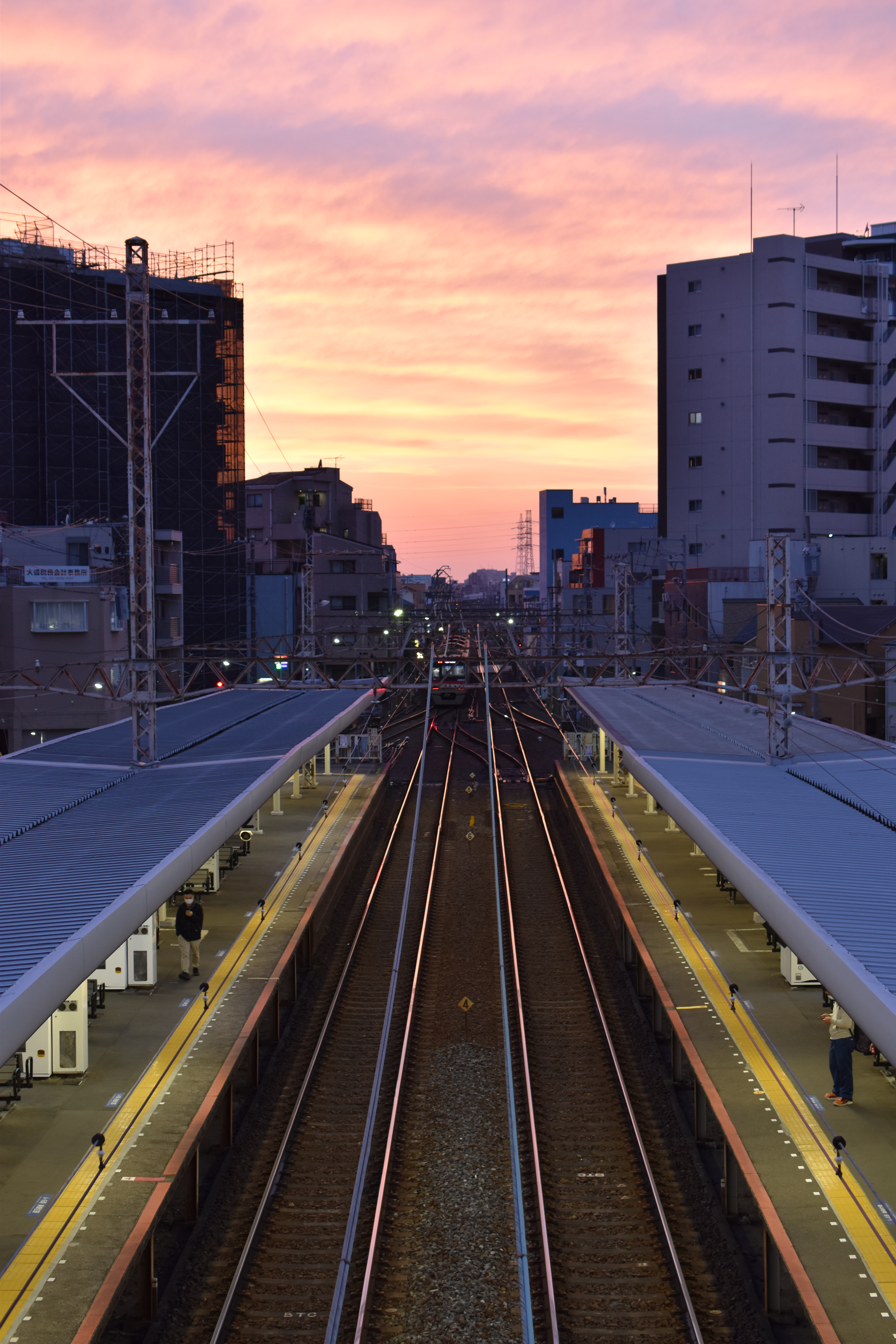
The platforms of Keisei Koiwa Station.

=== Platforms ===
1, 2	Keisei Main Line	for Keisei Takasago, Nippori, Keisei Ueno, and Oshiage; Toei Asakusa Line for Nihombashi, Shimbashi, and Nishi-magome
3, 4	Keisei Main Line	for Keisei Funabashi, Keisei Chiba, Keisei Narita and Narita Airport (Terminal 2·3 and Terminal 1)

== History ==
- 1932 - The station begins operation
- 17 June 2010 - Station numbering was introduced to all Keisei Line stations; Keisei Koiwa was assigned station number KS11.
