= Moto-Yawata Station =

Railway and metro station in Ichikawa, Chiba Prefecture, Japan

JB28 Moto-Yawata Station (JR) Motoyawata Station (Toei) 本八幡駅

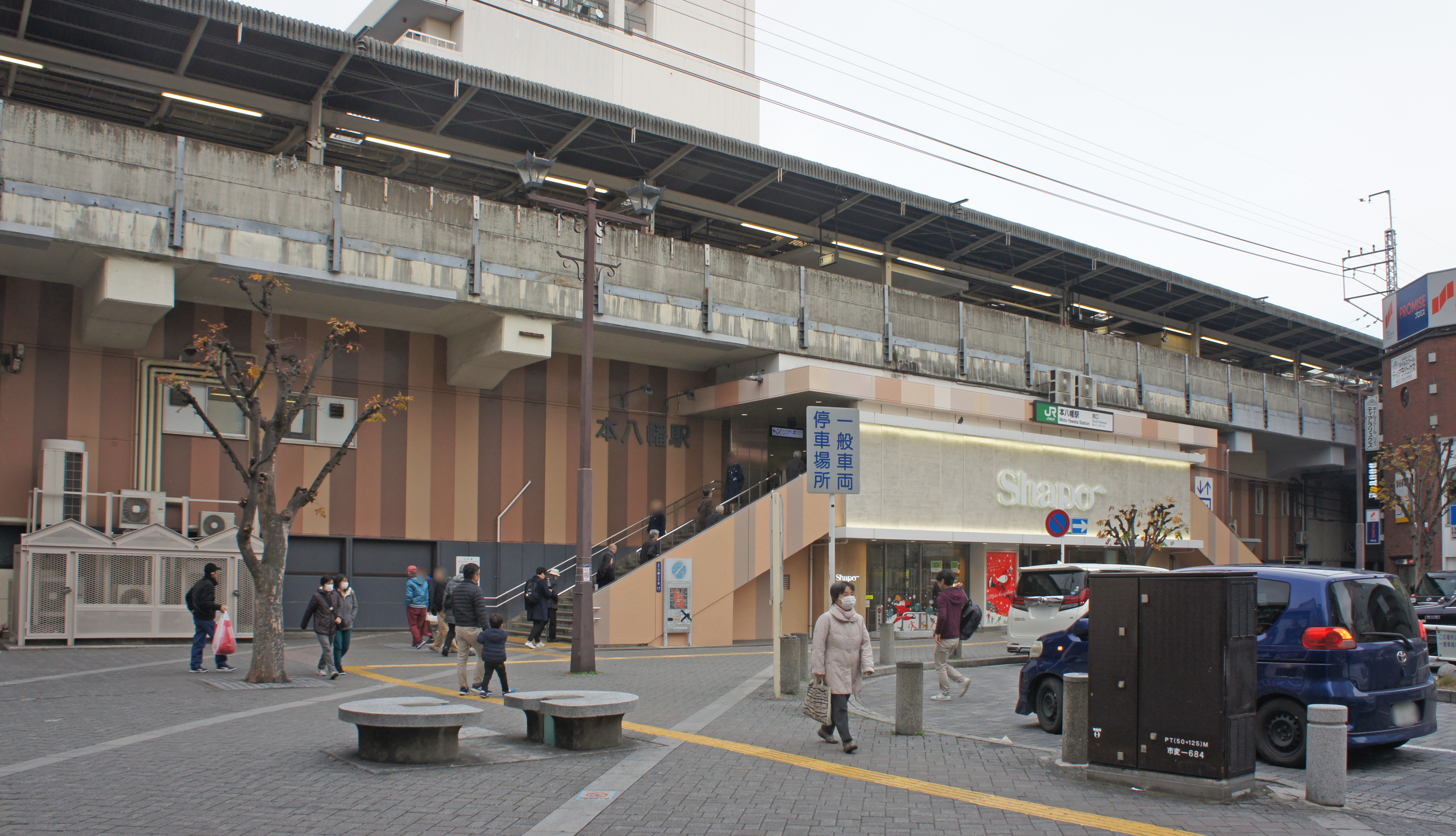
- Elevated JR Moto-Yawata Station

General information
- Location: 2-chome Yawata, Ichikawa City, Chiba Prefecture 272-0021; Japan
- Coordinates: 35.7218°N 139.9269°E
- Operator: JR East; Toei Subway
- Lines: Chūō-Sōbu Line; Shinjuku Line
- Platforms: 2 island platforms (1 JR East, 1 Toei)
- Tracks: 4 (2 for JR East, 2 for Toei)
- Connections: KS16 Keisei Yawata

Construction
- Structure type: Underground

Other information
- Status: Staffed ("Midori no Madoguchi" )
- Station code: JB28 (Chūō-Sōbu Line); S-21 (Toei Shinjuku Line)
- Website: Official website

History
- Opened: 1 September 1935; 90 years ago (JR East); 19 March 1989; 37 years ago

Passengers
- FY2018: 60,125 (JR); 40,500 (Toei)

Services
Preceding station	JR East	Following station
Ichikawa JB27 towards Mitaka	Chūō–Sōbu Line	Shimōsa-Nakayama JB29 towards Chiba
Preceding station	Toei Subway	Following station
Funabori towards Shinjuku	Shinjuku Line Express	Terminus
Shinozaki towards Shinjuku	Shinjuku Line Local	Terminus
Location
- Location within Tokyo Bay and Bōsō Peninsula Location within Chiba Prefecture Location within Japan

Moto-Yawata Station, also known as Motoyawata Station (本八幡駅, Motoyawata-eki), is a junction passenger railway station in the city of Ichikawa, Chiba, Japan, operated by East Japan Railway Company (JR East) and Tokyo Metropolitan Bureau of Transportation (Toei Subway). It is the only station on the Toei Subway that is located in Chiba Prefecture.

== Lines ==
Moto-Yawata Station is served by the Chūō-Sōbu Line of JR East and the Toei Shinjuku Line subway. The 23.5 kilometer Toei Shinjuku Line terminates at this station.

== Station layout ==
The station is divided into two sections: the elevated JR station and the underground subway station. The areas outside the ticket gates of the two sections are connected by a passage.

=== JR Platforms ===
The JR station has one island platform serving two tracks. There is no platform for rapid and limited express services on the two other tracks of the Sōbu Main Line.

1	Chūō-Sōbu Line	for Kinshichō, Akihabara, Shinjuku and Mitaka
2	Chūō-Sōbu Line	for Nishi-Funabashi, Tsudanuma and Chiba

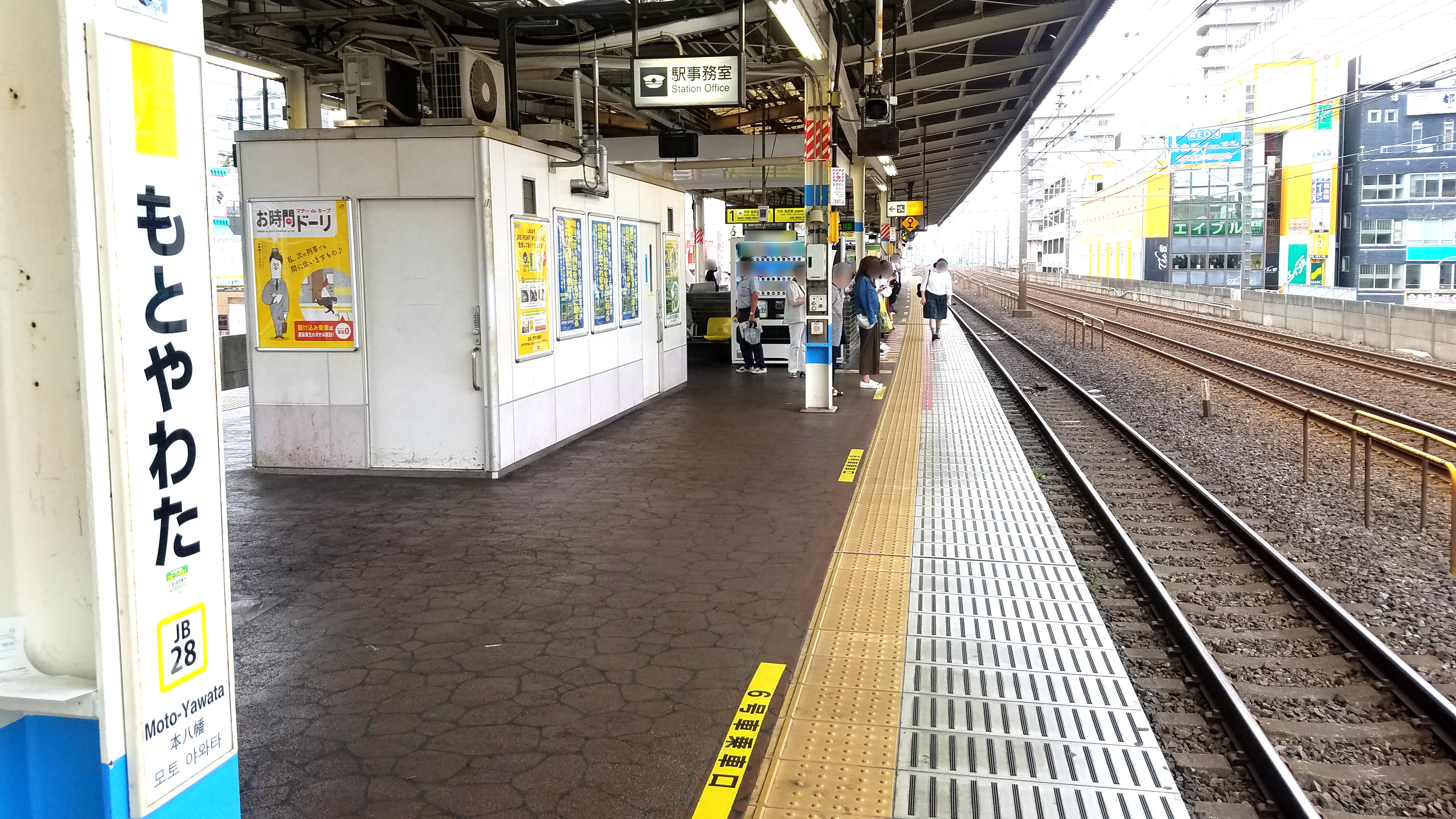
JR East platforms

=== Toei Platforms ===
The subway station also has one island platform serving two tracks. While one end of the subway station is connected to the JR East station, the other end is connected to Keisei Yawata Station on the Keisei Main Line.

1, 2	Shinjuku Line	for Bakuro-Yokoyama, Ichigaya and Shinjuku; Keio Line for Hatsudai, Hatagaya, Meidaimae, Chōfu, and Hashimoto

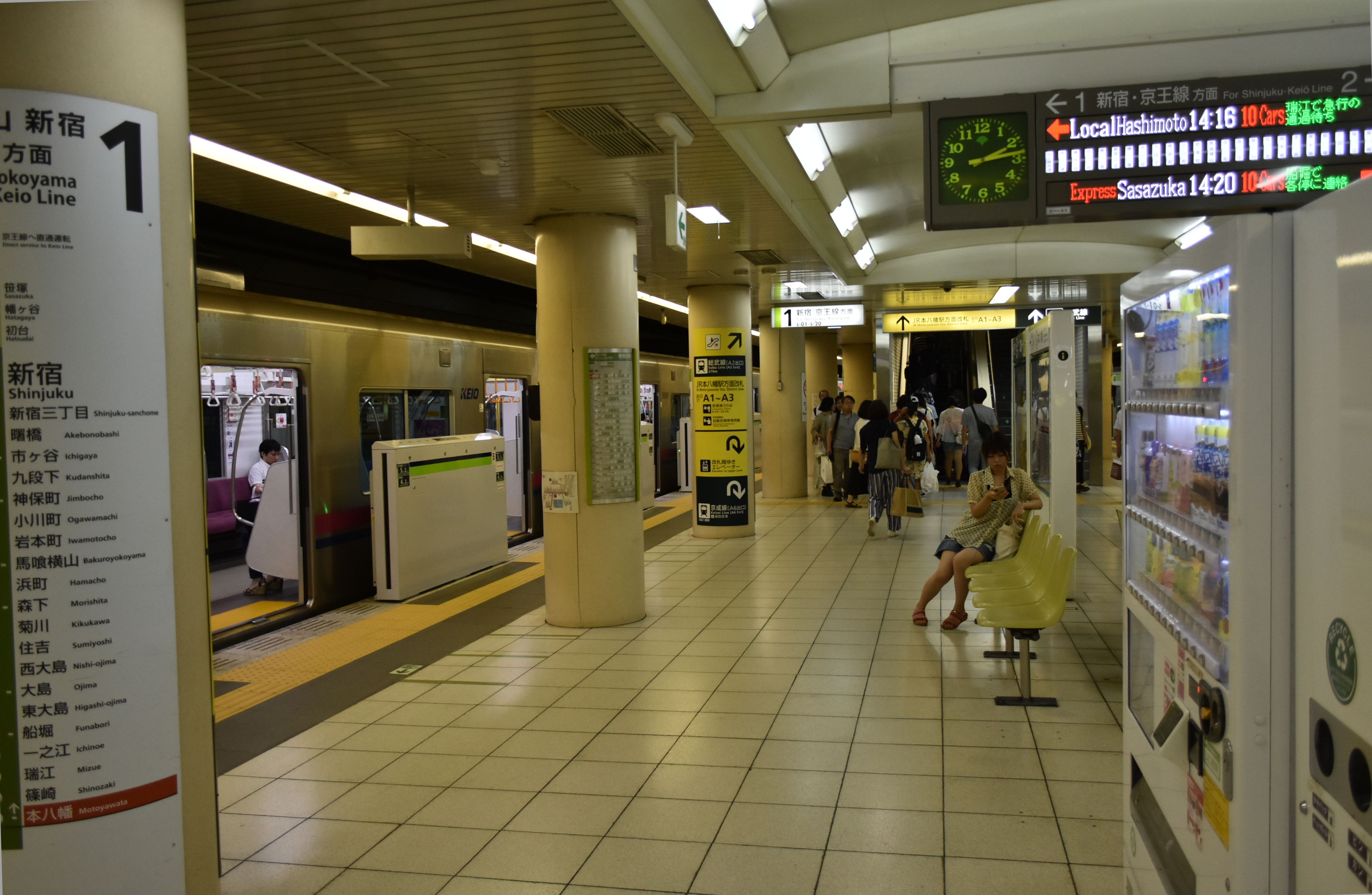
Toei platforms

== History ==
The station opened on the Sōbu Main Line on September 1, 1935. The Toei Shinjuku Line was extended to this station on March 19, 1989.

== Passenger statistics ==
In fiscal 2018, the JR portion of the station was used by an average of 60,125 passengers daily (boarding passengers only). The Toei Subway portion of the station was used by 40,500 passengers daily

== Surrounding area ==
- Ichikawa City Hall

== See also ==
- List of railway stations in Japan
