= Kōji Nakano (writer) =

Japanese novelist

- Nakano Kōji
- Born: 1 January 1925; Ichikawa, Chiba, Japan
- Died: 16 July 2004 (aged 79); Kamakura, Kanagawa, Japan
- Occupations: Novelist, translator, literary critic
- Writing career
- Genre

Kōji Nakano (中野 孝次, Nakano Kōji; 1 January 1925 – 16 July 2004) was a Japanese novelist, translator of German literature and literary critic in Shōwa period Japan.

== Biography ==
Nakano was born in Ichikawa, Chiba, as the son of a carpenter. He was a graduate of the German literature department of Tokyo University in 1950. From 1952 to 1981, he worked as a professor at Kokugakuin University.

Nakano was noted for his translations of the works of Franz Kafka and Hans Erich Nossack into the Japanese language.

In 1976, he published a collection of essays, Buryugeru e no tabi ("Journey to Bruegel"), which won the Japan Essayist's Club Award. He followed this with an autobiographical series of books: Mugi ururu hi ni ("When the Wheat Ripens", 1978), which was awarded the Hirabayashi Taiko Literary Prize. Other noteworthy works include Nigai Natsu ("Bitter Summer", 1979) ad Kisetsu no owari ("The End of the Season", 1980). Nakano won numerous literary awards in his career, cumulating with the Japan Art Academy Award in 2004.
