= Tokyo Management College =

Private junior college Chiba, Japan

Coordinates: 35°44′46.02″N 139°56′15.92″E

- 東京経営短期大学; Tōkyō keiei tanki daigaku
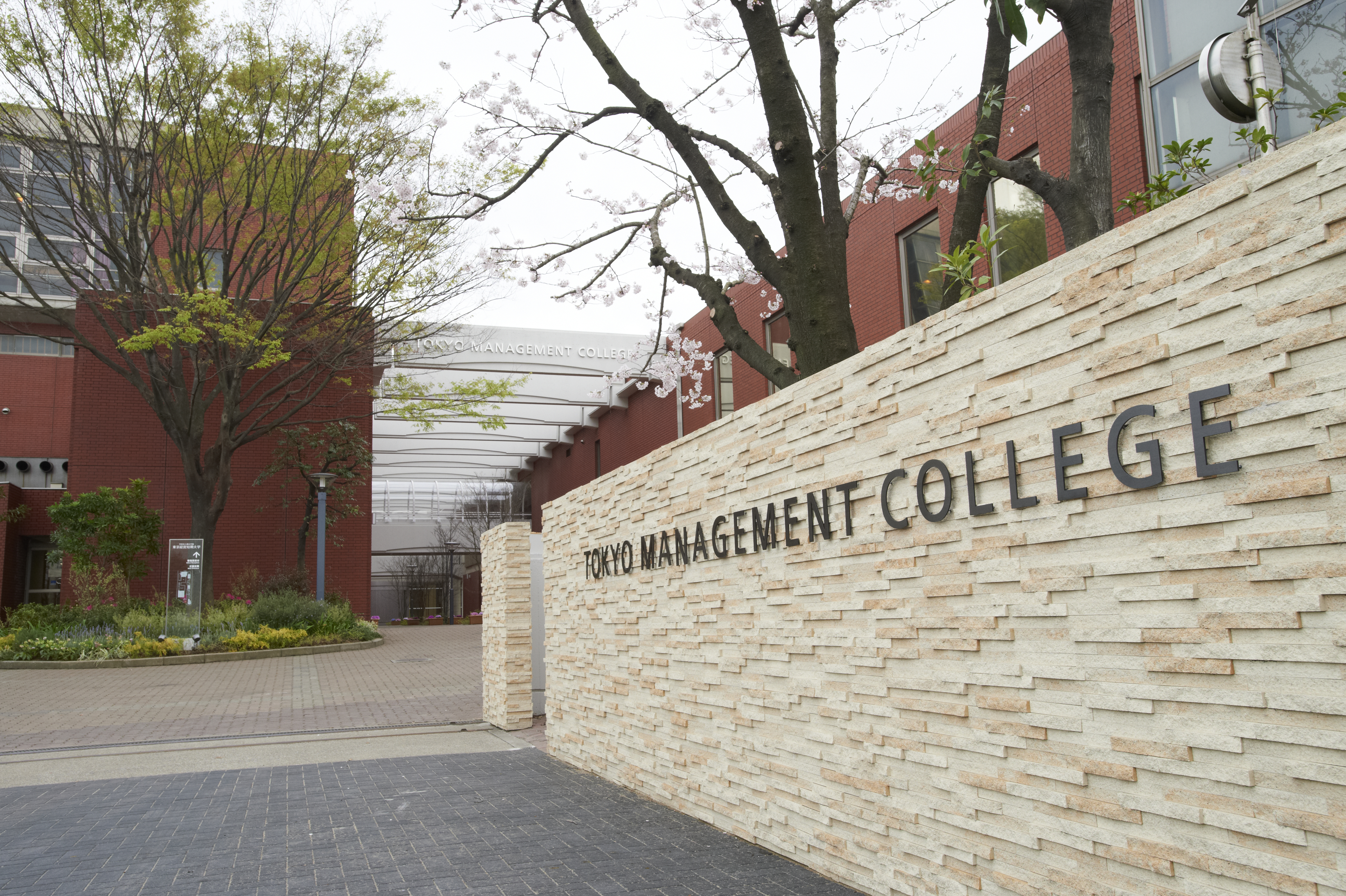
- Tokyo Management College
- Type: Private
- Established: 1992
- Location: Ichikawa, Chiba, Japan
- Website: Official website

Tokyo Management College (東京経営短期大学, Tōkyō keiei tanki daigaku) is a private junior college in the city of Ichikawa in Chiba Prefecture, Japan. It was established in 1992.
