= Chiba University of Commerce =

Private Japanese university

Coordinates: 35°44′30.77″N 139°54′23.83″E

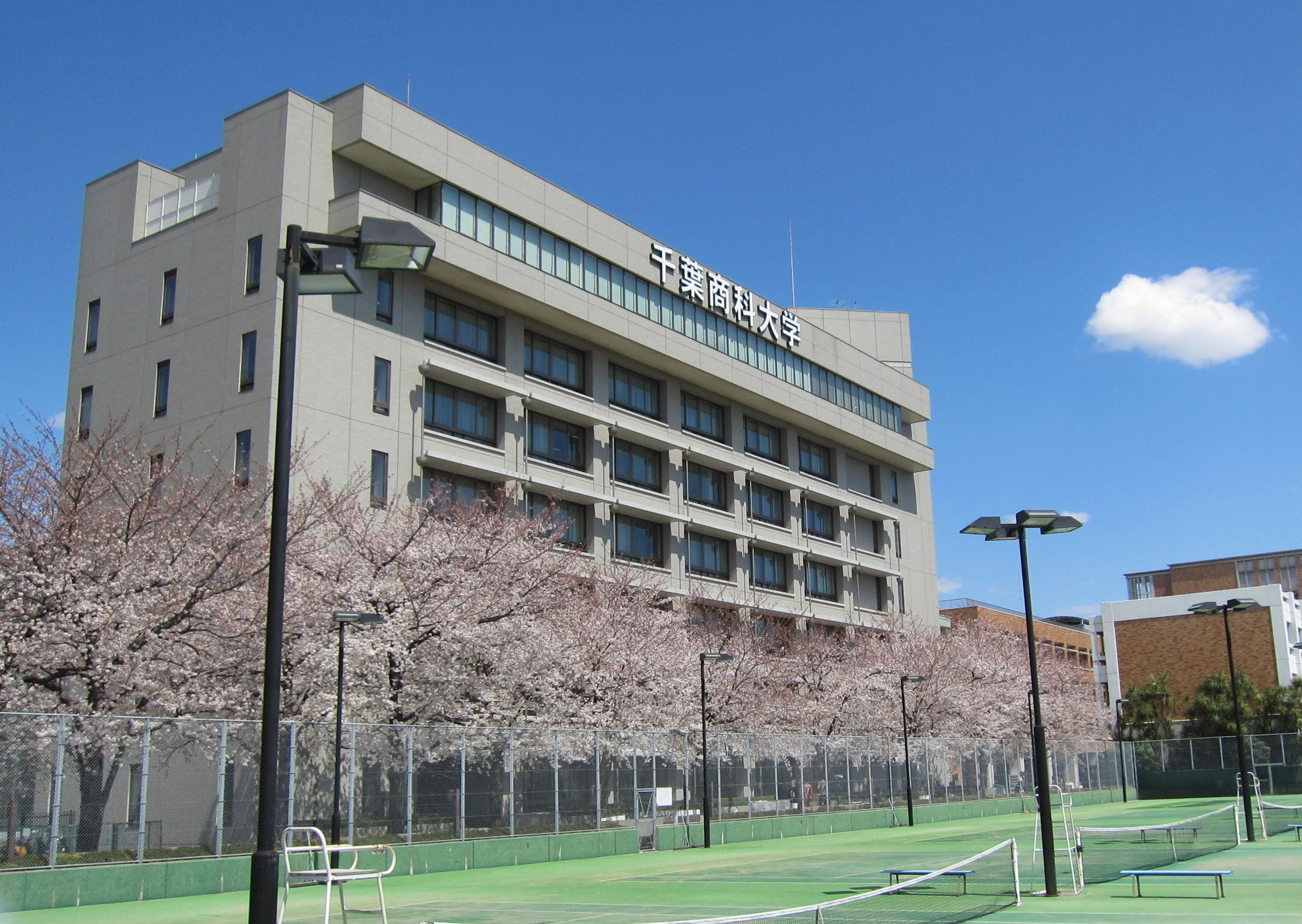
Main building

Chiba University of Commerce (千葉商科大学, Chiba shōka daigaku) is a private university in Ichikawa, Chiba, Japan, established in 1950. The predecessor of the school was founded in 1928.
