= Keisei Yawata Station =

Railway station in Ichikawa, Chiba Prefecture, Japan

KS16 Keisei Yawata Station 京成八幡駅
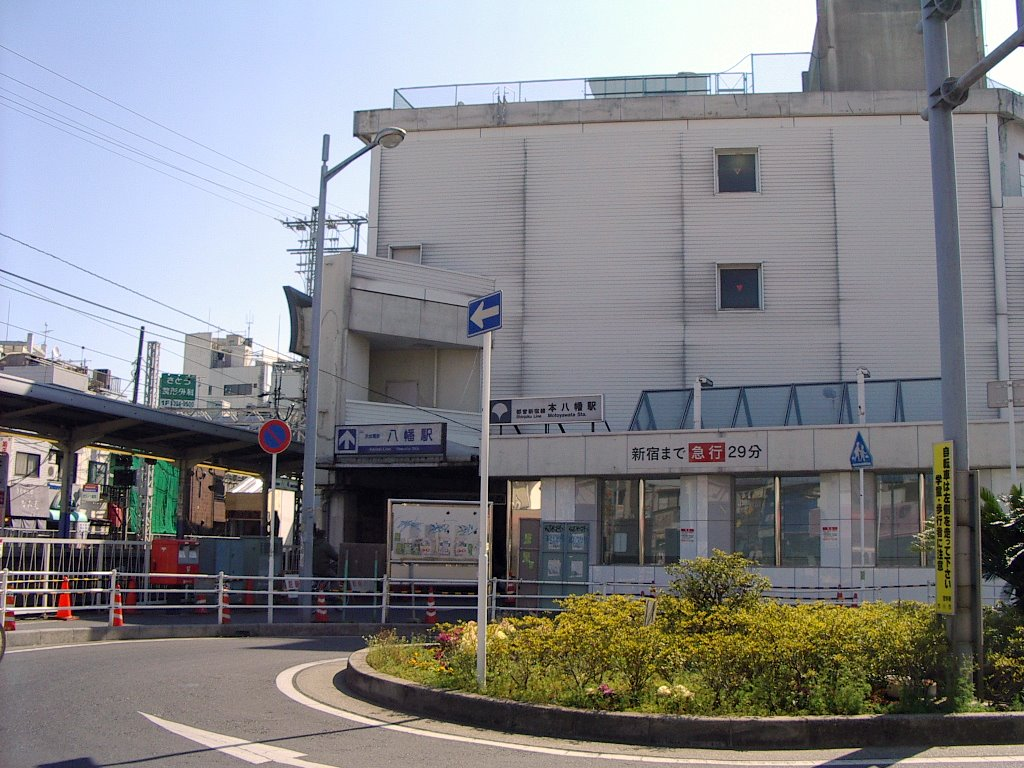
- Keisei Yawata Station

General information
- Location: 3-2-1 Yawata, Ichikawa-shi, Chiba-ken 272-0021; Japan
- Coordinates: 35.723865°N 139.928060°E
- Operator: Keisei Electric Railway
- Line: Keisei Main Line
- Distance: 19.1 from Keisei-Ueno
- Platforms: 1 island platform
- Connections: Motoyawata Station

Other information
- Station code: KS16
- Website: Official website

History
- Opened: November 3, 1915
- Former names: Shin-Yawata (until 1942)

Passengers
- FY2019: 36,364 daily

Services
Preceding station	Keisei	Following station
Keisei Takasago KS10 towards Keisei Ueno	Main Line Rapid Limited Express Limited Express Commuter Express	Keisei Funabashi KS22 towards Narita Airport Terminal 1
Keisei Koiwa KS11 towards Keisei Ueno	Main Line Rapid	Higashi-Nakayama KS24 towards Narita Airport Terminal 1
Sugano KS15 towards Keisei Ueno	Main Line Local	Onigoe KS17 towards Narita Airport Terminal 1
Location
- Location within Chiba Prefecture

Keisei Yawata Station (京成八幡駅, Keisei Yawata-eki) is a railway station on the Keisei Main Line in the city of Ichikawa, Chiba, Japan, operated by the private railway operator Keisei Electric Railway. The station is located near Motoyawata Station on the Toei Shinjuku Line.

== Lines ==
Keisei Yawata Station is served by the Keisei Main Line and is positioned 19.1 kilometres (11.9 miles) from the line's terminus at Keisei-Ueno Station.

== Layout ==
The station features a single island platform accessible via a footbridge that connects to an elevated station building.

=== Platforms ===
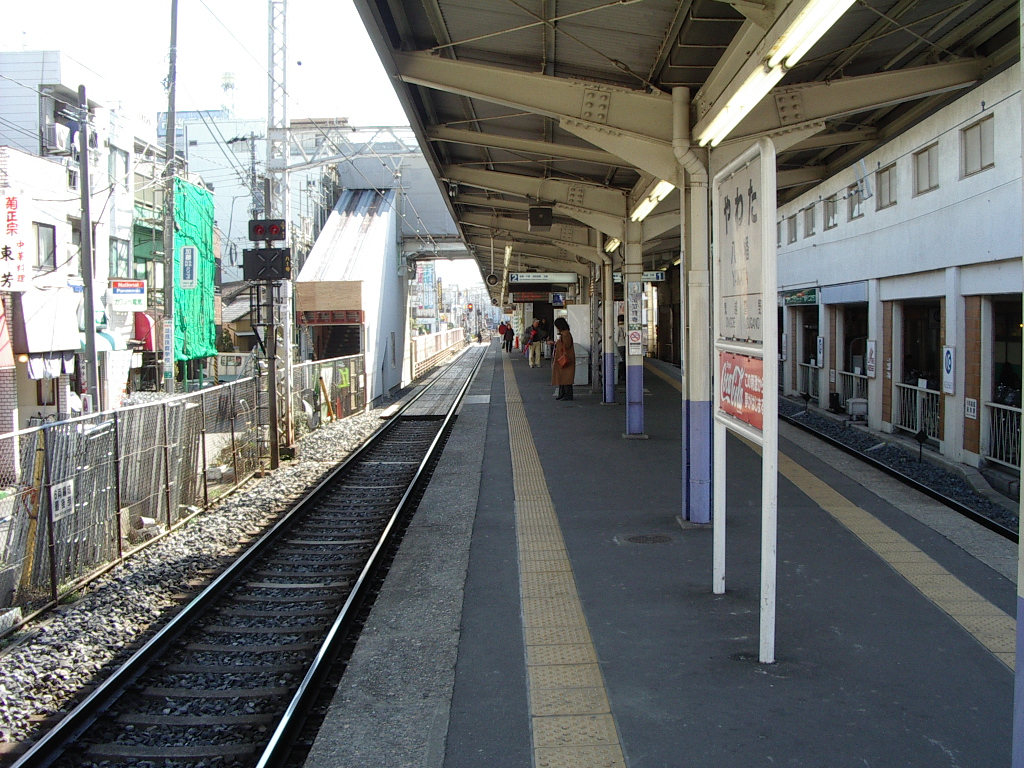
Platforms of the station

1	Keisei Main Line	for Keisei Takasago, Nippori, Keisei Ueno and Oshiage; Toei Asakusa Line for Nihombashi, Shimbashi and Nishi-magome; Keikyu Main Line for Shinagawa and Haneda Airport (International Terminal and Domestic Terminal)
2	Keisei Main Line	for Keisei Funabashi, Keisei Tsudanuma, Keisei Chiba, Keisei Narita and Narita Airport (Terminal 2·3 and Terminal 1)

== History ==
Keisei Yawata Station was opened on 3 November 1915 as Shin-Yawata Station (新八幡駅, Shin-Yawata eki). The original Yawata Station was located towards Onigoe Station and was closed on 15 August 1942. The station was renamed to its present name on 1 November 1942. Ichikawa Keisei Department Store opened at the station in 1963.The store closed in 2007 as part of the JR Motoyawata Station re-development project.

Station numbering was introduced to all Keisei Line stations on 17 July 2010. Keisei Yawata was assigned station number KS16.

== Passenger statistics ==
In fiscal 2019, the station was used by an average of 36,364 passengers daily.

== Surrounding area ==
- Moto-Yawata Station ( Toei Shinjuku Line)
- Showa Gakuin Junior College
- Fuji Girls' High School

== See also ==
- List of railway stations in Japan
