= Ichikawamama Station =

Railway station in Ichikawa, Chiba Prefecture, Japan

KS14 Ichikawamama Station 市川真間駅
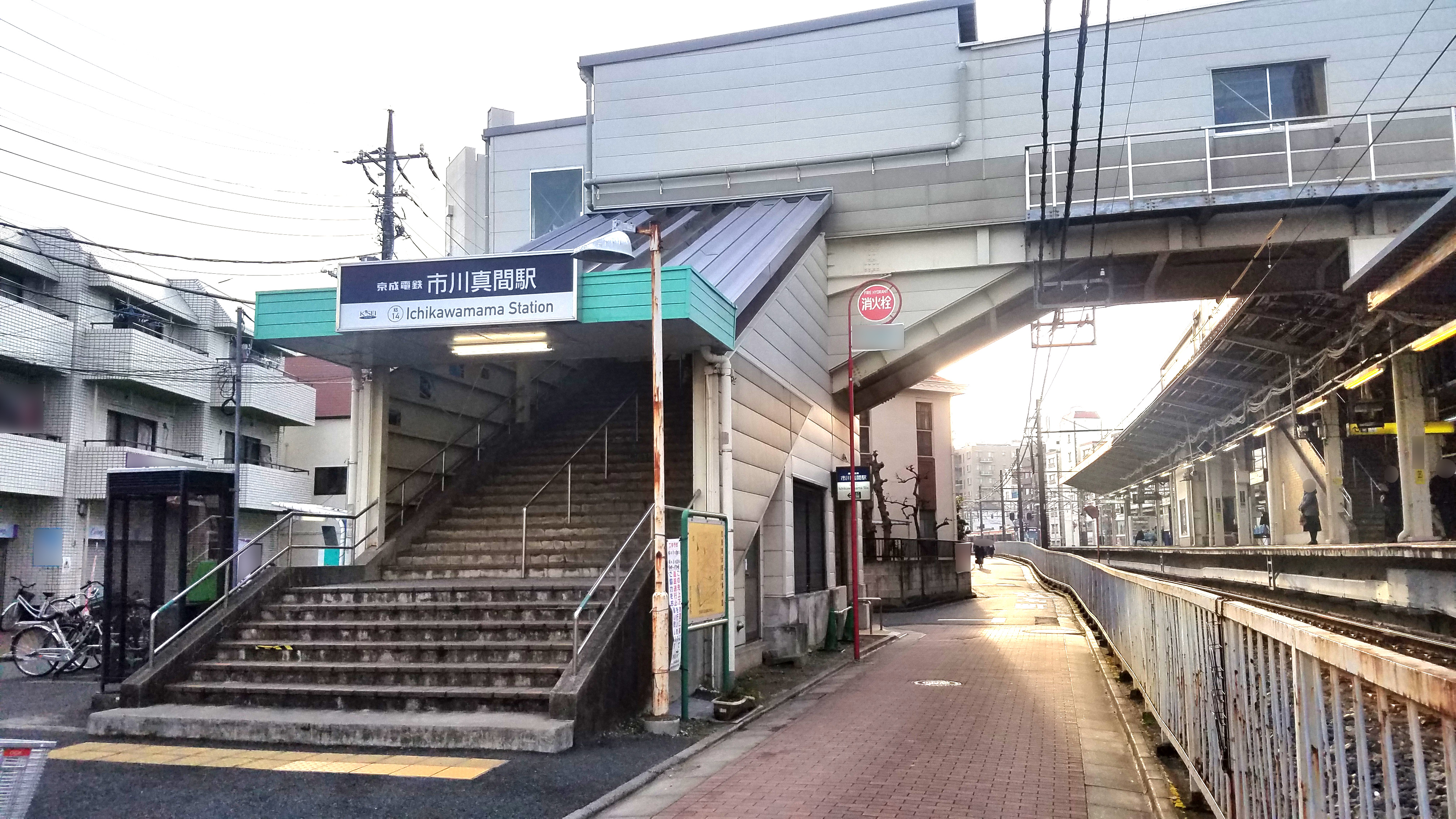
- The north-side entrance to the Station in January 2022

General information
- Location: 1-11-1 Mama, Ichikawa-shi, Chiba-ken 272-0826; Japan
- Coordinates: 35.7318°N 139.9120°E
- Operator: Keisei Electric Railway
- Line: Keisei Main Line
- Distance: 17.3 from Keisei-Ueno
- Platforms: 1 island platform

Other information
- Station code: KS14
- Website: Official website

History
- Opened: August 30, 1914
- Former names: Ichikawa-Shinden (until 1916)

Passengers
- FY2019: 7258

Services
Preceding station	Keisei	Following station
Kōnodai KS13 towards Keisei Ueno	Main Line Local	Sugano KS15 towards Narita Airport Terminal 1
Location
- Location within Chiba Prefecture

Ichikawamama Station (市川真間駅, Ichikawamama-eki) is a passenger railway station on the Keisei Main Line in the city of Ichikawa, Chiba Japan, operated by the private railway operator Keisei Electric Railway.

== Lines ==
Ichikawamama Station is served by the Keisei Main Line, and is located 17.3 km from the terminus of the line at Keisei-Ueno Station.

== Layout ==
The station consists of two ground-level island platforms serving four tracks, with station building located over the platforms.

=== Platforms ===
1-2	Keisei Main Line	for Keisei-Takasago, Nippori, and Keisei Ueno
3-4	Keisei Main Line	for Keisei Tsudanuma, Chiharadai, and Keisei Narita

== History ==
The station opened on August 30, 1914, as Ichikawa-Shinden Station (市川新田駅). It was renamed in June 1916.

Station numbering was introduced to all Keisei Line stations on 17 June 2010. Ichikawamama was assigned station number KS14.

== Passenger statistics ==
In fiscal 2019, the station was used by an average of 7258 passengers daily.

== Surrounding area ==
- Konodai Girls' High School Elementary School / Junior High School / High School
- Hide Gakuen High School
- Hide Gakuen Junior High School
- Hinode Gakuen Elementary School

== See also ==
- List of railway stations in Japan
