= Ichikawa, Chiba =

Ichikawa 市川市
- City
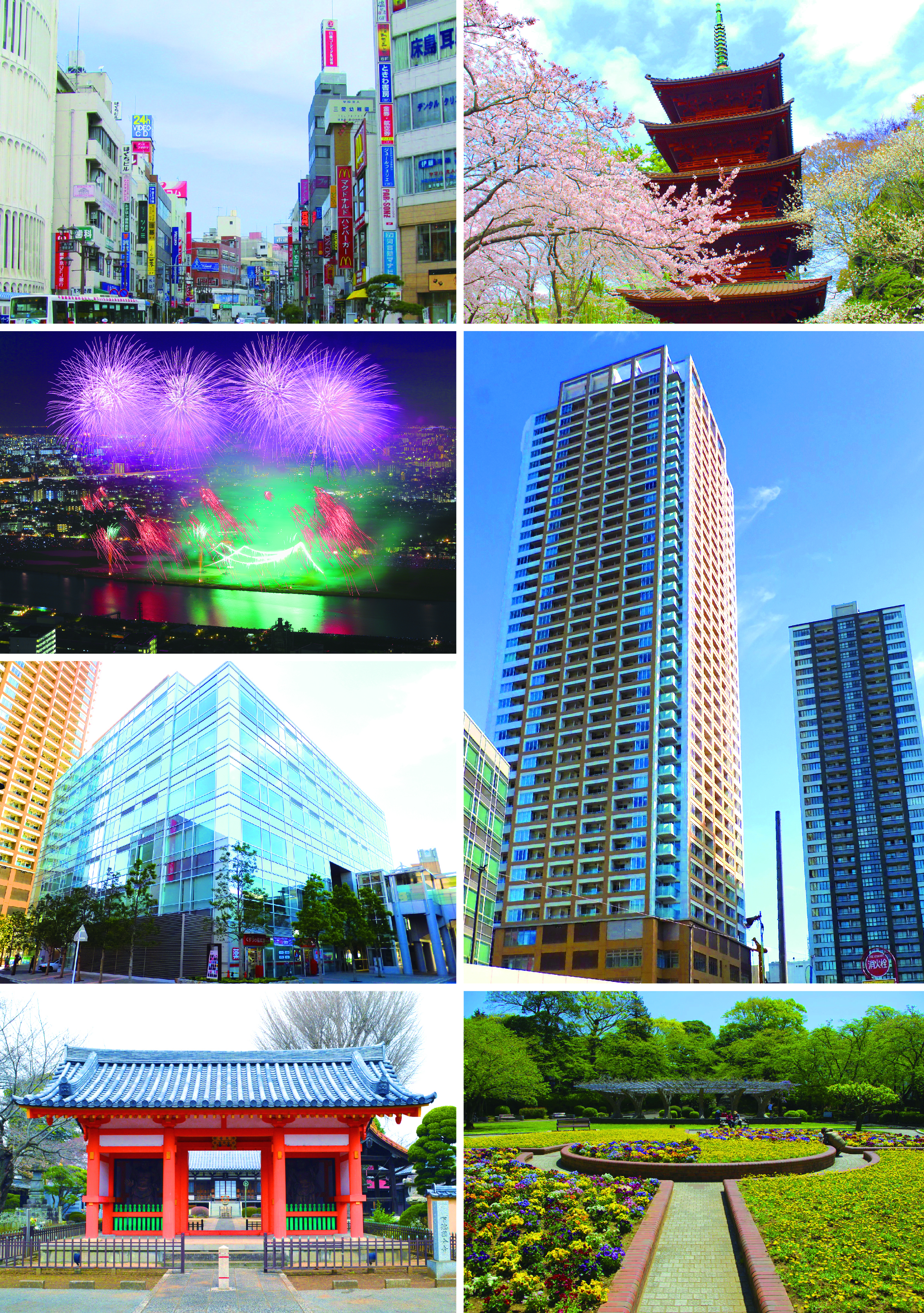
Moto-Yawata	Hokekyō-ji
Ichikawa Fireworks	High-rise apartments in Yawata
Keisei Electric Railway head office	High-rise apartments in Yawata
Shimōsa Kokubun-ji	Satomi Park
- Flag Seal

- Location of Ichikawa in Chiba Prefecture

- Coordinates: 35°43′18.9″N 139°55′51.8″E
- Country: Japan
- Region: Kantō
- Prefecture: Chiba
- First official recorded: 100 AD (official)
- Town settled: April 1, 1889
- City settled: November 3, 1934

Government
  - Mayor: Ko Tanaka (since April 2022)

Area
  - Total: 57.45 km^{2} (22.18 sq mi)

Population (January 31, 2024)
  - Total: 492,749
  - Density: 8,577/km^{2} (22,210/sq mi)
- Time zone: UTC+9 (Japan Standard Time)
- Tree: Pinus thunbergii
- Flower: Rose
- Bird: Cettia diphone
- Phone number: 047-334-1111
- Address: 1-1-1 Yawata, Ichikawa-shi, Chiba-ken 272-8501
- Website: Official website

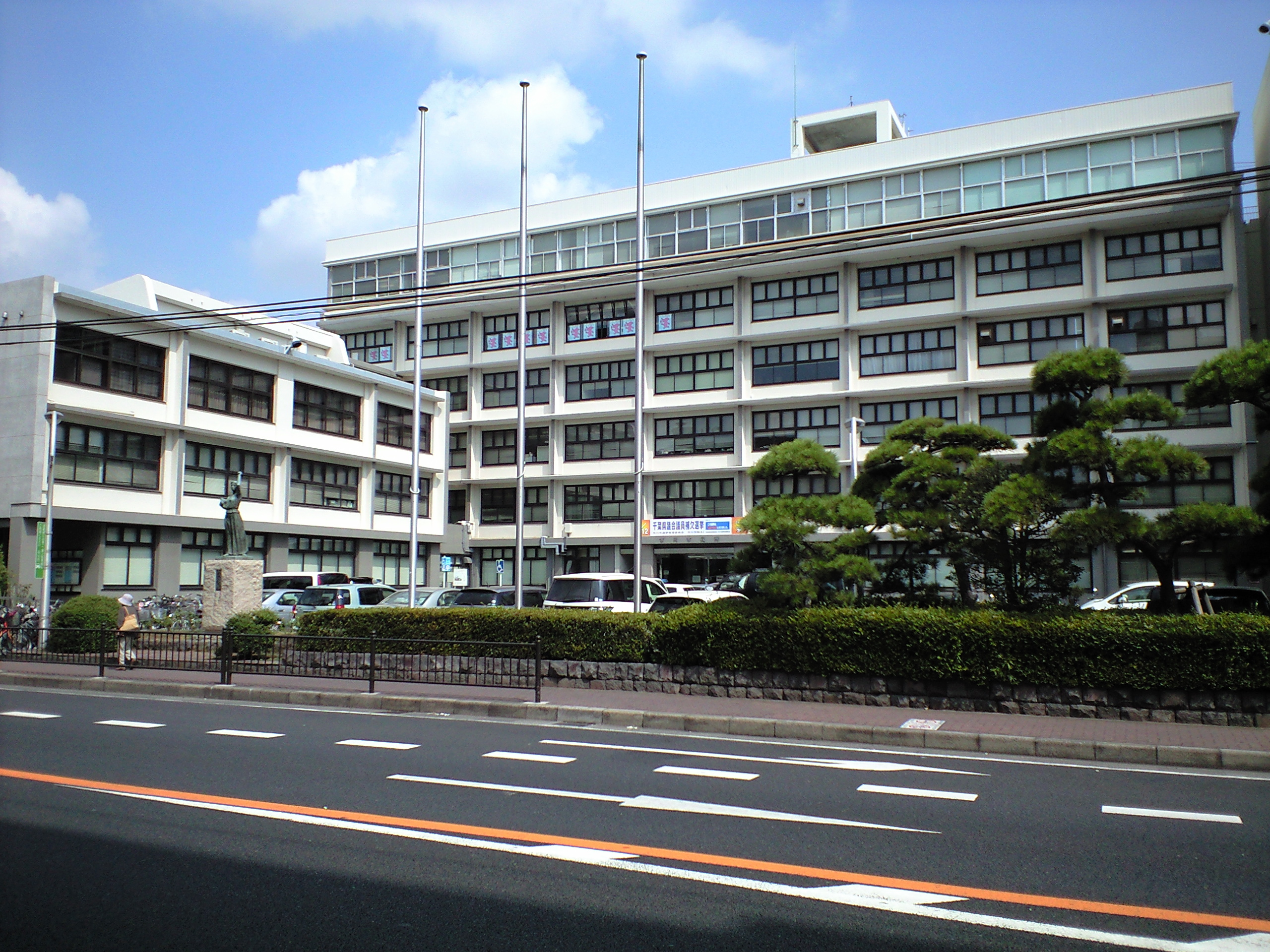
Ichikawa City Hall

Ichikawa (市川市, Ichikawa-shi; Japanese pronunciation: [ì.c̟͡ɕi̥.kä̀.β̞ä̀, -kä́.β̞ä̀, -kä́.β̞ä́.ɕì]) is a city in western Chiba Prefecture, Japan. As of 31 January 2024, the city had an estimated population of 492,749 in 256,229 households and a population density of 8577 persons per km^{2}. The total area of the city is 57.45 square kilometres (22.18 sq mi). The city has good transportation connections to the center of Tokyo, as with many areas of Chiba Prefecture. Major rail routes and roads pass through the city.

== Geography ==
Ichikawa is located in the northwestern part of Chiba prefecture, about 20 kilometers from the prefectural capital at Chiba and within 10 to 20 kilometers from the center of Tokyo. The western border of the city is separated from Edogawa Ward of Tokyo by the Edogawa River. The southern part of the city is an alluvial plain about two meters above sea level, and the northern part is part of the gentle Shimosa Plateau rising about 20 meters above sea level. The highest point is 30.1 meters in Satomi Park. Parts of the city are on reclaimed land at sea level.

=== Surrounding municipalities ===
Chiba Prefecture

- Funabashi
- Kamagaya
- Matsudo
- Urayasu

Tokyo Metropolis

- Edogawa

=== Climate ===
Ichikawa has a humid subtropical climate (Köppen Cfa) characterized by warm summers and cool winters with light to no snowfall. The average annual temperature in Ichikawa is 15.4 °C. The average annual rainfall is 1404 mm with September as the wettest month. The temperatures are highest on average in August, at around 27.0 °C, and lowest in January, at around 4.9 °C.

== Demographics ==
Per Japanese census data, the population of Ichikawa has increased fifteen-fold over the past century.

Historical population
Year	Pop.	±%
1920	31,676	—
1930	52,972	+67.2%
1940	75,257	+42.1%
1950	120,565	+60.2%
1960	157,301	+30.5%
1970	261,055	+66.0%
1980	364,244	+39.5%
1990	436,596	+19.9%
2000	448,642	+2.8%
2010	473,919	+5.6%
2020	496,676	+4.8%

== History ==
The area around present-day Ichikawa has been inhabited since the Japanese Paleolithic period. Archaeologists have found stone tools dating to some 30,000 years ago. Numerous shell middens from the Jōmon period, and hundreds of burial tumuli from the Kofun period have been found in numerous locations around Ichikawa. During the Nara period, Ichikawa was the provincial capital of Shimōsa Province and is mentioned in the Man'yōshū. During the Heian period, this area was the center of the rebellion by Taira Masakado. During the Sengoku period, it was the site of a major battles (Battle of Kōnodai) between the Satomi clan and the Later Hōjō clan.

In more recent history, the area was also the site of some minor battles during the Boshin War of the Meiji Restoration and was promoted as a possible site for the new Diet of Japan by Katsu Kaishu, who envisioned a structure to be built on the Edogawa River similar to the Houses of Parliament in London along the River Thames. Ichikawa Town was organized in 1889 with the creation of the modern municipalities system. On November 3, 1934 Ichikawa merged with the neighboring towns of Yawata, Nakayama and village of Kokubun to form the city of Ichikawa. The city expanded by annexing the village of Okashiwa on November 3, 1949, the town of Gyotoku on March 31, 1955 and town of Minami-Gyotoku on October 1, 1956.

== Government ==
Ichikawa has a mayor-council form of government with a directly elected mayor and a unicameral city council of 42 members. Ichikawa contributes six members to the Chiba Prefectural Assembly. In terms of national politics, the city is divided between the Chiba 5th district and the Chiba 6th district of the lower house of the Diet of Japan.

== Economy ==
Ichikawa during the Meiji period was considered a desirable location for politicians, industrialists and many cultural figures, and had the highest assessed land prices in Chiba Prefecture. Many modern writers and poets have either lived in Ichikawa, or had written works set in Ichikawa, including Soseki Natsume, Shiki Masaoka, Akiko Yosano, Yukio Mishima, Nagai Kafu, Hisashi Inoue and Koda Rohan. The area around Ichikawa Station and Motoyawata Station later developed into a commercial area with many high-rise condominiums, commercial facilities, and companies. The area around Motoyawata Station is also an administrative center where many city facilities such as the city hall are located.

The Gyotoku district in the south is an area which once had salt pans in the Edo Period, but was transformed in modern times into new town developments with good access to Tokyo via the Tokyo Metro Tozai Line. The bay area along the Keiyo Line and Japan National Route 357 (Metropolitan Expressway Bayshore Line / Higashi Kanto Expressway) is an industrial area as part of the Tokyo-Chiba industrial zone, and is a distribution base where factories and warehouses of various companies are lined up.

== Transportation ==
=== Railway ===
JR East – Sōbu Line (Rapid)

- Ichikawa

JR East – Chūō-Sōbu Line

- Ichikawa - Motoyawata

JR East – Musashino Line

- Ichikawa-Ōno

JR East – Keiyō Line

- Ichikawa-Shiohama - Futamata-Shimmachi

Keisei Electric Railway - Keisei Main Line

- Kōnodai - Ichikawa-Mama - Sugano - Keisei Yawata - Onigoe

Tokyo Metropolitan Bureau of Transportation - Shinjuku Line

- Moto-Yawata

Tokyo Metro - Tōzai Line

- Minami-Gyōtoku - Gyōtoku - Myōden

Hokusō Railway - Hokusō Line

- Kita-Kokubun - <Akiyama - Higashi-Matsudo - Matsuhidai> - Ōmachi

=== Highway ===
- Higashi-Kantō Expressway
- Keiyō Road
- Bayshore Route
- National Route 14
- National Route 298
- National Route 357
- National Route 464

== Education ==
=== Universities ===
- Chiba University of Commerce
- Institute of Science Tokyo Kōnodai Campus
- Showagakuin Junior College
- Tokyo Management College
- Wayo Women's University

==== Primary and secondary schools ====
- Ichikawa has 39 public elementary schools and three private elementary schools. The city has 27 public junior high schools and five private combined middle/high schools, including Ichikawa Gakuen. The city also has seven public high schools and two private high schools.

== Sister cities ==
Ichikawa is twinned with:

- Gardena, United States, since 1962
- Issy-les-Moulineaux, France, since 2012
- Leshan, China, since 1981
- Medan, Indonesia, since 1989
- Rosenheim, Germany, since 2004
- Caserta, Italy, since 2019

== Local attractions ==
- Nakayama Hokekyō-ji: A Buddhist temple with several national important cultural assets, including a gate and a Hokke-dō Hall from the Sengoku period and a Five-story Pagoda built in 1622.
- Katsushika Hachiman Shrine: A Shinto shrine built in the Heian period.
- Osu Disaster Prevention Park: Usually used as a recreation and relaxation site, this park is designated as a temporary evacuation and rescue site in times of disaster.
- Satomi Park: One of Ichikawa's main parks, Satomi Park stands on the hilly part of Konōdai, with the Edo River running below. It is famous for its cherry trees.
- Wild Bird Observatory: This facility is equipped with observation telescopes, and it has an exhibition room which is open to visitors.
- Zoological & Botanical Garden: This garden houses 70 species of animals, mainly small animals such as lesser pandas and orangutans. Nearby is the Natural Museum, Nature Park (Rose Garden), Youth Nature House (Planetarium), and privately managed athletic facilities.
- Teramachi-dori: Formerly called "Narita-michi" ("Narita Road"), this street was once used by pilgrims on their way to Narita-san Temple.
- Guhō-ji and the nearby Mama Well of Kamei-in, mentioned in Takahashi Mushimaro's poem in the Man'yōshū.
- Higashiyama Kaii Memorial Hall: Designed based on Germany, where Higashiyama studied, this two-story building is European in appearance with an octagonal tower.
- Lifelong Learning Center: Nicknamed "Media Park Ichikawa," this center supports learning for everyone from infants to seniors. The center's main attraction is the Central Library, along with the Audio Visual and Children's Hall.
- Clean Spa Ichikawa: Powered by heat from garbage incineration, this facility provides a swimming pool, warm bath, and gymnastic equipment.

== Notable people from Ichikawa ==
- Masa Takanashi, professional wrestler
- Sakaigawa Namiemon, Meiji period sumo wrestler
- Wakashima Gonshirō, Meiji period sumo wrestler
- Kōji Nakano, novelist
- Kuniko Inoguchi, cabinet minister
- Michio Hoshino, photographer
- Kazuki Kosakai, comedian
- Yūko Andō, newscaster
- Koji Ishikawa, illustrator
- Taiji, musician
- Yukihiro, musician
- Kazuo Takahashi, mixed martial artist
- Shigeki Maruyama, professional golfer
- Oginishiki Yasutoshi, sumo wrestler
- Tomo Sakurai, voice actress
- Tōki Susumu, sumo wrestler
- Ryoji Aikawa, professional baseball player
- Atsuko Maeda, singer and actress
- Kazushige Nosawa, professional wrestler
- G.G. Sato, professional baseball player
- Moe Oshikiri, fashion model
- Yuki Abe, professional soccer player
- Norimitsu Onishi, Journalist
- Tatsuhisa Suzuki, Voice actor
- Peter Takeo Okada, Roman Catholic Archbishop of Tokyo
- Yoko Narahashi, film producer and casting director
- Tao Okamoto, actress and model
- Yoshino Takamori, voice actress
- Kansei Matsuzawa, American football placekicker
