= Kōnodai Station =

Railway station in Ichikawa, Chiba Prefecture, Japan

KS13 Kōnodai Station 国府台駅
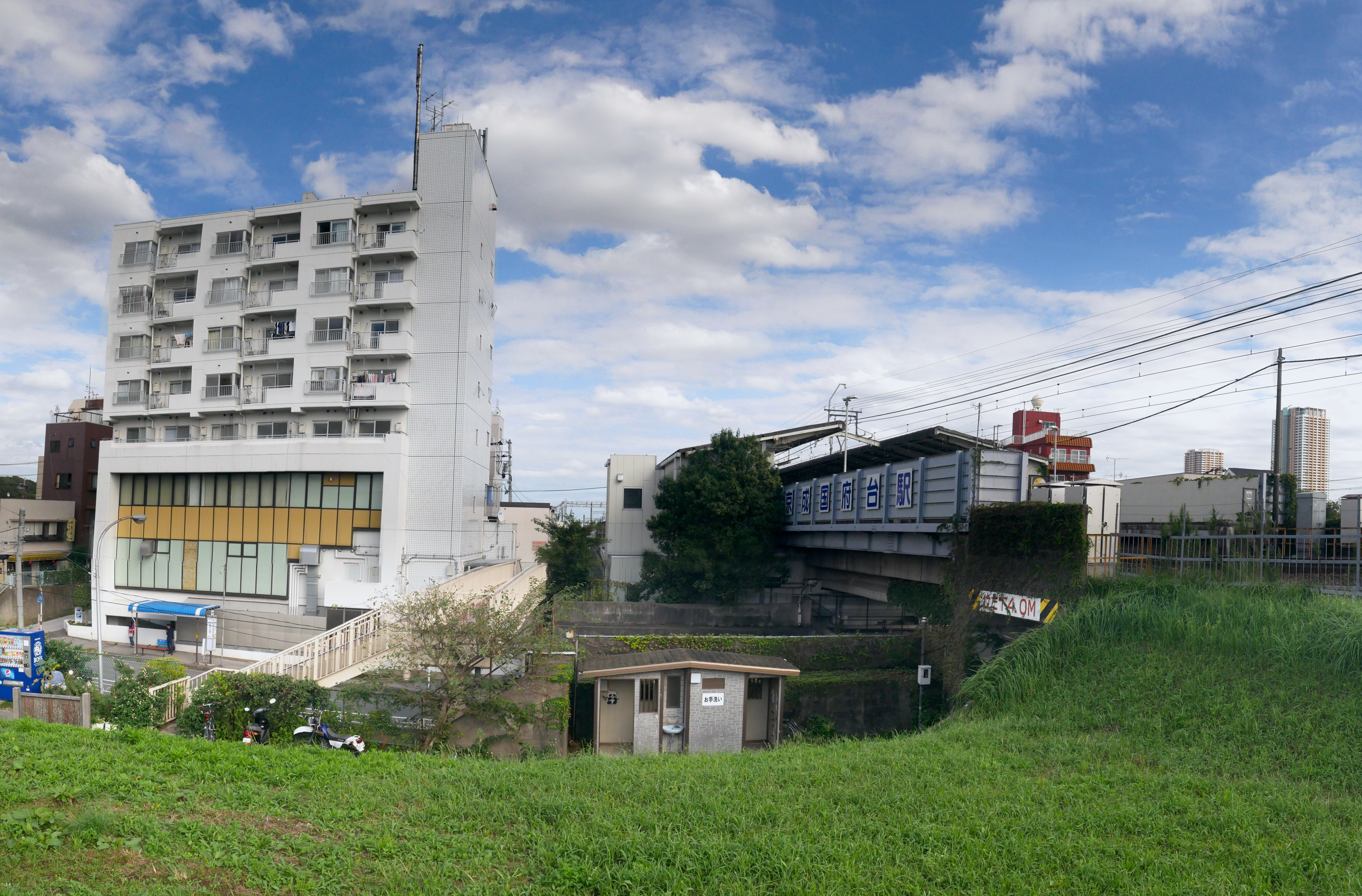
- Kōnodai Station, September 2018

General information
- Location: 3-30-1 Ichikawa, Ichikawa-shi, Chiba-ken 272-0034; Japan
- Coordinates: 35.7366°N 139.9033°E
- Operator: Keisei Electric Railway
- Line: Keisei Main Line
- Distance: 16.4 km from Keisei-Ueno
- Platforms: 2 side platforms

Other information
- Station code: KS13
- Website: Official website

History
- Opened: August 30, 1914
- Former names: Ichikawa-Kōnodai (until 1948)

Passengers
- FY2019: 13,201

Services
Preceding station	Keisei	Following station
Edogawa KS12 towards Keisei Ueno	Main Line Local	Ichikawamama KS14 towards Narita Airport Terminal 1
Location
- Location within Chiba Prefecture

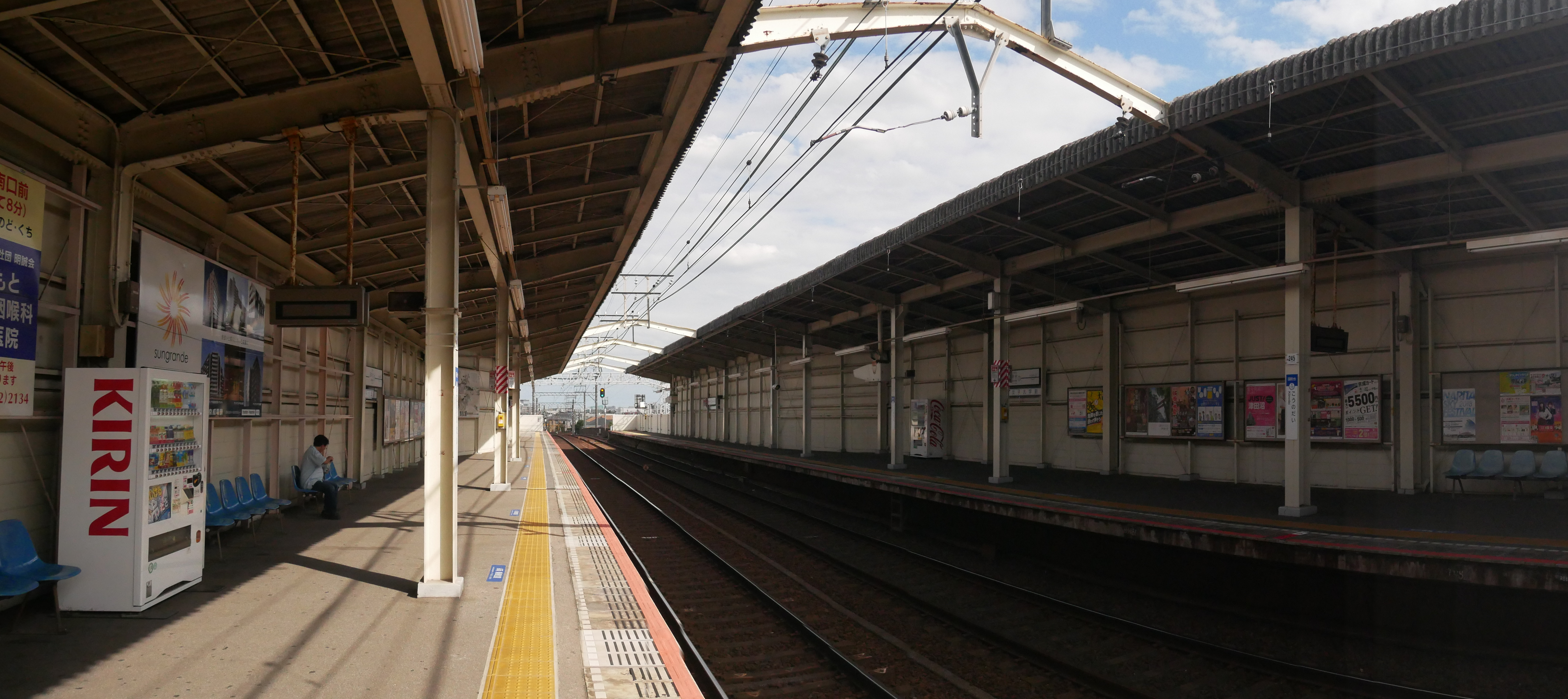
Platforms, 2018

Kōnodai Station (国府台駅, Kōnodai-eki) is a passenger railway station on the Keisei Main Line in the city of Ichikawa, Chiba Japan, operated by the private railway operator Keisei Electric Railway.

== Lines ==
Kōnodai Station is served by the Keisei Main Line, and is located 16.4 km from the terminus of the line at Keisei-Ueno Station.

== Station layout ==
Kōnodai Station has two elevated opposed side platforms connected via an underpass to the station building underneath.

=== Platforms ===
1	Keisei Main Line	for Keisei-Takasago, Nippori, and Keisei Ueno
2	Keisei Main Line	for Keisei Tsudanuma, Chiharadai, and Keisei Narita

== History ==
Kōnodai Station was opened on 30 August 1914 as Ichikawa-Kōnodai Station (市川鴻の台駅, Ichikawa-Kōnodai-eki). However, the name was shortened to Ichikawa Station on 11 December of the same year. It resumed its former name on 6 April 1921, but with different kanji (市川国府台駅) for its name. The station assumed its current name on 1 April 1948.

Station numbering was introduced to all Keisei Line stations on 17 July 2010; Kōnodai was assigned station number KS13.

== Passenger statistics ==
In fiscal 2019, the station was used by an average of 13,201 passengers daily.

== Surrounding area ==
- Tokyo Medical & Dental University (Liberal Arts Department)
- Chiba University of Commerce
- Wayo Women's University
- Chiba Prefectural Kounodai High School
- Ichikawa Municipal Daiichi Junior High School
- Ichikawa Municipal Second Junior High School

== See also ==
- List of railway stations in Japan
