= Kasai-Rinkai Park Station =

Railway station in Tokyo, Japan

JE06 Kasai-Rinkai Park Station 葛西臨海公園駅
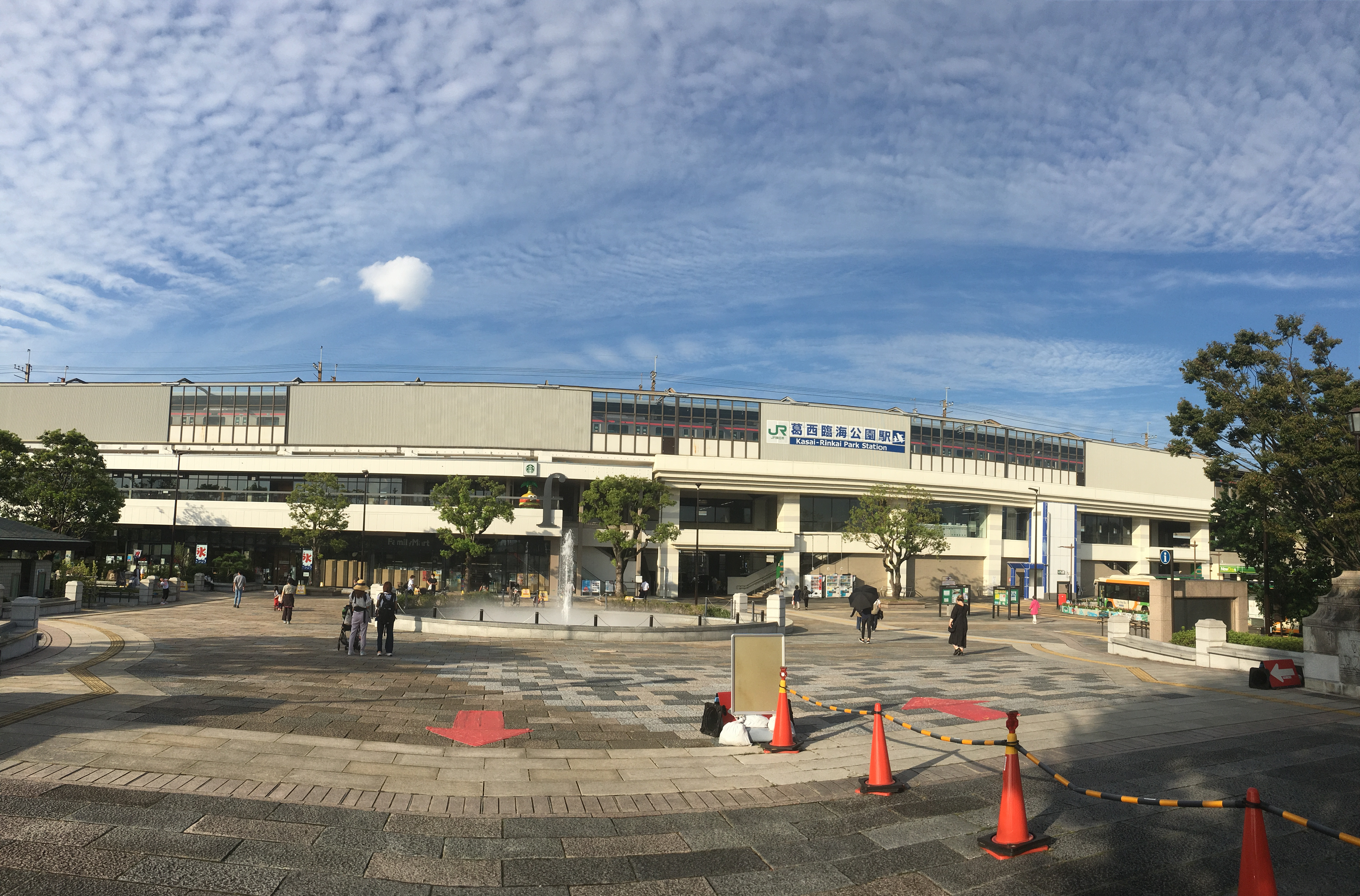
- Station forecourt, September 2021

General information
- Location: 6 Rinkai-chō, Edogawa-ku, Tokyo; Japan
- Coordinates: 35.6444°N 139.862°E
- Operator: JR East
- Line: Keiyō Line
- Platforms: 1 island platform
- Tracks: 4
- Connections: Bus terminal

Construction
- Structure type: Elevated
- Accessible: Yes

Other information
- Status: Unstaffed
- Station code: JE06

History
- Opened: 1 December 1988

Passengers
- FY2011: 11,644 daily

Services
| Preceding station | JR East | Following station |
|---|---|---|
| Shin-Kiba JE05 towards Tokyo | Keiyō Line Local | Maihama JE07 towards Soga |
| Shin-Kiba JE05 towards Tokyo | Musashino Line Keiyō Line through-service | Maihama JE07 towards Fuchūhommachi |
Location
- Location within Tokyo Keiyo area Location within Tokyo wards area Location within Japan

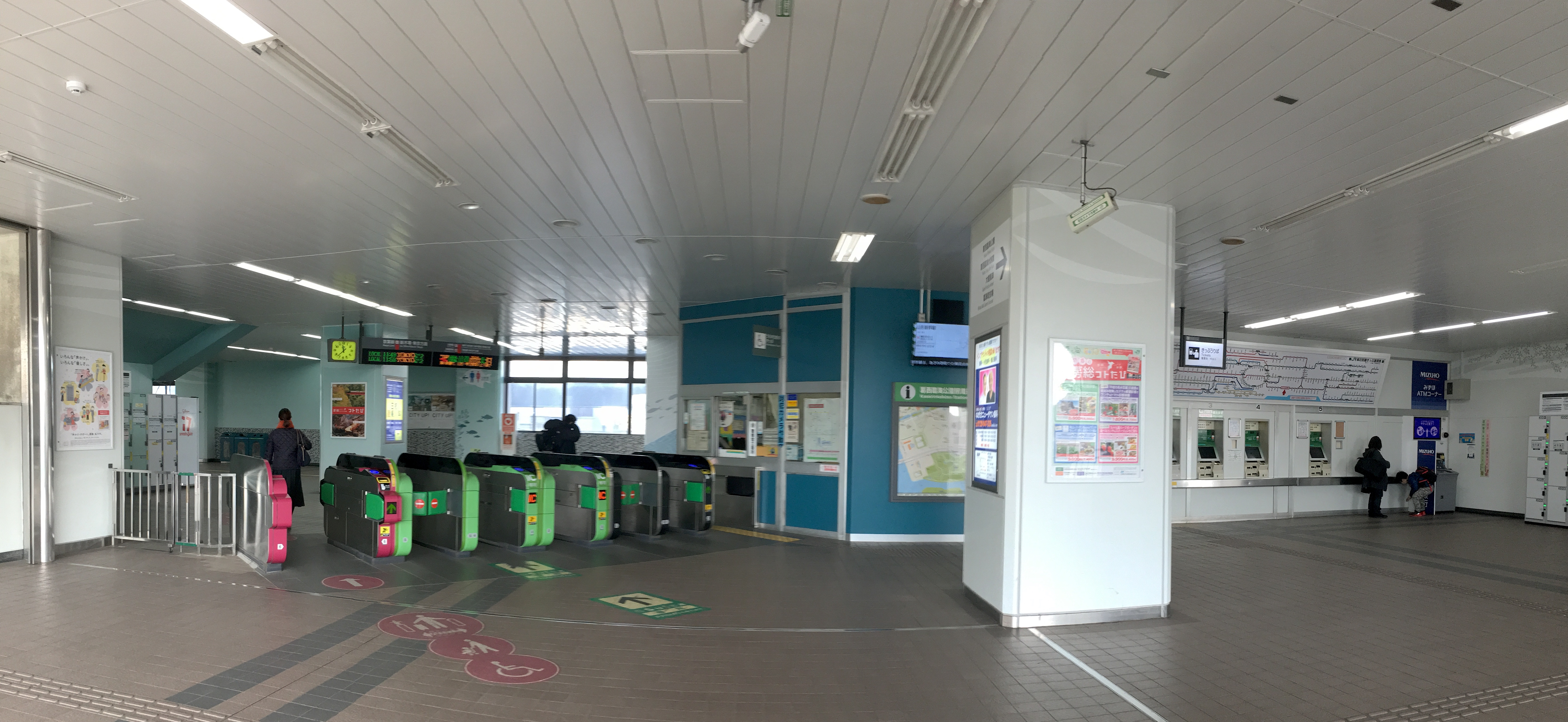
Ticket gates, 2019

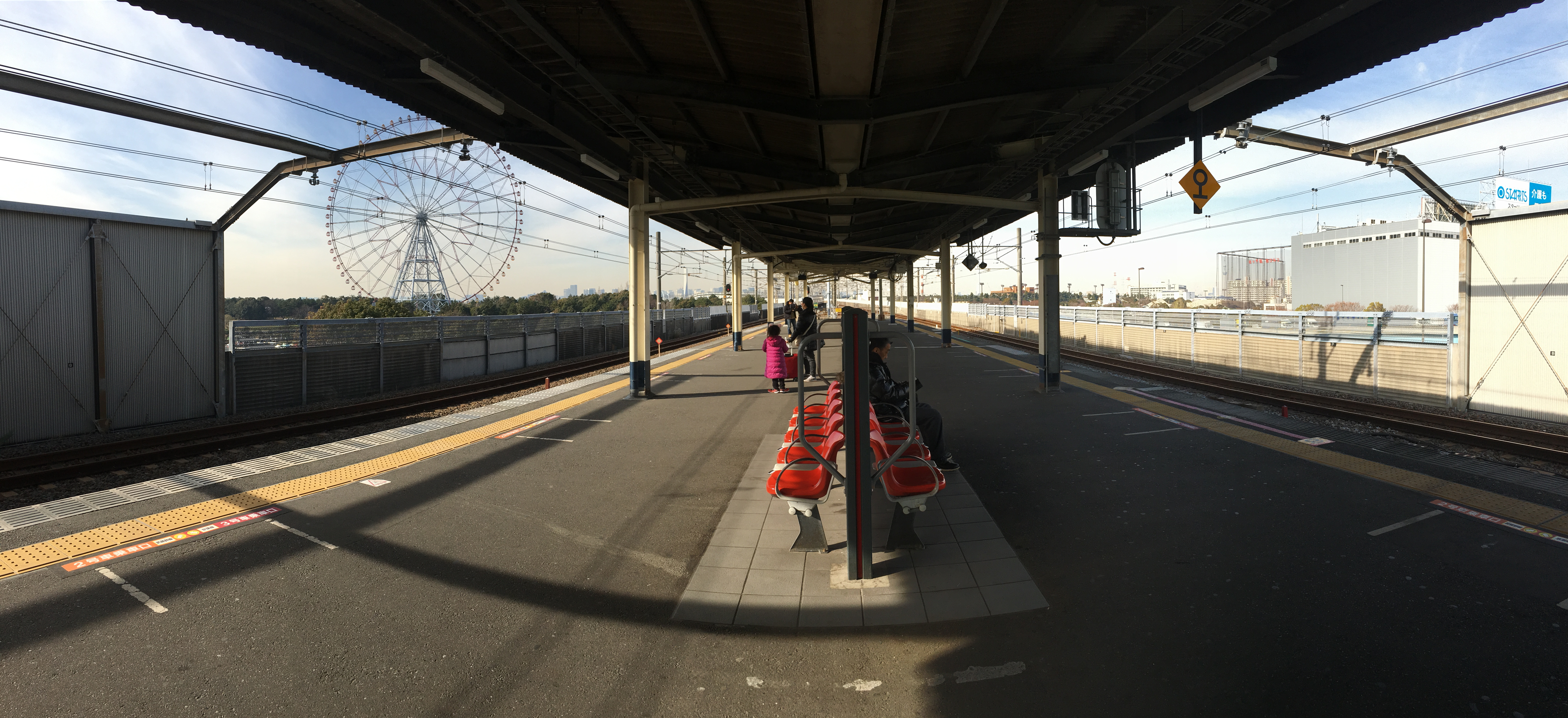
Platforms, 2019

Kasai-Rinkai Park Station (葛西臨海公園駅, Kasai-Rinkai-kōen-eki) is a railway station on the Keiyō Line in Edogawa, Tokyo, Japan, operated by the East Japan Railway Company (JR East).

== Lines ==
Kasai-Rinkai Park Station is served by the Keiyō Line from Tokyo. Only local (all stations) Keiyō Line services stop at this station. Musashino Line through services to and from Fuchūhommachi also stop here.

== Station layout ==
The elevated station consists of an island platform serving two tracks, with outer passing tracks on either side to allow non-stop trains to overtake stopping trains.

=== Platforms ===
| 1 | Keiyō Line | for Maihama, Kaihimmakuhari, and Soga |
| 1 | Musashino Line through service | for Nishi-Funabashi, Shim-Matsudo, and Fuchūhommachi |
| 2 | Keiyō Line | for Shin-Kiba and Tokyo |

== History ==
The station opened on 1 December 1988.

Station numbering was introduced in 2016 with Kasai Rinkai Park being assigned station number JE06.

== Passenger statistics ==
In fiscal 2011, the station was used by an average of 11,644 passengers daily (boarding passengers only). The passenger figures for previous years are as shown below.

| Fiscal year | Daily average |
|---|---|
| 2000 | 9,566 |
| 2005 | 11,602 |
| 2010 | 11,998 |
| 2011 | 11,644 |

== Surrounding area ==
- Kasai Rinkai Park, after which the station is named
- Edogawa Stadium
- Metropolitan Central Wholesale Market
- National Route 357

=== Kasai Rinkai Park ===
The station is located at the entrance to Kasai Rinkai Park, a municipal park featuring the Diamond and Flower Ferris Wheel, Tokyo Sea Life Park and a bird sanctuary.

== See also ==
- List of railway stations in Japan
