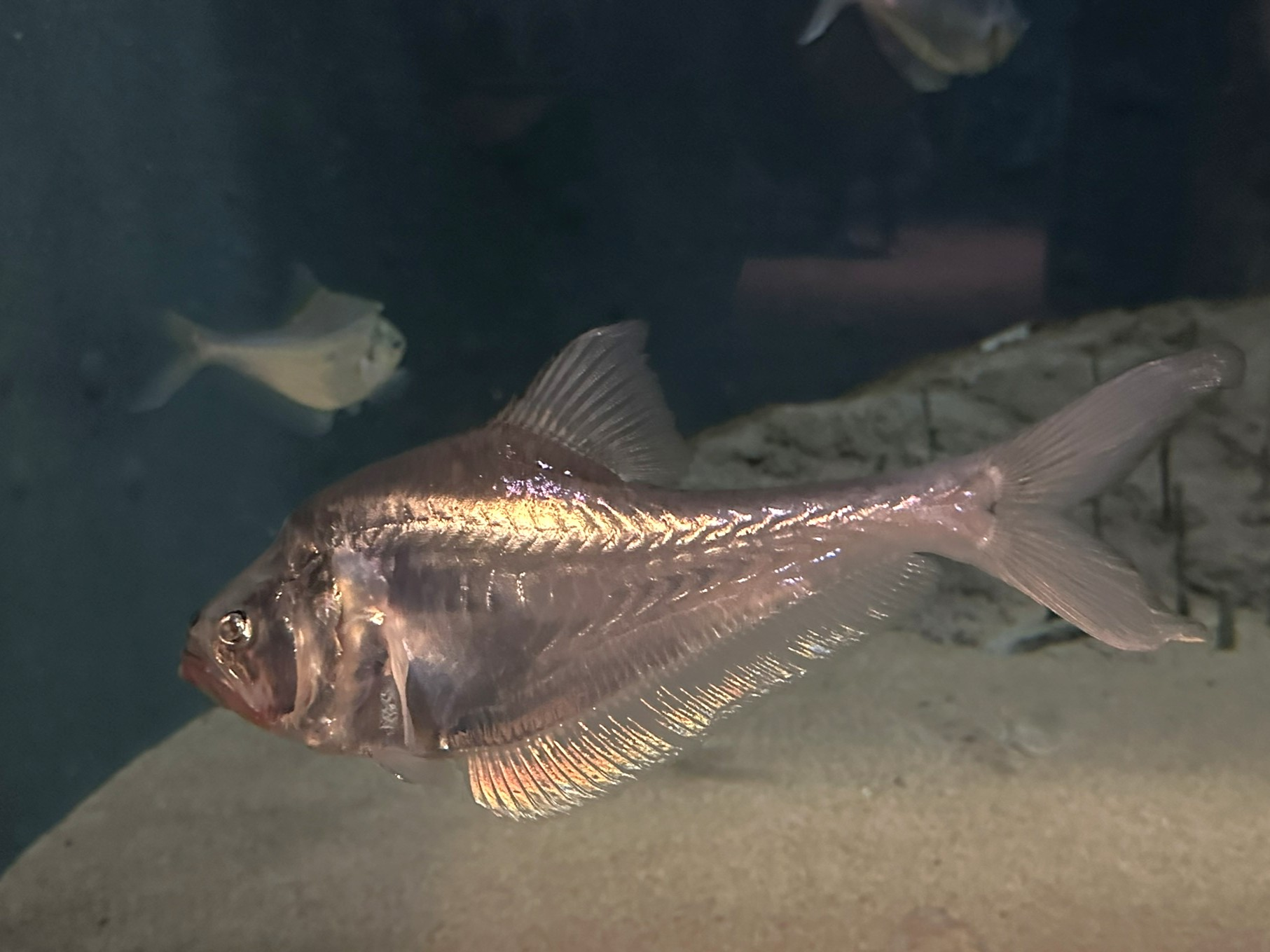
- Female (foreground) and male (background) Kurtus gulliveri

Scientific classification
- Kingdom: Animalia
- Phylum: Chordata
- Class: Actinopterygii
- Division: Teleostei
- Order: Gobiiformes
- Suborder: Apogonoidei
- Family: Kurtidae; Bleeker, 1859
- Genus: Kurtus; Bloch, 1786

Type species
- Kurtus indicus Bloch, 1786

Synonyms
- Cyrtus Minding, 1832; Curtus (misspelling)

= Kurtus =

Genus of fishes

Kurtus is a genus of percomorph fishes, called the nurseryfishes, forehead brooders, or incubator fish, native to fresh, brackish and coastal marine waters ranging from India, through southeast Asia, to New Guinea and northern Australia. Kurtus is currently the only known genus in the family Kurtidae, one of two families in the order Kurtiformes. They are famous for carrying their egg clusters on hooks protruding from the forehead (supraoccipital) of the males, although this only has been documented in K. gulliveri and available evidence strongly suggests this is not done by K. indicus (where the hook likely also is too small to carry embryos). Females do not have a hook.

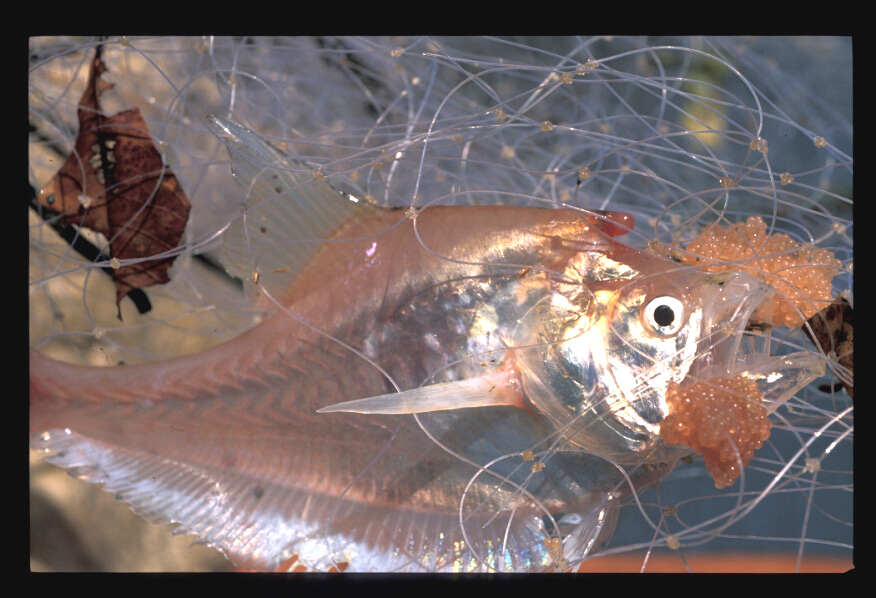
Male nurseryfish with embryos - photographed inside net by Time M. Berra

In addition to the egg hook, the kurtid gas bladder is enclosed in a tubular bony structure evolved from the ribs. In both species, the back is elevated into a hump shape.

Despite their unusual reproductive habits, little is known about these species. Historically, they have proven very difficult to keep alive in aquaria, although recent success with K. gulliveri has been achieved by Tokyo Sea Life Park in Japan.

== Species ==
The currently recognized species in this genus are:

- Kurtus gulliveri Castelnau, 1878 (nurseryfish)
- Kurtus indicus Bloch, 1786 (Indian humphead)
