= Tim Berra =

Tim Berra may refer to:

- Tim Berra (American football) (born 1951), American football player
- Tim Berra (biologist) (born 1943), American biologist
