= Ōigawa =

Ōigawa or Oigawa (Japanese: 大井川 or 大堰川, "Ōi River") is a Japanese family name and a toponym. It may refer to:

- Kazuhiko Ōigawa, a Japanese politician and the current governor of Ibaraki Prefecture
- Ōigawa, Shizuoka, a former town in Shizuoka Prefecture, Japan
- Ōigawa Railway, a railway company in Shizuoka Prefecture, Japan
  - Ōigawa Main Line, a Japanese railway line which connects Kanaya Station in Shimada with Senzu Station in Kawanehon (both in Shizuoka Prefecture)
- Ōi River (in Japanese: Ōi-gawa), a river in Shizuoka Prefecture, Japan
  - Ōigawa Dam, a dam on the Ōi River

== See also ==
- Oikawa
