= Tokyo Sea Life Park =

Public aquarium in Edogawa Ward, Tokyo

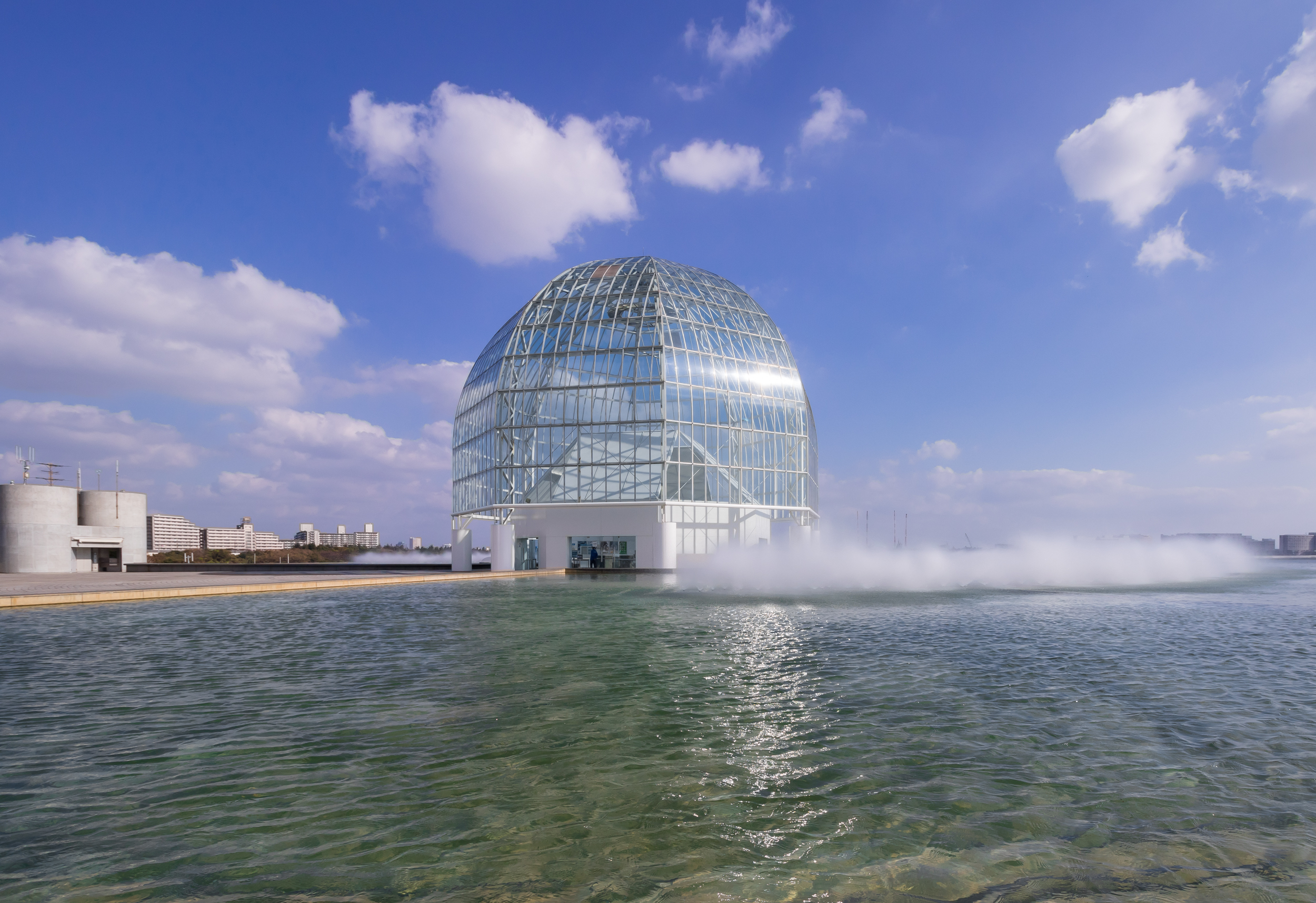
- Interactive map of Tokyo Sea Life Park
- 35.6399°N 139.8622°E
- Date opened: 10 October 1989
- Location: Kasai Rinkai Park, Tokyo
- Land area: 15,799 m^{2} (170,060 sq ft)
- No. of animals: 85,000
- No. of species: 940
- Volume of largest tank: 2,200,000 litres (581,000 US gal)
- Total volume of tanks: 4,600,000 litres (1,215,000 US gal)
- Annual visitors: 2 Million
- Memberships: JAZA
- Major exhibits: Pacific bluefin tuna, giant kelp
- Management: Tokyo Zoological Park Society
- Public transit: Kasai-Rinkai Park Station
- Website: www.tokyo-zoo.net/english/kasai/index.html

Tokyo Sea Life Park (葛西臨海水族園, kasai-rinkai-suizoku-en) is a public aquarium located in Kasai Rinkai Park, Edogawa Ward, Tokyo. Its predecessor was the Ueno Aquarium in the Ueno Zoo. The building was designed by Yoshio Taniguchi. The aquarium is accredited as a museum-equivalent facility under the Museum Act of the Japanese Ministry of Education, Culture, Sports, Science and Technology.

The park can be accessed from Kasai-Rinkai Park Station on the Keiyō Line.

== History ==
Tokyo Sea Life Park has its origins in the Uonozoki (literally "fish-viewing room"), the first public aquarium in Japan that opened in 1882. This public aquarium existed only during a temporary exposition and was closed after the exposition ended. Afterwards, the Uonozoki was demolished.

In 1929, the Ueno Aquarium was opened in the same location at Ueno Zoo. In 1952, the aquarium started breeding saltwater fish based on the experimental results of filtration equipment. The New Ueno Aquarium was subsequently opened in 1964. The aquarium started to use acrylic glass for large tanks in earnest. In 1964, acrylic panels with a height of 2 metres (6.6 ft), a width of 18 metres (59 ft), and a thickness of 7 centimetres (2.8 in) were installed.

In commemoration of the centenary of Ueno Zoo, a plan was unveiled to build the largest aquarium in Japan. The new aquarium officially opened in 1989 as Tokyo Sea Life Park. All specimens kept in the Ueno Aquarium, which subsequently closed, were inherited by Tokyo Sea Life Park.

== Overview ==
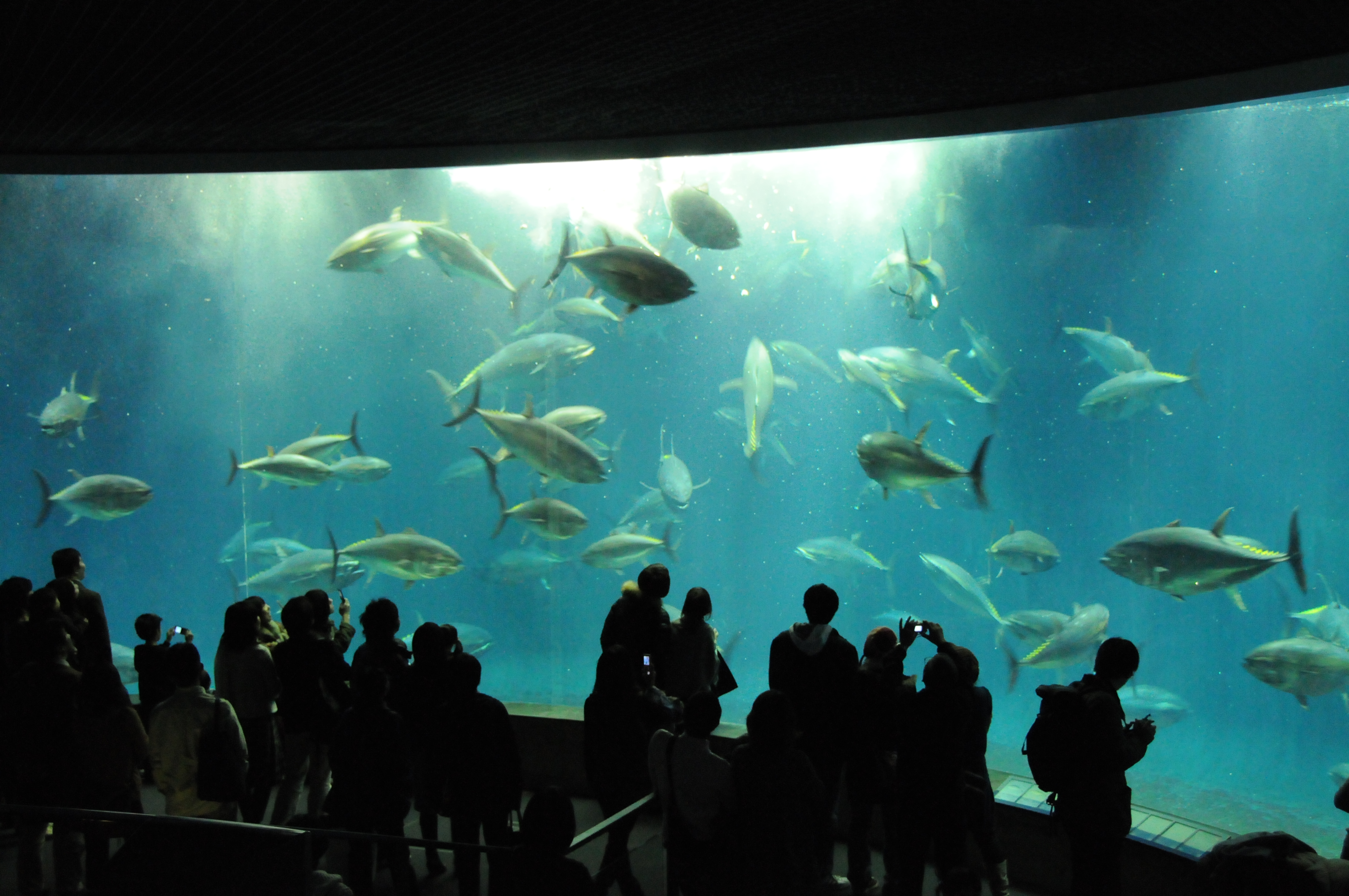
Visitors at the tuna tank

Approximately 650 species are kept in 47 tanks, including tuna that inhabit a large, round tank with a viewing area in its center.

When the park opened, it was the largest and most popular public aquarium in Japan. The annual number of visitors in the first year of the park reached 3.55 million, far exceeding the Japanese record at that time (2.4 million at Suma Aqualife Park in 1987). The record was not broken again until the opening of the Osaka Aquarium.

Tokyo Sea Life Park held the world's first successful exhibition of nurseryfish. In addition, many of the species on exhibit are directly and locally collected by the Research Section of the Breeding and Exhibition Division. Rare species can be seen here, especially from polar regions.

Admission is free on the following days: May 4 (Greenery Day), October 1 (Tokyo Citizen's Day), and October 10 (Tokyo Sea Life Park's anniversary).

=== Renewal ===
As the facility is ageing after more than 30 years in existence, considerations are underway for a new facility. The park solicited opinions from the citizens of Tokyo at the end of 2018. In January 2019, the park formulated a basic plan for a new facility on the premises. In February 2020, a group of experts approved the plan report. The expansion is expected to have a total floor area of about 22,500 square metres, with maintenance costs of 24 to 27 billion yen. A business plan was to be proposed by the end of 2020, with the new aquarium expected to open in 2026.

== Exhibits ==
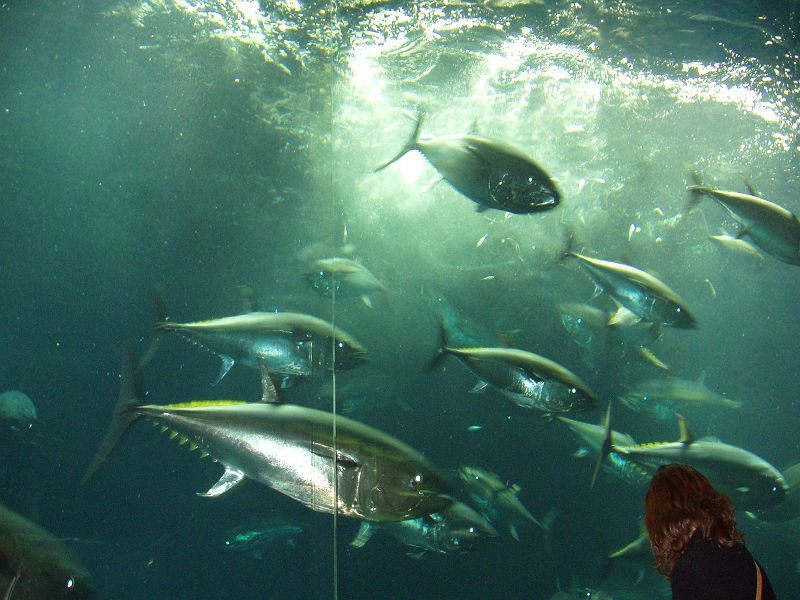
Pacific bluefin tuna

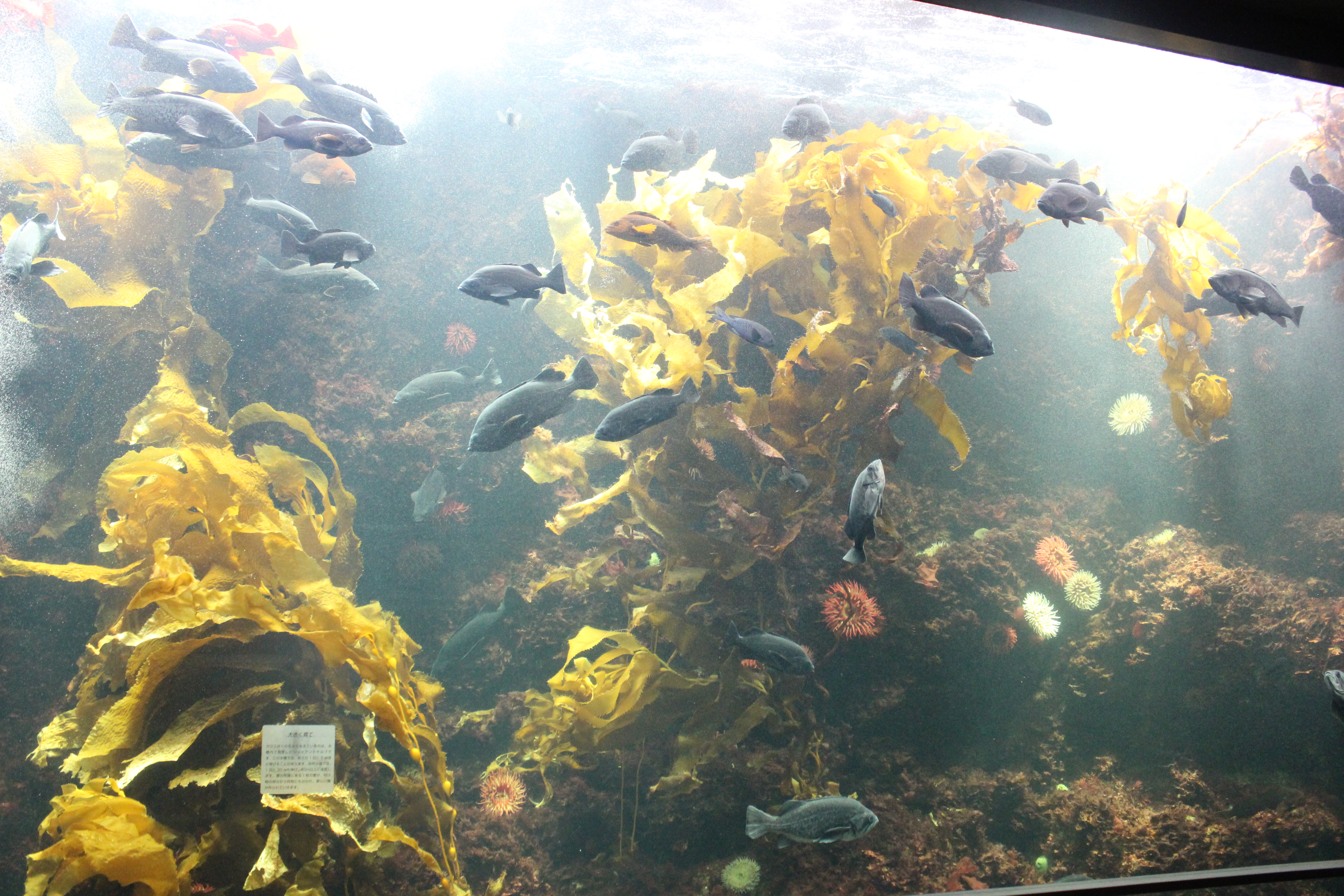
Seaweed forest

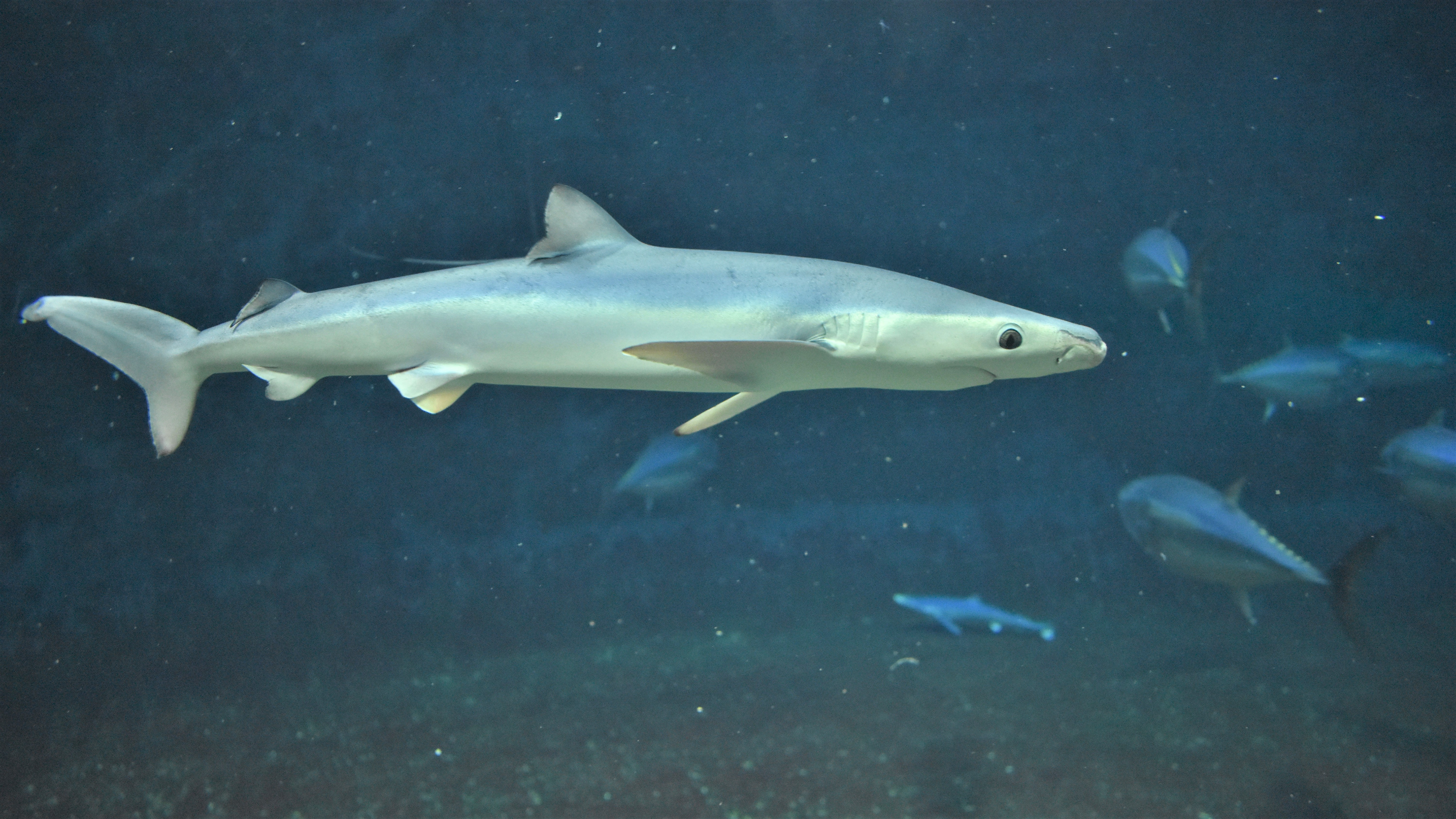
Blue shark

Although the park is large with many exhibits, displays only used to show the names and pictures of species in each tank. As a service improvement, digital photo frame panels with commentary were added next to tanks in May 2011. There are also photo guides and rooms with specialised tour staff.

The park was the first aquarium in Japan to successfully house Pacific bluefin tuna and scalloped hammerheads in long-term captivity.

The park has also established a method for growing seaweed that require high water quality, water flow, and sufficient light, such as giant kelp, in a closed indoor tank. Tokyo Sea Life Park maintains friendly ties with Monterey Bay Aquarium in regards to kelp exhibition.

In 1999, the park acquired two blue sharks which inhabited their tanks for 210 and 246 days. This was the longest captivity record for this species, until the park was overtaken by the Sendai Umino-Mori Aquarium. In 2020, the park introduced two more blue sharks and kept them for five months.

- Oceanic Exhibits
  - Second floor
    - A group of rays, sardines, and sharks, including scalloped hammerheads and blacktip reef sharks, are on display here. In the past, pelagic threshers and bonnetheads were also present.
  - First floor
    - Voyagers of the Sea – A ring-shaped 2,200 m^{3} (580,000 US gal) tank. It was the largest indoor tank in Japan when it was built in 1989. The tank connects to the second floor, but kept separate from the other tanks there. Pacific bluefin tuna, mackerel tuna, striped bonito, flapnose rays, bowmouth guitarfish, and scalloped hammerheads are among the species housed here. It is also occasionally home to other species such as blue sharks, ocean sunfish, Indo-Pacific sailfish, longtail tuna, tiger sharks, and shortfin mako sharks. Seats are installed in the Aqua Theater so visitors can sit and observe the display.
    - Oceans of the World – The exhibits are divided by body of water, with unique tanks for the South China Sea (spot-fin porcupinefish, bluestreak cleaner wrasse, whitemargin unicornfish), Great Barrier Reef (Valentin's sharpnose puffer, Indian Ocean (sea goldie, spotted moray eel), Australia (weedy seadragon, old wife), Caribbean, Mediterranean Sea (painted comber), North Sea (lumpsucker), deep sea (John Dory, salmon snailfish, sea toad, splendid alfonsino, spotted ratfish), Arctic Ocean and Antarctic Ocean. In the past, goblin sharks and Pacific pomfrets have been housed in the deep sea tank.
    - Nagisa Species – Flathead grey mullets, red seabreams, common octopuses, amefurashi, etc. A touch-tank with starfish and sea urchins can also be found here. On special occasions, sharks, such as bullhead sharks, are placed in the interactive area.
    - Penguin Ecology – In this section, Humboldt penguins, king penguins, southern rockhopper penguins, and little penguins are kept outdoors. King and rockhopper penguins are vulnerable to the heat, and these species are kept indoors with a cooling facility in the summer. The cooling area is not open to the public.
    - Seaweed Forest – An exhibition featuring giant kelp.
    - Tokyo's ocean – Organisms from the Ogasawara Islands, Seven Islands of Izu, and Tokyo Bay are displayed separately. Pagrus major, Spiny red gurnards, etc. are also kept in this section.
    - Seabird Ecology – An exhibition featuring seabirds, such as common murres and tufted puffins.
- Freshwater Exhibits
  - This area houses freshwater Japanese species such as Oikawa, Iwana, Yamame, and killifish.

== Research and conservation ==
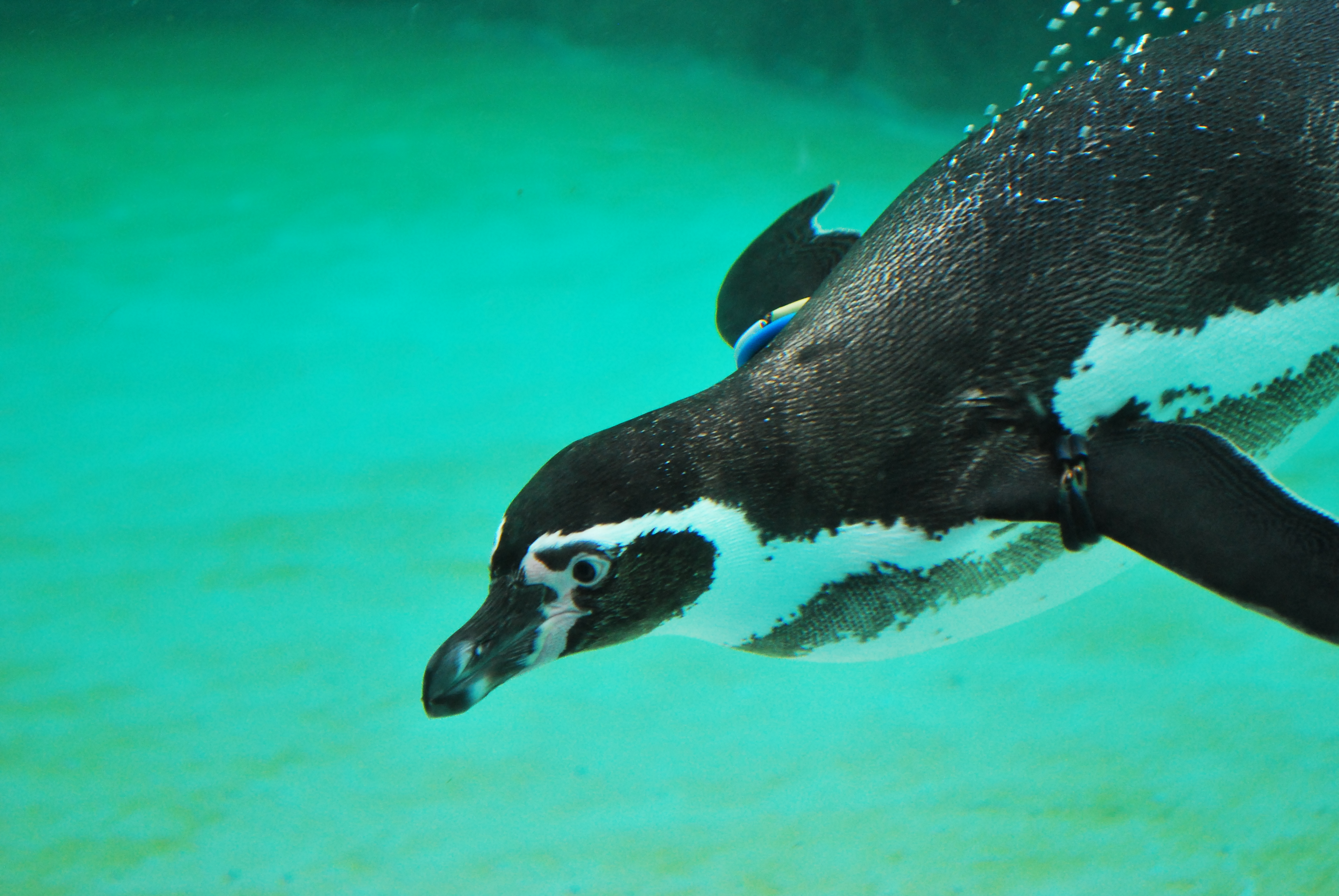
Humboldt penguin

At Tokyo Sea Life Park, staff work on the conservation and breeding of both Japanese and foreign rare species.

- Foreign species: Humboldt penguins, fairy penguins, etc.
- Domestic species: Japanese fire belly newts, Shuttles hoppfish, Tokyo-area amphibians (Tokyo salamanders, Japanese wrinkled frogs, Japanese brown frogs), Japanese Oryzias, Acheilognathus typus, Chaetodon daedalma, etc.

In 2007, the park also succeeded in the breeding of leafy seadragons. The Japanese fire belly newt is also housed at Ueno Zoo, Tama Zoological Park, and Inokashira Park Zoo, with the four institutions working together on conservation efforts. The results of zoological research in a wide range of fields are utilised for exhibitions. Tokyo Sea Life Park conducts surveys and research on the breeding of aquatic organisms by accumulating data on feeding routines, habitats, and breeding environments, as well as inspections and dissections of dead individuals. The park also works on the captive breeding of bluefin tuna, and spawning was confirmed for the first time in captivity in 2014.

Tokyo Sea Life Park continuously monitors the natural environment in Tokyo. It conducts joint research of water quality maintenance technologies (such as denitrification) with private companies, and researches improving breeding environment technologies.

=== Ocellated Icefish ===
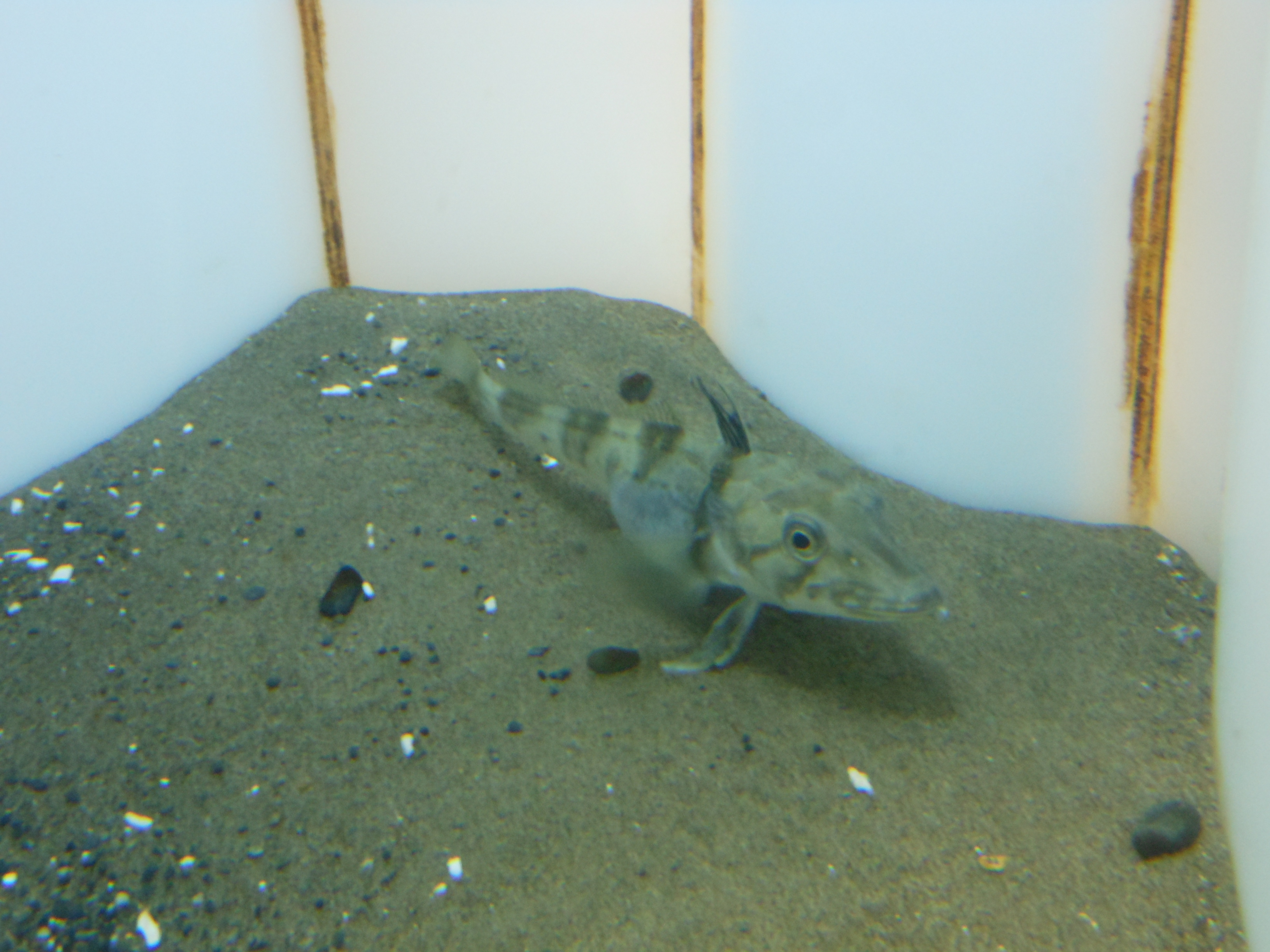
Ocellated Icefish

On February 12, 2013, the ocellated icefish (Chionodraco rastrospinosus) spawned in captivity for the first time on record. About 500 eggs, each with a diameter of about 4.5 mm, were laid. Although the gestation period was unknown, the park speculated the eggs would take six months to hatch, like other Antarctic fish species. The first egg subsequently hatched in May of the same year. This was the first time an ocellated icefish had been bred in captivity.

== Accidents and incidents ==
=== Penguin escape ===
On March 3, 2012, a Humboldt penguin kept at the park escaped into Tokyo Bay. On May 24 of the same year, the penguin was found at the foot of Gyotoku Bridge. The penguin was safely returned to the park and went back on exhibit on June 7.

=== Mass tuna death incident ===
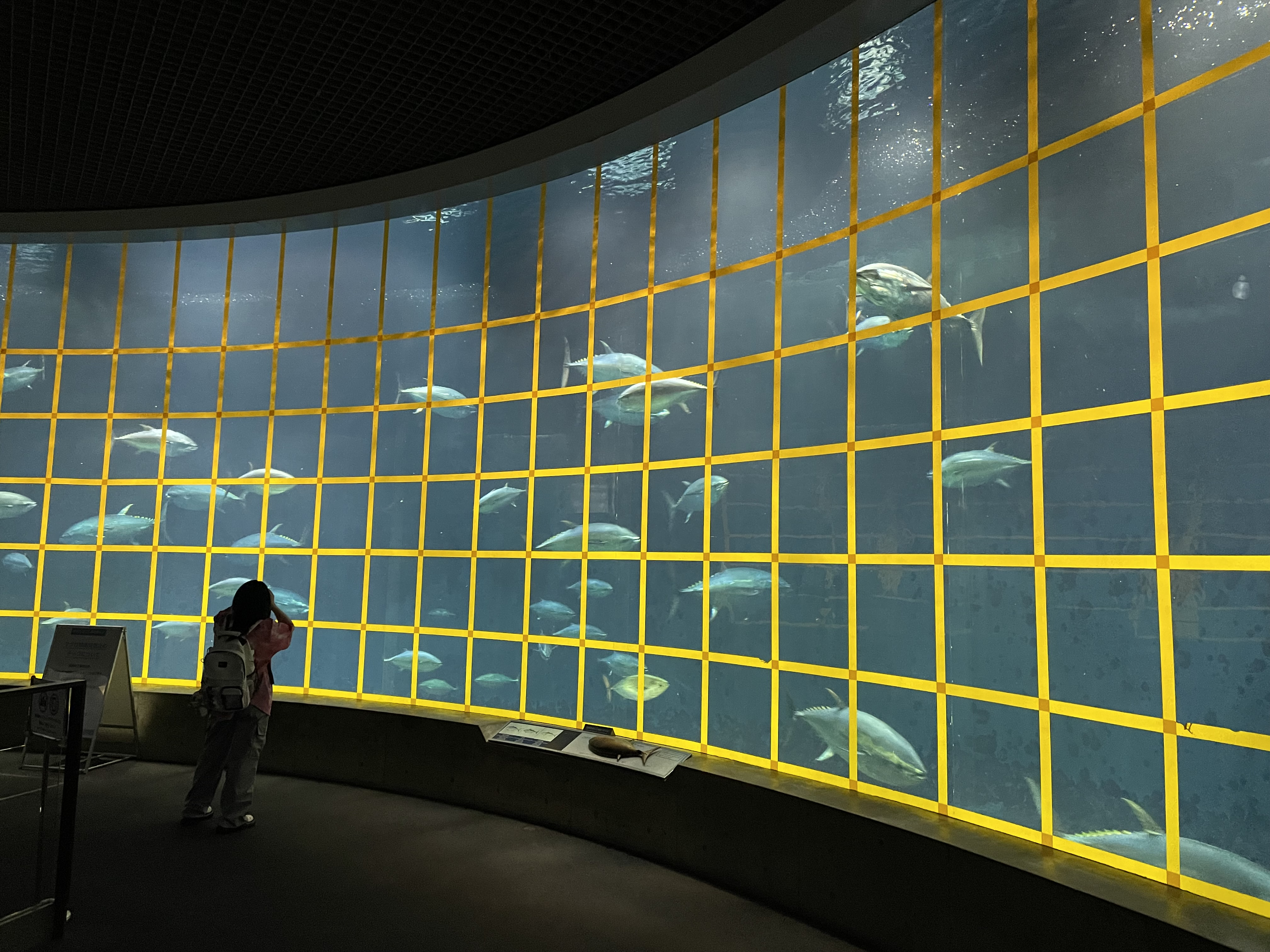
Yellow tape is regularly applied to prevent collisions by tuna and other fish.

On December 1, 2014, 63 bluefin tuna, 67 mackerel tuna, and 35 striped bonito were kept in a large tank for migratory fish. Starting in that month, these fish died rapidly, one after another. The mackerel tuna were wiped out by January 18, 2015, and the striped bonito on January 26. By January 26, only 3 bluefin tuna were left in the tank. While the cause has not been determined, pathological tests revealed a virus in the spleen cells of bluefin tuna and mackerel tuna.

One more bluefin tuna died on February 25, and another on March 24, leaving only one remaining. In April 2016, the park announced the final results of its investigation, which indicated that the mass mortality was not caused by a single factor, but by the combined effects of multiple direct and indirect factors.

After consultation with various experts, measures were taken to address animal safety in the tank and prevent future incidents. More tuna were also brought into the park. The current population in the tank has returned to a pre-2014 level, and is considered stable.

== See also ==
- Ueno Zoo
- Aquamarine Fukushima
- Diamond and Flower Ferris Wheel
- National Museum of Nature and Science
