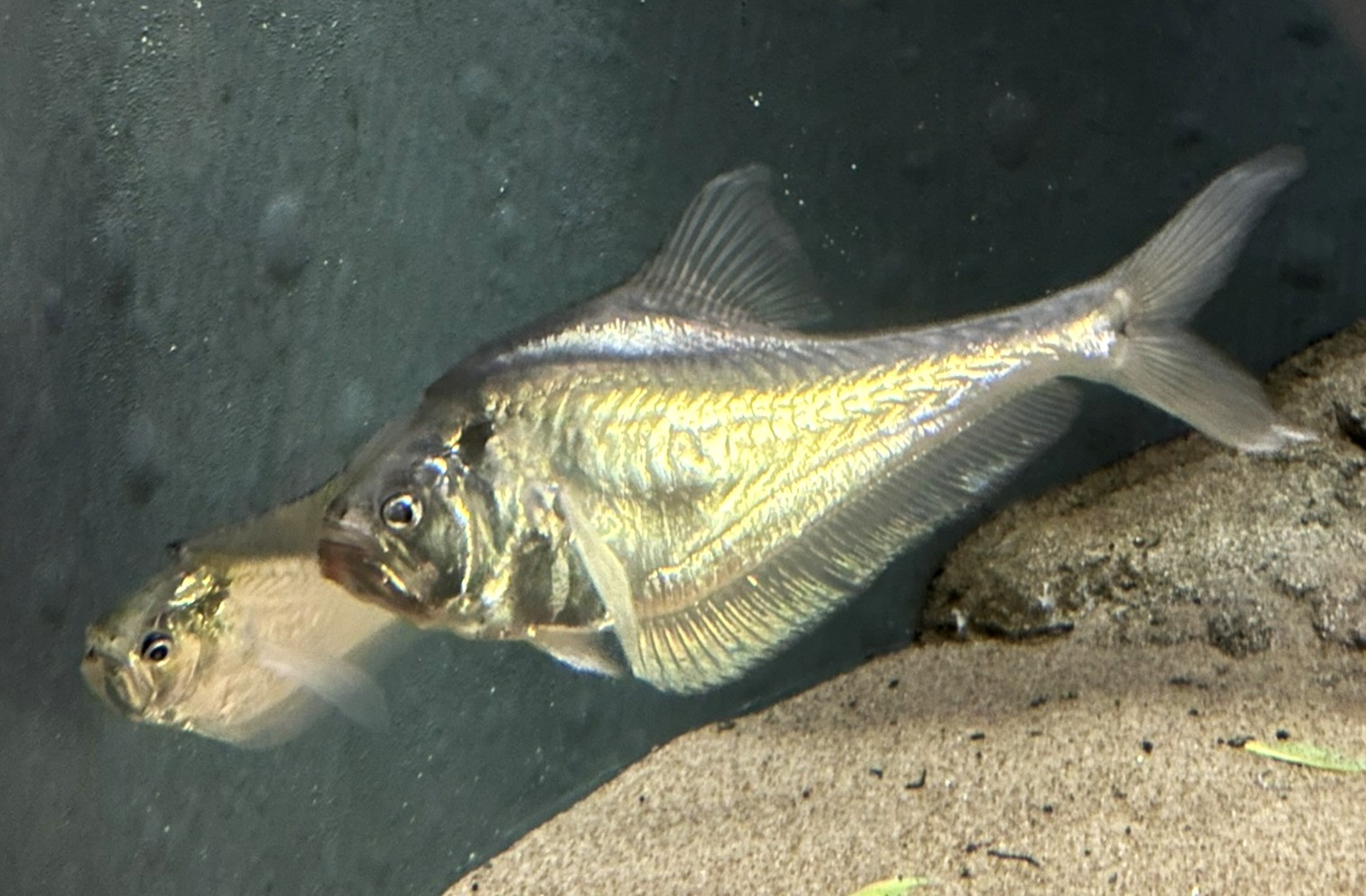
- Male (left) and female (right) at Tokyo Sea Life Park

Conservation status
- Least Concern (IUCN 3.1)

Scientific classification
- Kingdom: Animalia
- Phylum: Chordata
- Class: Actinopterygii
- Division: Teleostei
- Order: Gobiiformes
- Family: Kurtidae
- Genus: Kurtus
- Species: K. gulliveri

Binomial name
- Kurtus gulliveri Castelnau, 1878

= Kurtus gulliveri =

Species of fish

Kurtus gulliveri, the nurseryfish, breakfast-fish, humphead or incubator Fish, is a species of freshwater ray-finned fish belonging to the family Kurtidae, the nurseryfishes. This fish is found in New Guinea and northern Australia. This species is famous for its unusual breeding strategy where the male carries the egg cluster on a hook protruding from the forehead (supraoccipital).

== Taxonomy ==
Kurtus gulliveri was firs formally described in 1878 by the French diplomat and zoologist François-Louis Laporte, comte de Castelnau with its type locality given as a pond near the Norman River, Gulf of Carpentaria, Australia. The nurseryfish is on of two species in the gneus Kurtus which was described by Marcus Elieser Bloch in 1790 when he described the only other species in the genus Kurtus indicus, its type species by monotypy. This genus is the only one in the monogenereic family Kurtidae, although some authorities state that this should be a subfamily of the cardinalfish family Apogonidae. The Kurtidae and the Apogonidae make up the suborder Kurtoidei in the order Gobiiformes, which also includes the sand divers and gobies.

== Etymology ==
Kurtus gulliveri is one of ony two species in the genus Kurtus, a name which is a Latinisatiion of cyrtus, meaning "humped", an allusion to the very concex dorsal profile of these fishes. The specific name, gullveri, is an eponym, the name honours "Mr Gulliver", the collector of the holotype but Castelnau did go into any further detail, it is thought to be Thomas Allen Gulliver, a postal and telegraph worker who had a home near the Norman River and who collected natural histrory specimens.

== Description ==
Kurtus gullveri reaches a maximum total length of63 cm (25 in). Its body is very deep towards the head and becomes slendere towards the tail. There are 7 spines and 11 to 15 soft rays in the cintinuous dorsal fin and 2 spines and between 40 and 48 soft rays in the long-based anal fin. There is on obvious hump on the forehead, the males possess a distinctive hook-like process on the forehead used for bearing the eggs. The females do not have this hook. The eye is small, the mouth is oblique and protractile, reaching the level of the eye in juveniles, but extends past eye in larger adults. There are very fine bands of villiform teeth on the outside of both the upper and lower jaws. It has a naked head but the body and gill cover are covered in tiny cycloid scales. The caudal fin shows a clear fork.

== Distribution and habitat ==
Kurtus gulliveri is found in northern Australia and New Guinea. In northern Australia it is found in the larger coastal rivers in the Gulf of Carpentaria and Timor drainages patchily from the Pentecost River in Western Australia north and east to the Norman River in Queensland. In southern New Guinea the nurseryfish is more widespread. It is found in slow-moving, turbid waters, frequently being encountered in the lower reaches of large rivers in brackish water, in mangroves. This species occurs in the estuarine and freshwater parts of rivers.

== Biology ==
Kurtus gulliveri is considered euryhaline In a study of its morphology, 159 specimens were examined and the largest was 33 cm (13 in), while the average was 14 cm (5.5 in). Their spawning season is thought to be from June to January. It feeds on crustaceans (especially prawn and shrimp), small fish and insect larvae.

== Utilisation ==
Kurtus gulliveri is well regarded as food.
