= Kasai Rinkai Park =

Park in Edogawa, Tokyo, Japan

Coordinates: 35.642°N 139.860°E

- 葛西臨海公園
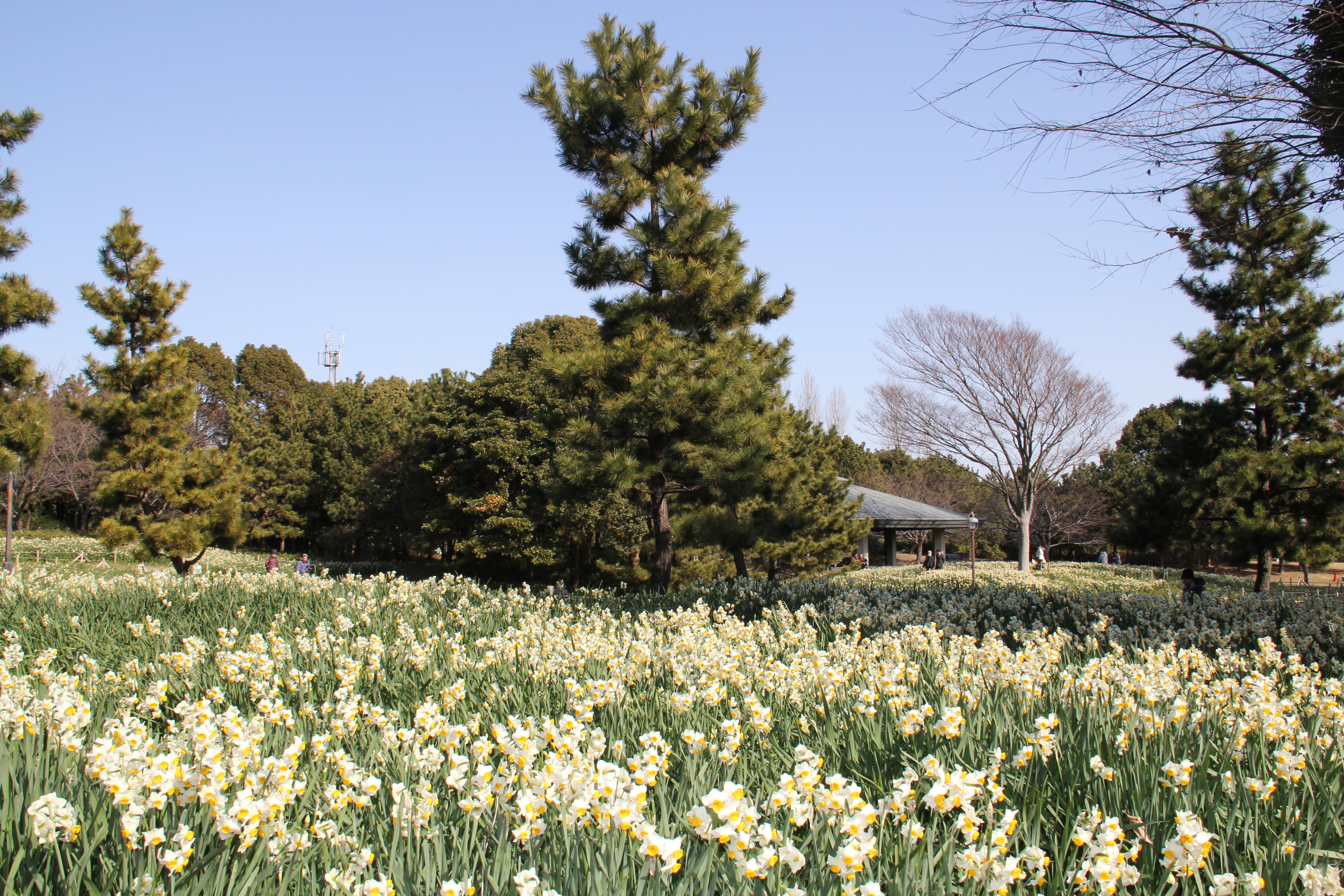
- Interactive map of Kasai Rinkai Park
- Location: Edogawa, Tokyo, Japan
- Area: 805,861.13 square metres (199.13262 acres)
- Created: 1989
- Operator: Tokyo Metropolitan Park Association

Ramsar Wetland
- Official name: Kasai Marine Park
- Designated: 18 October 2018
- Reference no.: 2357

Kasai Rinkai Park (Japanese: 葛西臨海公園, Hepburn: Kasai Rinkai Kōen) is a park in Edogawa, Tokyo, Japan, which officially opened on 1 June 1989. The park includes a bird sanctuary and the Tokyo Sea Life Park aquarium, as well as the Diamond and Flower Ferris Wheel (formerly the second-tallest ferris wheel in the world). It was built on reclaimed land which includes two manmade islands, an observation deck and a hotel. It is the second-largest park in the 23 wards of Tokyo (after Mizumoto Park).

The 117-metre (384 ft) tall Diamond and Flower Ferris Wheel opened at the park in 2001. On a clear day, it affords views of Tokyo Bay, Chiba, Edogawa, Tokyo Disneyland, and Mount Fuji. It is reportedly the second tallest Ferris wheel in Japan.

About a third of the park is designated a sea bird sanctuary, which houses a Sea Bird Centre that provides information on the local bird species. The park also has two beaches on artificial islands. The west island is connected to land by the Kasai Nagisa bridge and is a popular place for recreation. The east island is closed to the public as a protected bird habitat and Ramsar site since 2018.

The park is always crowded during the 'hanami' period of spring, when the Japanese party under cherry trees in bloom.

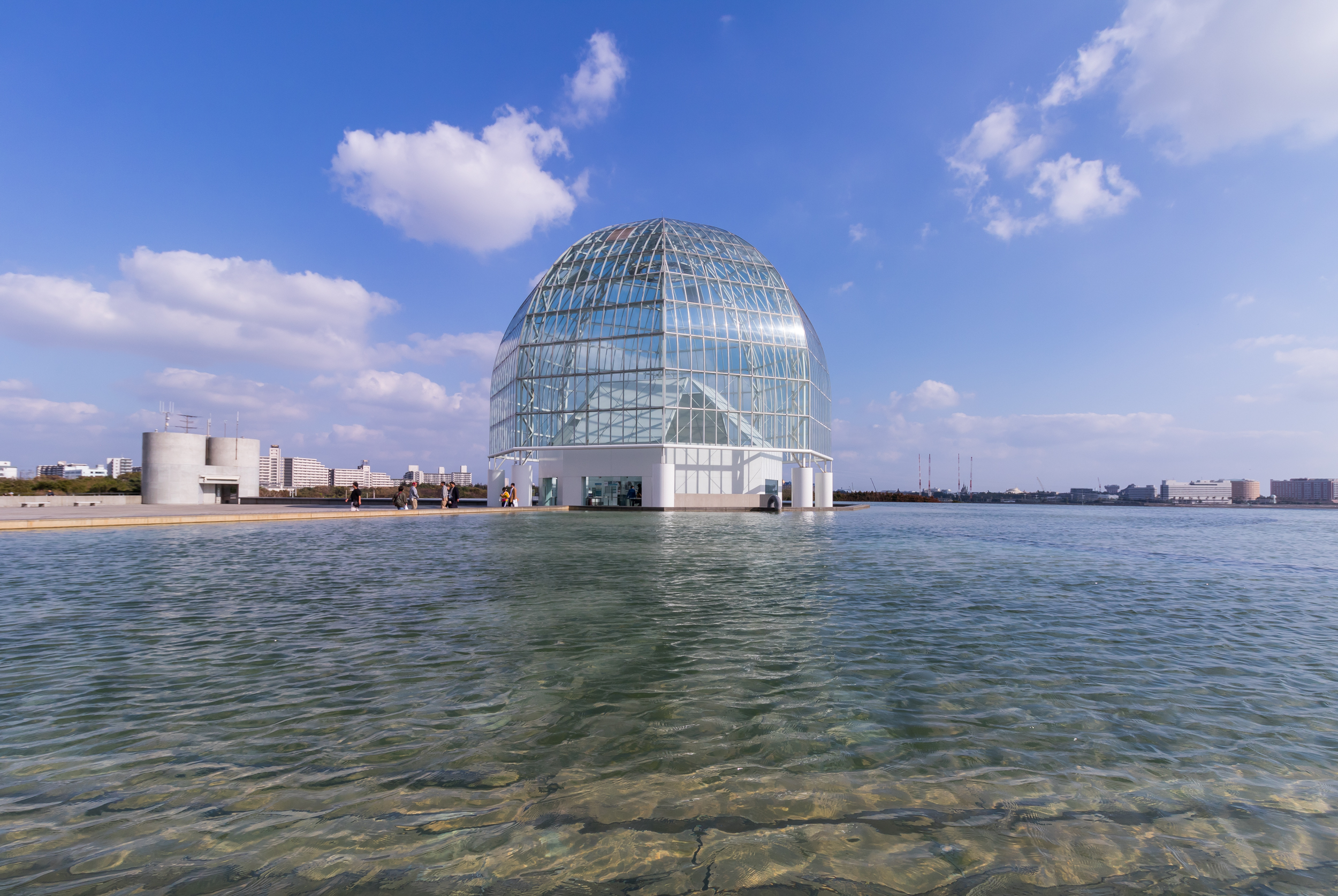
Tokyo Sea Life Park aquarium

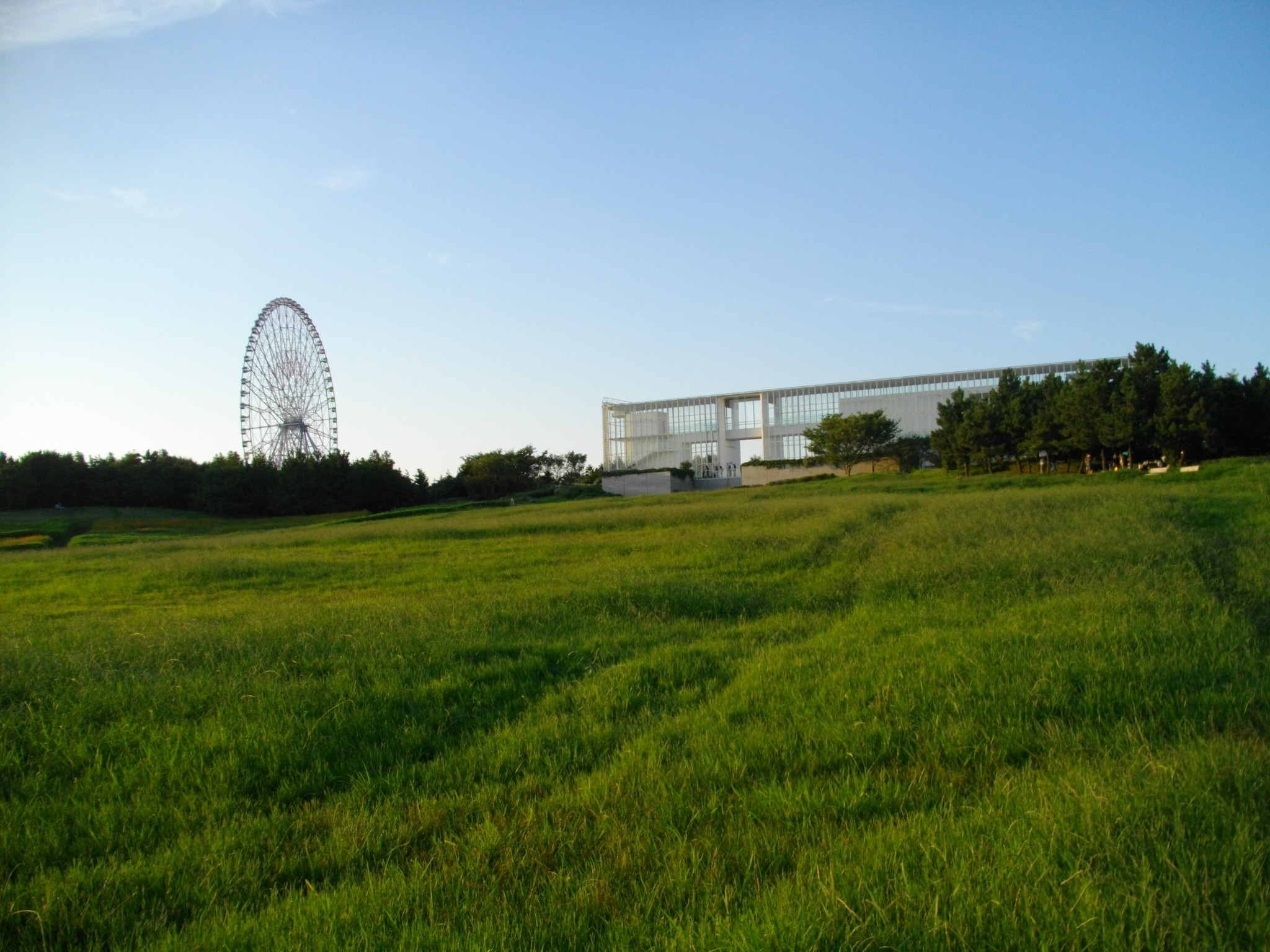
ferris wheel and observation deck

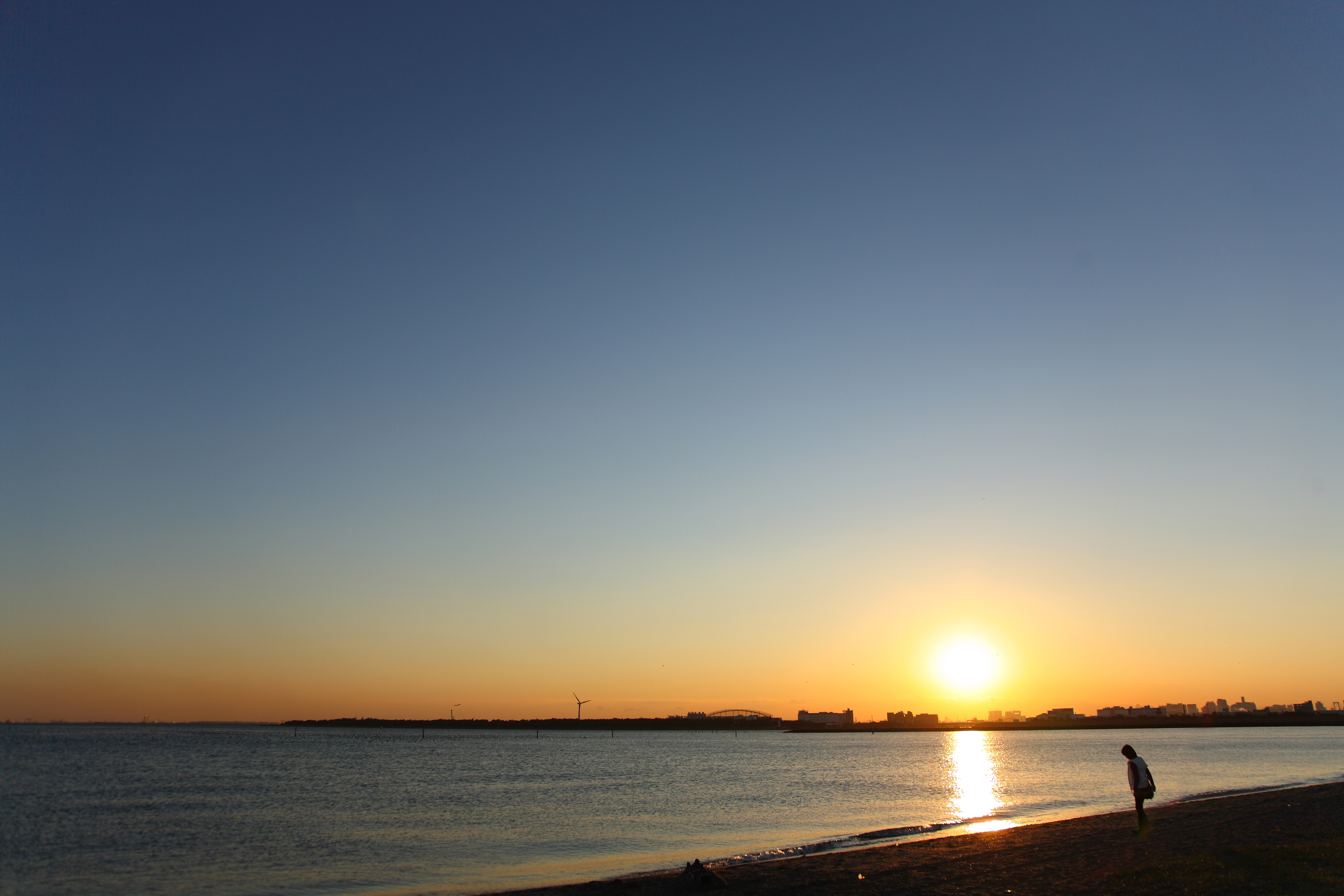
Sunset on the beach

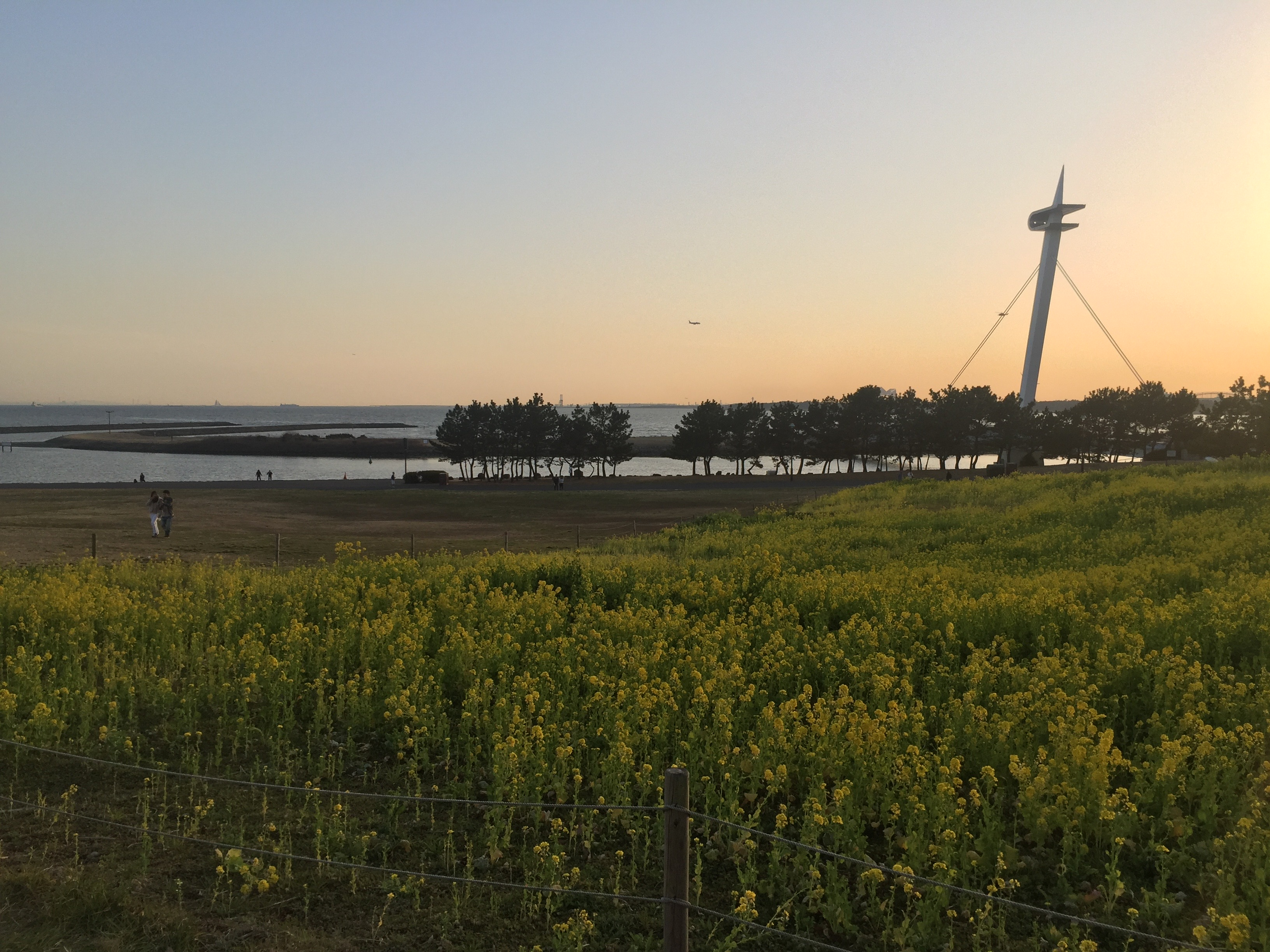
Kasai-Nagisa Bridge

== Access ==
The park is served by Kasai-Rinkai Park Station of the East Japan Railway Company (JR East).

The park is passed through by water bus which is named as Tokyo Mizube Cruising Line and from/to Odaiba Seaside Park, Hama Rikyu and Asakusa Station.
