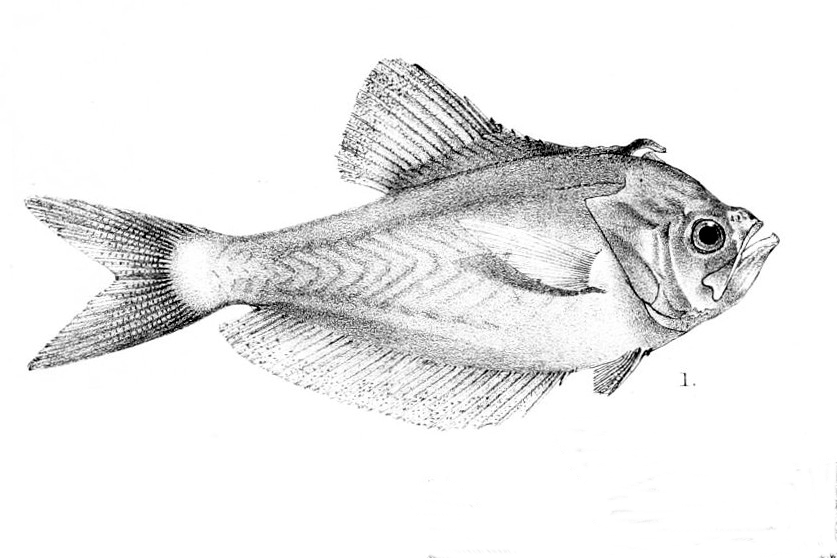
- male

Scientific classification
- Kingdom: Animalia
- Phylum: Chordata
- Class: Actinopterygii
- Division: Teleostei
- Order: Gobiiformes
- Family: Kurtidae
- Genus: Kurtus
- Species: K. indicus

Binomial name
- Kurtus indicus Bloch, 1786

Synonyms
- Zeus kyrtus Forster, 1795; Kurtus blochianus Lacépède, 1800; Kurtus macrolepidotus Bloch & Schneider, 1801; Kurtus cornutus Cuvier, 1829; Kurtus blochii Cuvier & Valenciennes, 1833

= Kurtus indicus =

Species of fish

Kurtus indicus, the Indian humphead, is a species of freshwater ray-finned fish belonging to the family Kurtidae, the nurseryfishes. This fish is found in India and southeast Asia.

== Taxonomy ==
Kurtus indicus was first formally described in 1786 by the German physician and naturalist Marcus Elieser Bloch with its type locality given as the Indian Ocean. When Bloch described this species he named the new genus Kurtus with K. indicus as its type species by monotypy. This genus is the only one in the monogenereic family Kurtidae, although some authorities state that this should be a subfamily of the cardinalfish family Apogonidae. The Kurtidae and the Apogonidae make up the suborder Kurtoidei in the order Gobiiformes, which also includes the sand divers and gobies.

== Etymology ==
Kurtus indicus is the type species of the genus Kurtius, a name which is a Latinisatiion of cyrtus, meaning "humped", an allusion to the very concex dorsal profile of these fishes. The specific name, indicus, means belonging to India. i.e. the Indian Ocean which was the type locality given by Bloch.

== Description ==
Kurtus indicus resembles the closely related K. gulliveri, the only other species in its genus, but is far smaller, only reaching a length of 12.6 cm (5.0 in). Although it has been suggested that the male carries the egg cluster on a hook protruding from the forehead, as known from K. gulliveri, available evidence strongly suggests this is not the case in K. indicus. Out of several thousand examined, none carried eggs in this manner and the male's hook is likely also too small. The female lacks the hook entirely.

== Distribution and habitat ==
Kurtus indicus is found in south Asia and southeast Asia in fresh and brackish water from India to Borneo, including the Andaman Islands.

== Utilisation ==
Kurtus indicus is of minor importance to local commercial fisheries.
