= Darwin and His Children =

2013 book by Tim Berra about the children of Charles Darwin

Darwin and His Children: His Other Legacy
- Author: Tim M. Berra
- Language: English
- Subject: Biography
- Publisher: Oxford University Press
- Publication date: August 2013
- Media type: Print (hardcover)
- Pages: 189
- ISBN: 978-0-19-930944-3
- Preceded by: Charles Darwin: The Concise Story of an Extraordinary Man (2009)
- Followed by: BOURBON: What the Educated Drinker Should Know (2019)

Darwin and His Children: His Other Legacy is a 2013 book by biologist and author, Tim Berra. The book examines the full lives of the ten children of Charles Darwin and his wife Emma Wedgwood. This book is written for a lay audience concluding with a timeline, cast of characters, references and index. An overview of Darwin's scientific achievements runs though the chronology of the children's lives. The book was published by Oxford University Press.

== Synopsis ==
The book is broken into twelve chapters. The first, "Darwin's Paradigm Shift", is described by reviewer Christopher Cumo as a good overview of Darwin for any history of science student, saying the book is able to "present the scaffolding of Darwin's ideas without requiring one to build the entire house". Chapter two covers Charles Darwin and his first-cousin soon to be wife, Emma Wedgwood, with whom he had been friends since childhood. Emma's father, Josiah Wedgwood, was brother to Charles's mother Susannah Wedgwood. The stress of believing this close family relationship was the reason so many of their ten children suffered from ill health, and the infertility of three adult children, was woven throughout chapters three to twelve. Darwin struggled with intestinal pain and an anxiety disorder all his life, exacerbated by stress and overwork, for which he often sought out a water cure.

At the beginning of each chapter which covers the full life of each of the ten children, Berra gives an overview of what Darwin was working on in the world of science and other important events. If the child outlived its parents, Berra then recounts those deaths from the perspective of that specific child.

== Reception ==
Science historian Marsha Richmond, reviewing the book in The Quarterly Review of Biology, explains that each chapter follows a different child's life, interspersed with what Darwin was working on at the time. Much has already been written about the life of Charles Darwin and his family, but it is the first time that a researcher has combined all the life stories of the children into one source. The entire life of the child, even Mary Eleanor who lived only three-weeks and his last child Charles Waring who lived 19-months are covered in their own chapter. The life and death of his first daughter Anne Elizabeth at the age of ten from consumption, "illustrates well the deep affection he had not only for Annie but for all of his children." Darwin, according to Berra, was consumed with anxiety that his marriage to his first cousin Emma Wedgwood was the reason for the children's poor health. Three of Darwin's sons became renowned scientists and "Berra demonstrates that the other Darwin children were interesting in their own right." This book is unique because Berra uses secondary sources to tell their stories, and in doing so "provides a collective family portrait."

Christopher Cumo, reviewing the book for the Ohio Journal of Science, states that Berra "has written something different ... [it] cuts across three disciplines: the sciences, history of science, and biography ... an accomplishment it is not easy to achieve." Using only secondary citations and many historical photographs and etchings, each chapter arranged in chronological order tells the full story of each of the ten children. The chapter on Annie, Darwin's favorite child who died at age ten from tuberculosis "extinguished whatever religious sentiments Darwin might still have held." Cumo would have liked to have seen more of their mother's influence in the book. Readers who will be drawn to this book will be people who already know quite a bit about the science of Darwin, but also people interested in biographies who "need not be a scientist" to enjoy this book. The children of Darwin have been overlooked and "[H]erein lies the book's contribution to scholarship". The book is "well researched and well written. Berra has the ability to communicate complex ideas in simple prose."

== See also ==
- Charles Darwin's children
- The Darwin-Wedgwood family
