= Takuma Oikawa =

Japanese shogi player

- Native name: 及川拓馬
- Born: May 6, 1987 (age 39)
- Hometown: Matsubushi, Saitama

Career
- Achieved professional status: October 1, 2007 (aged 20)
- Badge number: 268
- Rank: 7-dan
- Teacher: Hatasu Itō (8-dan)
- Meijin class: B2
- Ryūō class: 3

Websites
- JSA profile page

Takuma Oikawa (及川 拓馬, Oikawa Takuma; born May 6, 1987) is a Japanese professional shogi player ranked 7-dan.

== Early life and apprentice professional ==
Oikawa was born in Matsubushi, Saitama on May 6, 1987. He learned how to play shogi from his father when he was about five years old, and developed an interest in solving tsume shogi problems. He was accepted into the Japan Shogi Association's apprentice school as a student of shogi professional Hatasu Itō at the rank of 6-kyū in 1998, was promoted to the rank of 1-dan in 2003 and then obtained full professional status and the rank of 4-dan after finishing second in the 41st 3-dan League with a record of 13 wins and 5 losses.

== Shogi professional ==
=== Promotion history ===
Oikawa's promotion history is as follows.

- 1998: September: 6-kyū
- 2007, October 1: 4-dan
- 2013, January 8: 5-dan
- 2014, October 23: 6-dan
- 2021, December 20: 7-dan

== Personal life ==
Oikawa is married to female shogi professional Hatsumi Ueda. The couple were married in June 2013 and have two daughters as of October 2018.
