= Oikawa =

Oikawa (written: 及川) is a Japanese surname. Notable people with the surname include:

- Ataru Oikawa (及川 中; born 1957), Japanese film director
- Azusa Oikawa (及川 あずさ; born 1960), Japanese fencer
- Fumihiro Oikawa (及川 史弘; born 1973), Japanese figure skater and journalist
- Koshirō Oikawa (及川 古志郎; 1883–1958), Imperial Japanese Navy admiral
- Mitsuhiro Oikawa (及川 光博; born 1969), Japanese musician, singer-songwriter, composer, actor
- Mona Oikawa (born 1955), Canadian writer and professor
- Nao Oikawa (及川 奈央; born 1981), Japanese actress, television personality and AV idol
- Neko Oikawa (及川 眠子; born 1960), Japanese lyricist
- Okuro Oikawa (及川 奥郎; 1896–1970), Japanese astronomer
- Seijin Oikawa (及川 誠人; born 1970), Japanese motorcycle racer
- Shihori Oikawa (及川 栞; born 1989), Japanese field hockey player
- Takuma Oikawa (及川 拓馬; born 1987), Japanese shogi player
- Oikawa Teruhisa (及川 煌久; born 1936), Japanese sumo wrestler
- Yūya Oikawa (及川 佑; born 1981), Japanese speed skater

== Fictional characters ==
- Hazuki Oikawa (及川 葉月), a character in the manga series Moyasimon: Tales of Agriculture
- Nazuna Oikawa (及川 なずな), a character in the anime film Fireworks
- Tōru Oikawa (及川 徹), a character in the manga series Haikyu!!
- Tsurara Oikawa (及川 氷麗), a character in the manga series Nurarihyon no Mago
- Yukio Oikawa (及川 悠紀夫), a character in the anime series Digimon Adventure

== See also ==
- Zacco platypus (オイカワ、追河)
- 2667 Oikawa, outer main-belt asteroid
- Oikawa Station, a railway station in Yugawa, Kawanuma District, Fukushima Prefecture, Japan
