= Tim Berra (biologist) =

American ichthyologist, Charles Darwin biographer

Tim M. Berra
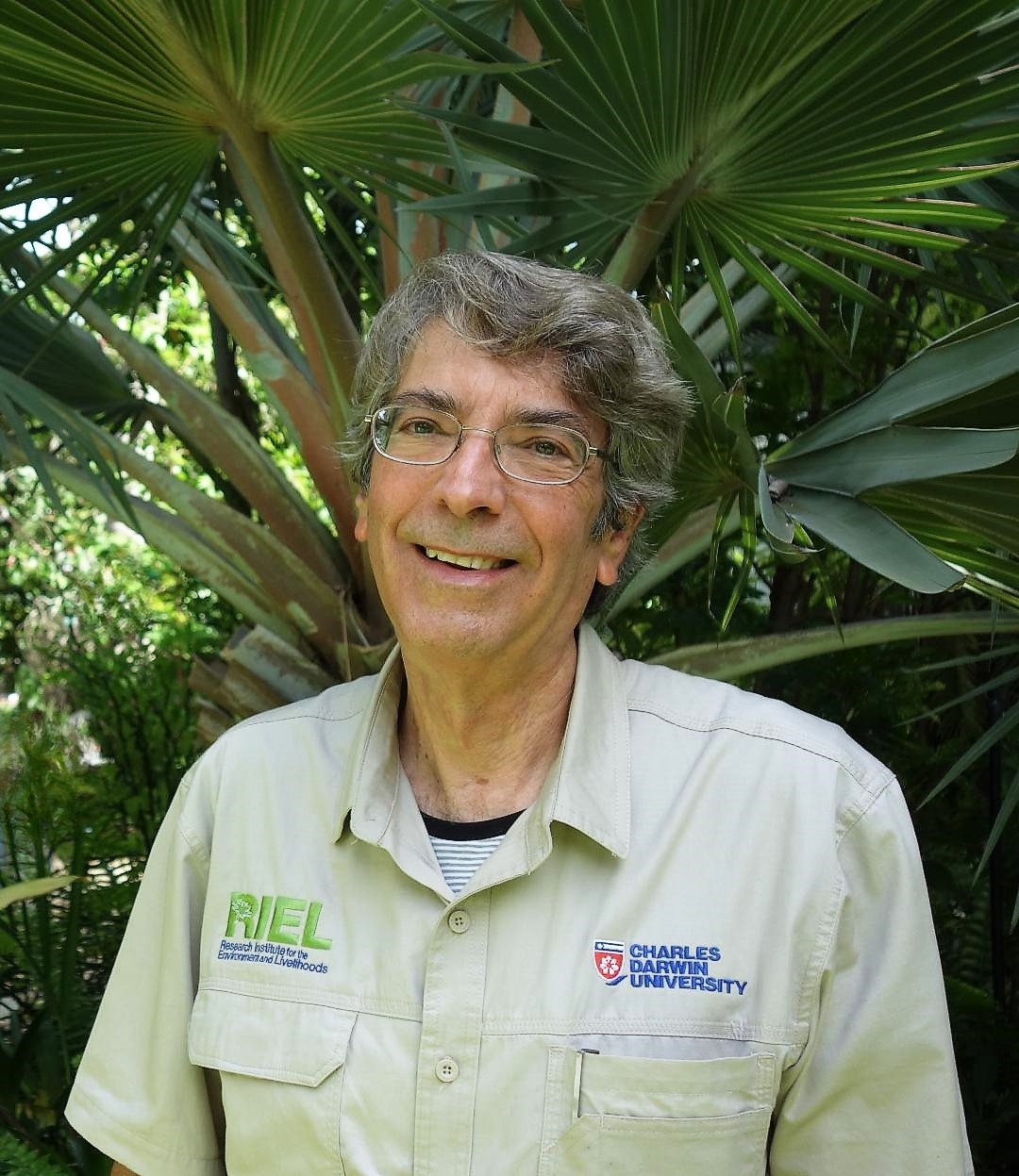
- Born: August 31, 1943 (age 82); Saint Louis, Missouri
- Education: Saint Louis University BS biology, Tulane University PhD biology
- Years active: 1969 to current
- Employer: Ohio State University
- Known for: Author, illustrator, photographer, biologist, ichthyologist, Charles Darwin biographer
- Title: Professor Emeritus of Evolution, Ecology and Organismal Biology

Tim M. Berra is academy professor and professor emeritus of evolution, ecology and organismal biology at Ohio State University. He received his MS (1967) and PhD in biology from Tulane University in 1969. He is a three-time recipient of Fulbright Fellowships to Australia in 1969, 1979, and 2009. He taught at the University of Papua New Guinea before joining the faculty of OSU in 1972. He has spent over 11 years doing fieldwork in Australia. He is known for his ichthyological research and biographies of Charles Darwin, Darwin's children and naturalist William Beebe. Berra has researched and written about the Murray cod, trout cod, Australian grayling, salamanderfish, galaxiids, megamouth shark and the nurseryfish. In 2009 the Smithsonian Institution received his collection of 260 species of rare fishes. In 2022 the National Center for Science Education (NCSE) presented Berra the "Friend of Darwin" award.

== Early life and education ==
Born August 31, 1943, in St. Louis, Missouri, Berra credits his mother helping him with his career in science, by allowing him to read at the dinner table despite his father thinking it wasn't a good idea. He dedicated his book Evolution and the Myth of Creationism to his mother saying "For my mother for allowing me to read during meals". He acquired a love of fish because he kept tropical fish in his bedroom as a child, which led him to read about how to take care of them to keep them healthy. He said his, "hobby education led to a career down the road". Berra received his BS in biology at Saint Louis University and his MS and PhD in biology at Tulane University in Louisiana. He has received three Fulbright scholarships which allowed him to study abroad in Australia. He is a professorial fellow at Charles Darwin University in Darwin, Australia.

== Career ==
Berra has been called "an international expert in freshwater fish, with a reputation for solving long-standing mysteries". His notable work includes the taxonomic separation of two species of Australian cod (the trout cod from Murray cod) in the Murray River, and solving the disappearance and reappearance of the salamanderfish in Southwestern Australia, discovering that they burrow when the pools dry only to reappear later when the water returns.

In 1988, Berra contributed to the preservation of a megamouth shark, a species witnessed rarely before that, described as "one of the most important zoological finds of the decade".

Berra's 1996 research on Galaxias maculatus proved that its freshwater distribution around the Southern Hemisphere was due to dispersal through the sea of salt-tolerant juveniles. He has also worked on other Chilean galaxiids.

Berra is a university professorial fellow at Charles Darwin University, a research associate at the Northern Territory Museum, and emeritus professor of evolution, ecology, and organismal biology at Ohio State University.

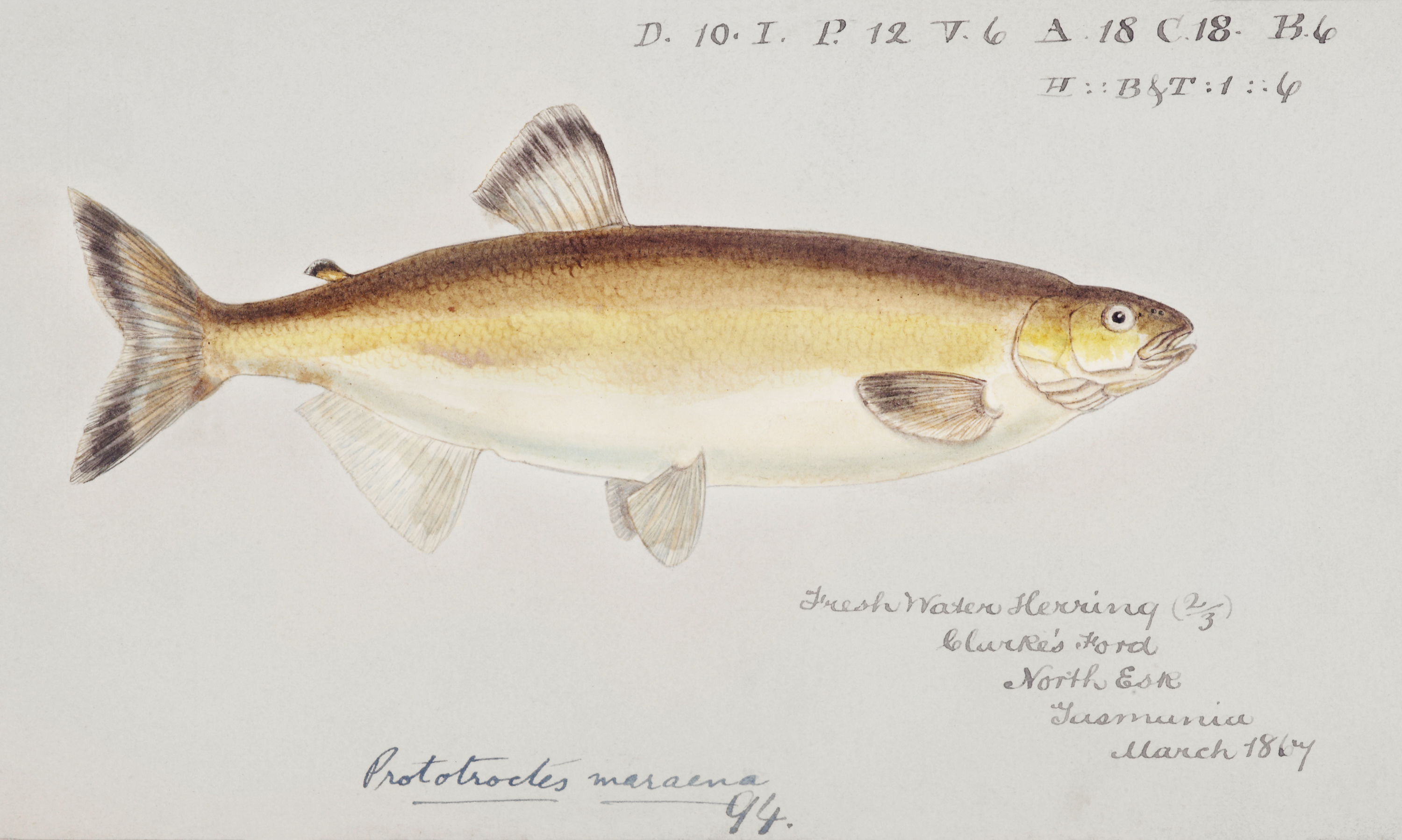
Australian grayling (Prototroctes maraena)

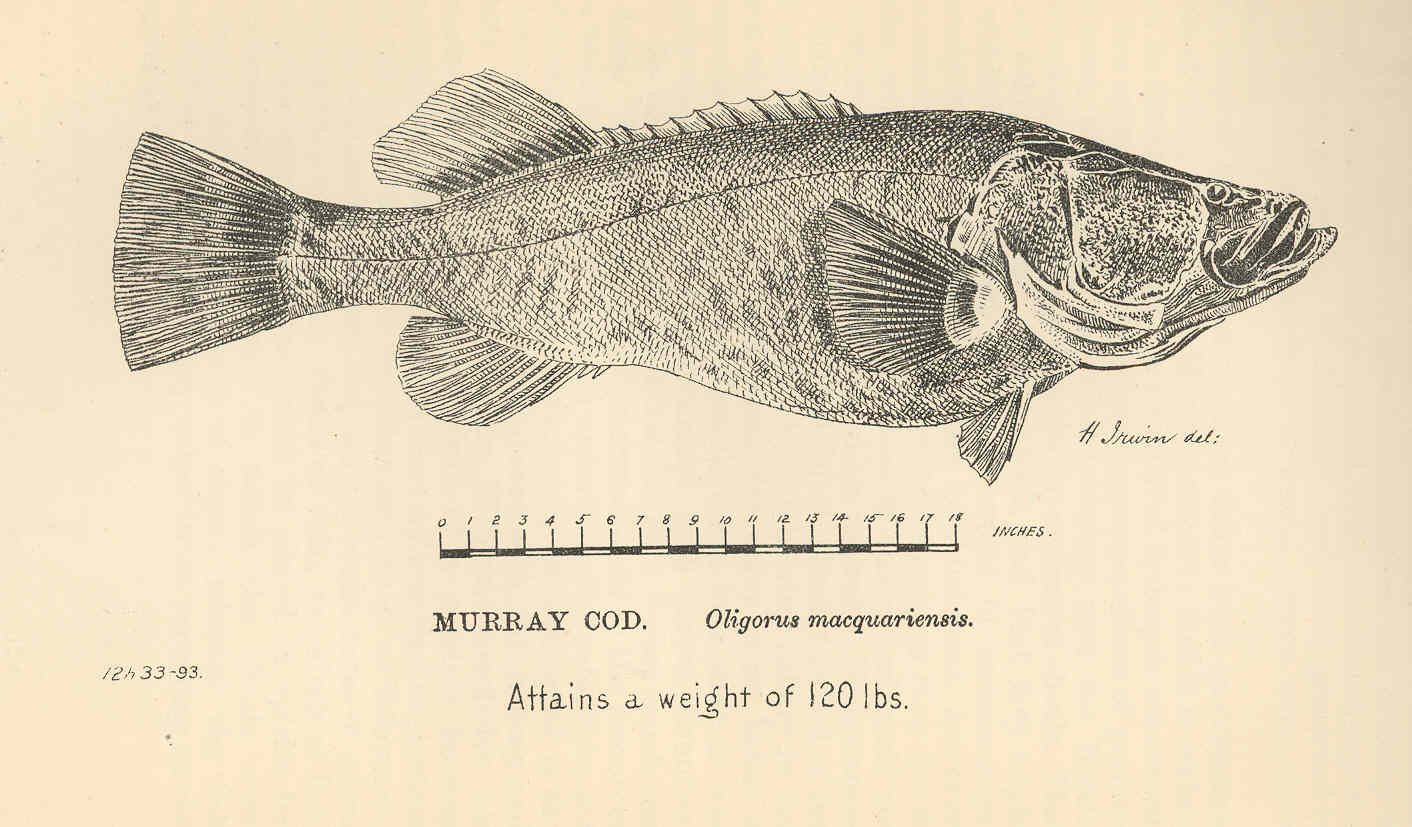
Murray cod (Maccullochella peeli)

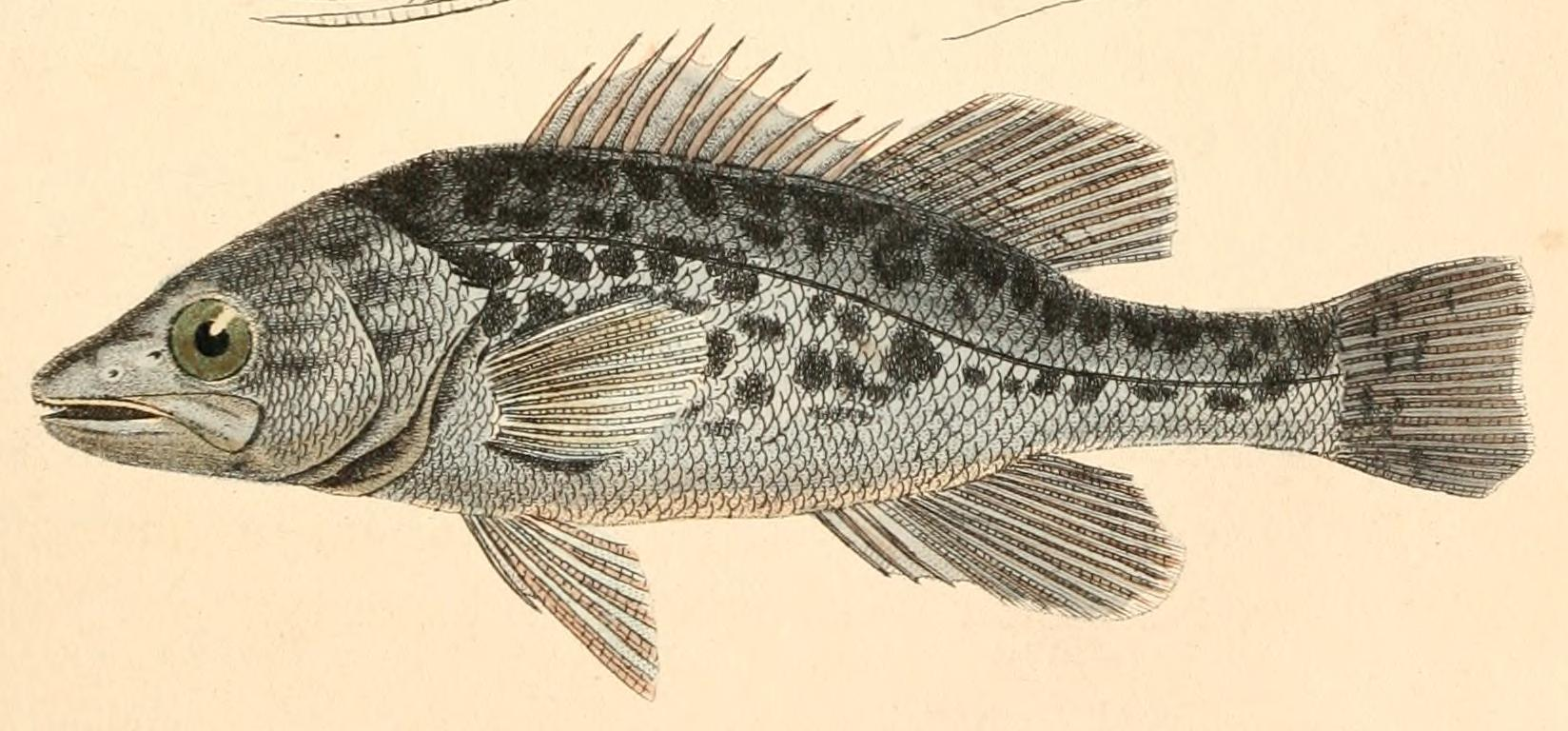
Trout cod (Maccullochella macquariensis)

- 1969 – Awarded a Fulbright Post-Doctoral Fellowship at the Australian National University in Canberra, Australia
- 1971 – Lecturer of biology, University of Papua New Guinea
- 1979 – Fulbright senior research fellow at Monash University in Melbourne, Australia
- 1992 – Visiting professor University of Concepción in Chile
- 1996 – Visiting professor University of Otago in Dunedin, New Zealand
- 1992–2000 – Member of the board of trustees of the Columbus Zoo and Aquarium
- 1989–2022 – Served on the board of governors of the American Society of Ichthyologists and Herpetologists.
- 1981–1985 – Editor-in-chief of The Ohio Journal of Science.

=== Charles Darwin ===
Fascinated as a child by the adventures of the HMS Beagle and the naturalist William Beebe, Berra has written several books on Charles Darwin, Darwin's family and in 1977, Beebe. Charles Darwin: The Concise Story of an Extraordinary Man was published in 2009, timed for the 200th anniversary of Darwin's birth in 1809. Berra became interested in the children of Darwin and his wife Emma Wedgwood. The children had often been mentioned in other books, but little had been written about their lives, Berra researched the ten children and published Darwin and His Children: His Other Legacy in 2013. Darwin and his wife were first cousins, which interested Berra on how this might have affected the family genetics. Their consanguine marriage possibly affected the children with "reduced fertility" compared with similar families of their class during that time. Seven children lived to adulthood, only three of those had children. Darwin himself suffered from ill-health, "severe digestive problems and a skin disease that made shaving so painful that he grew his distinctive beard". Berra asked researchers in Spain who had used computer modeling to understand the genetics of the Habsburg family tree to look into the genetics of the Darwin family. The result was that there was an increased risk of low-fertility and bacterial infections, which at least two of Darwin's children died of.

In 2016 The Washington Post contacted Berra to weigh in on the importance of finding a letter from Darwin that had been stolen 30-years prior by an intern at the Smithsonian. Berra explained that while Darwin was trained as a geologist and would have been "interested in what was going on in America", this letter would be one of over 7,000 letters written by Darwin and anything by Darwin "is of historical significance and scientific significance". Berra has pushed for the city of Darwin to fully embrace the man and legacy that they are named for. In 2014 Berra said that when he started coming to Darwin in 2001 he was "struck by the fact that there was nothing visible about him [Darwin] to the public." Today, the Beagle ship bell chimes and bust of Darwin reside in Darwin's Civic Center, and the former Northern Territory University is renamed Charles Darwin University. Berra gave the keynote address on Darwin in 2009 at the 200th anniversary of the birth of Darwin held at the Darwin Convention Center in Darwin.

=== After retirement ===
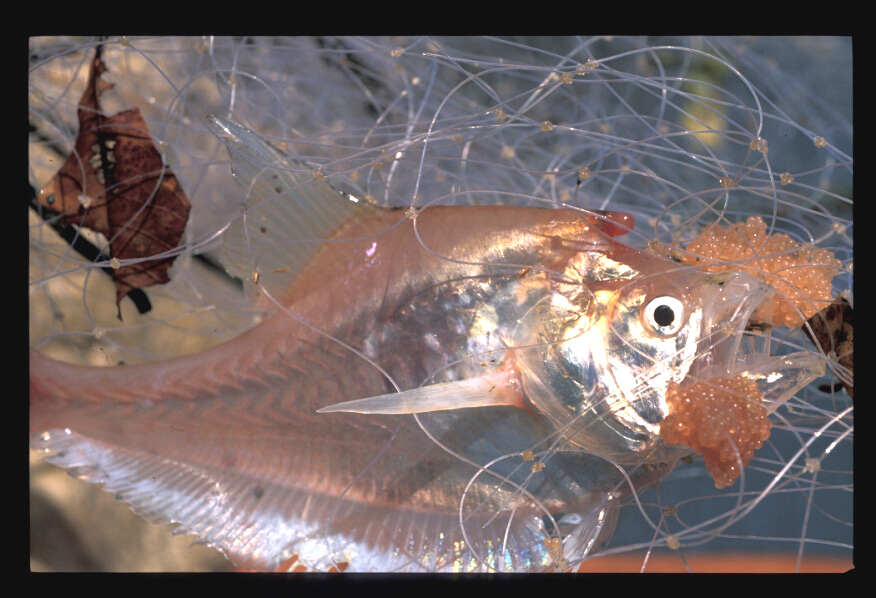
Male nurseryfish with embryos - photographed inside net

In 1995, Berra retired from teaching full time. In 2009 he won his third Fulbright Fellowship, and continued to publish books and scientific papers. In 2016 as a professorial fellow stationed at Charles Darwin University in Darwin, Australia, Berra continued his work on nurseryfish. His research on the nurseryfish was to investigate the male's unique adaptation, carrying thousands of fertilized eggs on a hook "like a bunch of grapes". Berra wanted to know how the embryos attached to the hook, and if the male was the genetic father of the embryos.

During one of the research trips in 2011 with Wedd on the Adelaide River they encountered a 5-metre crocodile locals call Agro eating the fish that Berra and Wedd had trapped in a net they were using in their research. Argo got his teeth into the net and before Berra and Wedd could attempt releasing it, Argo tore a "humungous hole" in the net. The rest of the day Argo followed them around the river. In 2009 the Smithsonian Institution received Berra's collection of 260 species of rare fishes. Berra and his wife Rita M. Berra endowed the first chair established at Ohio State's regional campus. Berra hopes that the chair will be filled by a scientist that will do field work and return to teach at the Mansfield campus, also Berra made the bequest to honor his wife Rita, of whom he said "She has made my life easier for all these years and has provided unselfish support, freeing me to pursue my research". The chair is called the Tim M. and Rita M. Berra Endowed Chair in Evolutionary Biology, in the Department of Evolution, Ecology and Organismal Biology.

== Personal life ==
Berra decided to apply his professional curiosity towards one of his other passions, bourbon. He attended Bourbon Academy and Moonshine University, read many books and in 2019 authored his own, Bourbon: What the Educated Drinker Should Know. Berra states that his "scientific training and methods helped him find and organize information". Until 2022, Berra was spending winters as a resident of Anna Maria Island in Florida. Married to Rita M. Berra.

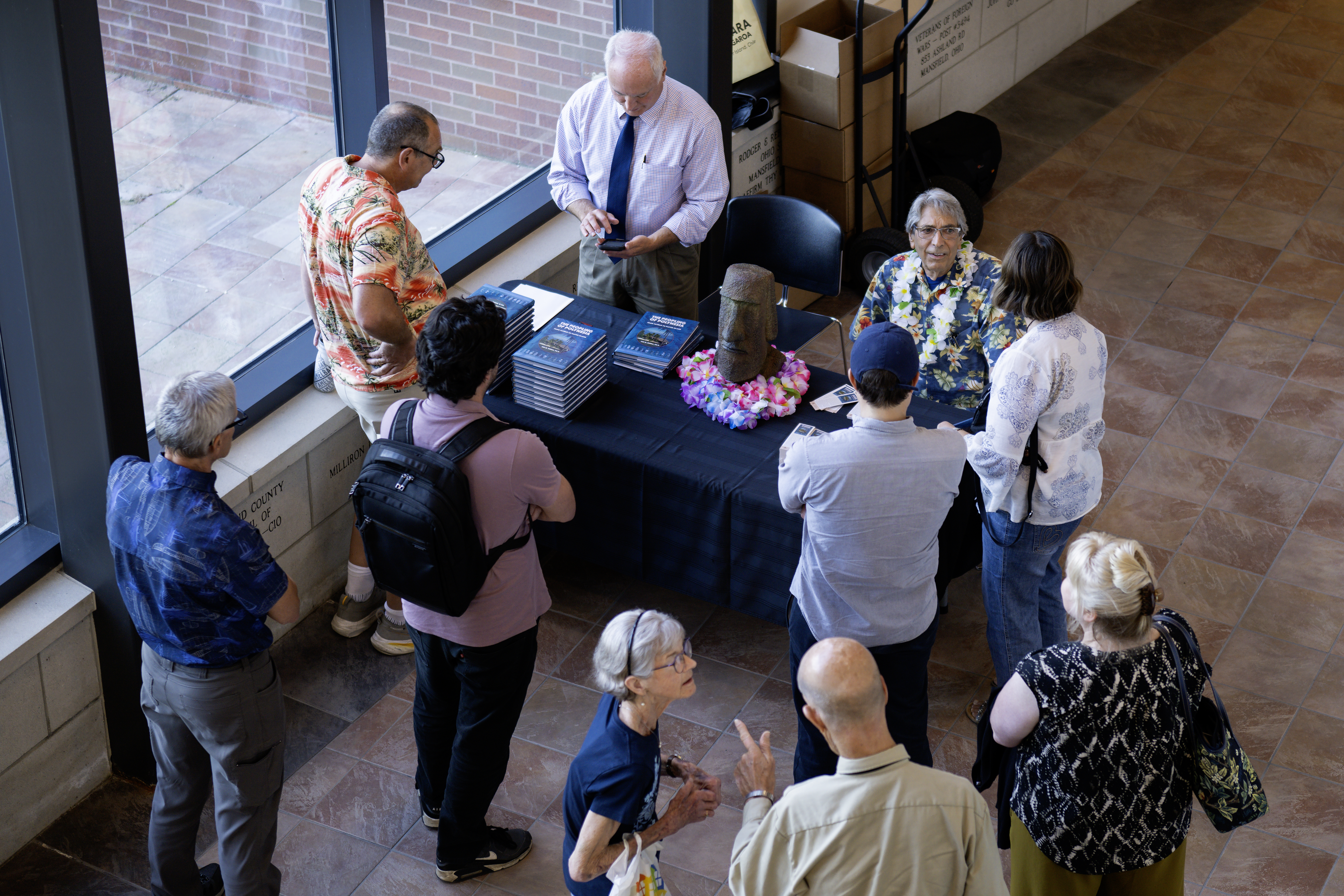
Tim Berra signs copies of The Peopling of Polynesia: From Taiwan to Easter Island on 2 Sept. 2025 at The Ohio State University Mansfield Campus.

== Awards ==
- National Center for Science Education (NCSE) presented Berra the 2022 "Friend of Darwin" award. Executive director Ann Reid stated, "Tim Berra has helped to expose the flaws of creationism going back to the days of creation science".

== Selected publications ==
=== Books ===
- Berra, Tim (September 22, 2025). The Peopling of Polynesia: From Taiwan to Easter Island (First ed.). Acclaim Press, Inc. ISBN 978-1965370148.
- Berra, Tim (2019). BOURBON: What the Educated Drinker Should Know. Morley: Acclaim Press. ISBN 978-1-948901-13-0.
- Berra, Tim (2013). Darwin and His Children: His Other Legacy. United States: Oxford University Press. ISBN 978-0199309443.
- Berra, Tim (2009). Charles Darwin: The Concise Story of an Extraordinary Man. United States: Johns Hopkins University Press. ISBN 9780801891045.
- Berra, Tim (2007). Freshwater Fish Distribution - 2nd Edition. United States: University of Chicago Press. ISBN 978-0226044422.
- Berra, Tim (2001). Freshwater Fish Distribution. Academic Press. ISBN 978-0120931569.
- Berra, Tim (1998). A Natural History of Australia. Academic Press. ISBN 978-0120931552.
- Berra, Tim (1990). Evolution and the Myth of Creationism: A Basic Guide to the Facts in the Evolution Debate. United States: Stanford University Press. ISBN 978-0804717700.
- Berra, Tim & R. M. McDowall (forward) (1981). Atlas of Distribution of Freshwater Fish Families of the World. United States: University of Nebraska Press. ISBN 978-0803214118.
- Berra, Tim (1977). William Beebe: An Annotated Bibliography. Shoe String Pr Inc. ISBN 0208016082.
