= Diamond and Flower Ferris Wheel =

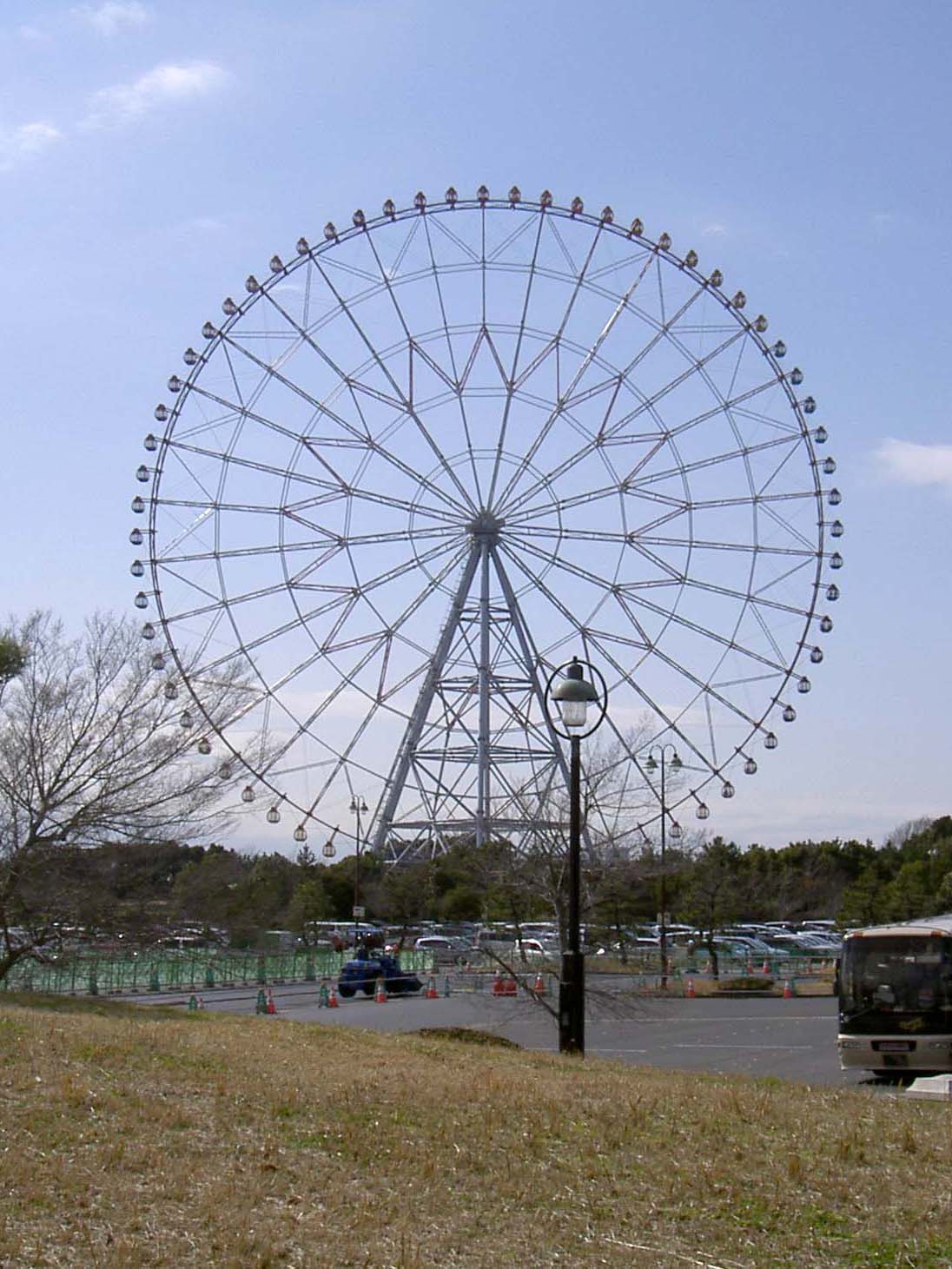
- Interactive map of the Diamond and Flower Ferris Wheel area

General information
- Type: Ferris wheel
- Location: Tokyo, Japan
- Coordinates: 35.64394°N 139.85725°E

Height
- Height: 117 metres (384 ft)

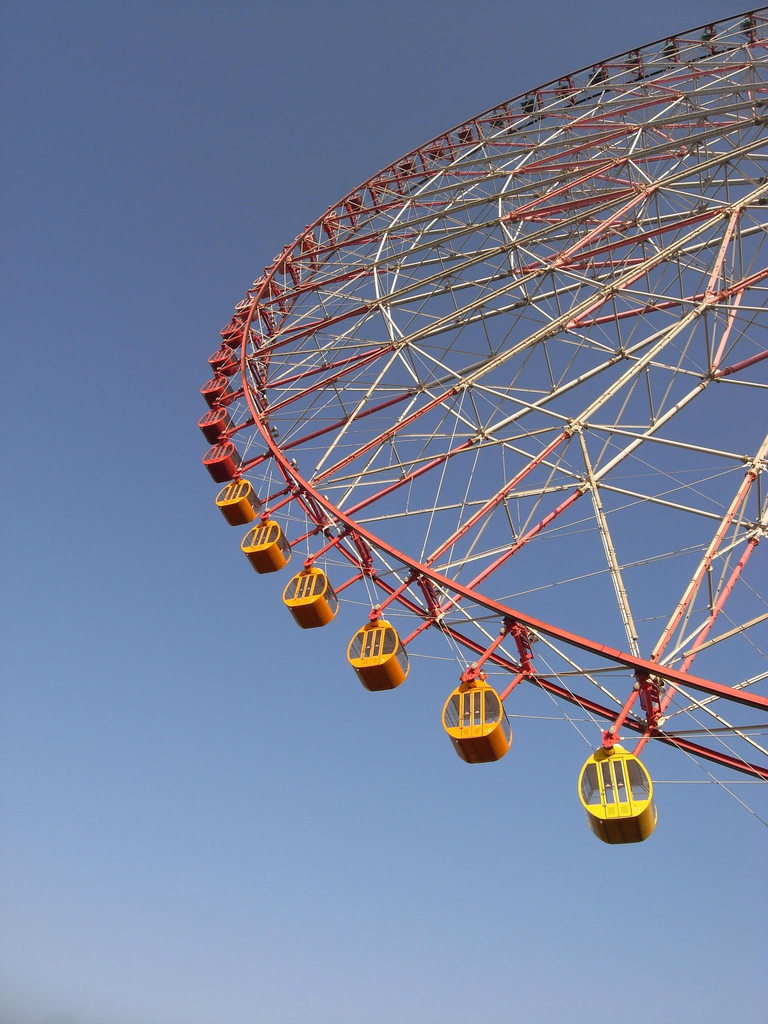

Diamond and Flower Ferris Wheel (ダイヤと花の大観覧車, Daiya to hana no daikanransha) is a 117-metre (384 ft) tall Ferris wheel in Kasai Rinkai Park, in Edogawa, Tokyo, Japan. It is named for its light shows, which have the appearance of a sparkling diamond or flower.

When completed in 2001, it was the world's second tallest Ferris wheel. It was also the tallest Ferris wheel ever built in Japan, but was surpassed the following year by the 120-metre (390 ft) Sky Dream Fukuoka. However, the Fukuoka wheel closed in September 2009, and the Kasai Rinkai Park wheel once again became Japan's tallest operational Ferris wheel.

The wheel is 111 metres (364 ft) in diameter and has 68 passenger cars, each able to carry 6 people. Passengers may not smoke and pets are not permitted. Each rotation takes 17 minutes, and on a clear day the views from the top of the wheel include Tokyo, Tokyo Bay, Tokyo Disneyland, Chiba, Mount Fuji, and the Bōsō Peninsula.
