= Funabashi-Nichidaimae Station =

Railway station in Funabashi, Chiba Prefecture, Japan

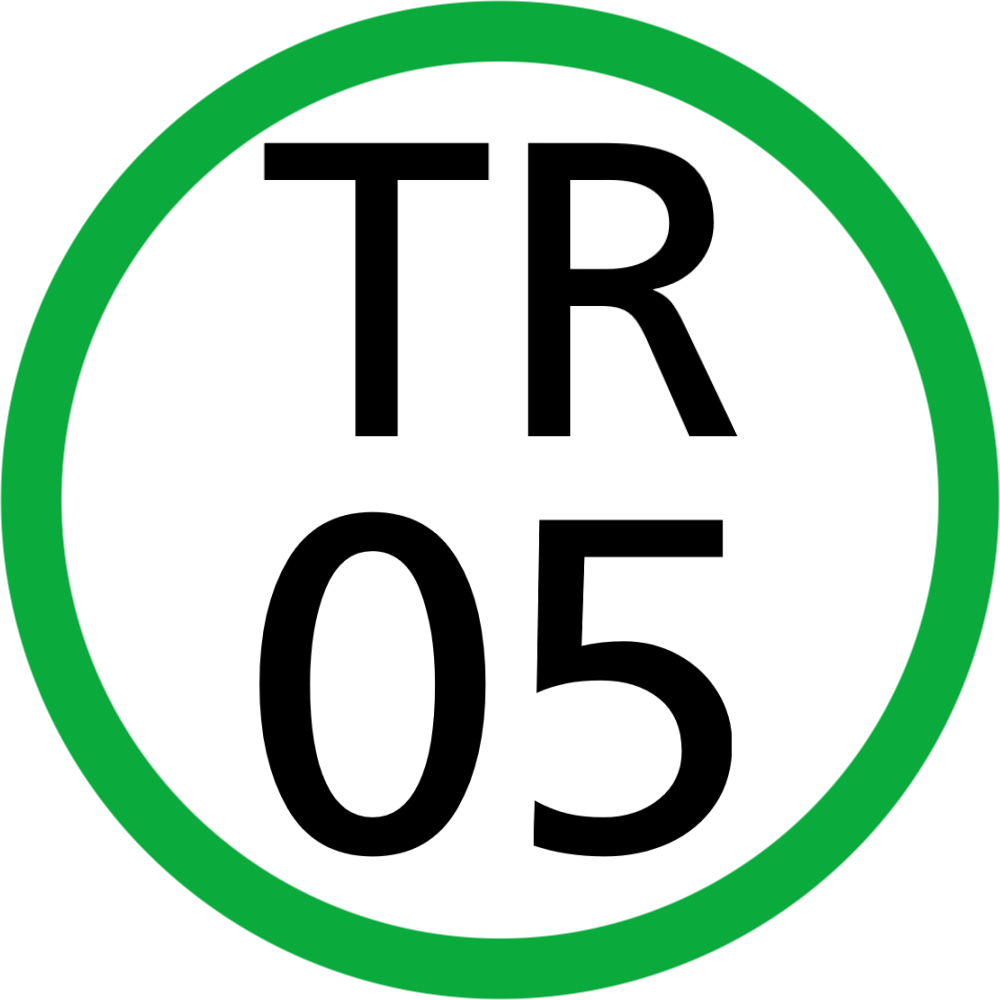
Funabashi-Nichidaimae Station 船橋日大前駅

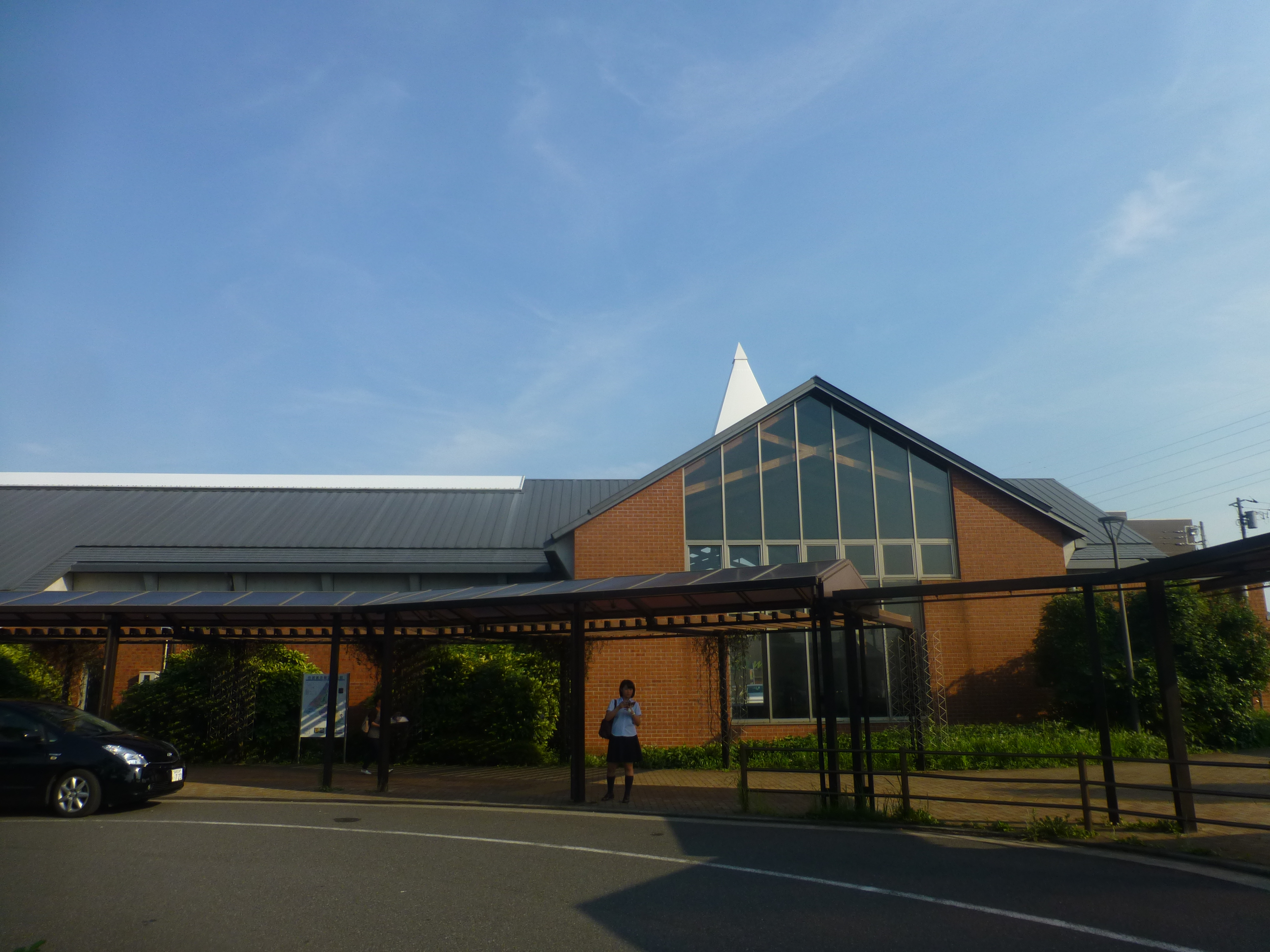
- East Exit of Funabashi-Nichidaimae Station, 2016

General information
- Location: Tsuboi-Higashi 1-chome, Funabashi-shi, Chiba^ken 274-0060; Japan
- Coordinates: 35.7271°N 140.0590°E
- Operator: Tōyō Rapid Railway
- Line: Tōyō Rapid Railway Line
- Distance: 9.8 km from Nishi-Funabashi
- Platforms: 2 side platforms
- Tracks: 2

Construction
- Structure type: Underground

Other information
- Station code: TR05
- Website: Official website

History
- Opened: 27 April 1996; 30 years ago

Passengers
- FY2018: 10,157 daily

Services
Preceding station	Tōyō Rapid Railway	Following station
Kita-Narashino TR04 towards Nishi-Funabashi	Tōyō Rapid Railway Line	Yachiyo-Midorigaoka TR06 towards Tōyō-Katsutadai
Location
- Location within Tokyo Keiyo area Location within Chiba Prefecture Location within Japan

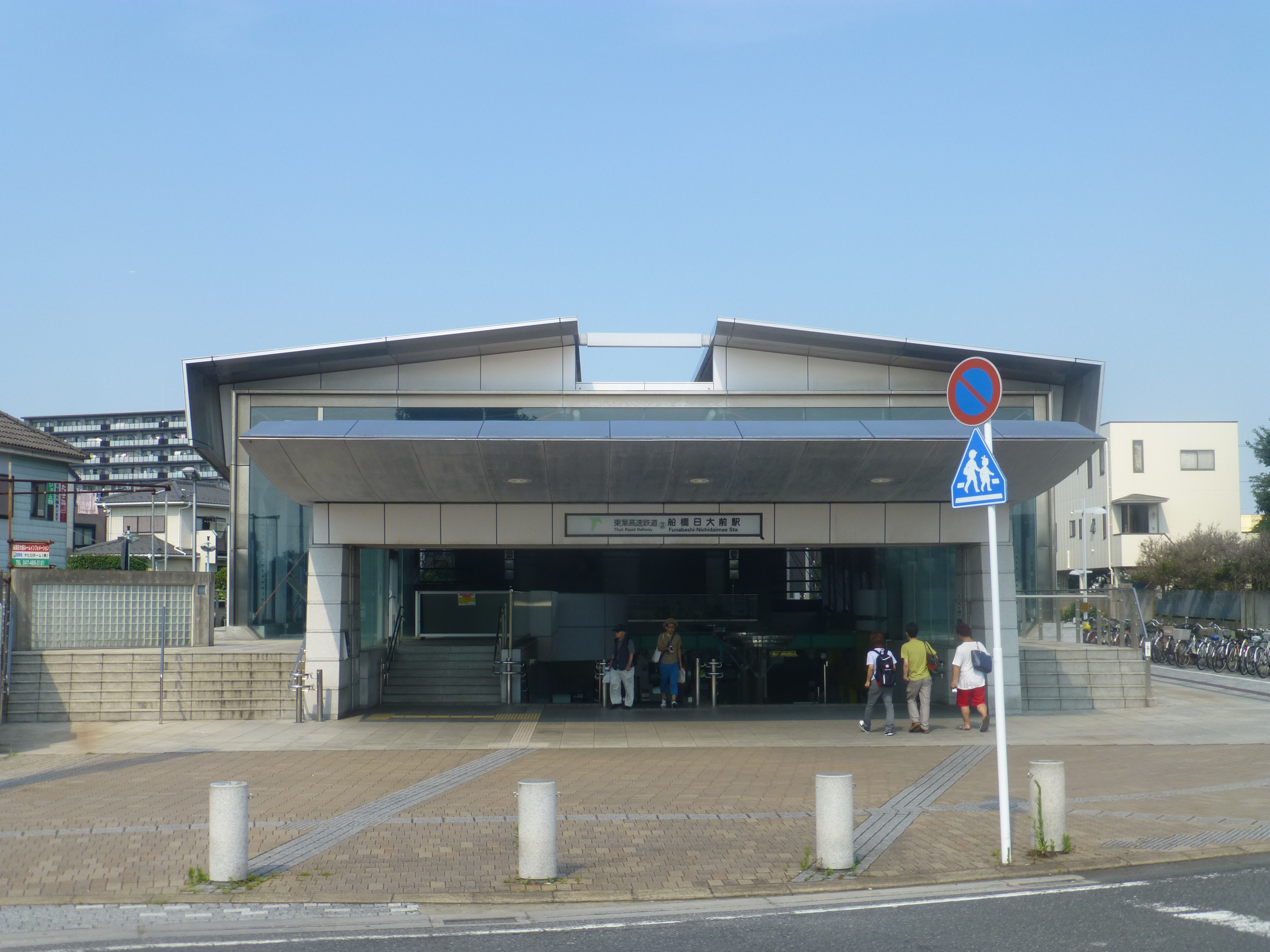
West exit, 2016.

Funabashi-Nichidaimae Station (船橋日大前駅, Funabashi-Nichidaimae-eki) is a passenger railway station in the city of Funabashi, Chiba, Japan, operated by the third sector railway operator Tōyō Rapid Railway.

== Lines ==
Funabashi-Nichidaimae Station is a station on the Tōyō Rapid Railway Line, and is 9.8 km from the starting point of the line at Nishi-Funabashi Station.

== Station layout ==
The station is an underground station with two opposed side platforms with the station building located at ground level.

=== Platforms ===
1	Tōyō Rapid Railway Line	for Yachiyo-Midorigaoka and Tōyō-Katsutadai
2	Tōyō Rapid Railway Line	for Kita-Narashino, Nishi-Funabashi, Tōyōchō, Ōtemachi, and Nakano

== History ==
Funabashi-Nichidaimae Station was opened on April 27, 1996. The East Exit to the station was completed in 2004.

== Passenger statistics ==
In fiscal 2018, the station was used by an average of 10,157 passengers daily.

== Surrounding area ==
- Funabashi Arena
- Nihon University Funabashi Campus (Faculty of Science and Engineering, Graduate School of Science and Engineering)
- Nihon University Faculty of Pharmaceutical Sciences Campus (Faculty of Pharmaceutical Sciences, Graduate School of Pharmaceutical Sciences)
- Nihon University College of Science Funabashi Campus
- Nihon University Narashino High School

== See also ==
- List of railway stations in Japan
