= Yachiyo =

Yachiyo may refer to:

== Places ==
- Yachiyo, Chiba, a city in Chiba Prefecture, Japan
- Yachiyo-Chūō Station, a passenger railway station
- Yachiyo, Hyōgo, a former town in Hyōgo Prefecture, Japan
- Yachiyo, Ibaraki, a town in Ibaraki Prefecture, Japan
- Yachiyo-Midorigaoka Station, a passenger railway station
- Yachiyo Shoin Junior and Senior High School, are private schools located in Yachiyo Chiba prefecture, Japan

== People ==
- Yachiyo Kasugano (春日野 八千代; 1925-2012), Japanese former member of the musical theater troupe Takarazuka Revue
- Yachiyo Okada (岡田 八千代; 1883-1962), Japanese novelist, playwright, and theater critic
- Yachiyo Yokoyama (横山 八千代; born 1915), also known as Yumeko Aizome, Japanese former film and stage actress

== Characters ==
- Yachiyo Inugami, a character in the manga and anime series Inugami-san to Nekoyama-san
- Yachiyo Nanami, a character in the manga and anime series Magia Record
- Yachiyo Todoroki, a character in the manga and anime series Working!!
- Yachiyo Runami, a character in anime film Cosmic Princess Kaguya!
- A fictional teenage Japanese-Hawaiian girl, the title character in Philip Kan Gotanda's play The Ballad of Yachiyo
