= Murakami Station (Chiba) =

Railway station in Yachiyo, Chiba Prefecture, Japan

TR08 Murakami Station 村上駅
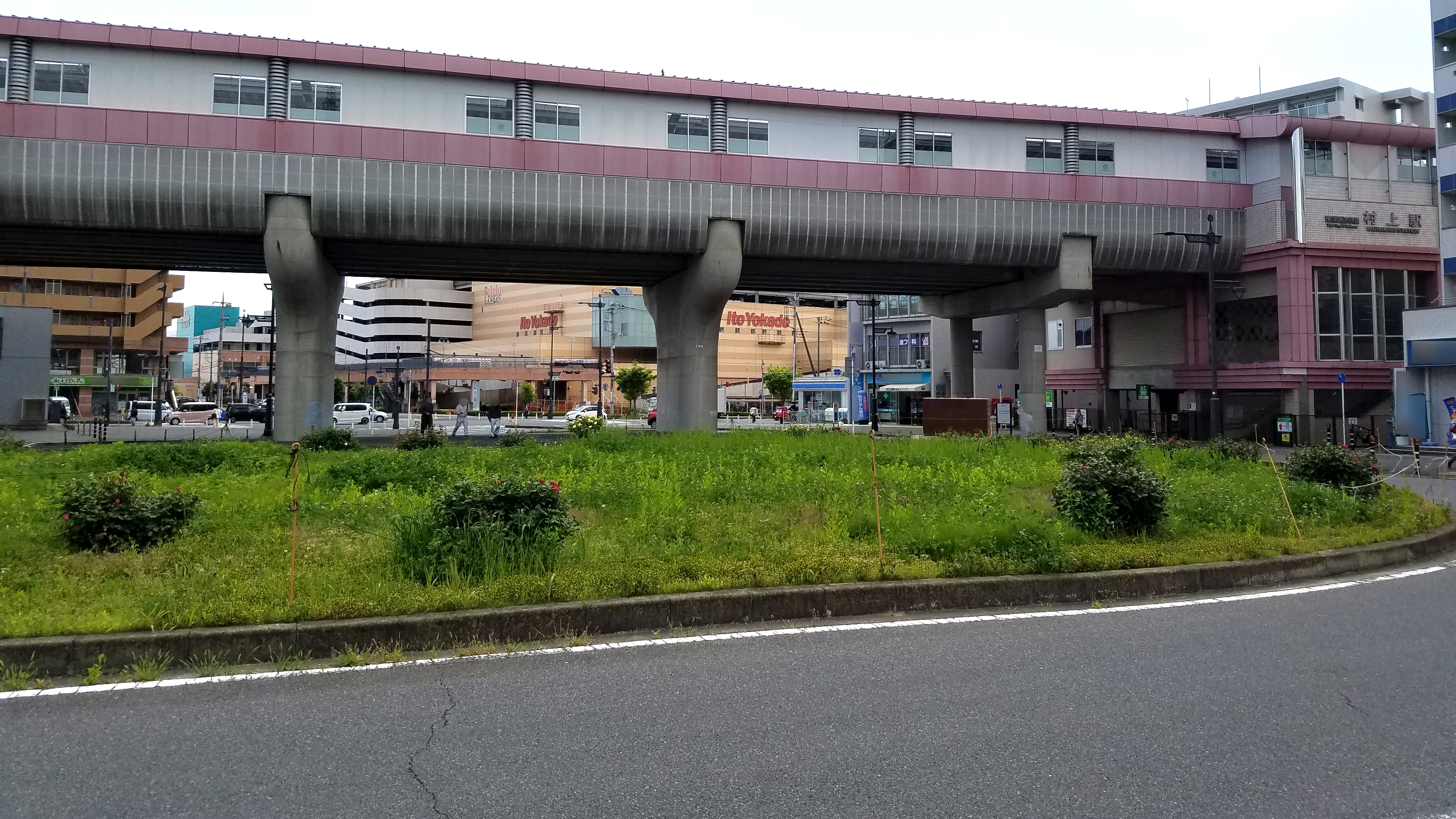
- Murakami Station in April 2021

General information
- Location: 1-8-1 Murakami-Minami, Yachiyo-shi, Chiba-ken 276-0029; Japan
- Coordinates: 35°43′25″N 140°7′7″E
- Operator: Tōyō Rapid Railway
- Line: Tōyō Rapid Railway Line
- Distance: 15.2 km (9.4 mi) from Nishi-Funabashi
- Platforms: 2 side platforms
- Tracks: 2

Construction
- Structure type: Elevated

Other information
- Station code: TR08
- Website: Official website

History
- Opened: 27 April 1996; 30 years ago

Passengers
- FY2018: 5,952 daily

Services
Preceding station	Tōyō Rapid Railway	Following station
Yachiyo-Chūō TR07 towards Nishi-Funabashi	Tōyō Rapid Railway Line	Tōyō-Katsutadai TR09 Terminus
Location
- Location within Tokyo Keiyo area Location within Chiba Prefecture Location within Japan

Murakami Station (村上駅, Murakami-eki) is a passenger railway station in the city of Yachiyo, Chiba, Japan, operated by the third sector railway operator Tōyō Rapid Railway.

== Lines ==
Murakami Station is a station on the Tōyō Rapid Railway Line, and is 15.2 km from the starting point of the line at Nishi-Funabashi Station.

== Station layout ==
The station consists of two elevated opposed side platforms with the station building underneath.

=== Platforms ===
1	Tōyō Rapid Railway Line	for Tōyō-Katsutadai
2	Tōyō Rapid Railway Line	for Yachiyo-Midorigaoka, Kita-Narashino, Nishi-Funabashi, Ōtemachi, and Nakano

== History ==
Murakami Station was opened on April 27, 1996.

== Passenger statistics ==
In fiscal 2018, the station was used by an average of 5,952 passengers daily.

== Surrounding area ==
- Yachiyo Municipal Folk Museum
- Yachiyo Picture-letter Museum
- Chiba Prefectural Yachiyo Higashi High School
- Yachiyo Municipal Murakami Junior High School
- Yachiyo Municipal Murakami Higashi Junior High School
- Yachiyo Municipal Murakami Elementary School

== See also ==
- List of railway stations in Japan
