= Yachiyo-Chūō Station =

Railway station in Yachiyo, Chiba Prefecture, Japan

TR07 Yachiyo-Chūō Station 八千代中央駅
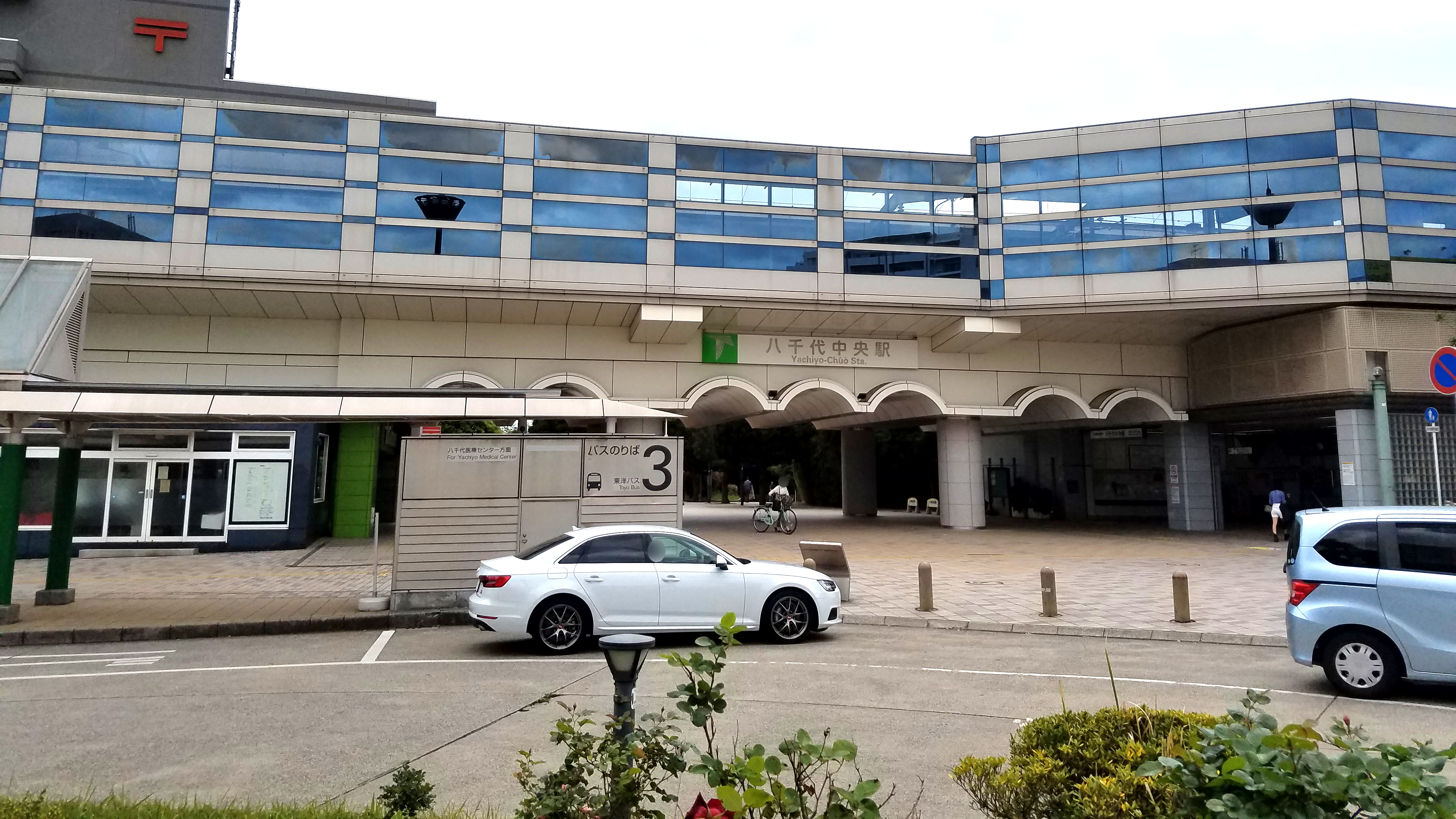
- The north-side view of the station in April 2021

General information
- Location: 1-38 Yurinokidai, Yachiyo-shi, Chiba-ken 276-0042; Japan
- Coordinates: 35.7281°N 140.1038°E
- Operator: Tōyō Rapid Railway
- Line: Tōyō Rapid Railway Line
- Distance: 13.8 km (8.6 mi) from Nishi-Funabashi
- Platforms: 2 side platforms
- Tracks: 2

Construction
- Structure type: Elevated

Other information
- Station code: TR07
- Website: Official website

History
- Opened: 27 April 1996; 30 years ago

Passengers
- FY2018: 23,944 daily

Services
Preceding station	Tōyō Rapid Railway	Following station
Yachiyo-Midorigaoka TR06 towards Nishi-Funabashi	Tōyō Rapid Railway Line	Murakami TR08 towards Tōyō-Katsutadai
Location
- Location within Chiba Prefecture Location within Japan

Yachiyo-Chūō Station (八千代中央駅, Yachiyo-Chūō-eki) is a passenger railway station in the city of Yachiyo, Chiba, Japan, operated by the third sector railway operator Tōyō Rapid Railway.

== Lines ==
Yachiyo-Chūō Station is a station on the Tōyō Rapid Railway Line, and is 13.8 kilometres (8.6 mi) from the terminus of the line at Nishi-Funabashi Station.

== Station layout ==
The station has dual opposed elevated side platforms, with a station building underneath.

=== Platforms ===
1	Tōyō Rapid Railway Line	for Tōyō-Katsutadai
2	Tōyō Rapid Railway Line	for Yachiyo-Midorigaoka, Kita-Narashino, Nishi-Funabashi, Ōtemachi, and Nakano

== History ==
Yachiyo-Chūō Station was opened on April 27, 1996.

== Passenger statistics ==
In fiscal 2018, the station was used by an average of 23,944 passengers daily.

== Surrounding area ==
- Yachiyo City Hall

== See also ==
- List of railway stations in Japan
