= Tōyō Rapid Railway Line =

Railway line in Chiba prefecture, Japan

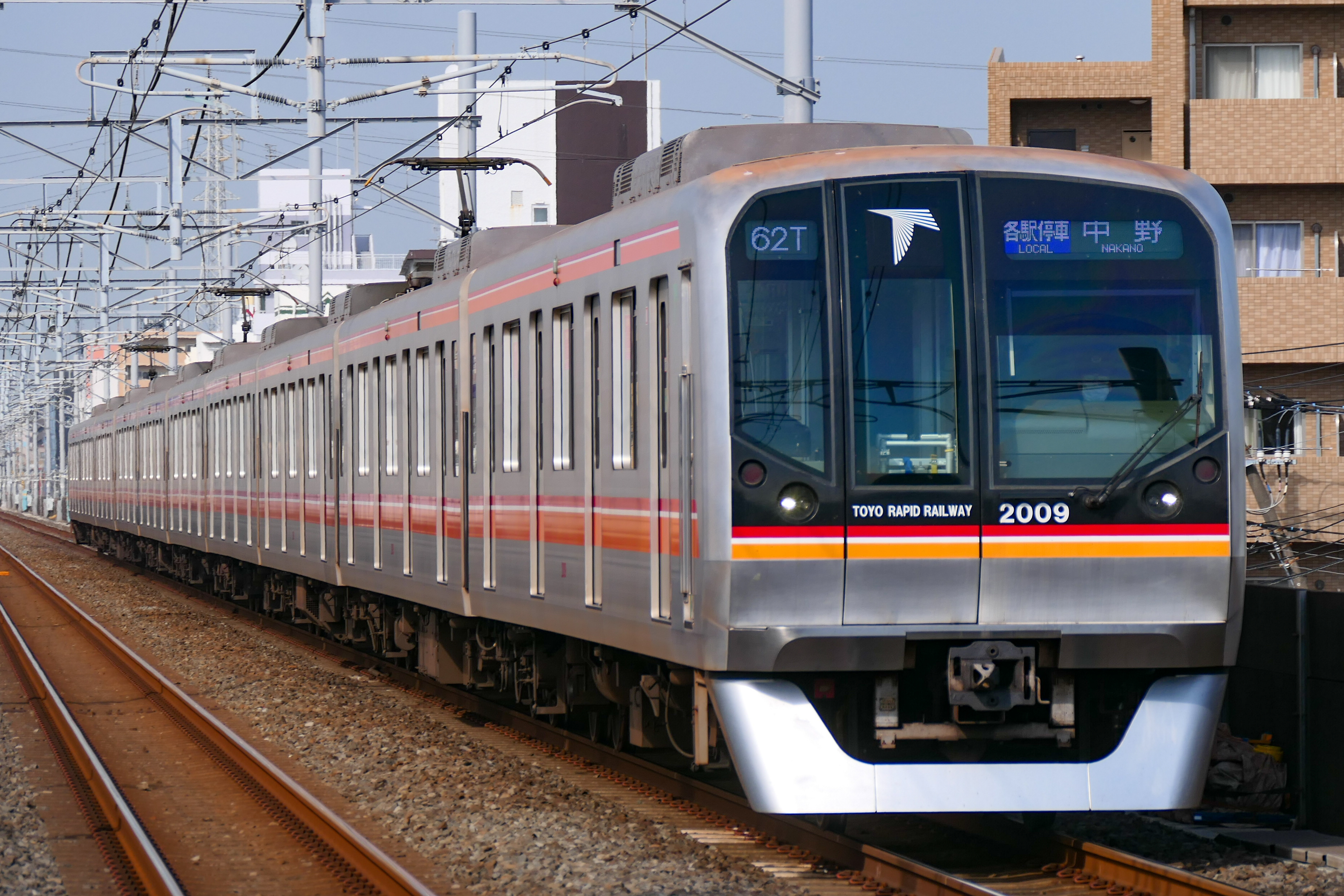
- A Tōyō Rapid 2000 series train on the line.

Overview
- Native name: 東葉高速線
- Owner: Toyo Rapid Railway
- Locale: Chiba Prefecture
- Termini: Nishi-Funabashi; Toyo-Katsutadai
- Stations: 9

Service
- Type: Rapid transit
- Depot: Yachiyo-Midorigaoka

History
- Opened: 27 April 1996; 30 years ago

Technical
- Line length: 16.2 km (10.1 mi)
- Num of tracks: 2
- Track gauge: 1,067 mm (3 ft 6 in)
- Electrification: 1,500 V DC, overhead catenary
- Operating speed: 100 km/h (60 mph)

The Tōyō Rapid Railway Line (東葉高速線, Tōyō Kōsoku-sen) is a rapid transit line owned by third-sector railway company Tōyō Rapid Railway Co., Ltd. The line connects Nishi-Funabashi Station in Funabashi, Chiba and Tōyō-Katsutadai Station in Yachiyo, Chiba. The name Tōyō (東葉) comes from the characters for Tokyo and Chiba. The line functions as an eastern extension of the Tokyo Metro Tōzai Line, with a through service between the two lines.

Of the 16.2km line, approximately 5.9 km (37%) is in underground tunnel, 9.5 km (59%) is on bridges (viaducts), and 0.8 km (4%) is on embankments.

== Operation ==
Every train on the Toyo Rapid Railway (other than depot workings between Yachiyo-Midorigaoka and Toyo-Katsutadai) operates a through service with the Tokyo Metro Tōzai Line. However, as Tōyō Rapid Railway rolling stock (the Tōyō Rapid 2000 series) is not equipped with ATS-P, they must terminate at Nakano and cannot continue onto the Chūō–Sōbu Line, which uses ATS-P. Similarly, the Chūō–Sōbu Line's E231-800 series sets must terminate at Nishi-Funabashi as they lack the WS-ATC safety system the Tōyō Rapid Railway Line uses. Tokyo Metro vehicles can operate on all three lines.

=== Current train services ===
There are three train service types on the Tōyō Rapid Railway, however all trains stop at every station the Tōyō Rapid Railway Line. As such, the service type only refers to the stops made on the Tokyo Metro Tōzai Line.

==== Rapid (快速) ====
Operates between Tōyō-Katsutadai and Nakano (the western terminus of the Tōzai Line), with some services extending to Mitaka. The majority of services on the Toyo Rapid Railway use this service. While it stops at every station on the Tōyō Rapid Railway Line, the section between Nishi-Funabashi and Tōyōchō on the Tokyo Metro Tōzai Line is non-stop except for a stop at Urayasu, then the service stops at all stations west of Tōyōchō. Most morning and afternoon trains go direct to Mitaka on the Chūō–Sōbu Line.

==== Commuter Rapid (通勤快速) ====
Like the Rapid Service, it also operates between Tōyō-Katsutadai and Nakano stations and in the morning and afternoon to Mitaka, and stops at every station on the Tōyō Rapid Railway Line. Only operates in the "up" direction on mornings towards Nakano. It is non-stop between Nishi-Funabashi and Urayasu before stopping at every station west of Urayasu.

==== Local (各駅停車) ====
This service only operates on rush hours when services on the Tokyo Metro Tōzai Line make through services with the Tōyō Rapid Railway Line, and sometimes goes to Mitaka station on the Chūō–Sōbu Line. This service stops at all stations on the Tōyō Rapid Railway Line, Tokyo Metro Tōzai Line and the Chūō–Sōbu Line.

=== Former services ===
==== Tōyō Rapid (東葉快速) ====
From the revised timetable on the 4 December 1999, the "Toyo Rapid" service was created. It stopped at Nishi-Funabashi, Kita-Narashino, Yachiyo-Midorigaoka and Tōyō-Katsutadai. Due to congestion on tracks, on March 14, 2009, the timetable changed to have 4 evening "up" bound Tōyō Rapid trains, thus the "down" service towards Tōyō-Katsutadai was abolished. Due to passenger counts increasing on stops that the Tōyō Rapid did not stop at, the Tōyō Rapid service was completely abolished on the March 14, 2014 timetable change.

== Stations ==
- All services stop at every station.
- All stations are located in Chiba Prefecture.

No.	Name	Transfers	Location
↑ Through-service to/from Mitaka via the Tōzai Line and Chūō Line (Local) ↑
TR01	Nishi-Funabashi 西船橋	Tōzai Line (T-23); Chūō–Sōbu Line (JB30); Musashino Line (JM10)	Funabashi
TR02	Higashi-Kaijin 東海神		Funabashi
	Ebigawa-shin 海老川新 (2029)		Funabashi
TR03	Hasama 飯山満		Funabashi
TR04	Kita-Narashino 北習志野	Matsudo Line (KS70)	Funabashi
TR05	Funabashi-Nichidaimae 船橋日大前		Funabashi
TR06	Yachiyo-Midorigaoka 八千代緑が丘		Yachiyo
TR07	Yachiyo-Chūō 八千代中央		Yachiyo
TR08	Murakami 村上		Yachiyo
TR09	Tōyō-Katsutadai 東葉勝田台	Main Line (Katsutadai: KS31)	Yachiyo

== Rolling stock ==
- Tōyō Rapid 2000 series (only go as far as Nakano, due to lack of ATS-P)
- Tokyo Metro 05/05N series
- Tokyo Metro 07 series
- Tokyo Metro 15000 series
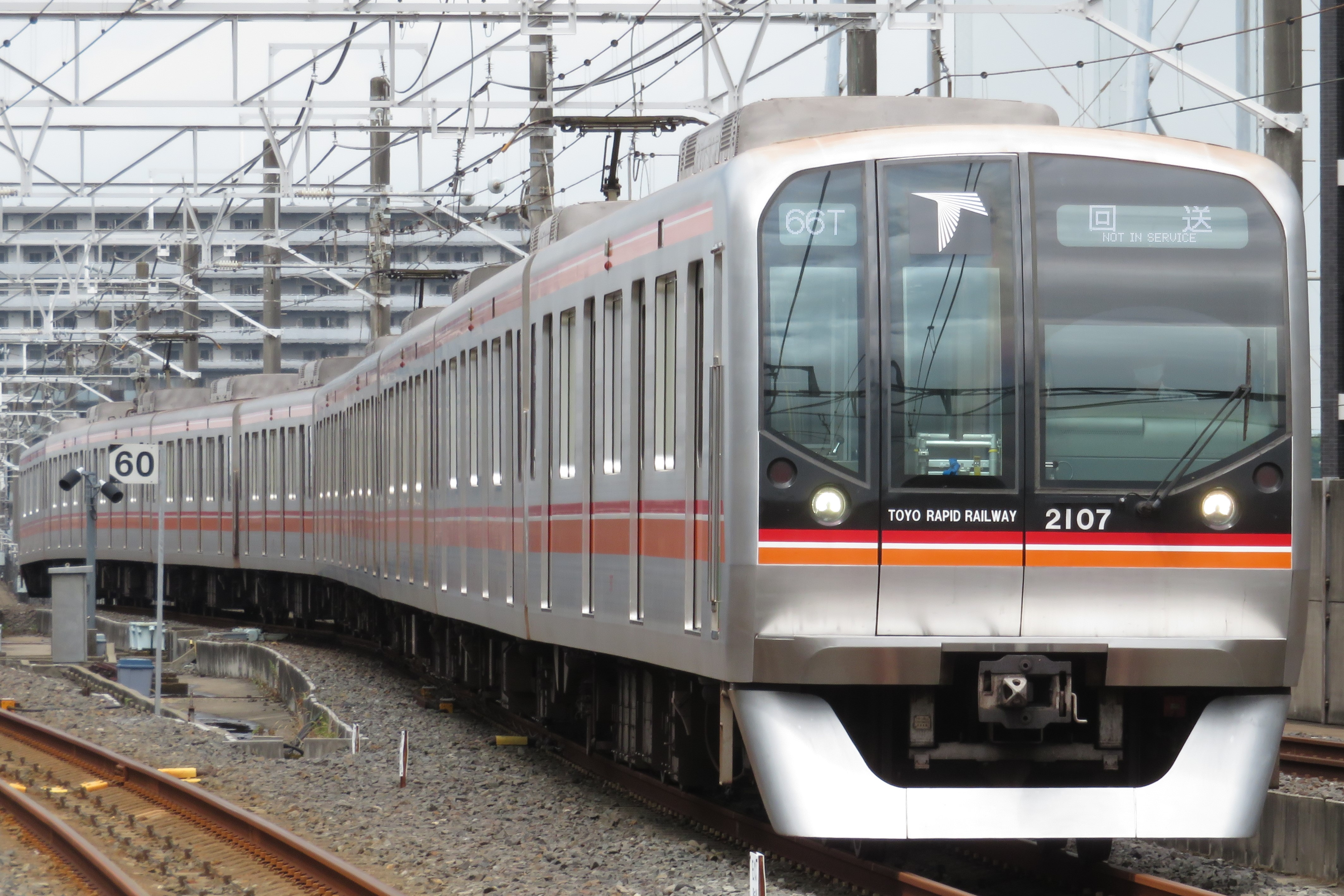
Toyo Rapid 2000 series

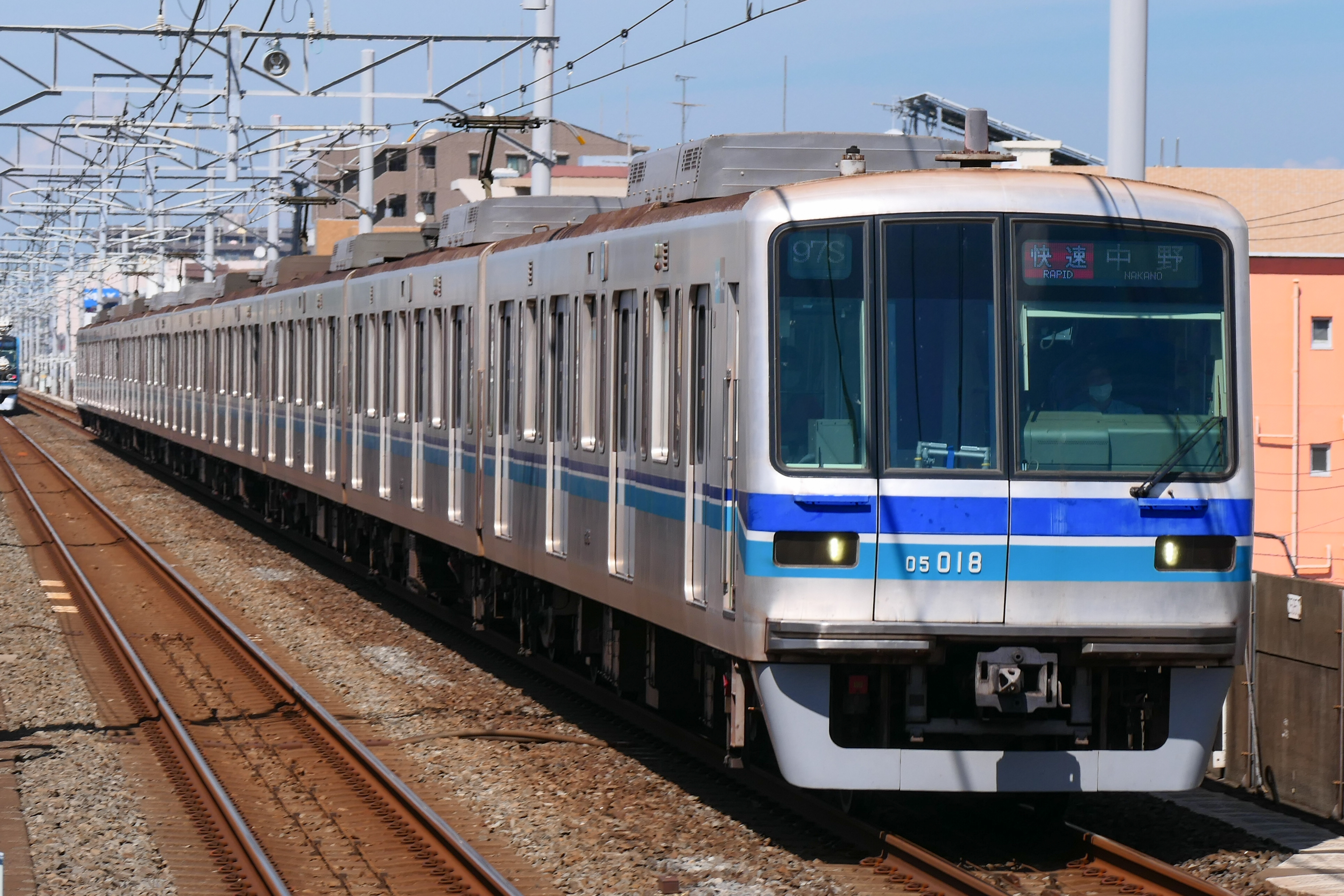
Tokyo Metro 05 series

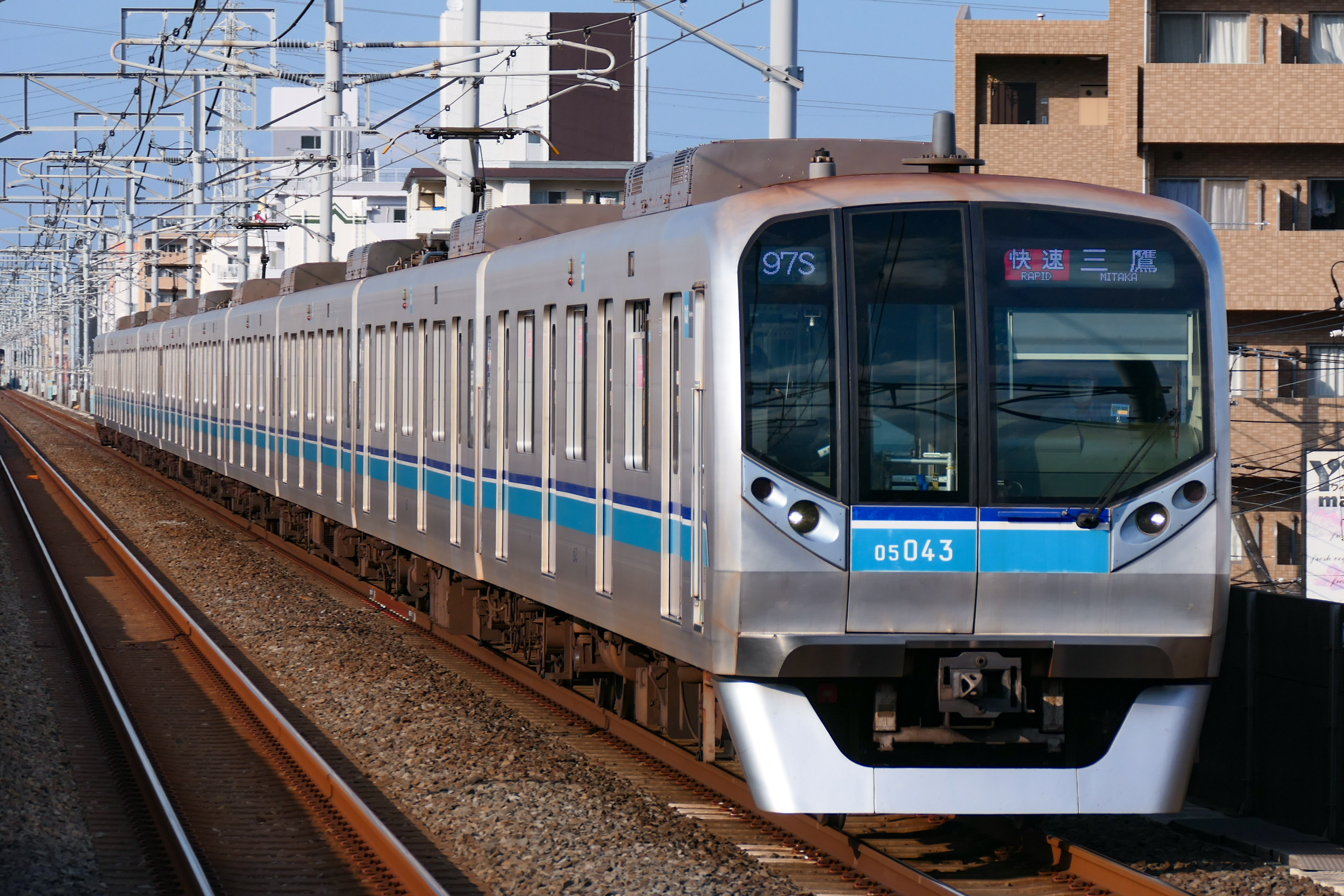
Tokyo Metro 05N series

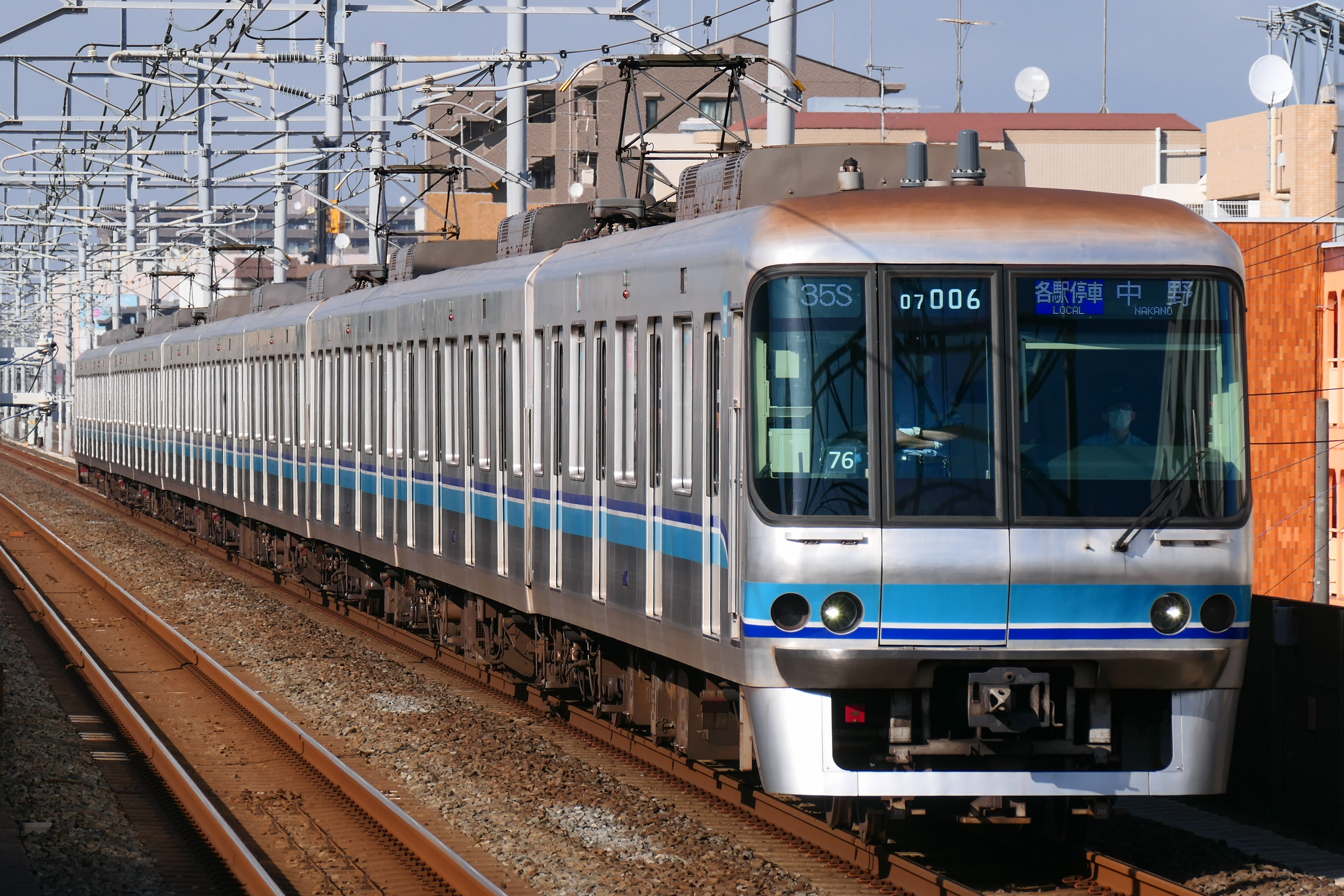
Tokyo Metro 07 series

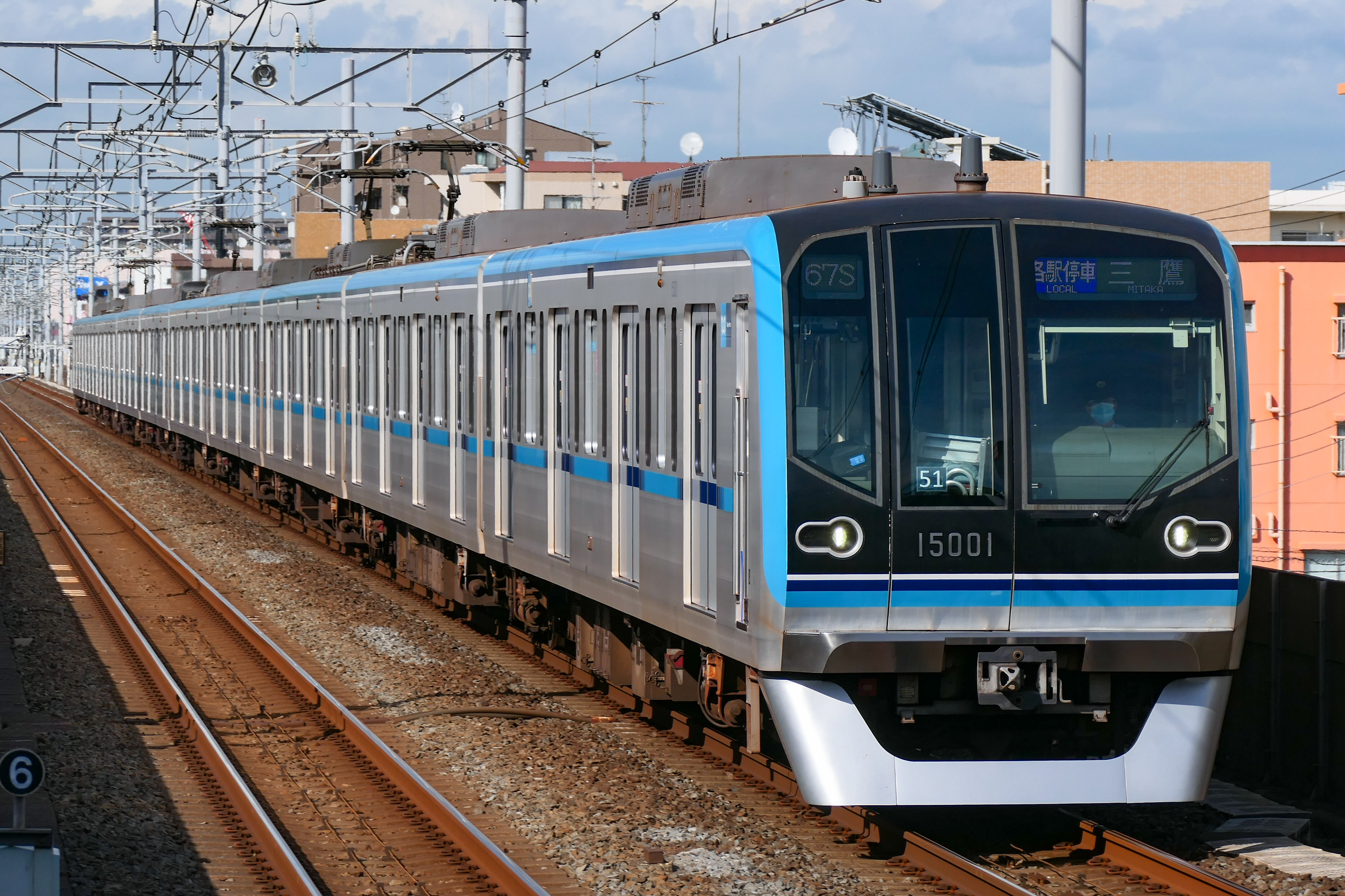
Tokyo Metro 15000 series

=== Former ===
- Tōyō Rapid 1000 series (retired in 2006)
- Tokyo Metro 5000 series (retired in 2007)
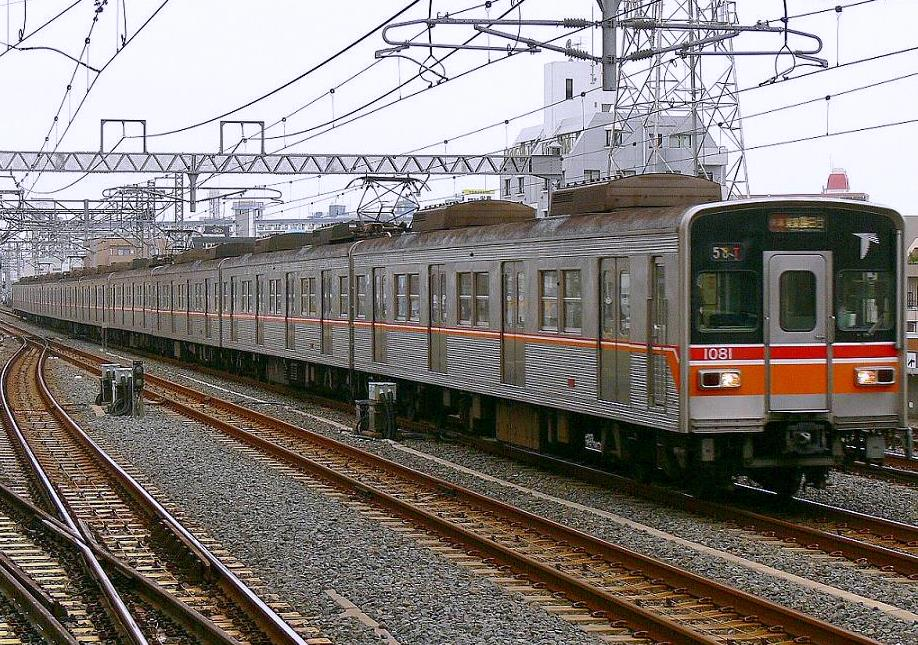
Toyo Rapid 1000 series, September 2006

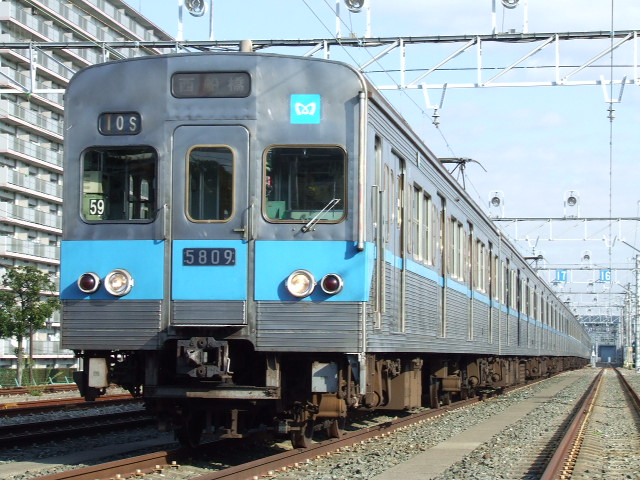
Tokyo Metro 5000 series, December 2006

== History ==
Construction work on the line commenced in July 1984, and the line was fully opened on 27 April 1996. Limited-stop "Toyo Rapid" (東葉快速, Tōyō Kaisoku) services were introduced on the line from the start of the 4 December 1999 timetable revision. Such services in the "up" direction (toward Tokyo) were discontinued in 2009, and the "down" limited-stop services were discontinued from the start of the revised timetable on 15 March 2014.
