= Yachiyo-Midorigaoka Station =

Railway station in Yachiyo, Chiba Prefecture, Japan

TR06 Yachiyo-Midorigaoka Station 八千代緑が丘駅
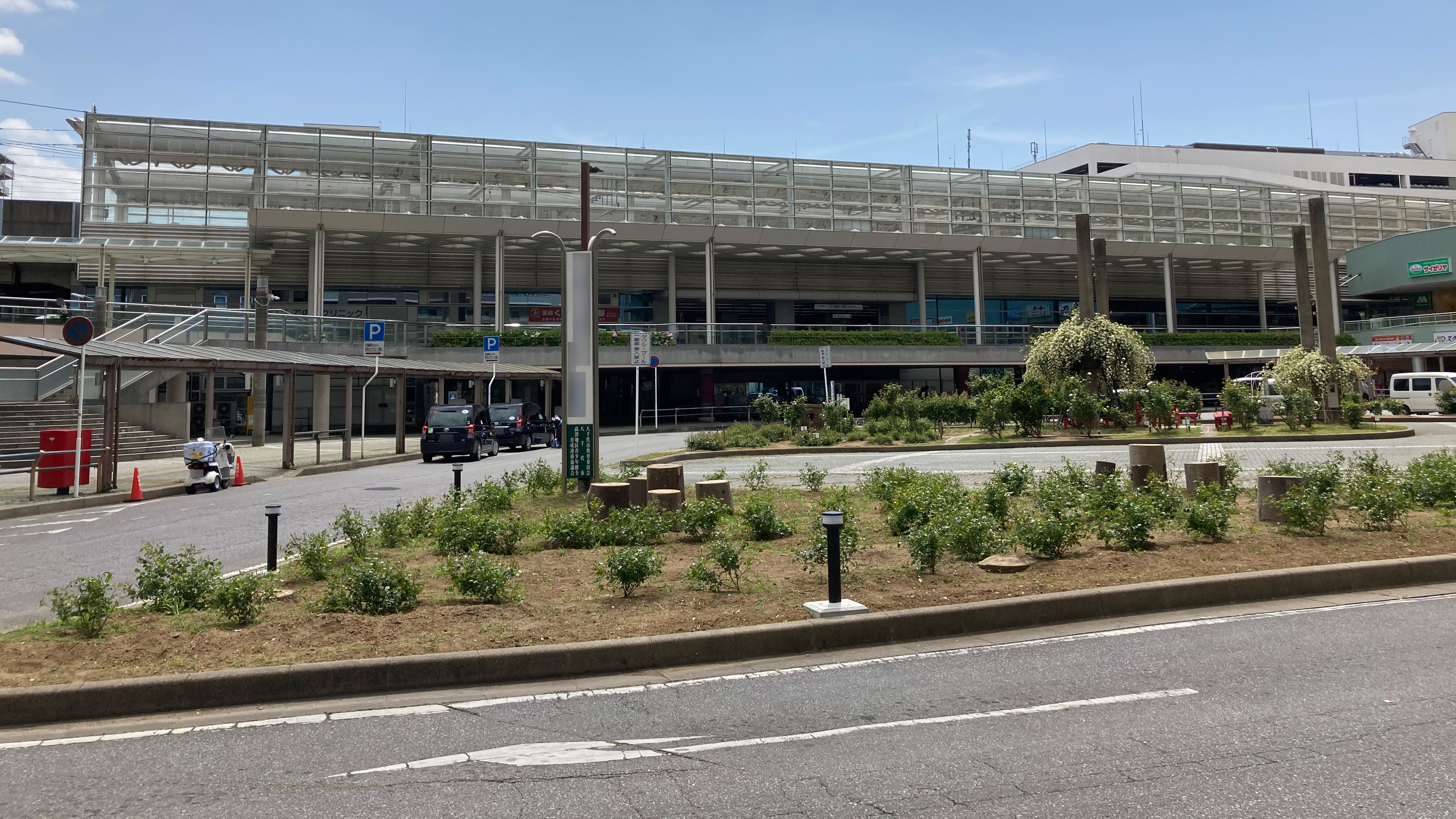
- The north-side view of the station, April 2021

General information
- Location: 1-1104-3 Midorigaoka, Yachiyo-shi, Chiba-ken 276-0049; Japan
- Coordinates: 35.7288°N 140.0737°E
- Operator: Tōyō Rapid Railway
- Line: Tōyō Rapid Railway Line
- Distance: 11.0 km (6.8 mi) from Nishi-Funabashi
- Platforms: 2 island platforms
- Tracks: 4

Construction
- Structure type: Elevated

Other information
- Station code: TR06
- Website: Official website

History
- Opened: 27 April 1996; 30 years ago

Passengers
- FY2018: 40,433 daily

Services
Preceding station	Tōyō Rapid Railway	Following station
Funabashi-Nichidaimae TR05 towards Nishi-Funabashi	Tōyō Rapid Railway Line	Yachiyo-Chūō TR07 towards Tōyō-Katsutadai
Location
- Location within Tokyo Keiyo area Location within Chiba Prefecture Location within Japan

Yachiyo-Midorigaoka Station (八千代緑が丘駅, Yachiyo-Midorigaoka-eki) is a passenger railway station in the city of Yachiyo, Chiba, Japan, operated by the third sector railway operator Tōyō Rapid Railway.

== Lines ==
Yachiyo-Midorigaoka Station is a station on the Tōyō Rapid Railway Line, and is 11.0 kilometres (6.84 mi) from the starting point of the line at Nishi-Funabashi Station.

== Station layout ==
The station has two elevated island platforms serving four tracks, with a station building underneath.

=== Platforms ===
1/2	Tōyō Rapid Railway Line	for Tōyō-Katsutadai
3/4	Tōyō Rapid Railway Line	for Kita-Narashino, Nishi-Funabashi, Ōtemachi, and Nakano

== History ==
Yachiyo-Midorigoka Station was opened on April 27, 1996.

== Passenger statistics ==
In fiscal 2018, the station was used by an average of 40,433 passengers daily.

== Surrounding area ==
- Yachiyo Municipal Midorigaoka Elementary School
- Yachiyo Municipal Takatsu Middle School

== See also ==
- List of railway stations in Japan
