= Yachiyo, Chiba =

Yachiyo 八千代市
- City
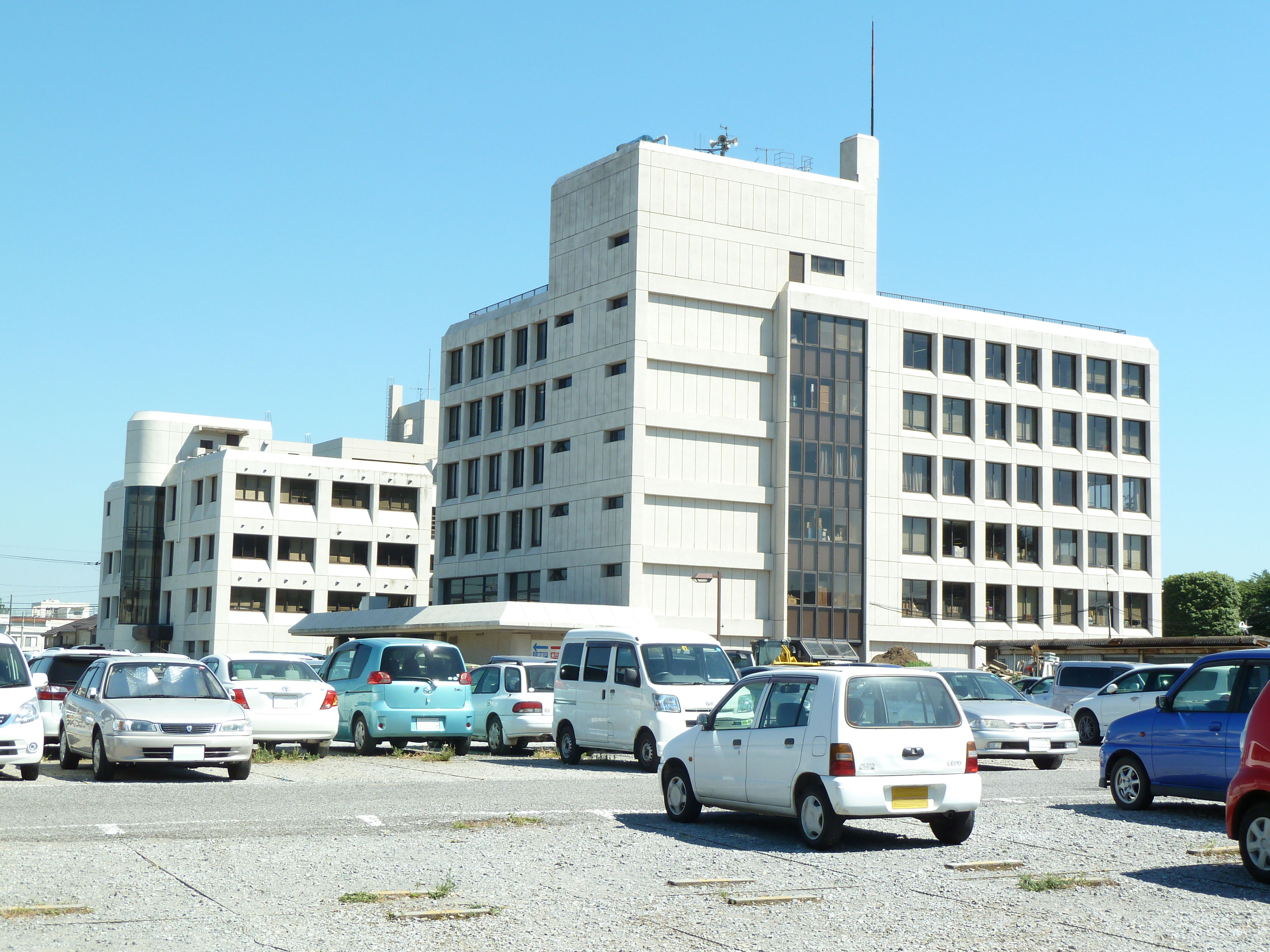
- Yachiyo City Hall

- Flag Emblem

- Location of Yachiyo in Chiba Prefecture

- Coordinates: 35°43′20.7″N 140°05′59.6″E
- Country: Japan
- Region: Kantō
- Prefecture: Chiba

Government
  - Mayor: Tomonori Hattori (since May 2017)

Area
  - Total: 51.39 km^{2} (19.84 sq mi)

Population (December 31, 2023)
  - Total: 205,748
  - Density: 4,004/km^{2} (10,370/sq mi)
- Time zone: UTC+9 (Japan Standard Time)
- -Tree: Azalea
- Flower: Rose
- Phone number: 047-483-1151
- Address: 312-5 Ōwadashinden, Yachiyo-shi, Chiba-ken 276-8501
- Website: Official website

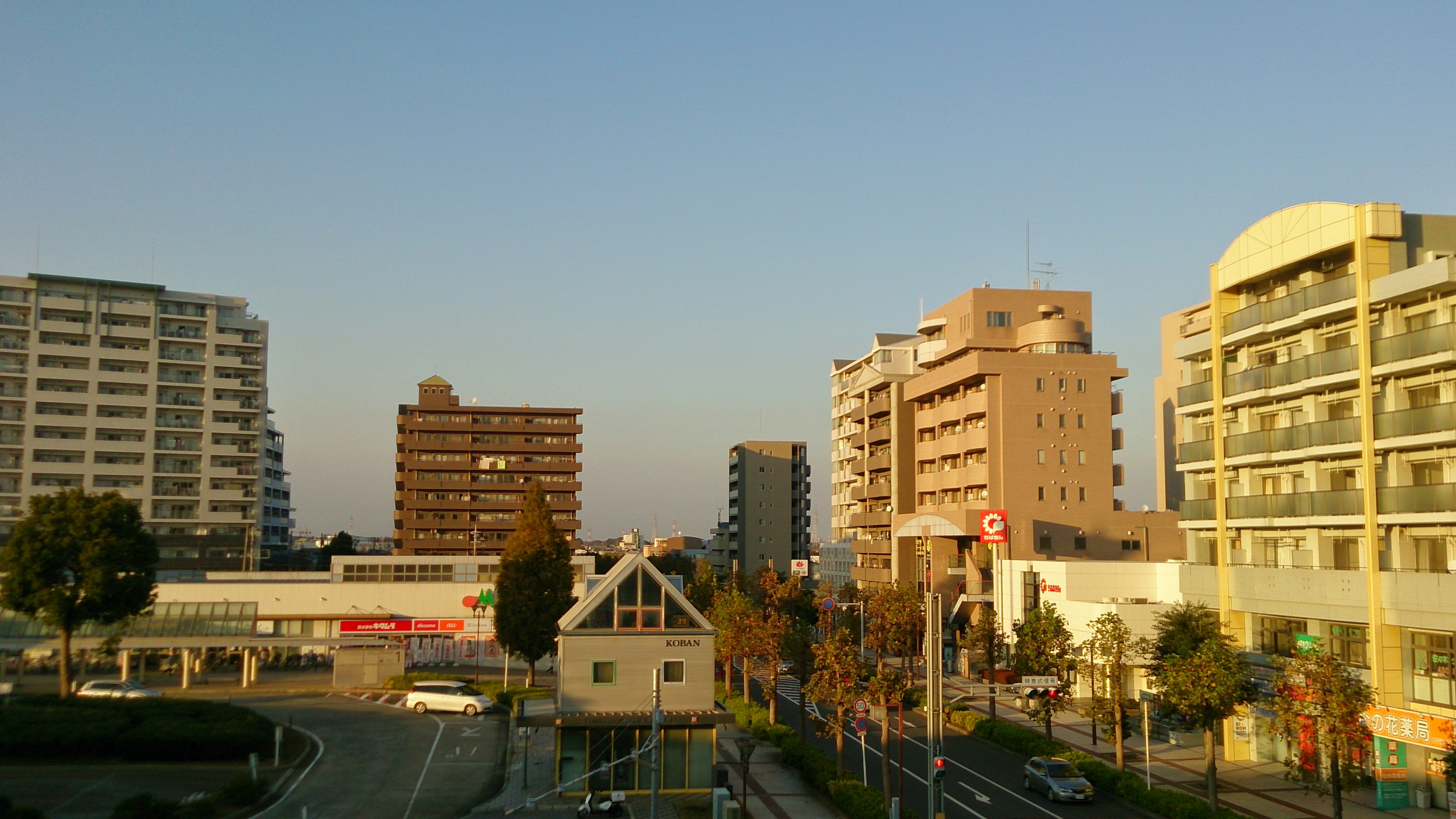
central Yachiyo

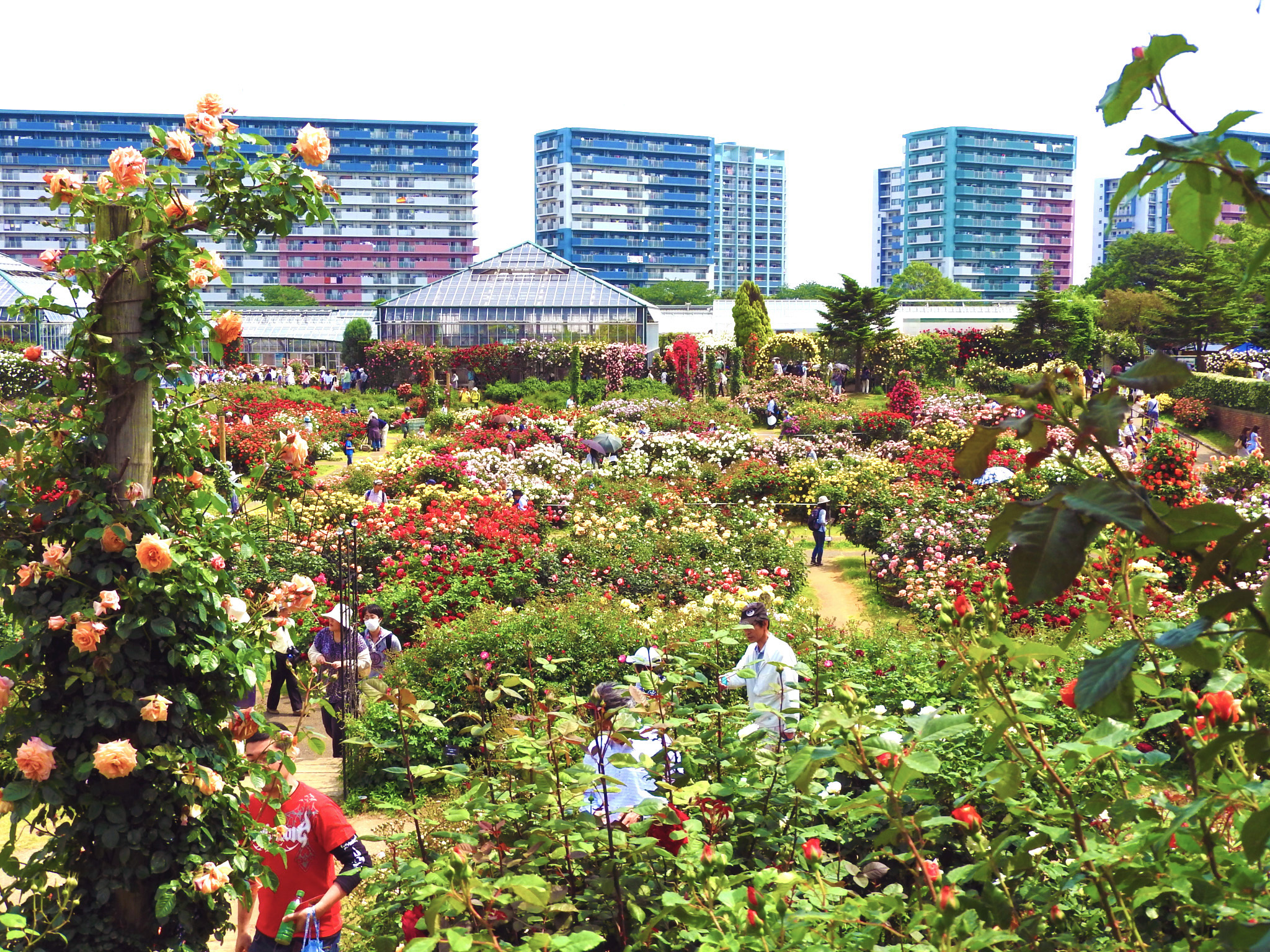
Keisei Rose Gardens

Yachiyo (八千代市, Yachiyo-shi) is a city located in Chiba Prefecture, Japan. As of 31 December 2023, the city had an estimated population of 205,748 in 96,903 households and a population density of 4000 persons per km^{2}. The total area of the city is 51.39 square kilometres (19.84 sq mi).

== Geography ==
Yachiyo is located inland in northwestern Chiba Prefecture on the Shimōsa Plateau, about 13 kilometers from the prefectural capital at Chiba and 33 kilometers from central Tokyo. The Shin River, 10 kilometers (6.2 mi) in length, flows through Yachiyo and forms the upper part of the Inba Discharge Channel. Pollution was once problematic along the river, caused by phosphorus, potassium, and nitrogen draining from vegetable farms along its length. A 19 kilometers (12 mi) walking path was built by the city of Yachiyo and features a pedestrian suspension bridge with an observation platform.

=== Neighboring municipalities ===
Chiba Prefecture

- Funabashi
- Hanamigawa-ku
- Inzai
- Narashino
- Sakura
- Shiroi

=== Climate ===
Yachiyo has a humid subtropical climate (Köppen Cfa) characterized by warm summers and cool winters with light to no snowfall. The average annual temperature in Yachiyo is 14.9 °C. The average annual rainfall is 1394 mm with September as the wettest month. The temperatures are highest on average in August, at around 26.5 °C, and lowest in January, at around 4.5 °C.

== Demographics ==
Per Japanese census data, the population of Yachiyo has grown rapidly over the past 70 years.

Historical population
Year	Pop.	±%
1950	14,792	—
1960	21,709	+46.8%
1970	66,995	+208.6%
1980	134,479	+100.7%
1990	148,615	+10.5%
2000	168,848	+13.6%
2010	189,781	+12.4%
2020	199,489	+5.1%

== History ==
=== Early history ===
Yachiyo has been inhabited since the Japanese Paleolithic period, and archaeologists have found stone tools dating to over 30,000 years ago. The Chiba clan controlled the area of present-day Yachiyo from the late Heian period to the early Muromachi period. In the Sengoku period, the area came under the control of the Murakami clan.

=== Edo period ===
During the Edo period the area was divided between tenryō territory under the direct control of the Tokugawa shogunate and areas controlled under the Sakura Domain. It developed as a post town on the pilgrimage route to the temples at Narita.

=== Modern history ===
After the Meiji Restoration, the villages of Owada in Chiba District and Aso in Inba District, Chiba Prefecture were founded on April 1, 1889 with the creation if then modern municipalities system. However, much of the area of these villages was already under the control of the Imperial Japanese Army, who had established a training school in 1876 for infantry maneuvers. The school remained an active military installation until 1945. Yachiyo Town was created by the merger of Owada Town with Aso and Mutsu villages in 1954. Yachiyo was elevated to city status on January 1, 1967.

== Government ==
Yachiyo has a mayor-council form of government with a directly elected mayor and a unicameral city council of 28 members. Yachiyo contributes three members to the Chiba Prefectural Assembly. In terms of national politics, the city is part of Chiba 2nd district of the lower house of the Diet of Japan.

== Economy ==
Yachiyo is a regional commercial center and a bedroom community for nearby Chiba and Tokyo. The commuting rate to Tokyo is 26.6% (2010 census). There is some residual agriculture, with rice and nashi pears grown. Pearl Musical Instrument Company is located within Yachiyo.

== Education ==
=== Universities ===
- Shumei University, Yachiyo main campus - (Private)

=== Primary and secondary education ===
Isumi has 22 public elementary schools and 13 public middle schools operated by the city government, and six public high schools operated by the Chiba Prefectural Board of Education. The prefecture also operates one special education school for the handicapped.

== Transportation ==
=== Railway ===
Keisei Electric Railway - Keisei Main Line

- Yachiyodai - Keisei Ōwada - Katsutadai

Tōyō Rapid Railway Company - Tōyō Rapid Railway Line

- Yachiyo-Midorigaoka - Yachiyo-Chūō - Murakami - Tōyō-Katsutadai

=== Highway ===
- National Route 16
- National Route 296

== Local attractions ==
- Shūkaku-in Buddhist temple. Its wooden statue of the Shaka Nyorai is a designated prefectural treasure.

== Notable people from Yachiyo ==
- Sorato Anraku, professional rock climber
- Eitoku, actor, stunt performer and suit actor (Real Name: Hisanori Ōiwa, Nihongo: 大岩 永徳, Ōiwa Hisanori)
- Yusuke Kobori, professional boxer
- Seiya Kondō, professional shogi player
- Yaoya Oshichi, Edo-period arsonist
- Keiichi Sanada, professional shogi player
- Natsumi Tsunoda, judoka
- Norio Takahashi, former soccer player
- Takashi Takeuchi, Visual novel developer, manga artist and founder of TYPE-MOON
- Shunsuke Ueda, professional soccer player (Tegevajaro Miyazaki, J3 League)
- Kodai Watanabe, professional soccer player (Thespakusatsu Gunma, J2 League)
- Ikumi Yamazaki, professional tennis player
- Yuji Yasuraoka, former professional wrestler

== Sister cities ==
- Tyler, Texas, United States, since 1992
- Bangkok, Thailand, since 2008
