= Tōyō-Katsutadai Station =

Railway station in Yachiyo, Chiba Prefecture, Japan

TR09 Tōyō-Katsutadai Station 東葉勝田台駅
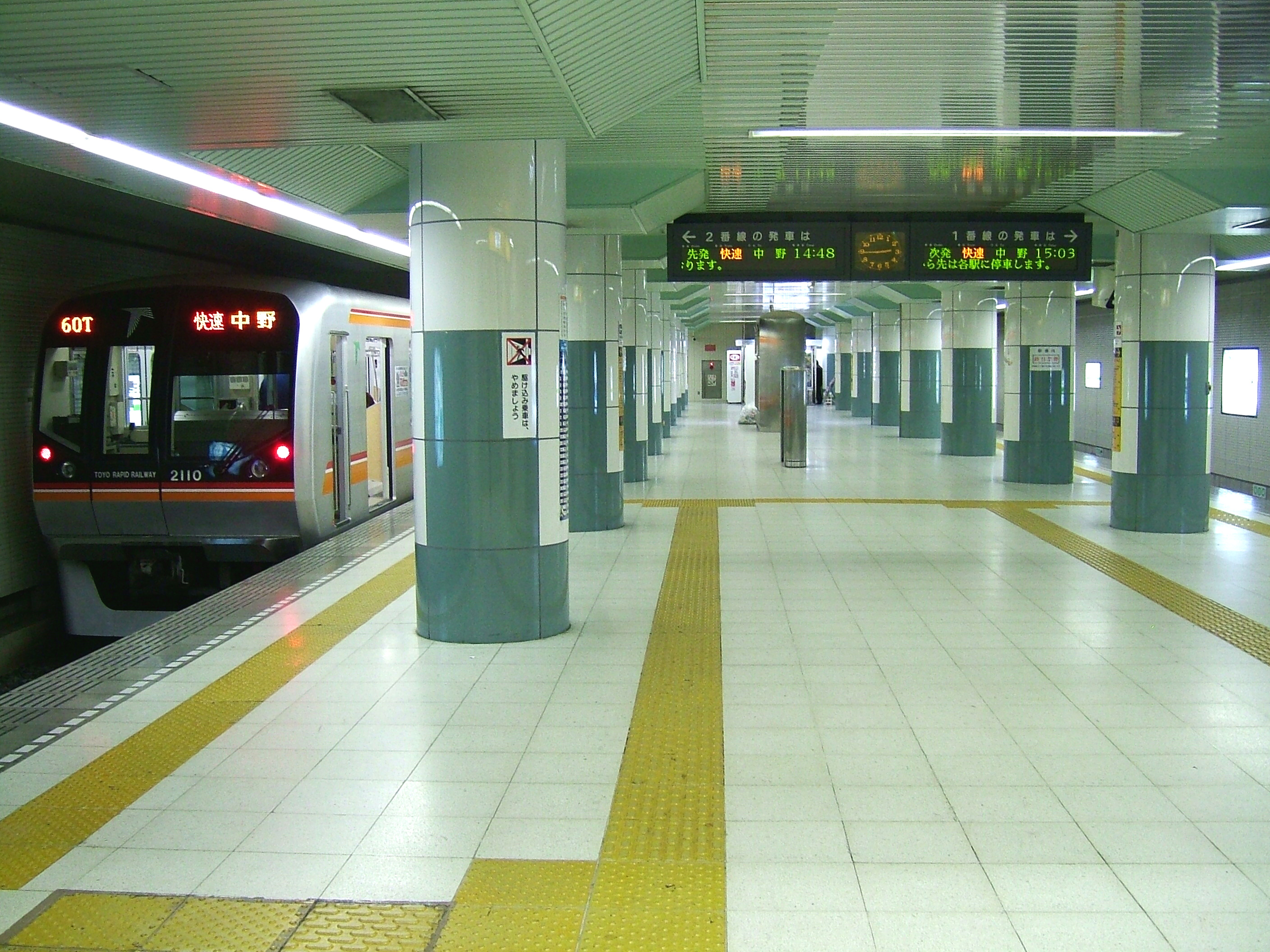
- Tōyō-Katsutadai platform

General information
- Location: 3-2-5 Katsutadaikita, Yachiyo-shi, Chiba-ken 276-0020; Japan
- Coordinates: 35.7152°N 140.1262°E
- Operator: Tōyō Rapid Railway
- Line: Tōyō Rapid Railway Line
- Distance: 16.2 km (10.1 mi) from Nishi-Funabashi
- Platforms: 1 island platform
- Tracks: 2
- Connections: KS31 Katsutadai Station

Construction
- Structure type: Underground
- Accessible: Yes

Other information
- Station code: TR09
- Website: Official website

History
- Opened: 27 April 1996; 30 years ago

Passengers
- FY2018: 31,927 daily

Services
Preceding station	Tōyō Rapid Railway	Following station
Murakami TR08 towards Nishi-Funabashi	Tōyō Rapid Railway Line	Terminus
Location
- Location within Tokyo Keiyo area Location within Chiba Prefecture Location within Japan

Tōyō-Katsutadai Station (東葉勝田台駅, Tōyō-Katsutadai-eki) is a passenger railway station in the city of Yachiyo, Chiba, Japan, operated by the third sector railway operator Tōyō Rapid Railway.

== Lines ==
Tōyō-Katsutadai Station is a terminus of the Tōyō Rapid Railway Line, and is 16.2 km from the opposing terminus of the line at Nishi-Funabashi Station.

== Station layout ==
The station is an underground station with a single island platform serving two tracks, located on the second basement level. The ticket barriers are on the first basement level.

=== Platforms ===
1/2	Tōyō Rapid Railway Line	for Yachiyo-Midorigaoka, Kita-Narashino, Nishi-Funabashi, Ōtemachi, and Nakano

== History ==
Tōyō-Katsutadai Station was opened on April 27, 1996. In 1997, an underground passage was built to the nearby Keisei Main Line Katsutadai Station.

== Passenger statistics ==
In fiscal 2018, the station was used by an average of 31,927 passengers daily.

== Surrounding area ==
- Tōyō-Katsutadai bus terminal
- Yachiyodai High School

== See also ==
- List of railway stations in Japan
