= Nakano Station (Tokyo) =

Railway and metro station in Tokyo, Japan

JC06 JB07 Nakano Station 中野駅

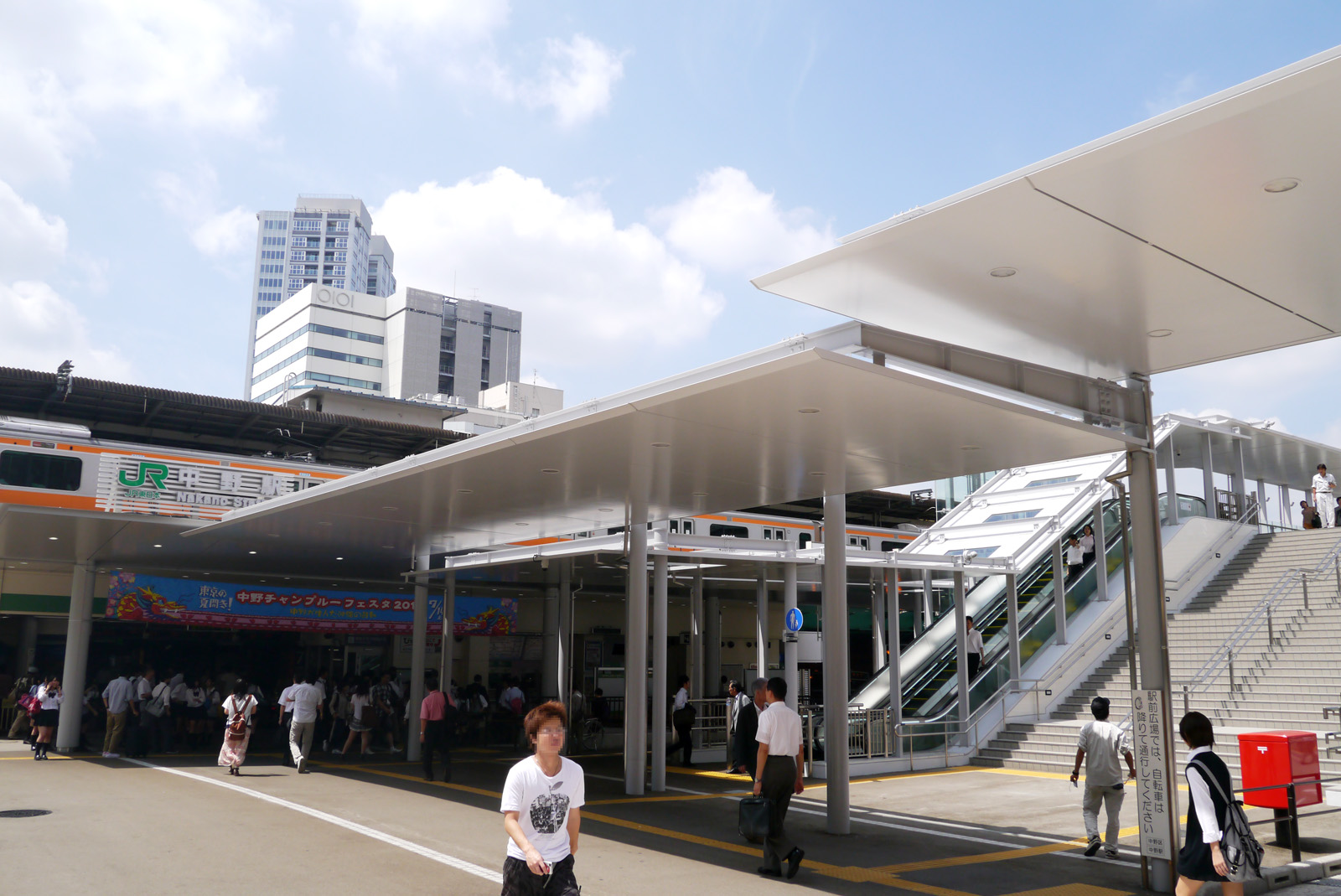
- The north entrance to Nakano Station in July 2012

General information
- Location: 5 Nakano, Nakano City, Tokyo; Japan
- Coordinates: 35°42′22″N 139°39′56″E
- Operator: JR East (manager); Tokyo Metro
- Lines: Chūō Line; Chūō–Sōbu Line; Tōzai Line
- Platforms: 4 island platforms
- Tracks: 8
- Connections: Bus terminal

Other information
- Station code: JC06; JB07; T-01

History
- Opened: 11 April 1889; 137 years ago

Passengers
- FY2024: 406,312 (daily)

Services
| Preceding station | JR East | Following station |
|---|---|---|
| Mitaka JC12 towards Ōtsuki | Chūō Line Chūō Special Rapid | Shinjuku towards Tokyo |
| Mitaka JC12 towards Tachikawa | Chūō Line Ōme Special Rapid | Shinjuku towards Tokyo |
| Ogikubo JC09 towards Ōtsuki | Chūō Line Commuter Rapid | Shinjuku One-way operation |
| Ogikubo JC09 (weekends) towards Ōtsuki | Chūō Line Rapid | Shinjuku towards Tokyo |
| Kōenji JC07 (weekdays) towards Ōtsuki | Chūō Line Rapid | Shinjuku towards Tokyo |
| Kōenji JB06 towards Mitaka | Chūō–Sōbu Line | Higashi-Nakano JB08 towards Chiba |
| Kōenji JB06 towards Mitaka | Chūō–Sōbu Line via Tōzai Line | through to Tozai Line |
| Preceding station | Tokyo Metro | Following station |
| Terminus | Tōzai Line Rapid Commuter Rapid Local | Ochiai towards Nishi-Funabashi |
| through to Chūō-Sōbu Line | Tōzai Line Rapid Commuter Rapid Local | Ochiai towards Nishi-Funabashi |
Location
- Location within Tokyo wards area Location within Japan

Nakano Station (中野駅, Nakano-eki) is a railway station on the Chūō Main Line in Nakano, Tokyo in Japan, operated jointly by East Japan Railway Company (JR East) and the Tokyo subway operator Tokyo Metro.

== Lines ==
Nakano Station is served by the JR East Chūō Line (Rapid) and Chūō-Sōbu Line, and the Tokyo Metro Tōzai Line. There are no turnstiles between lines, allowing for easy transfers.

== Station layout ==
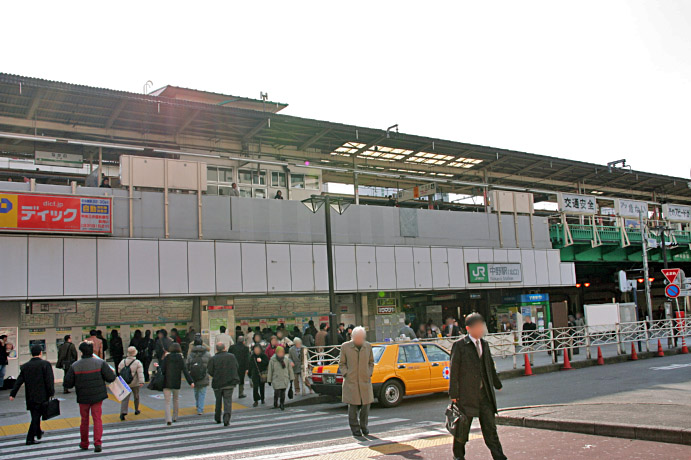
The north entrance in December 2006, before rebuilding

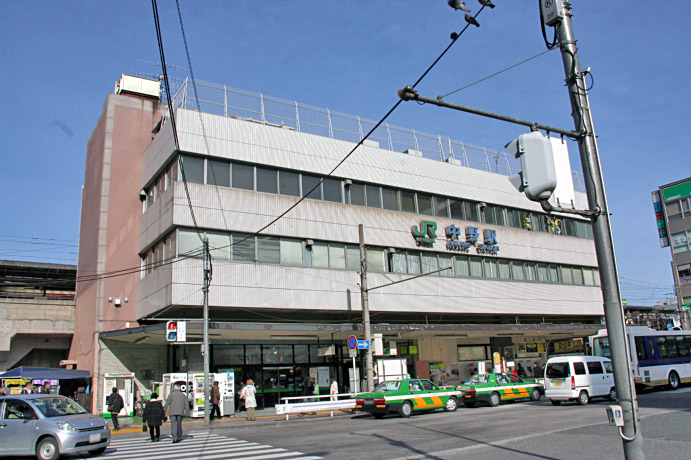
The south entrance in December 2006

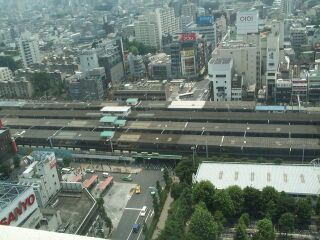
Nakano Station viewed from above in June 2003

The station consists of four island platforms serving eight tracks.

=== Platforms ===
| 1 | Chūō-Sōbu Line | for Mitaka |
| 2 | Chūō-Sōbu Line | for Shinjuku, Akihabara, Kinshichō, Funabashi, and Chiba (originating at this station) |
| 3 | Chūō-Sōbu Line | for Mitaka (through trains from Tōzai Line) |
| 3 | Tōzai Line | for Otemachi, Toyocho, and Nishi-funabashi; Sōbu Line (Local) for Tsudanuma; Toyo Rapid Railway Line for Tōyō-Katsutadai (originating at this station) |
| 4 | Tōzai Line | for Otemachi, Toyocho, and Nishi-funabashi; Sōbu Line (Local) for Tsudanuma; Toyo Rapid Railway Line for Tōyō-Katsutadai (originating at this station) |
| 5 | Chūō-Sōbu Line | for Shinjuku, Akihabara, Kinshichō, Funabashi, and Chiba (originating at Mitaka) |
| 5 | Tōzai Line | for Otemachi, Toyocho, and Nishi-funabashi; Sōbu Line (Local) for Tsudanuma; Toyo Rapid Railway Line for Tōyō-Katsutadai (originating at Mitaka) |
| 6 | Chūō Line (Rapid) | for Tachikawa, Hachiōji, Takao; Ōme Line for Ōme |
| 7-8 | Chūō Line (Rapid) | for Shinjuku, Yotsuya, Ochanomizu, and Tokyo |

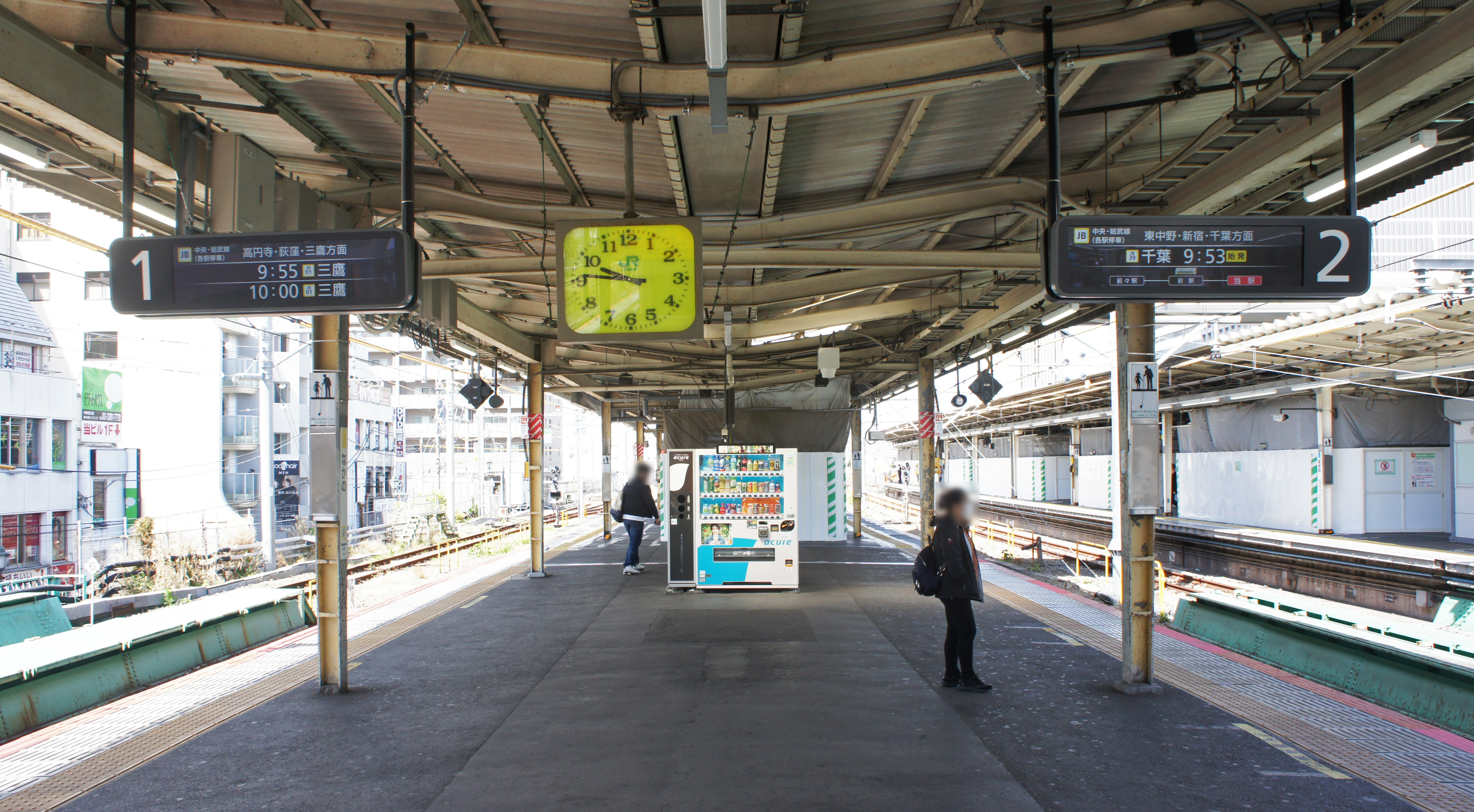
Platforms 1 and 2 (April 2021)

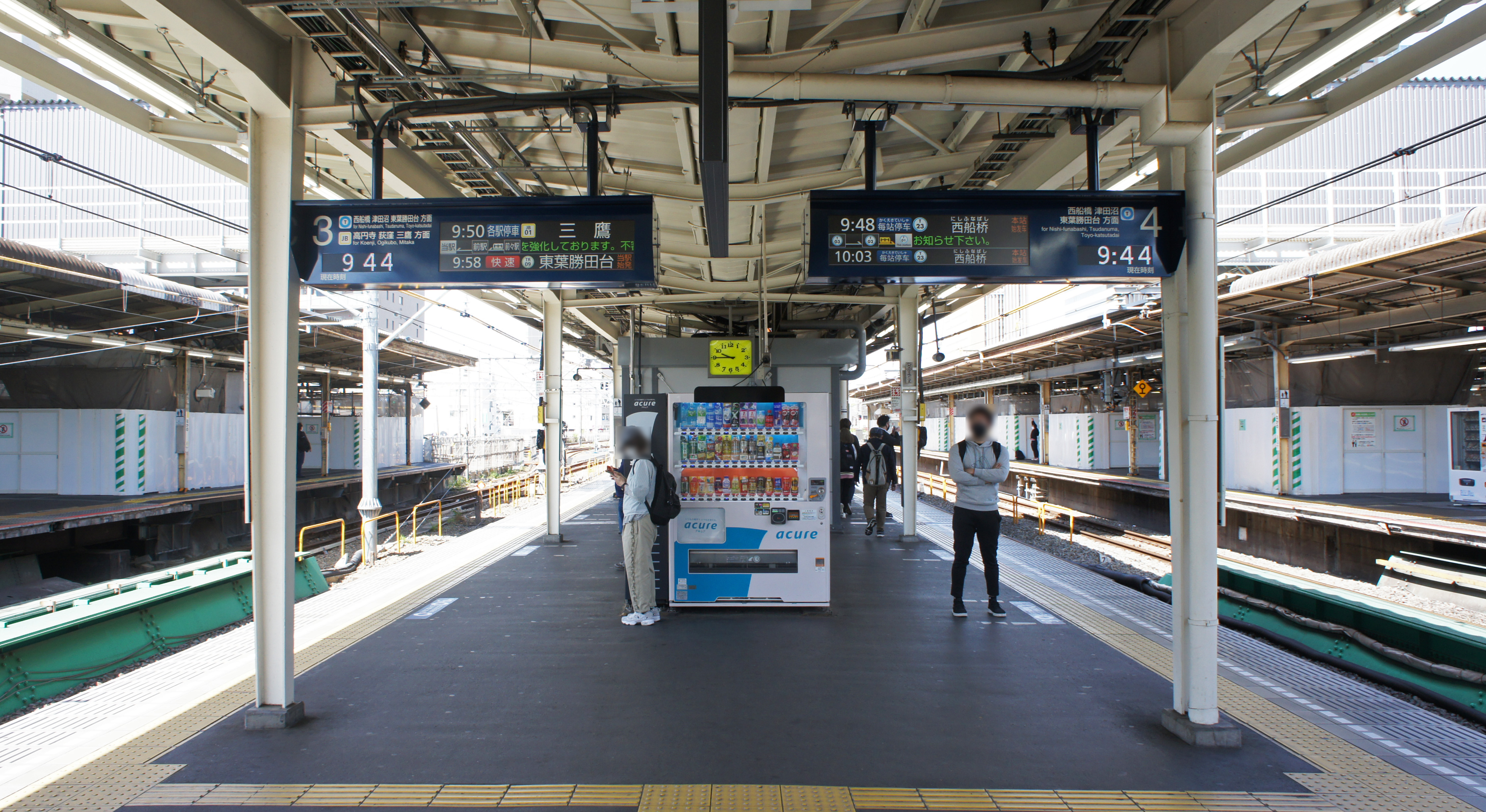
Platforms 3 and 4 (April 2021)

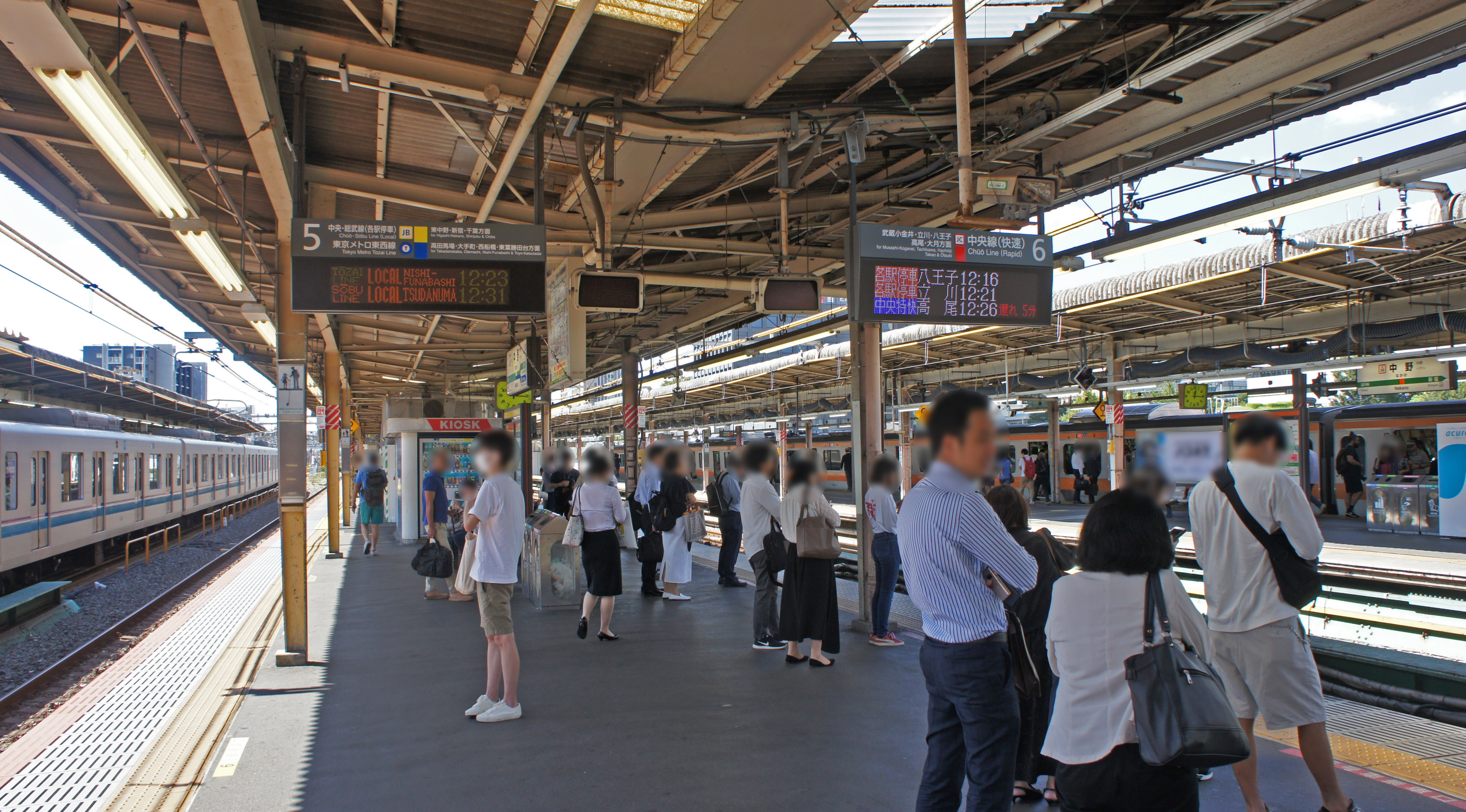
Platforms 5 and 6

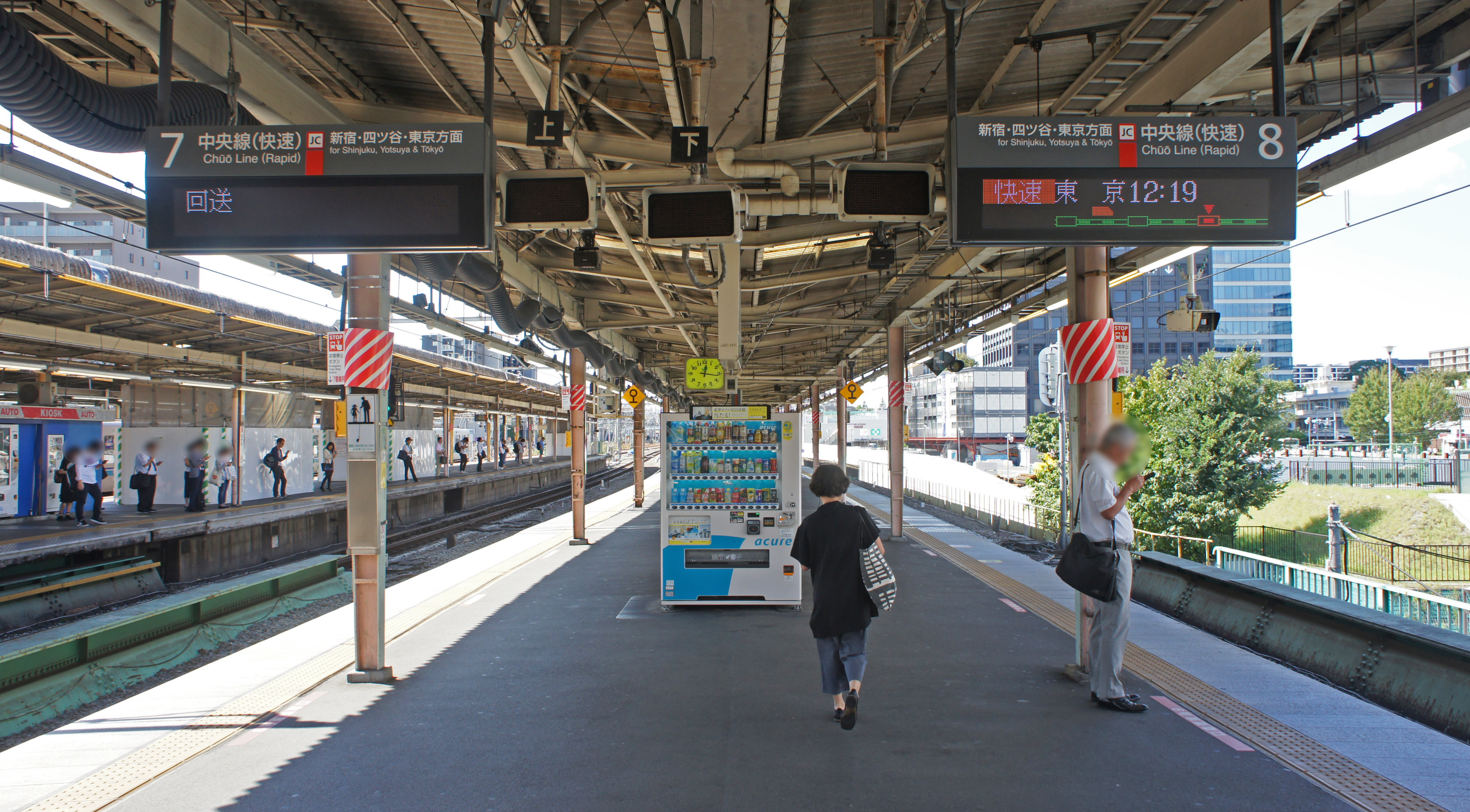
Platforms 7 and 8

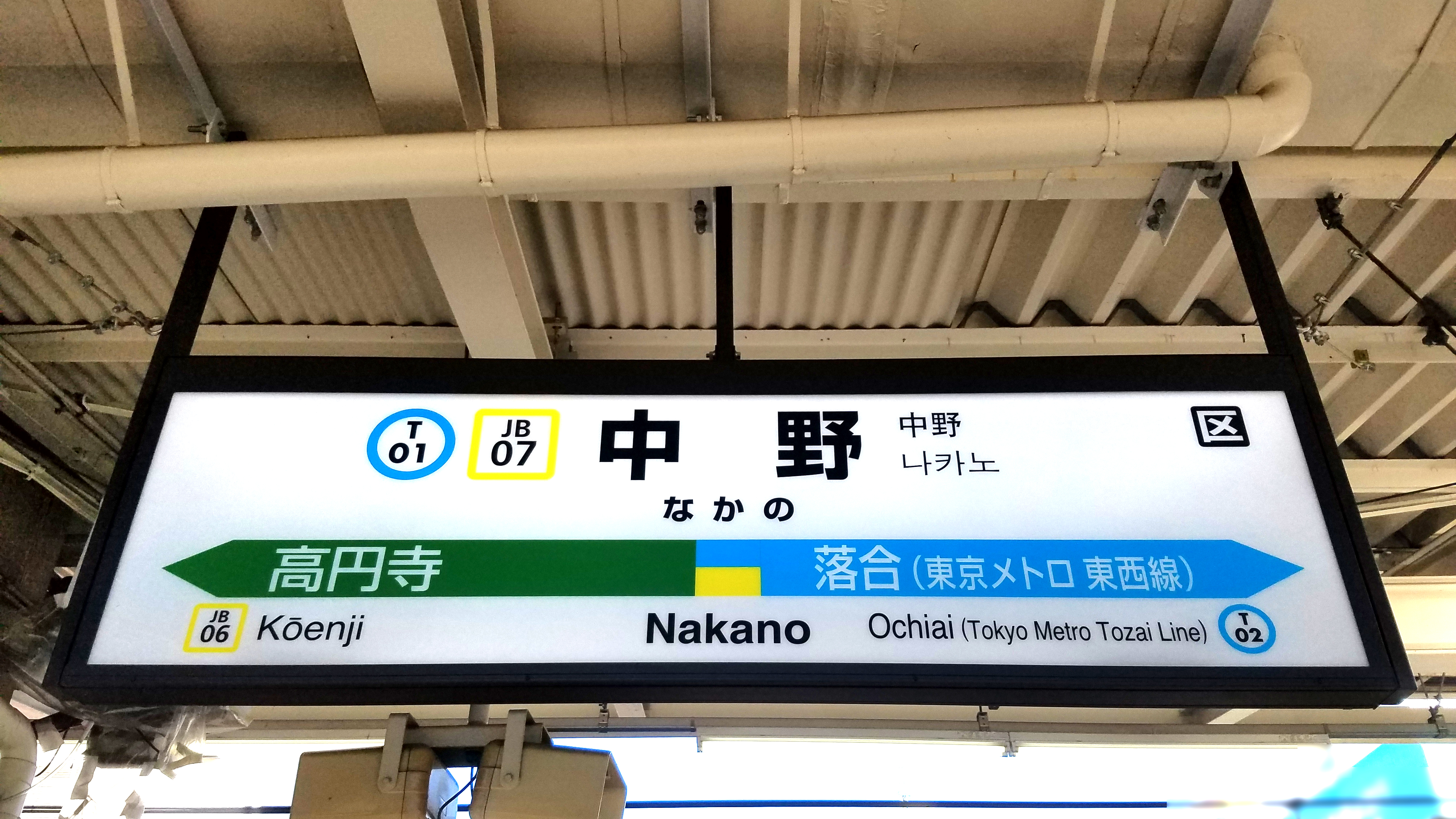
Station sign

Station layout

== Surrounding area ==
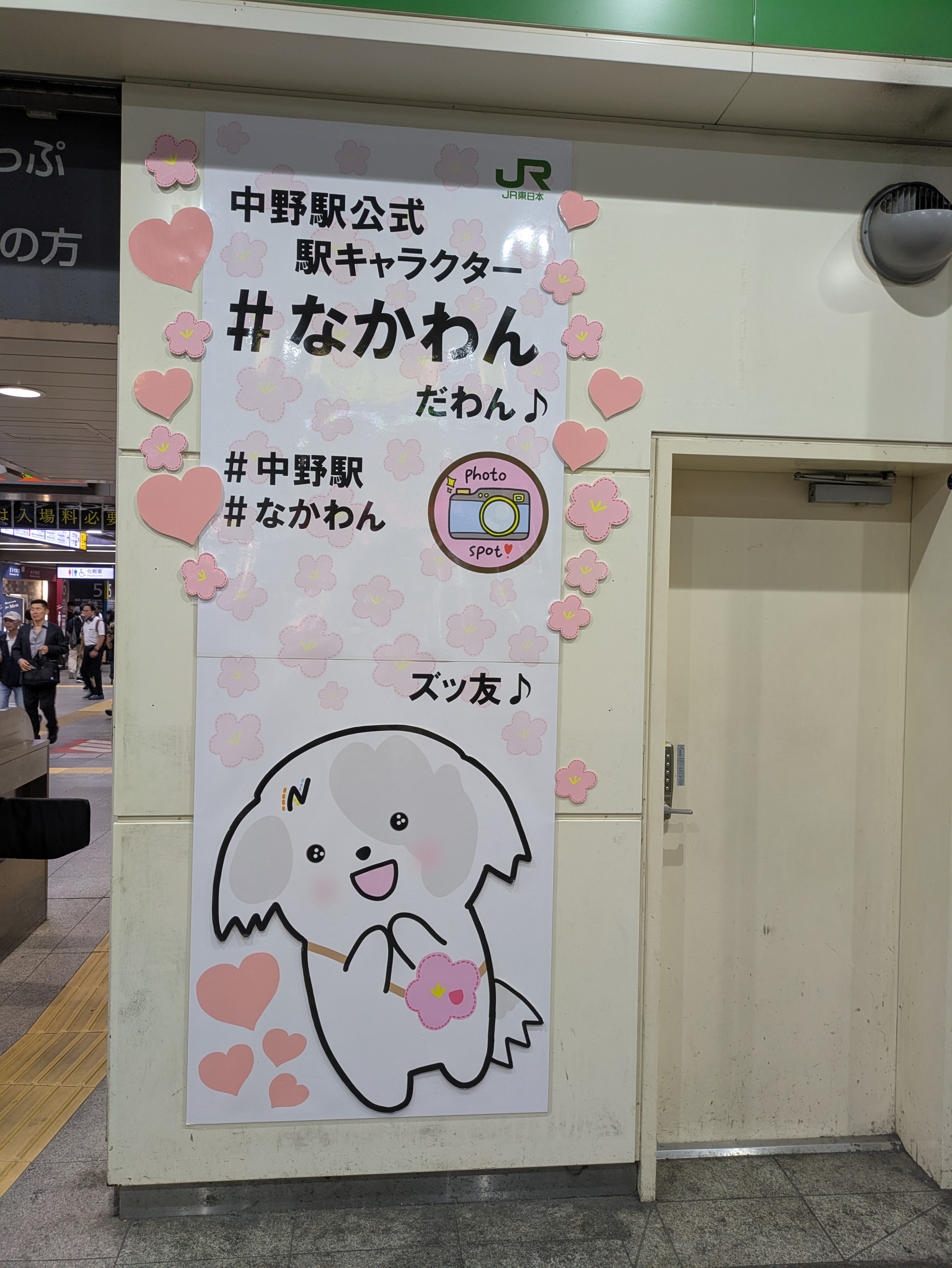
Nakano station official character (2025)

=== North side ===
- Nakano Ward office
- Nakano Sun Plaza, a major concert hall
- Sun Mall and Nakano Broadway, a shopping arcade famous as the home of Mandarake and for used record shops, collectibles, and other items
- Marui Department Store Headquarters

=== South side ===
- Nakano Zero, a cultural hall for concerts and exhibitions
- Nakano Public Library

== History ==
Nakano Station opened on 11 April 1889. The Teito Rapid Transit Authority (TRTA) Tōzai Line began operating from Nakano Station from 16 March 1966.

== Passenger statistics ==
In the 2015 data available from Japan's Ministry of Land, Infrastructure, Transport and Tourism, Nakano → Shinjuku was one of the train segments among Tokyo's most crowded train lines during rush hour.

In fiscal 2017, the JR East station was used by 148,789 passengers daily (boarding passengers only), making it the 21st-busiest station operated by JR East. In fiscal 2013, the Tokyo Metro station was used by an average of 143,802 passengers per day (exiting and entering passengers). Note that the statistics consider passengers who travel through Nakano station on a through service as users of the station, even if they did not disembark at the station. The daily passenger figures for each operator in previous years are as shown below.

| Fiscal year | JR East | Tokyo Metro |
|---|---|---|
| 1999 | 118,219 | |
| 2000 | 117,090 | |
| 2005 | 113,569 | |
| 2010 | 123,968 | |
| 2011 | 122,846 | 133,919 |
| 2012 | 125,025 | 136,994 |
| 2013 | 138,467 | 143,802 |

- Note that JR East figures are for boarding passengers only.

== See also ==
- List of railway stations in Japan
