= Nishi-Funabashi Station =

Railway and metro station in Funabashi, Chiba Prefecture, Japan

JB30 JM10 TR01 Nishi-Funabashi Station 西船橋駅

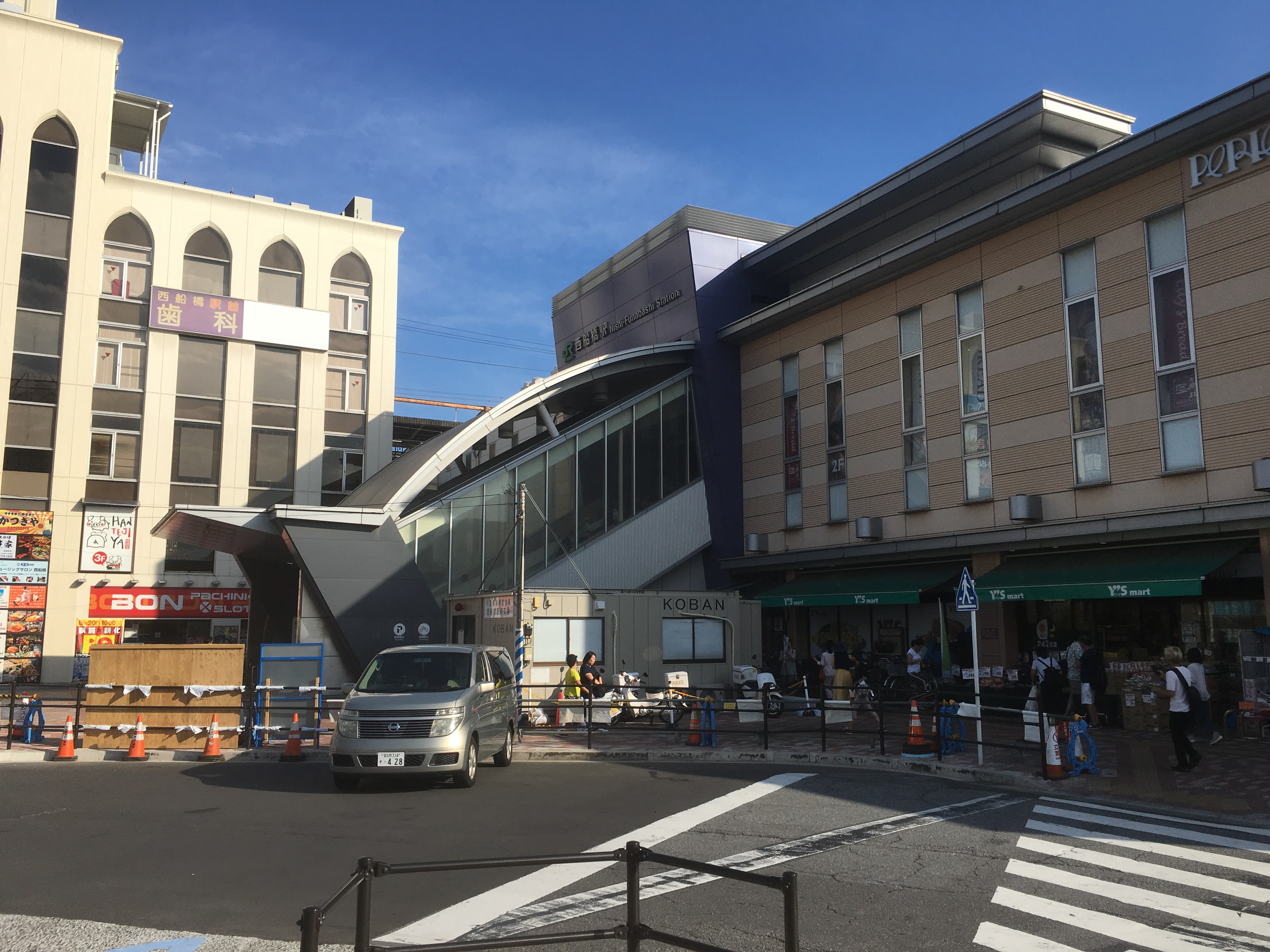
- The north entrance in September 2019

General information
- Location: 4-27-7 Nishifuna; Funabashi, Chiba; Japan
- Coordinates: 35°42′25″N 139°57′32″E
- Operator: JR East; Tokyo Metro; Tōyō Rapid Railway
- Lines: Chūō-Sōbu Line; Musashino Line; Tōzai Line; Tōyō Rapid Railway Line
- Platforms: 6 island platforms

Construction
- Platform levels: 2

Other information
- Station code: JB30 (Chūō-Sōbu Line); JM10 (Musashino Line, Keiyō Line); T-23 (Tozai Line); TR01 (Toyo Rapid Railway Line)

History
- Opened: 10 November 1958; 67 years ago

Services
Preceding station	JR East	Following station
Shimōsa-Nakayama JB29 towards Mitaka	Chūō–Sōbu Line	Funabashi JB31 towards Chiba
through to Tozai Line	Chūō–Sōbu Line via Tōzai Line	Funabashi JB31 towards Tsudanuma
Funabashihōten JM11 towards Ōmiya	Shimōsa	Minami-Funabashi JE11 towards Kaihimmakuhari
Funabashihōten JM11 towards Fuchūhommachi	Musashino Line	Minami-Funabashi JE11 (through service via Keiyō Line) towards Kaihimmakuhari
Funabashihōten JM11 towards Fuchūhommachi	Musashino Line	Ichikawashiohama JE09 (through service via Keiyō Line) towards Tokyo
Preceding station	Tokyo Metro	Following station
Urayasu towards Nakano	Tōzai Line Rapid Commuter Rapid	Terminus
Urayasu towards Nakano	Tōzai Line Rapid Commuter Rapid	through to Chūō-Sōbu Line and Toyo Rapid Railway Line
Baraki-nakayama towards Nakano	Tōzai Line Local	through to Chūō-Sōbu Line and Toyo Rapid Railway Line
Preceding station	Tōyō Rapid Railway	Following station
through to Tozai Line	Tōyō Rapid Railway Line	Higashi-Kaijin TR02 towards Tōyō-Katsutadai
Location
- Location within Tokyo Keiyo area Location within Kanto Area Location within Japan

Nishi-Funabashi Station (西船橋駅, Nishi-Funabashi-eki) is a railway station in Funabashi, Chiba, Japan, jointly operated by East Japan Railway Company (JR East), Tokyo Metro, and the Tōyō Rapid Railway. It is the easternmost station of the Tokyo subway network, lying in Chiba Prefecture.

== Lines ==
Nishi-Funabashi Station is served by the following lines.

- East Japan Railway Company
  - Chūō-Sōbu Line
  - Musashino Line
  - Keiyō Line
- Tokyo Metro
  - Tōzai Line
- Tōyō Rapid Railway
  - Tōyō Rapid Railway Line

== Station layout ==
The station consists of six island platforms serving eleven tracks on two levels (another two tracks are used by Sōbu Line (Rapid) trains which do not stop at the station). The high-level station serves the Keiyō and Musashino Lines. The low level is served by the Sōbu, Tōzai and Tōyō Rapid Railway Lines. The low level can be subdivided into two sections, one served by trains running into Tokyo via the Sōbu Line and the other by trains running into Tokyo via the Tōzai Line, since all the track connections between the two lines are east of the station.

Platforms 1 and 2 are for Sōbu Line trains for Funabashi, Tsudanuma and Chiba, and platforms 3 and 4 for trains for Kinshichō, Akihabara, Shinjuku, Nakano and Mitaka. Platforms 2 and 3 share the same track and are often used to terminate trains from Ochanomizu.

Within the Tokyo Metro section, platform 5 is the main platform for Tōyō services to Kita-Narashino and Tōyō-Katsutadai, while the few trains from the Tōzai Line to Funabashi and Tsudanuma can also leave from here. Platform 6 is mainly used for terminating Tōzai Line trains (to Toyocho, Nihombashi, Otemachi and Nakano), although it is used for through services in peak hours. Platform 7 is mainly used for Tōzai Line trains (mainly for reversing them), and platform 8 is exclusively for Tōzai Line trains.

The high-level station consists of platforms 9 to 12. Normally platforms 9 and 10 are used by Musashino Line trains (to Shim-Matsudo, Minami-Urawa and Fuchūhommachi), platform 11 is used by trains to Tokyo (via Maihama and Shin-Kiba) and platform 12 by trains to Minami-Funabashi, Shin-Narashino and Kaihimmakuhari.

=== Ground-level platforms ===
1/2	Chūō-Sōbu Line	for Tsudanuma and Chiba
3/4	Chūō-Sōbu Line	for Kinshichō, Shinjuku, Nakano and Mitaka
5	Tōyō Rapid Railway Line	for Kita-Narashino and Tōyō-Katsutadai
5	Sōbu Line (Local)	for Tsudanuma (through from the Tozai Line)
6	Tōyō Rapid Railway Line	for Kita-Narashino and Tōyō-Katsutadai
6	Sōbu Line (Local)	for Tsudanuma (through from the Tozai Line)
6	Tozai Line	for Urayasu, Otemachi, Iidabashi, Nakano; Chūō-Sōbu Line for Mitaka
7	Tōyō Rapid Railway Line	for Kita-Narashino and Tōyō-Katsutadai
7	Tozai Line	for Urayasu, Otemachi, Iidabashi, Nakano; Chūō-Sōbu Line for Mitaka
8	Tozai Line	for Urayasu, Otemachi, Iidabashi, Nakano; Chūō-Sōbu Line for Mitaka

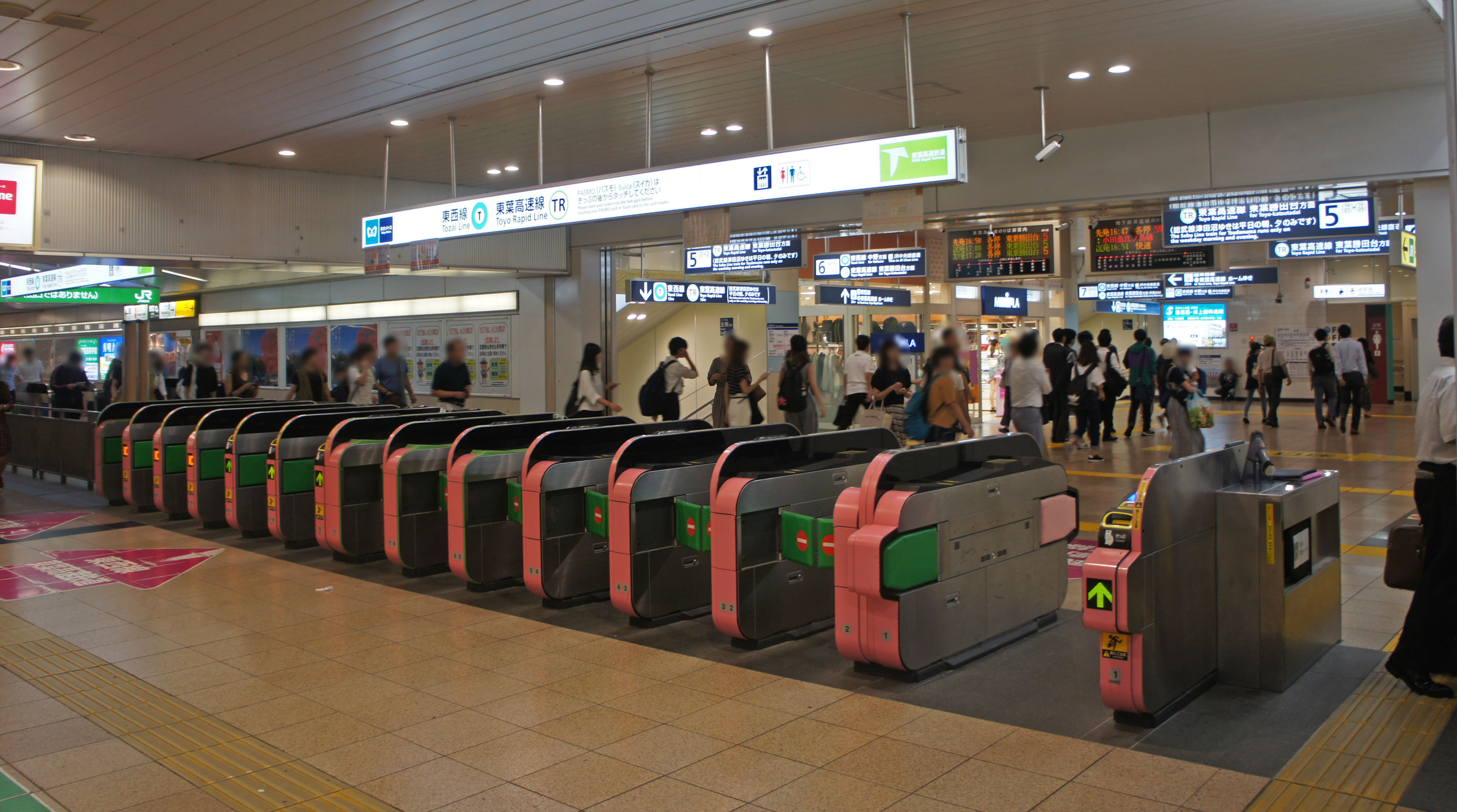
Ticket gates to Tozai Line and Toyo Rapid Line, 2019

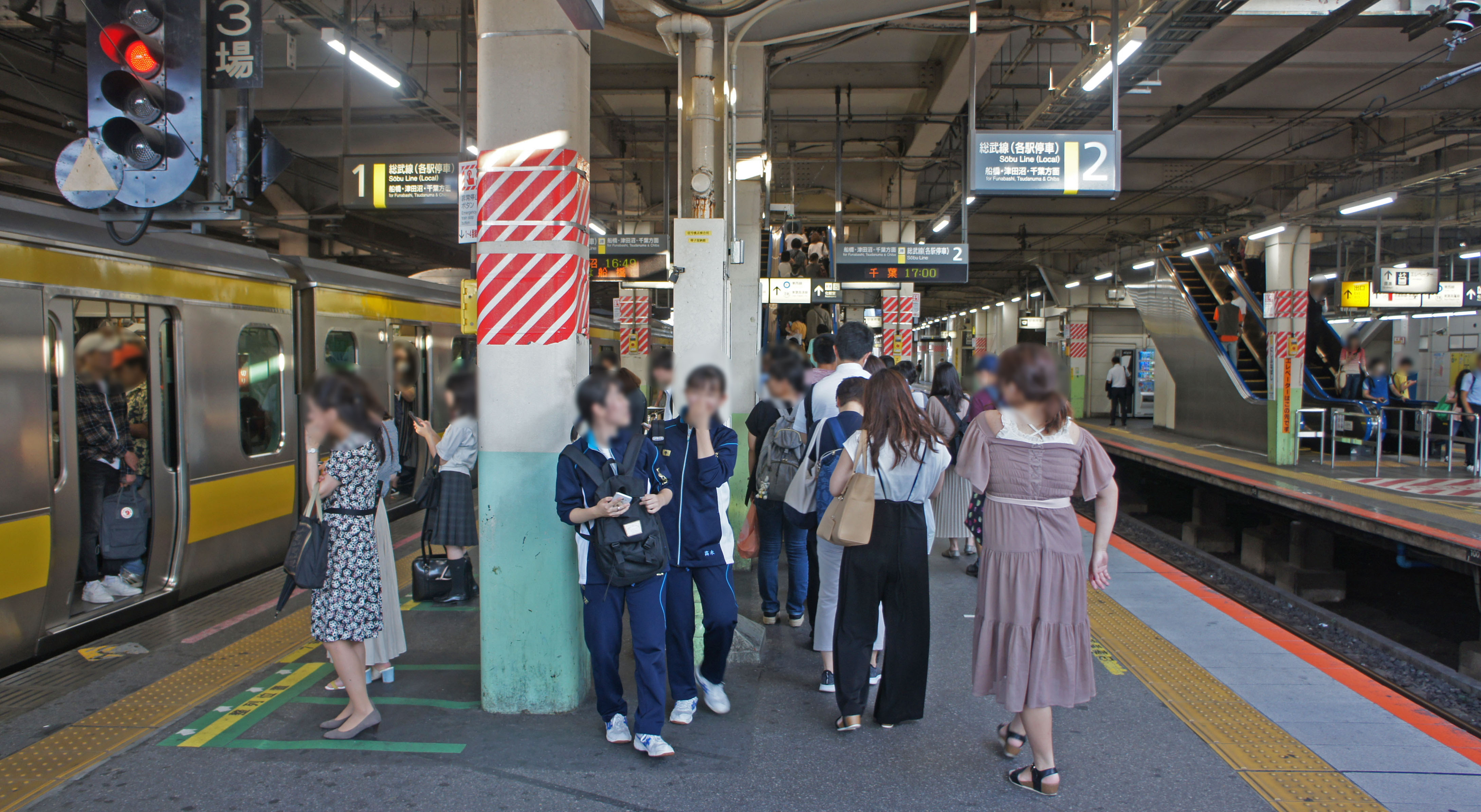
Platforms 1 and 2

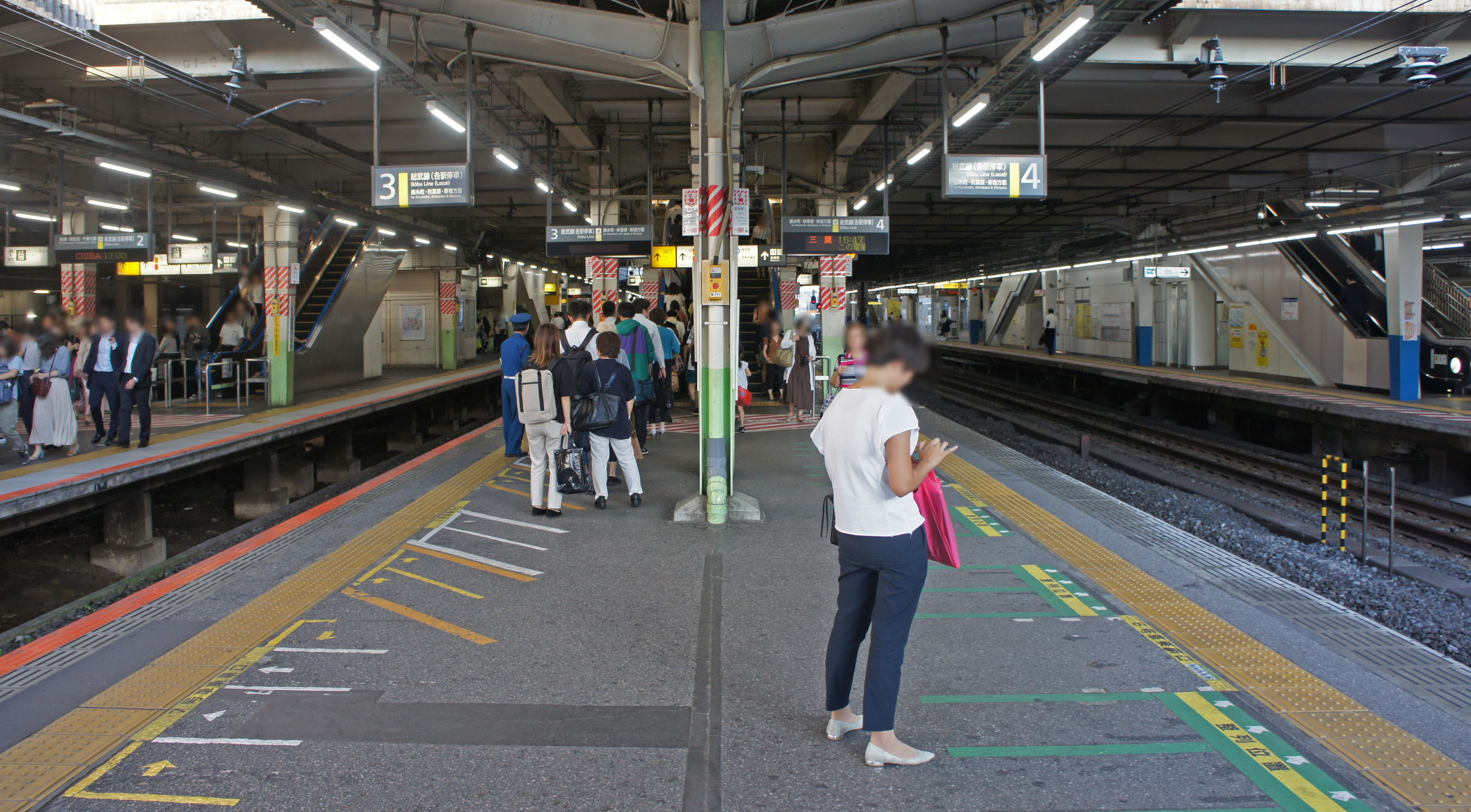
Platforms 3 and 4

Lower level track layout

=== Elevated platforms ===
9-12	Keiyō Line	for Shin-Urayasu, Maihama, Shin-Kiba and Tokyo
9-12	Keiyō Line	for Minami-Funabashi and Kaihimmakuhari
9-12	Musashino Line	for Shim-Matsudo, Musashi-Urawa and Fuchūhommachi

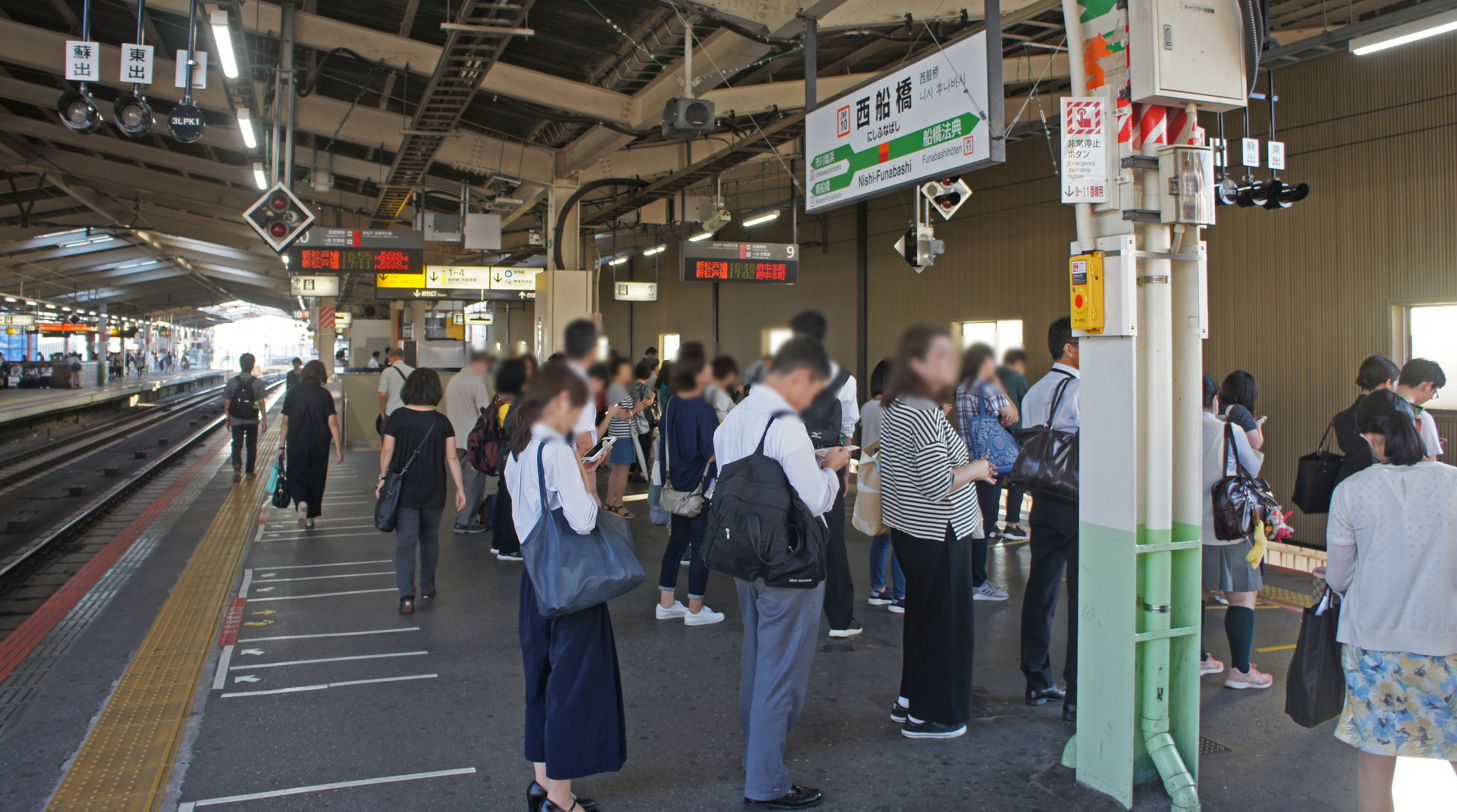
Platforms 9 and 10

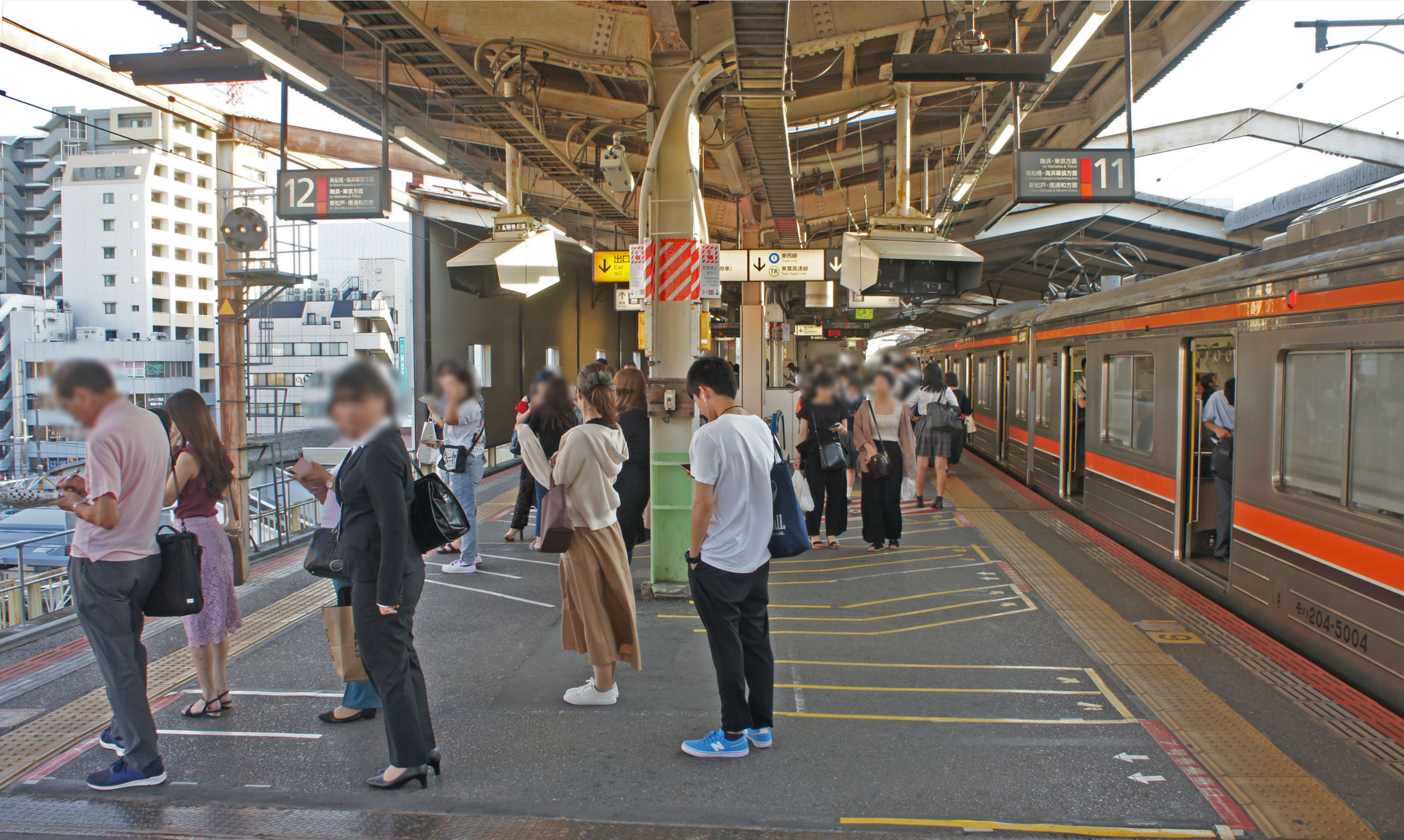
Platforms 11 and 12

Upper level track layout

== History ==
The station opened on the Sobu Line on November 10, 1958, initially serving passengers only. It moved into a new station building on December 15, 1968, when the line was quadrupled.

The Teito Rapid Transit Authority (TRTA) Tozai Line arrived here on March 29, 1969, and through service between the two lines commenced. Freight services commenced on April 8.

The high-level station opened on October 2, 1978, when platforms 9 and 10 (presentday 11 and 12) started being used as the terminus of the Musashino Line. On March 3, 1986, platforms 9 and 10 opened for use by the initial section of the Keiyo Line (from here to Chiba-Minato). Freight services ceased on November 1, 1986.

The next part of the Keiyō Line (Shin-Kiba to Nishi-Funabashi and Minami-Funabashi) opened on December 1, 1988. At the same time, through services began between the Keiyo and Musashino Lines.

The Tōyō Rapid Railway Line opened on April 27, 1996, with through services to the Eidan Tōzai Line from the first day.

The station facilities of the Tozai Line were inherited by Tokyo Metro after the privatization of the Teito Rapid Transit Authority (TRTA) in 2004.

The Dila Nishi-Funabashi station building complex opened on January 15, 2005.

== Passenger statistics ==
In fiscal 2013, the JR East station was used by 130,814 passengers daily (boarding passengers only), making it the 25th-busiest station operated by JR East. In fiscal 2013, the Tokyo Metro station was used by an average of 279,770 passengers per day (exiting and entering passengers). Note that the statistics consider passengers who travel through Nishi-Funabashi station on a through service as users of the station, even if they did not disembark at the station. In fiscal 2011, the Tōyō Rapid Railway station was used by an average of 52,004 passengers daily (boarding passengers only), making it the busiest station operated by the company. The daily passenger figures for JR East and Tokyo Metro in previous years are as shown below.

Fiscal year	JR East	Tokyo Metro
1999	106,351	
2000	106,048	
2005	105,892	
2010	125,855	
2011	125,276	271,057
2012	126,834	274,785
2013	130,814	279,770

- Note that JR East figures are for boarding passengers only.

== Bus terminal ==
=== Highway buses ===
- Airport Limousine; For Haneda Airport
- Polar Star; For Sendai Station
- For Fuji-Q Highland and Kawaguchiko Station
- For Chino, Matsumoto Bus Terminal(Matsumoto Station), Azumino, and Nagano Station
- Fantasia Nagoya; For Hoshigaoka Station, Motoyama Station, Chikusa Station, Sakae Station, and Nagoya Station
- Yamato; For Tenri Station, Kintetsu Nara Station, Nara Station, Kintetsu-Kōriyama Station, Chūgū-ji, Hōryū-ji, Ōji Station, and Goidō Station
- For Senri-Chūō Station, Momoyamadai Station, Shin-Ōsaka Station, Umeda Station, and Sannomiya Station
- South Wave; For Sakaihigashi Station, Sakai Station, Izumigaoka Station, Wakayama Station, and Wakayamashi Station

== See also ==
- List of railway stations in Japan
