= Nishi-ojima Station =

Metro station in Tokyo, Japan

Coordinates: 35.689352°N 139.826219°E

Nishi-ojima Station 西大島駅

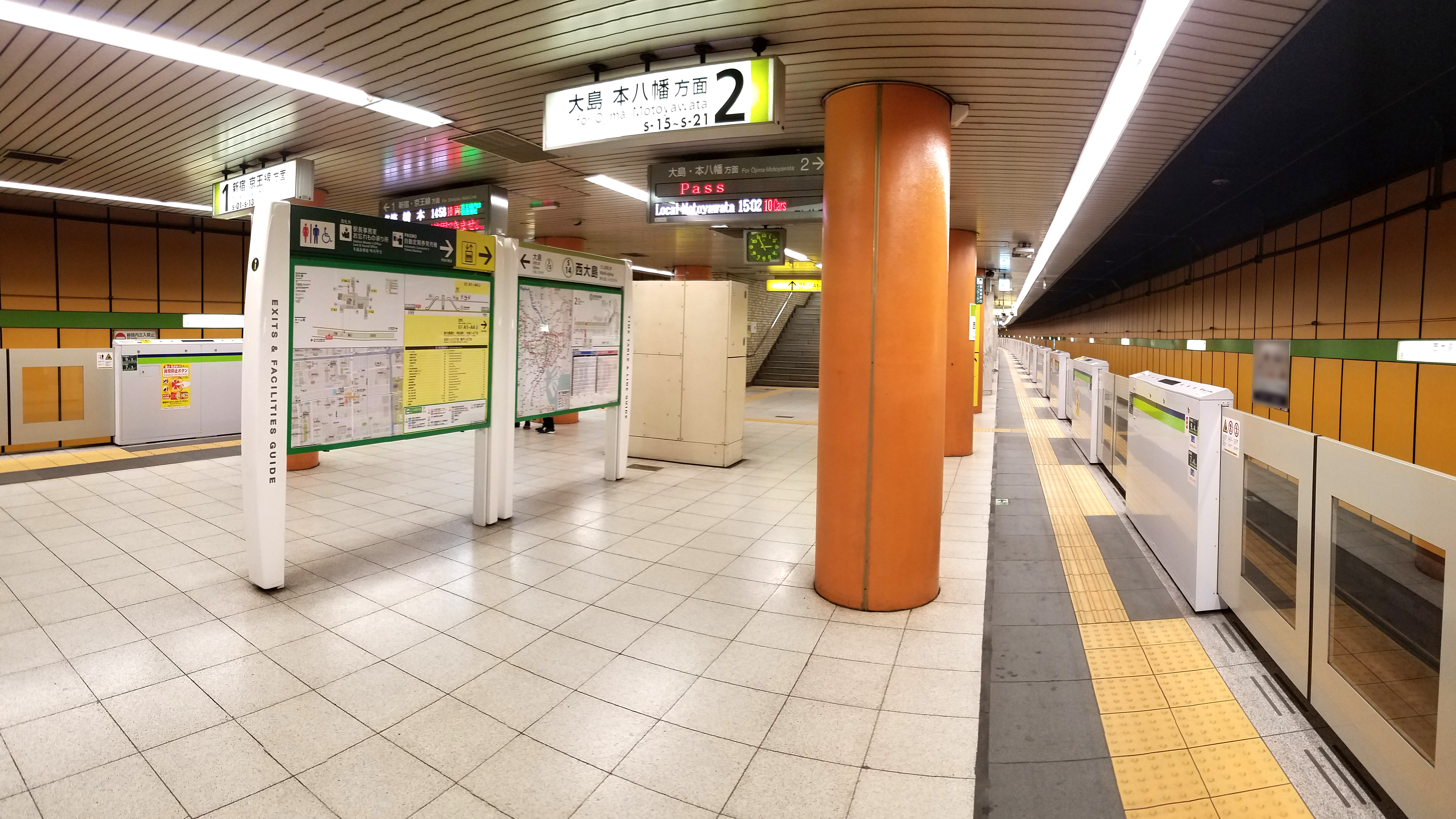
- The platforms

General information
- Location: 2-41-19 Ōjima, Kōtō City, Tokyo （東京都江東区大島2-41-19） Japan
- Operator: Toei Subway
- Line: Shinjuku Line
- Platforms: 1 island platform
- Tracks: 2
- Connections: Bus stop

Construction
- Structure type: Underground

Other information
- Station code: S-14

History
- Opened: 21 December 1978; 47 years ago

Passengers
- 23,329 daily

Services
| Preceding station | Toei Subway | Following station |
|---|---|---|
| Sumiyoshi towards Shinjuku | Shinjuku Line Local | Ojima towards Motoyawata |
Location
- Location within Special wards of Tokyo Location within Tokyo Bay and Bōsō Peninsula Location within Tokyo Location within Japan

Nishi-ojima Station (西大島駅, Nishi-ōjima-eki) is a railway station in Kōtō, Ojima, Tokyo, Japan. Its station number is S-14. The station opened on December 21, 1978.

== Platforms ==
Nishi-ojima Station consists of a single island platform served by two tracks.

| 1 | Shinjuku Line | for Bakuro-yokoyama and Shinjuku; Keio Line for Sasazuka and Hashimoto |
| 2 | Shinjuku Line | for Motoyawata |

== Surrounding area ==
The station is located underneath the intersection of Tokyo Metropolitan Routes 50 (Shin-Ōhashi-dōri) and 306 (Meiji-dōri). The area is a mix of mid-rise office buildings and scattered apartment buildings, with the Ōjima 4-chōme danchi owned by Urban Renaissance to the southeast. Other points of interest include:

- Tokyo Metropolitan High School of Science and Technology
- Kōtō Municipal No. 1 Ōjima Elementary School
- Jōtō Health Center
- Jōtō Post Office
- Tokyo Metropolitan Jōtō Senior High School
- Kōtō Municipal Comprehensive Sports Center
- Jōtō Police Station

== Connecting bus service ==
Toei Bus: Nishi-Ōjima-Ekimae

- To 07: for Monzen-Nakachō and Kinshichō stations
- Kin 18: for Shin-Kiba-Ekimae, Kinshichō Station
- Kyūkō 05: for National Museum of Emerging Science and Innovation, Kinshichō Station
- Ryō 28: for Kasaibashi, Rinkai garage, No. 6 Kasai Elementary School, Ryōgoku Station
- Kame 29: for Nishi-Kasai-Ekimae, Nagisa New Town
- Kame 23: for Minami-Sunamachi Station, Kōtō Geriatric Medical Center, Kameido Station
- Kin 28: for Higashi-Ōjima-Ekimae, Kinshichō Station
- Kusa 24: for Asakusa-Kotobukichō, Higashi-Ōjima-Ekimae via Ōjima Station
- Kame 24: for Kasaibashi; via Nishi-Ōjima Station for Kameido Station

== Line ==
- Tokyo Metropolitan Bureau of Transportation - Toei Shinjuku Line
