= Ochiai Station (Tokyo) =

Metro station in Tokyo, Japan

Coordinates: 35°42′39″N 139°41′11″E

Ochiai Station 落合駅

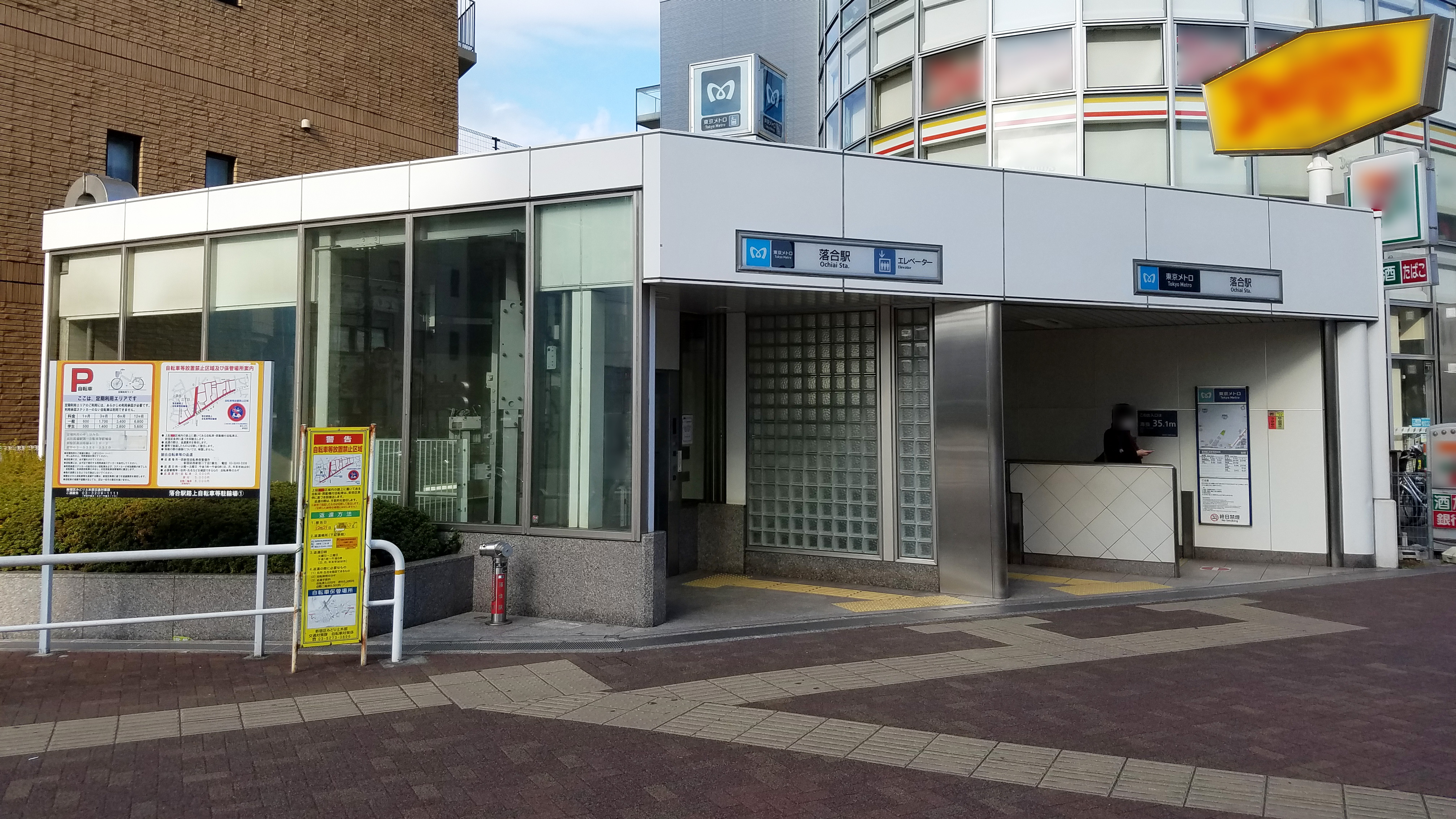
- Entrance 2A in January 2017

General information
- Location: 2-17-7 Kami-Ochiai, Shinjuku City, Tokyo; Japan
- Operator: Tokyo Metro
- Line: Tōzai Line
- Platforms: 1 island platform
- Tracks: 2

Construction
- Structure type: Underground

Other information
- Station code: T-02

History
- Opened: 16 March 1966; 60 years ago

Passengers
- FY2013: 24,035 daily

Services
Preceding station	Tokyo Metro	Following station
Nakano Terminus	Tōzai Line Rapid Commuter Rapid Local	Takadanobaba towards Nishi-Funabashi
Location
- Location within Tokyo Yamanote Loop Location within Tokyo wards area Location within Japan

Ochiai Station (落合駅, Ochiai-eki) is a subway station on the Tokyo Metro Tozai Line in Shinjuku, Tokyo, Japan, operated by the Tokyo subway operator Tokyo Metro. It is numbered T-02.

== Lines ==
Ochiai Station is served by the Tokyo Metro Tozai Line.

== Station layout ==
The station consists of an island platform serving two tracks.

=== Platforms ===
1	Tozai Line	for Ōtemachi, Tōyōchō, Nishi-Funabashi; Chuo-Sobu Line for Tsudanuma; Toyo Rapid Railway Line for Tōyō-Katsutadai
2	Tozai Line	for Nakano; Chuo-Sobu Line for Mitaka

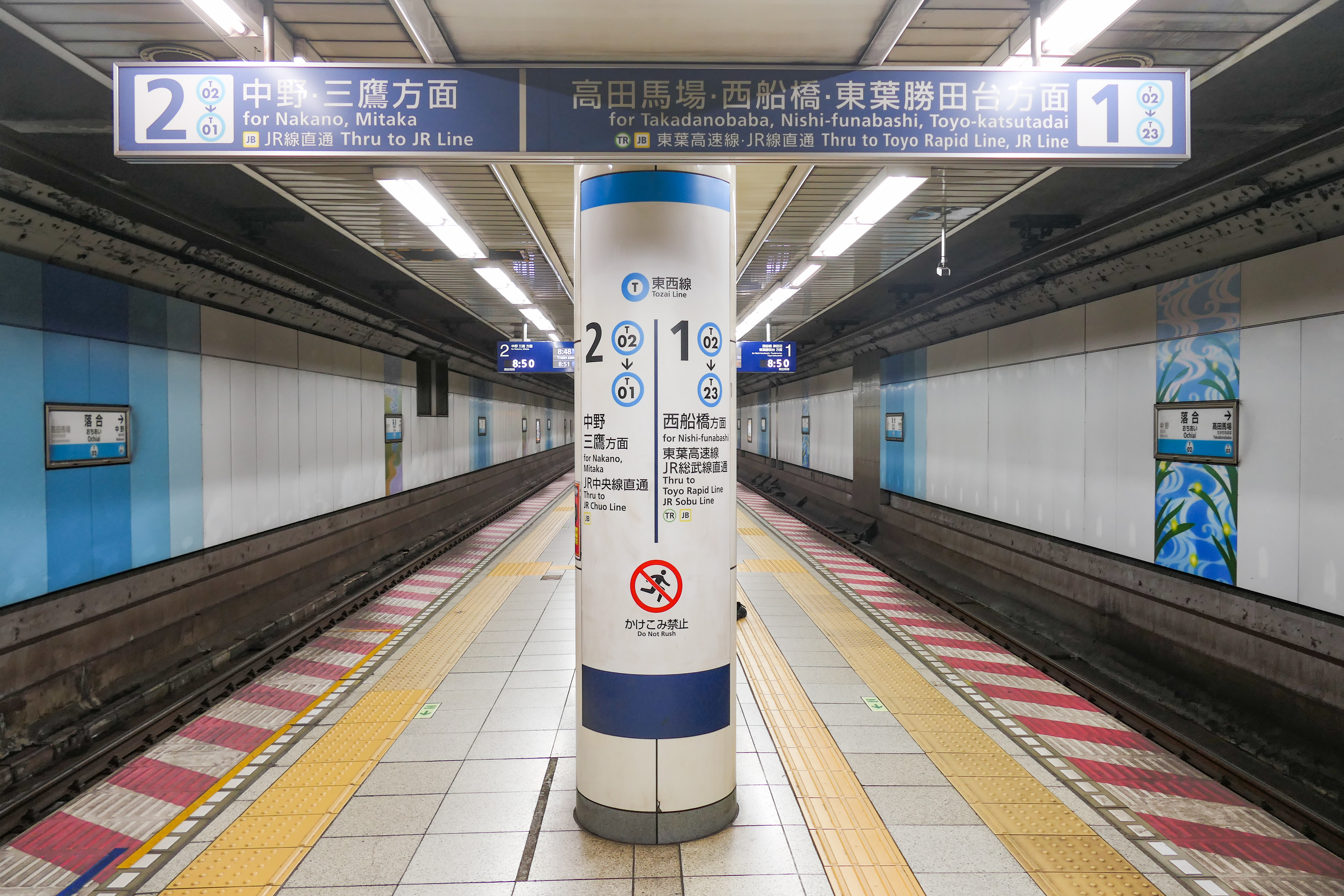
The platforms in December 2022

== History ==
The station opened on 16 March 1966.

The station facilities were inherited by Tokyo Metro after the privatization of the Teito Rapid Transit Authority (TRTA) in 2004.

== Passenger statistics ==
In fiscal 2013, the station was 116th busiest on the Tokyo Metro network with an average of 24,035 passengers daily. The passenger statistics for previous years are as shown below.

Fiscal year	Daily average
2011	22,366
2012	23,418
2013	24,035

== See also ==
- List of railway stations in Japan
