= Takebashi Station =

Metro station in Tokyo, Japan

Coordinates: 35.690707°N 139.756823°E

Takebashi Station 竹橋駅

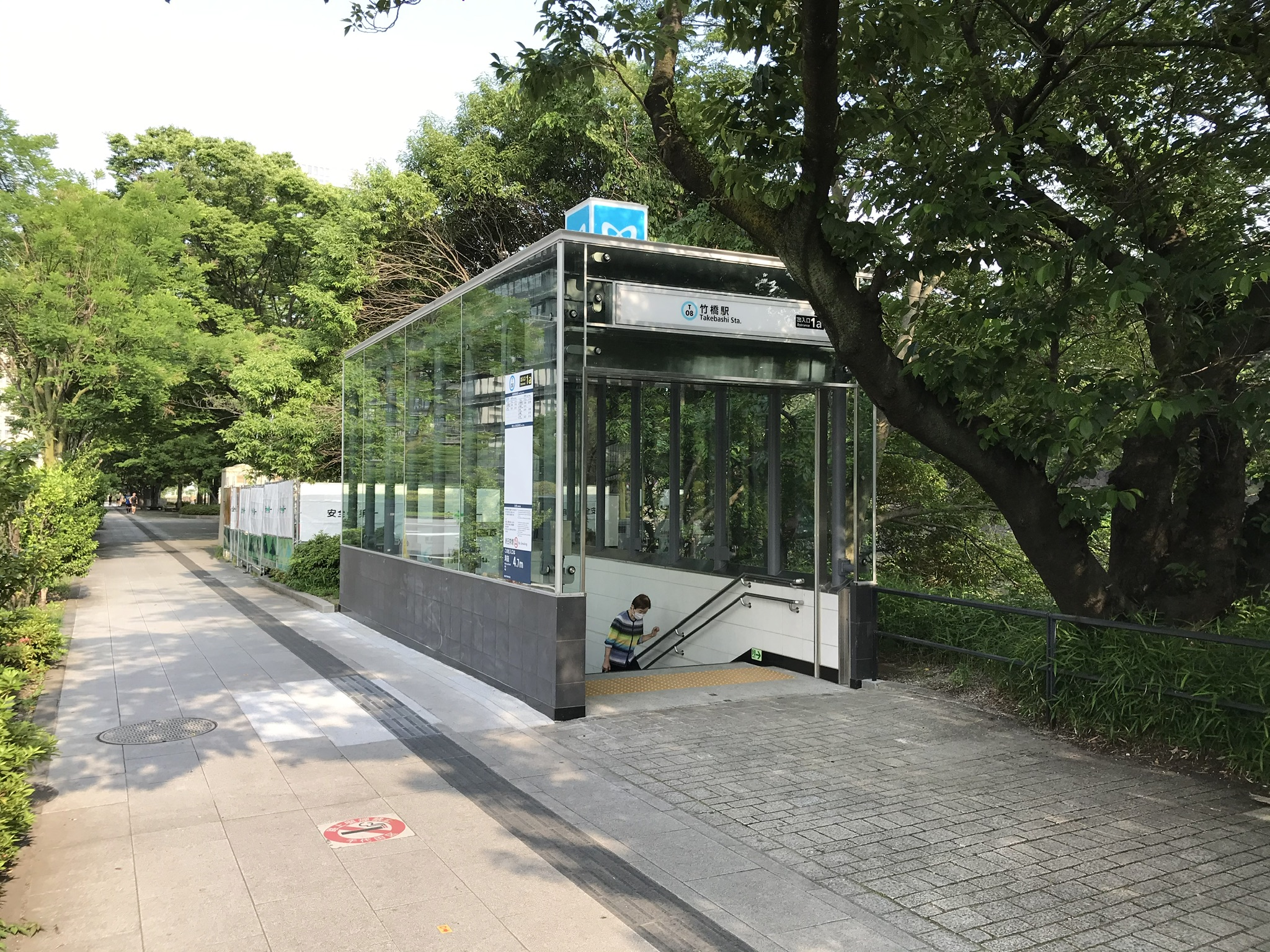
- Exit1a in June 2020

General information
- Location: 1-1-1 Hitotsubashi, Chiyoda, Tokyo; Japan
- Operator: Tokyo Metro
- Line: Tōzai Line
- Platforms: 2 side platforms
- Tracks: 2

Construction
- Structure type: Underground

Other information
- Station code: T-08

History
- Opened: 16 March 1966; 60 years ago

Services
Preceding station	Tokyo Metro	Following station
Kudanshita towards Nakano	Tōzai Line Rapid Commuter Rapid Local	Ōtemachi towards Nishi-Funabashi
Location
- Location within Tokyo Yamanote Loop Location within Tokyo wards area Location within Japan

Takebashi Station (竹橋駅, Takebashi-eki) is a station on the Tokyo Metro Tozai Line in Chiyoda, Tokyo, Japan. Its station designation is T-08. It is located directly underneath the headquarters of the Mainichi Shimbun in the Palaceside Building and is directly adjacent to the northern edge of the Imperial Palace grounds. The station is also convenient to such attractions as the National Museum of Modern Art, Tokyo (3 minute walk), and the Japan Science Foundation's Science Museum (7 minute walk).

== Lines ==
- Tokyo Metro Tozai Line

== Station layout ==
The station consists of two side platforms serving two tracks.

=== Platform ===
1	Tozai Line	for Ōtemachi, Tōyōchō, and Nishi-Funabashi; Chuo-Sobu Line for Tsudanuma; Toyo Rapid Railway Line for Tōyō-Katsutadai
2	Tozai Line	for Takadanobaba and Nakano; Chuo-Sobu Line for Mitaka

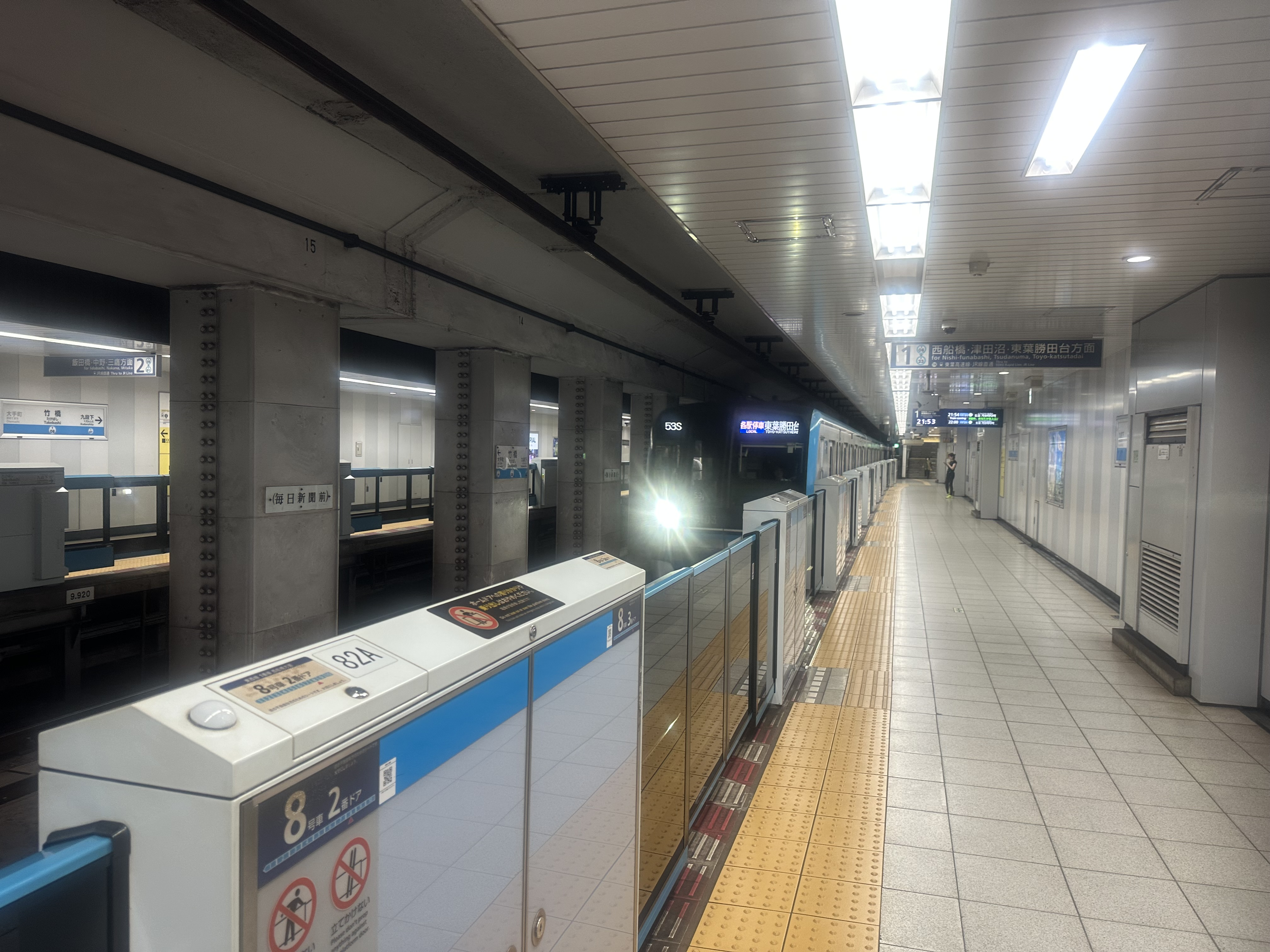
Station platforms

== History ==
Takebashi Station was opened on 16 March 1966 by the Teito Rapid Transit Authority (TRTA).

The station facilities were inherited by Tokyo Metro after the privatization of the Teito Rapid Transit Authority (TRTA) in 2004.
