= Waseda Station (Tokyo Metro) =

Metro station in Tokyo, Japan

Coordinates: 35°42′21″N 139°43′20″E

Waseda Station 早稲田駅

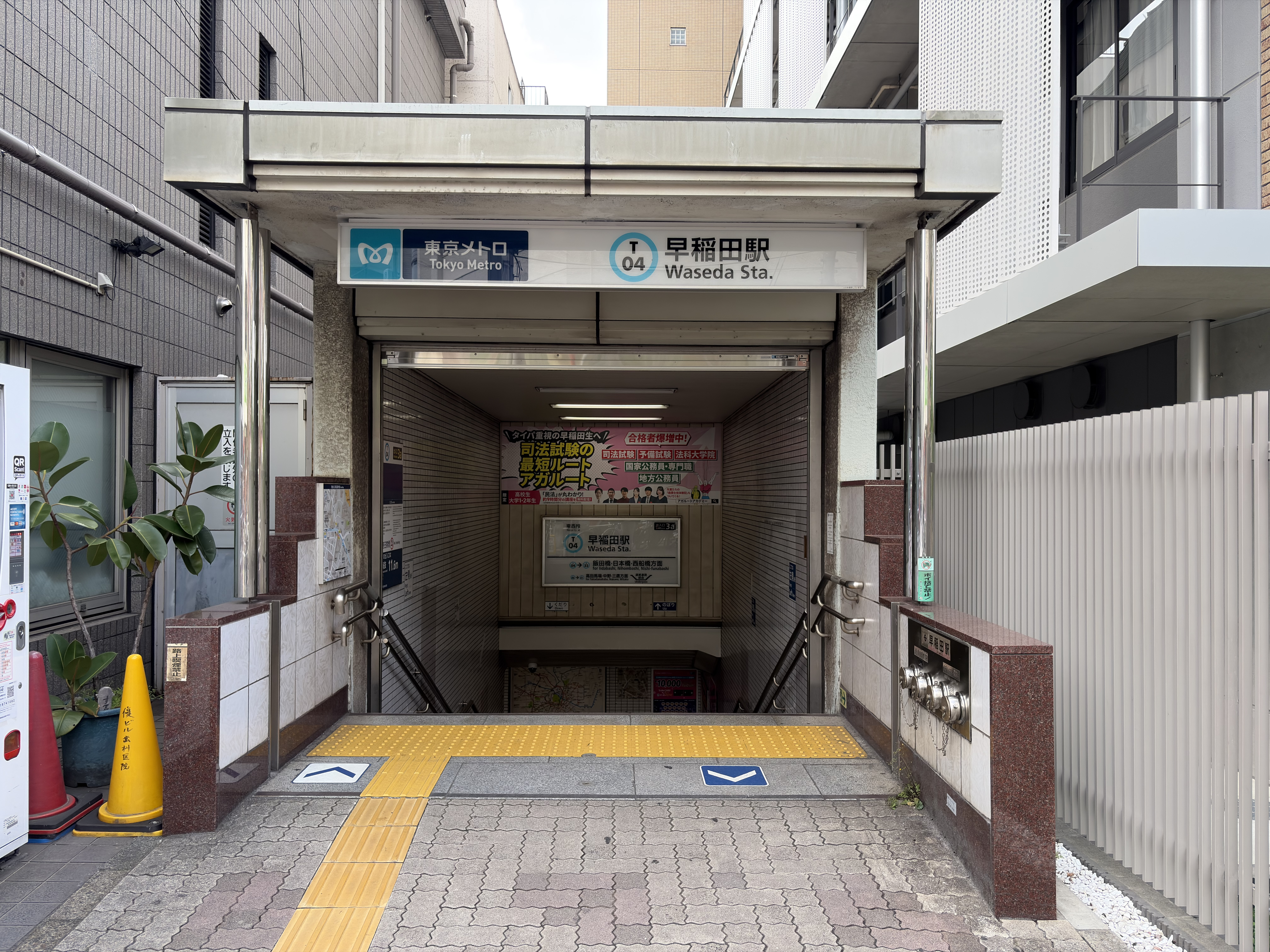
- Entrance 3A in April 2026

Japanese name
- Shinjitai: 早稲田駅
- Kyūjitai: 早稻田驛
- Hiragana: わせだえき

General information
- Location: 12 Waseda-Minamichō, Shinjuku City, Tokyo; Japan
- Operator: Tokyo Metro
- Line: Tōzai Line
- Platforms: 2 side platforms
- Tracks: 2

Construction
- Structure type: Underground

Other information
- Station code: T-04

History
- Opened: 23 December 1964; 61 years ago

Services
Preceding station	Tokyo Metro	Following station
Takadanobaba towards Nakano	Tōzai Line Rapid Commuter Rapid Local	Kagurazaka towards Nishi-Funabashi
Location
- Location within Tokyo Yamanote Loop Location within Tokyo wards area Location within Japan

Waseda Station (早稲田駅, Waseda-eki) is a subway station on the Tokyo Metro Tozai Line in Shinjuku, Tokyo, Japan, operated by Tokyo Metro. Its station number is T-04. It is separate from Waseda Station on the Tokyo Sakura Tram.

== Lines ==
Waseda Station is served by the Tokyo Metro Tōzai Line.

== Platforms ==
1	Tozai Line	for Ōtemachi, Tōyōchō, Nishi-Funabashi; Chuo-Sobu Line for Tsudanuma; Toyo Rapid Railway Line for Tōyō-Katsutadai
2	Tozai Line	for Nakano; Chuo-Sobu Line for Mitaka

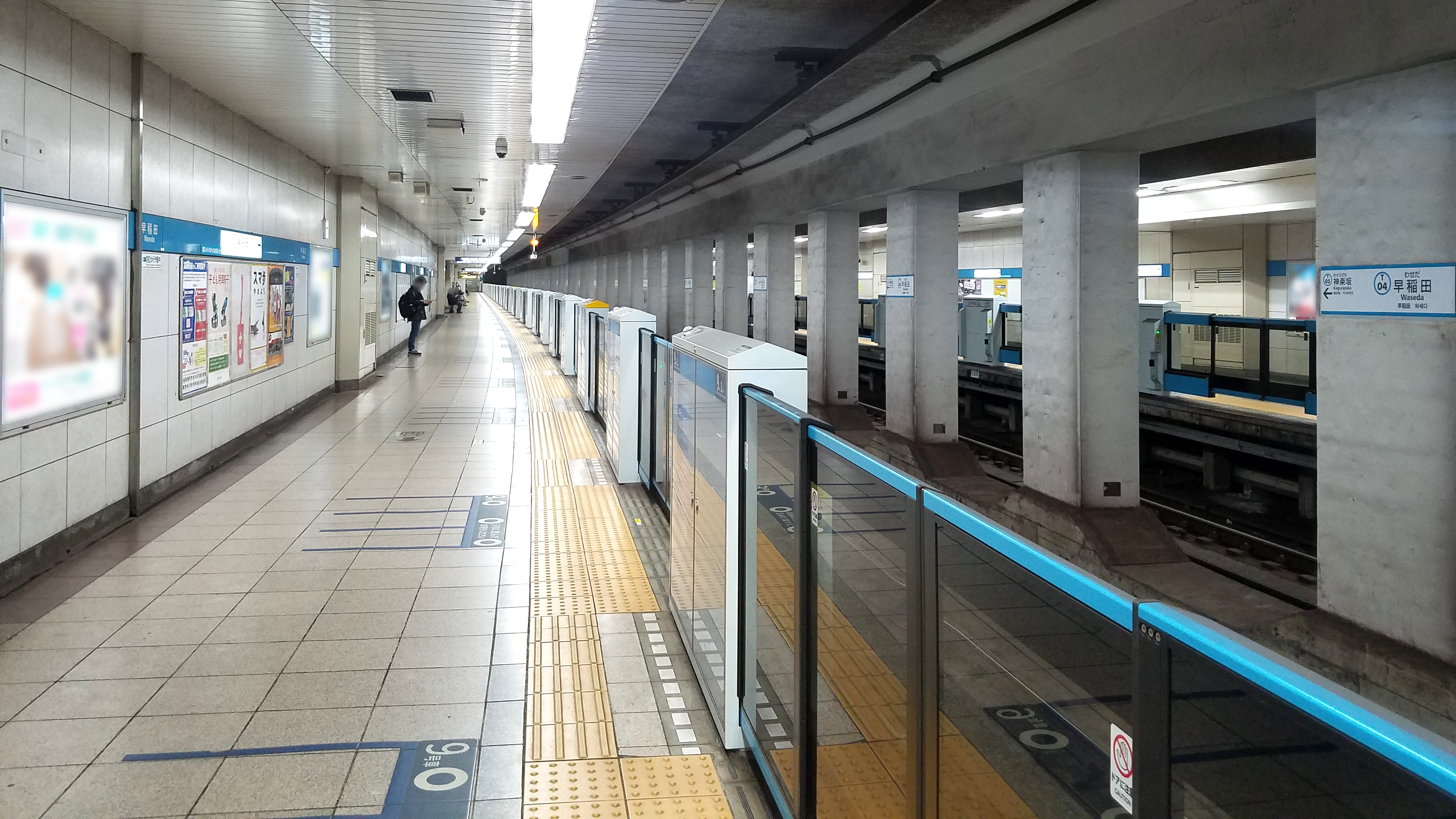
Platforms

A train arriving at the Station in 2015

== History ==
Teito Rapid Transit Authority (TRTA) opened the station on 23 December 1964.

The station facilities were inherited by Tokyo Metro after the privatization of the Teito Rapid Transit Authority (TRTA) in 2004.

== Surrounding area ==
- Totsukamachi area
- Toyama area
- Kikuicho area
- Waseda University Junior and Senior High School
- Waseda University - Waseda and Kikuicho Campuses
