= Nishi-Kasai Station =

Metro station in Tokyo, Japan

Coordinates: 35.664525°N 139.859366°E

Nishi-kasai Station 西葛西駅

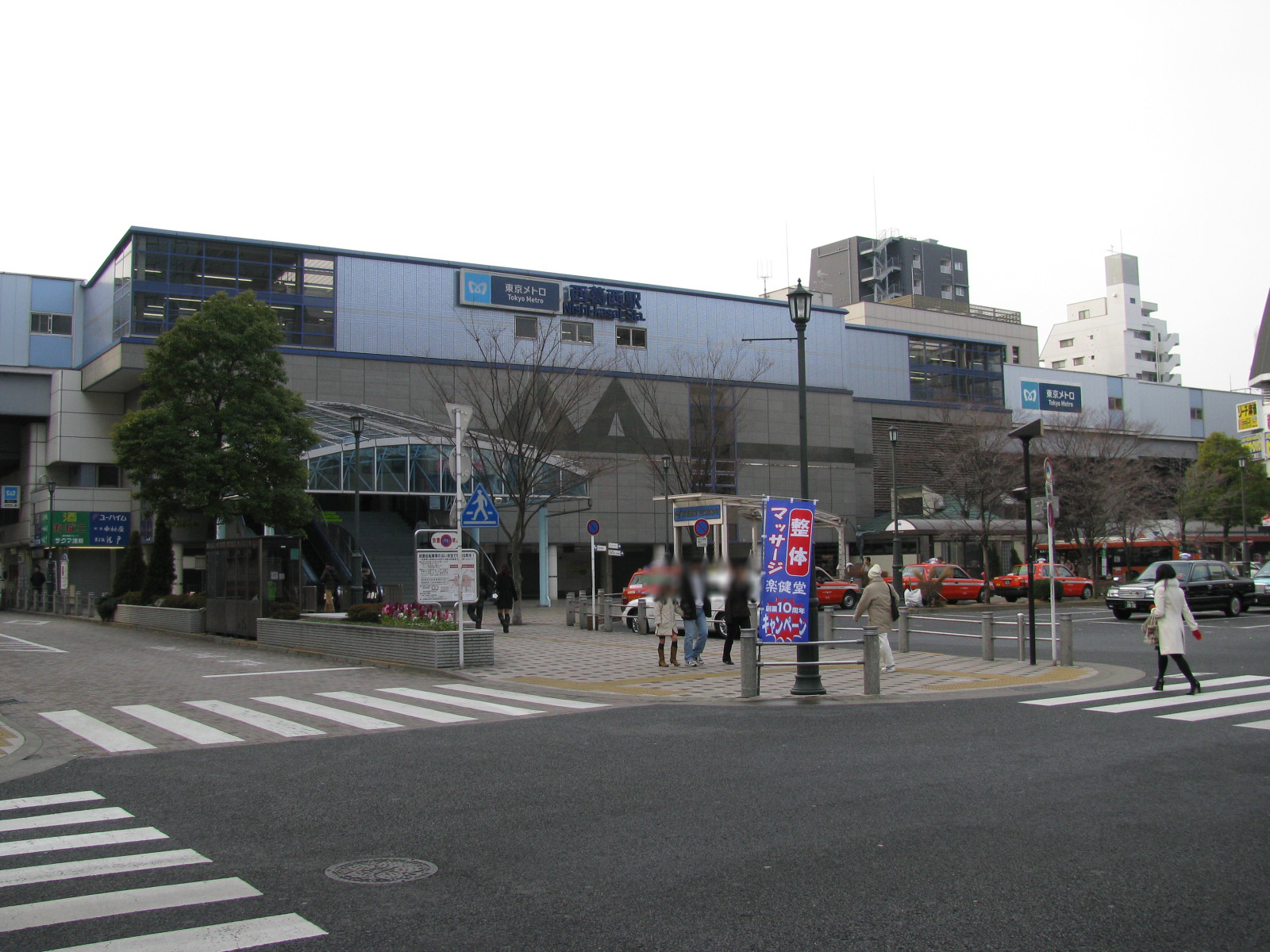
- Nishi-kasai Station in February 2008

General information
- Location: 6-14-1 Nishi-Kasai, Edogawa-ku, Tokyo; Japan
- Operator: Tokyo Metro
- Line: Tōzai Line
- Platforms: 2 side platforms
- Tracks: 2

Construction
- Structure type: Elevated

Other information
- Station code: T-16

History
- Opened: 1 October 1979; 46 years ago

Services
Preceding station	Tokyo Metro	Following station
Minami-sunamachi towards Nakano	Tōzai Line Commuter Rapid Local	Kasai towards Nishi-Funabashi
Location
- Location within Tokyo wards area Location within Tokyo Keiyo area Location within Kanto Area Location within Japan

Nishi-kasai Station (西葛西駅, Nishi-kasai-eki) is a railway station on the Tokyo Metro Tozai Line in Edogawa, Tokyo, Japan, operated by the Tokyo subway operator Tokyo Metro. Its station number is T-16.

== Lines ==
Nishi-Kasai Station is served by the Tokyo Metro Tozai Line.

== Station layout ==
The station has two elevated side platforms.

=== Platforms ===
1	Tōzai Line	for Nishi-Funabashi; Chuo-Sobu Line for Tsudanuma; Toyo Rapid Railway Line for Tōyō-Katsutadai
2	Tōzai Line	for Tōyōchō, Ōtemachi, and Nakano; Chuo-Sobu Line for Mitaka

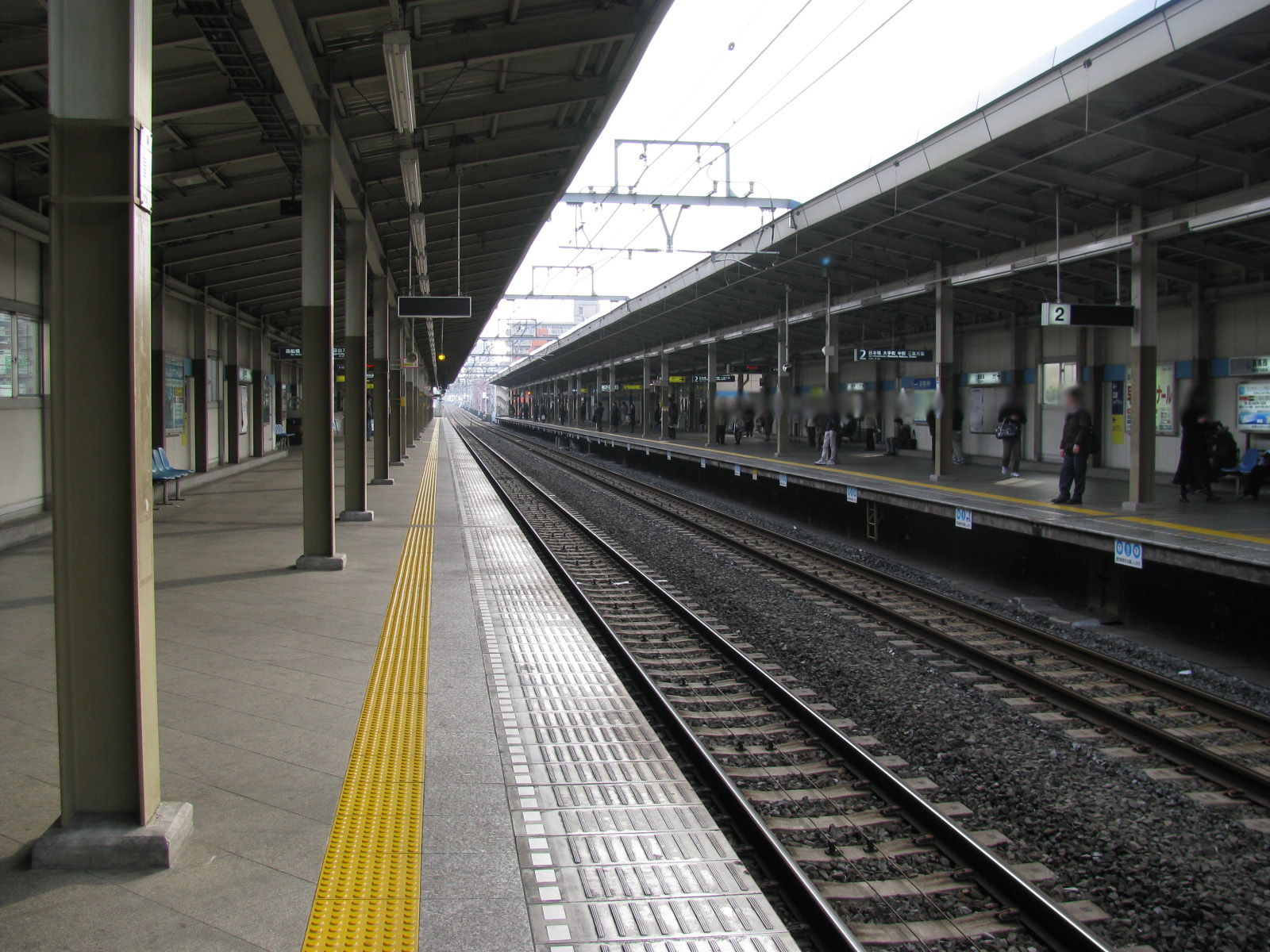
Elevated platforms, 2008

== History ==
Nishi-kasai Station opened on 1 October 1979.

The station facilities were inherited by Tokyo Metro after the privatization of the Teito Rapid Transit Authority (TRTA) in 2004.

== Surrounding area ==
- Edogawa Ward Natural Zoo
- Shinsakongawa Water Park
- Edogawa Stadium
