= Tōzai Line (Tokyo Metro) =

Subway line in Japan

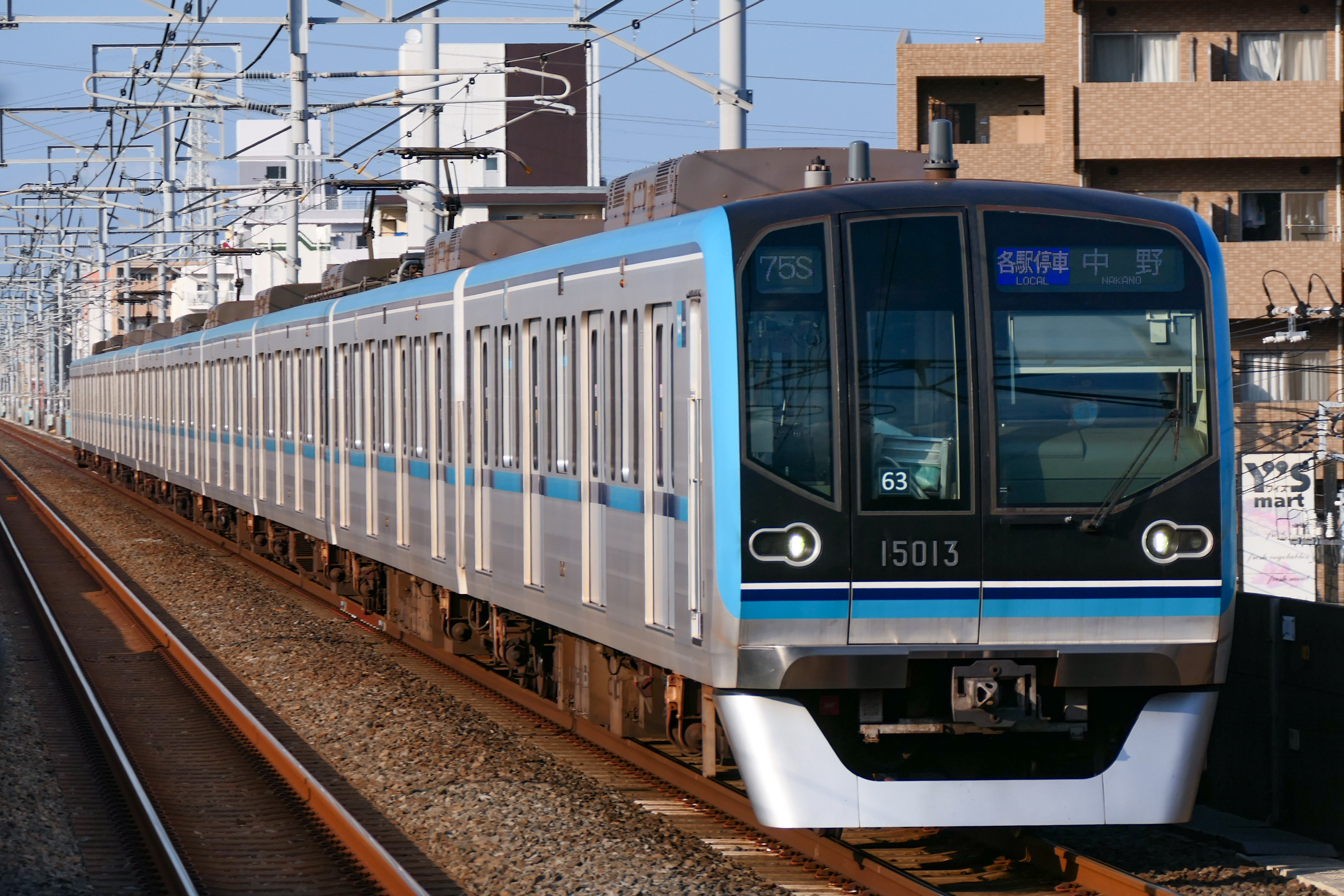
- A Tōzai Line 15000 series train

Overview
- Other name: Line 5
- Native name: 東西線
- Status: In service
- Owner: Tokyo Metro Co., Ltd.
- Line number: T
- Locale: Tokyo, Chiba prefectures
- Termini: Nakano; Nishi-Funabashi
- Stations: 23
- Color on map: Sky blue

Service
- System: Tokyo subway (Tokyo Metro)
- Operator(s): Tokyo Metro Co., Ltd.
- Depot(s): Fukagawa, Gyōtoku
- Rolling stock: Tokyo Metro 05/05N series Tokyo Metro 07 series Tokyo Metro 15000 series Tōyō Rapid 2000 series JR East E231-800 series
- Daily ridership: 1,499,589 (2024)

History
- Opened: 23 December 1964; 61 years ago
- Last extension: 1969

Technical
- Line length: 30.8 km (19.1 mi)
- Number of tracks: 2
- Track gauge: 1,067 mm (3 ft 6 in)
- Minimum radius: 200 m (660 ft)
- Electrification: Overhead line, 1,500 V DC
- Operating speed: 100 km/h (62 mph)
- Train protection system: New CS-ATC
- Maximum incline: 4.0%

Tokyo Metro Tōzai Line train pulling into Waseda Station in 2015

The Tōzai Line (東西線, Tōzai-sen; lit. 'East-West Line') is a rapid transit line in Tokyo and Chiba Prefecture, Japan, owned and operated by Tokyo Metro. The line runs between Nakano in Nakano-ku, Tokyo and Nishi-Funabashi in Funabashi, Chiba Prefecture.

The Tōzai Line was referred to as Line 5 during the planning stages; the seldom-used official name is Line 5 Tōzai Line (5号線東西線, Go-gō-sen Tōzai-sen).

In 2024, the line carried a daily average of nearly 1.5 million passengers, making it the busiest line on the Tokyo subway network. On maps, diagrams and signboards, the Tōzai Line is shown using the color "sky blue" and its stations are given numbers using the letter "T".

== Overview ==
The line runs through central Tokyo from east to west via Takadanobaba, Waseda, Ōtemachi, Nihombashi, Kiba and Urayasu. It was opened as a bypass route for the Chuo Rapid Line and the Sobu Line, which were heavily congested at the time. It is one of only two Tokyo Metro lines to extend into Chiba Prefecture (alongside the Shinjuku Line operated by Toei.) It also runs above-ground for 14 km (8.7 mi) from Minami-Sunamachi to Nishi-Funabashi, nearly half of the line and longer than any other railway line in the Tokyo subway network.

The Tōzai Line features through services at both ends of the line. Trains run onto the JR East Chūō-Sōbu Line for Mitaka at the western (Nakano) end, and onto either the Chūō-Sōbu Line for Tsudanuma or the Tōyō Rapid Railway Line for Tōyō-Katsutadai at the eastern (Nishi-Funabashi) end.

According to the Tokyo Metropolitan Bureau of Transportation in 2018, the Tokyo Metro Tōzai Line continues to be most crowded subway line in Tokyo, and the most crowded train line in all of Japan, with its peak running at 199% capacity^{[a]} between Kiba and Monzen-Nakachō stations. Women-only cars were introduced on the line for use during morning rush hour on November 20, 2006.

During the COVID-19 pandemic, peak ridership dropped from a rate of 199% in 2019 to 123% in 2020.

== History ==
=== Early years ===
The original plan for what is now the Tōzai Line was included in a report by the Tokyo City and Area Transportation Research Committee (東京市内外交通調査委員会), which was established within the Ministry of Home Affairs in 1917. The proposal outlined a route connecting “Ikebukuro – Takadanobaba – Iidabashi – Otemachi – Susaki”.

In 1920, a construction patent for this route was granted to the Tokyo Railway (東京鉄道). However, following the Great Kantō Earthquake of 1923, the patent was revoked along with those for other planned lines because construction had not yet commenced.

The route license for the Tōzai Line originates from the six municipal subway lines planned by Tokyo City, the predecessor of today’s Tokyo special wards, prior to World War II. The license was granted on May 16, 1925, under Ministry of Home Affairs Notification No. 56 of 1925 (大正14年内務省告示第56号).

The present Tōzai Line corresponds to the former Line 5, which was authorized as a 14.2-kilometer route running from “Ikebukuro – Waseda – Iidamachi – Hitotsubashi – Tokyo – Eitaibashi – Susaki”. As part of the initial phase of the Tokyo Municipal Subway project, Tokyo City planned to begin construction on Line 3 between Shibuya and Sugamo and on Line 5 between Ikebukuro and Susaki. However, due to the city’s substantial public debt and concerns over deteriorating finances, the Ministry of Home Affairs and the Ministry of Finance opposed the project, and construction approval was not granted.

Following this setback, no further construction plans were pursued, and the Teito Rapid Transit Authority, commonly known as the Eidan Subway, was subsequently established. In 1941, all subway route licenses held by the Tokyo municipal government were transferred to the Teito Rapid Transit Authority in exchange for compensation.

By contrast, the section corresponding to the present-day Tōyōchō to Nishi-Funabashi segment was originally licensed to the Tokyo Narishiba Electric Railway (東京成芝電気鉄道) prior to World War II. The application was approved in 1927, with the eastern terminus Tōyōchō designated as Higashi-hirai. However, this license ultimately expired in 1940 after construction failed to proceed.

=== Post-war construction ===
The Tōzai Line was planned by a review committee of the then Ministry of Transportation in 1962 and numbered Line 5. Its name literally means "East-West Line", and it was primarily planned to relieve traffic on the busy Sōbu Main Line as well as provide a straight crosstown connection through north-central Tokyo. Although this corridor is also served by the Tokyo Metropolitan Bureau of Transportation (Toei) Shinjuku Line and JR Keiyō Line, the Tōzai Line continues to operate beyond capacity due to its accessibility to other lines, as well as to growing condominium developments in eastern Tokyo.

The Takadanobaba to Kudanshita section opened in 1964, and the remainder opened in stages until its completion in 1969. Through service with the then Japanese National Railways (today part of the JR Group) – a first for a Tokyo subway line – began in 1969 connecting the Chūō and Sōbu lines. This is a rare situation in Tokyo, as the only other subway line with through services onto JR lines is the Chiyoda Line.

Due to a surge in ridership on the Tōzai Line, the Teito Rapid Transit Authority (TRTA) introduced 12 new-build 5000 series cars and transferred 50 from the Chiyoda Line in 1981 in an effort to increase capacity on the line. Rapid residential development in the Urayasu and Kasai areas further increased demand. In response, TRTA introduced rapid trains that ran non-stop between Nishi-Funabashi and Toyocho stations, and stopped at every station west of Urayasu, in November 1986.

The Tōyō Rapid Railway Line, effectively an eastward extension of the line, opened in 1996. It nevertheless remains a private entity to which the Tōzai lines offers through services.

=== Chronology ===
- March 30,1925: The Ministry of Home Affairs revised the Tokyo City Urban Planning High-Speed Transportation Network. Under the revision, Urban Planning Route No. 5 was officially designated as the line running between Ikebukuro Station and Susaki.
- May 6, 1925: The Tokyo City Government, based on the aforementioned official notification, applied for railway construction licenses for Urban Planning Route No. 5 and other planned routes. The licenses were granted on May 16.
- September 1, 1941: The Teito Rapid Transit Authority (TRTA, Eidan Subway) was established. The railway license for Urban Planning Route No. 5, which had been held by the Tokyo City Government, was transferred to the TRTA.
- December 7, 1946: The War Damage Reconstruction Agency revised the urban transportation plan, and Urban Planning Route No. 5 was officially designated as the line running between Nakano Station and Tōyōchō.
- August 2, 1960: The Teito Rapid Transit Authority (TRTA) formally announced the construction of Urban Planning Route No. 5 (the Tōzai Line).
- March 16, 1966: The line is extended at both ends. It now runs between Nakano and Takebashi.
- April 28, 1966: Through service to the Chūō Line of JNR commences as far as Ogikubo.
- October 1, 1966: Takebashi to Ōtemachi section opens.
- September 14, 1967: Ōtemachi to Tōyōchō section opens.
- March 29, 1969: Tōyōchō to Nishi-Funabashi section opens and Rapid service begins (non-stop between Tōyōchō and Nishi-Funabashi).
- April 8, 1969: Through service on the Chūō Line is extended to Mitaka, and through service begins on the Sōbu line to Tsudanuma.
- April 8, 1972: Through service on the Sōbu Line is withdrawn except during rush hours.
- 1975: Another type of Rapid service is introduced, calling at Urayasu between Tōyōchō and Nishi-Funabashi.
- October 1, 1979: Nishi-Kasai station opens.
- March 27, 1981: Minami-Gyōtoku station opens.
- 1986: Commuter Rapid service is introduced, running non-stop between Urayasu and Nishi-Funabashi.
- (April 1, 1987: JNR is privatised. The Chūō and Sōbu lines become the property of JR East.)
- 1996: The Rapid service that runs non-stop between Tōyōchō and Nishi-Funabashi ceases.
- April 27, 1996: Tōyō Rapid Line opens between Nishi-Funabashi and Tōyō-Katsutadai. Through service begins.
- January 22, 2000: Myōden station opens.
- April 1, 2004: Teito Rapid Transit Authority (TRTA or Eidan) becomes Tokyo Metro.
- November 20, 2006: Women-only cars are introduced during morning rush hours.

== Services ==
The Tōzai Line was the first Tokyo Metro line on which express services run: two types of rapid trains skip some stations east of Toyocho. The Tokyo Metro Fukutoshin Line began services on June 14, 2008, and also features express services.

Through services to Mitaka via the JR East Chūō Line and Tōyō-Katsutadai via the Tōyō Rapid Railway run all day. Outside of rush hours, only local trains run through to the Chūō Line and only rapid trains run through to the Tōyō Rapid Railway. During the morning and evening peak periods, through services run to Tsudanuma via the JR East Sōbu Line.

== Stations ==
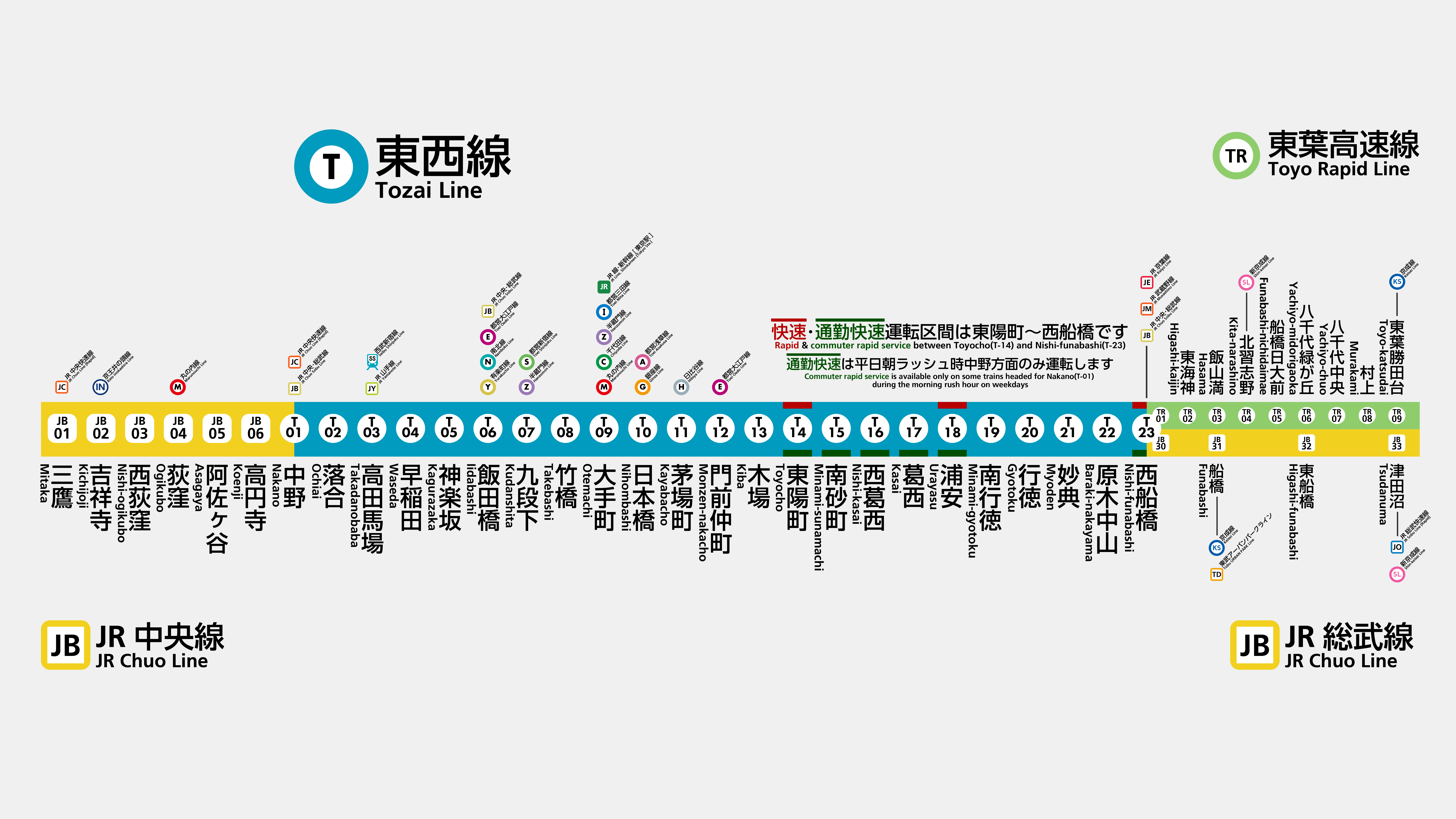
List of Tozai line stations

- Local trains stop at every station. Rapid trains stop at stations marked "●" and do not stop at those marked "｜". Some weekday westbound trains do not stop at stations marked "↑".

No.	Station	Japanese	Distance (km)		Comm. Rapid	Rapid	Transfers	Location	
No.	Station	Japanese	Between stations	From Nakano	Comm. Rapid	Rapid	Transfers	Location	
↑ Through-services to/from Mitaka via Chūō–Sōbu Line ↑
T-01	Nakano	中野 (Note: Nakano is shared by Tokyo Metro and JR East; JR East manages the station.)	–	0.0	●	●	Chūō–Sōbu Line (JB07); Chūō Line (JC06)	Nakano	Tokyo
T-02	Ochiai	落合	2.0	2.0	●	●		Shinjuku	Tokyo
T-03	Takadanobaba	高田馬場	1.9	3.9	●	●	Fukutoshin Line (Nishi-waseda: F-11) (Note: Both Tokyo Metro stations are displayed on station maps as being distant from one another, and they are not announced as transfer points for one another.); Yamanote Line (JY15); Shinjuku Line (SS02)	Shinjuku	Tokyo
T-04	Waseda	早稲田	1.7	5.6	●	●	Toden Arakawa Line (Waseda: SA30) (Note: Both the Tokyo Metro and Toei stations are displayed on station maps as being distant from one another, and they are not announced as transfer points for one another.)	Shinjuku	Tokyo
T-05	Kagurazaka	神楽坂	1.2	6.8	●	●		Shinjuku	Tokyo
T-06	Iidabashi	飯田橋	1.2	8.0	●	●	Namboku Line (N-10); Yūrakuchō Line (Y-13); Ōedo Line (E-06); Chūō–Sōbu Line (JB16)	Chiyoda	Tokyo
T-07	Kudanshita	九段下	0.7	8.7	●	●	Hanzōmon Line (Z-06); Shinjuku Line (S-05)	Chiyoda	Tokyo
T-08	Takebashi	竹橋	1.0	9.7	●	●		Chiyoda	Tokyo
T-09	Ōtemachi	大手町	1.0	10.7	●	●	Marunouchi Line (M-18); Chiyoda Line (C-11); Hanzōmon Line (Z-08); Mita Line (I-09)	Chiyoda	Tokyo
T-10	Nihombashi	日本橋	0.8	11.5	●	●	Ginza Line (G-11); Asakusa Line (A-13)	Chūō	Tokyo
T-11	Kayabachō	茅場町	0.5	12.0	●	●	Hibiya Line (H-13)	Chūō	Tokyo
T-12	Monzen-Nakachō	門前仲町	1.8	13.8	●	●	Ōedo Line (E-15)	Kōtō	Tokyo
T-13	Kiba	木場	1.1	14.9	●	●		Kōtō	Tokyo
T-14	Tōyōchō	東陽町	0.9	15.8	●	●		Kōtō	Tokyo
T-15	Minami-Sunamachi	南砂町	1.2	17.0	●	|		Kōtō	Tokyo
T-16	Nishi-Kasai	西葛西	2.7	19.7	●	|		Edogawa	Tokyo
T-17	Kasai	葛西	1.2	20.9	●	|		Edogawa	Tokyo
T-18	Urayasu	浦安	1.9	22.8	●	●		Urayasu	Chiba
T-19	Minami-Gyōtoku	南行徳	1.2	24.0	↑	|		Ichikawa	Chiba
T-20	Gyōtoku	行徳	1.5	25.5	↑	|		Ichikawa	Chiba
T-21	Myōden	妙典	1.3	26.8	↑	|		Ichikawa	Chiba
T-22	Baraki-Nakayama	原木中山	2.1	28.9	↑	|		Funabashi	Chiba
T-23	Nishi-Funabashi	西船橋 (Note: Nishi-Funabashi is shared by Tokyo Metro, Tōyō Rapid Railway, and JR East; JR East and Tokyo Metro manage the station.)	1.9	30.8	●	●	Tōyō Rapid Railway Line (TR01); Chūō–Sōbu Line (JB30); Musashino Line (JM10); Keiyō Line (JM10)	Funabashi	Chiba
↓ Through-services to/from: ↓: Yachiyo-Midorigaoka, Tōyō-Katsutadai via Tōyō Rapid Railway Line; Limited through-services to/from Tsudanuma via Chūō–Sōbu Line

== Rolling stock ==
=== Present ===
Tōzai Line trains are 10-car formations of 20-meter (65 ft 7 in)-long cars, with four doors per side and longitudinal seating. The maximum operating speed is 100 km/h (62 mph). Newer trains feature wide doors to allow for faster boarding times.

- Tokyo Metro
  - 05/05N series (since 1988)
  - 07 series (since 2006) (transferred from Yūrakuchō Line)
  - 15000 series (since 2010)
- Tōyō Rapid Railway
  - 2000 series (since 2004)
- East Japan Railway Company (JR East)
  - E231-800 series (since 2003)
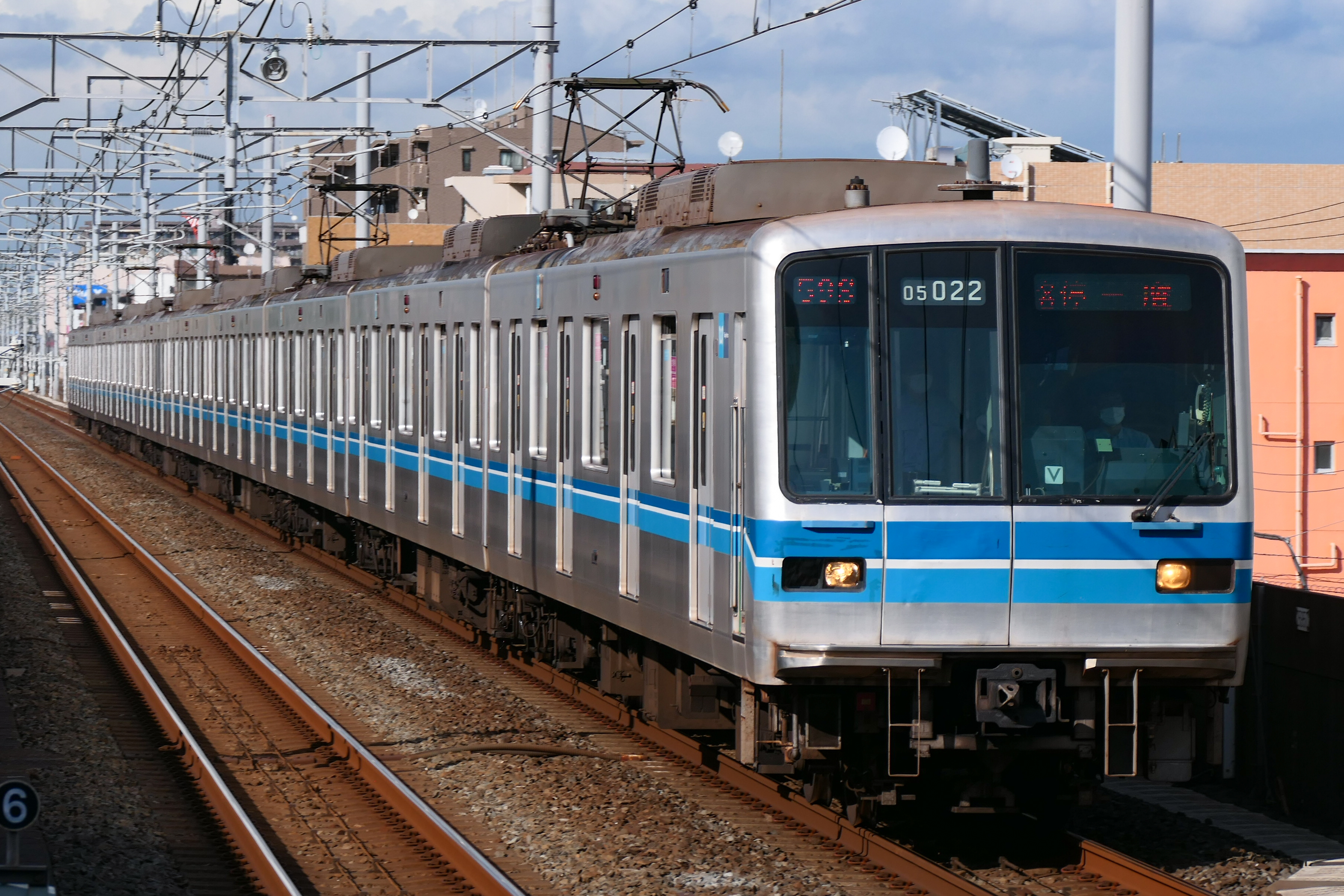
Tokyo Metro 05 series

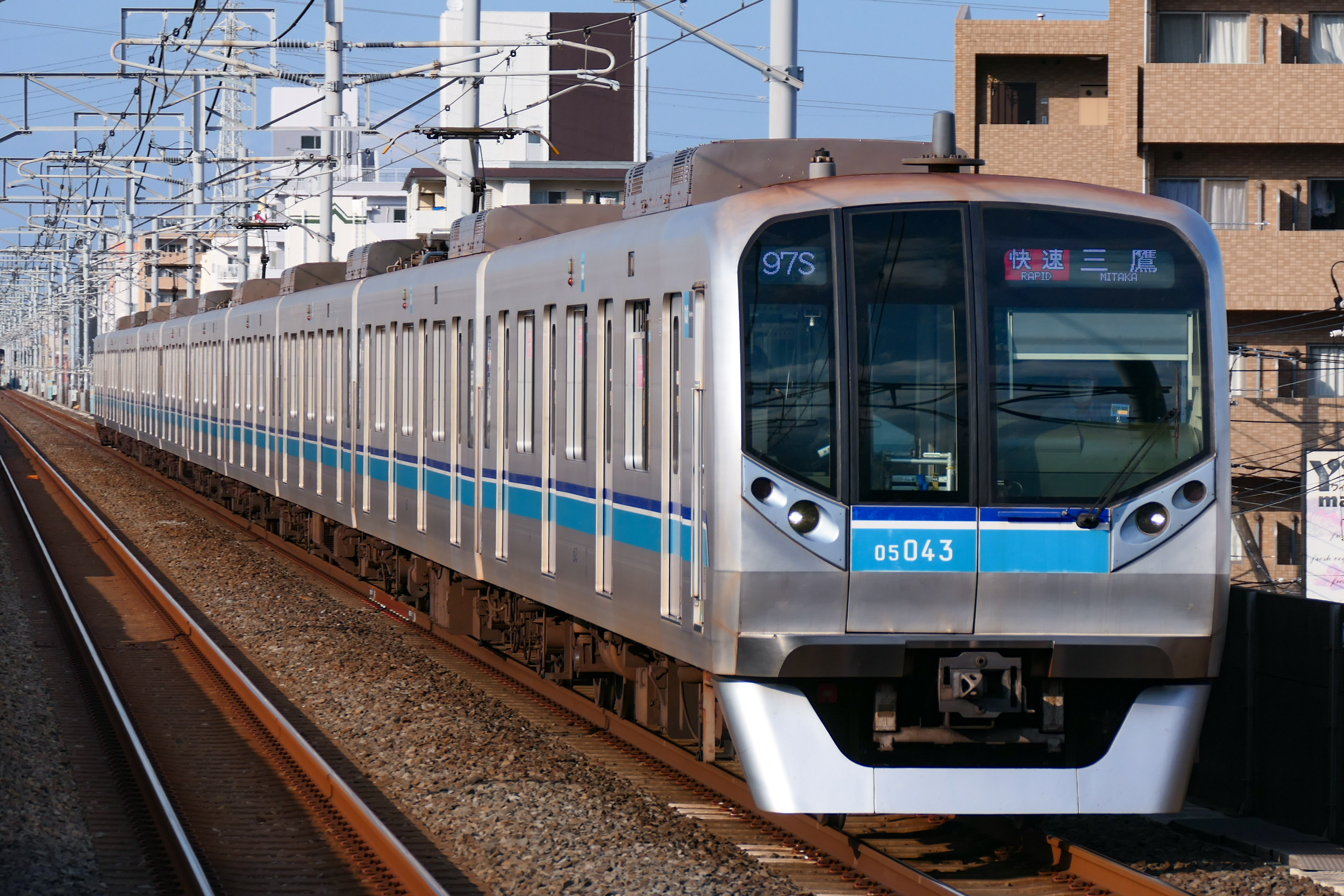
Tokyo Metro 05N series

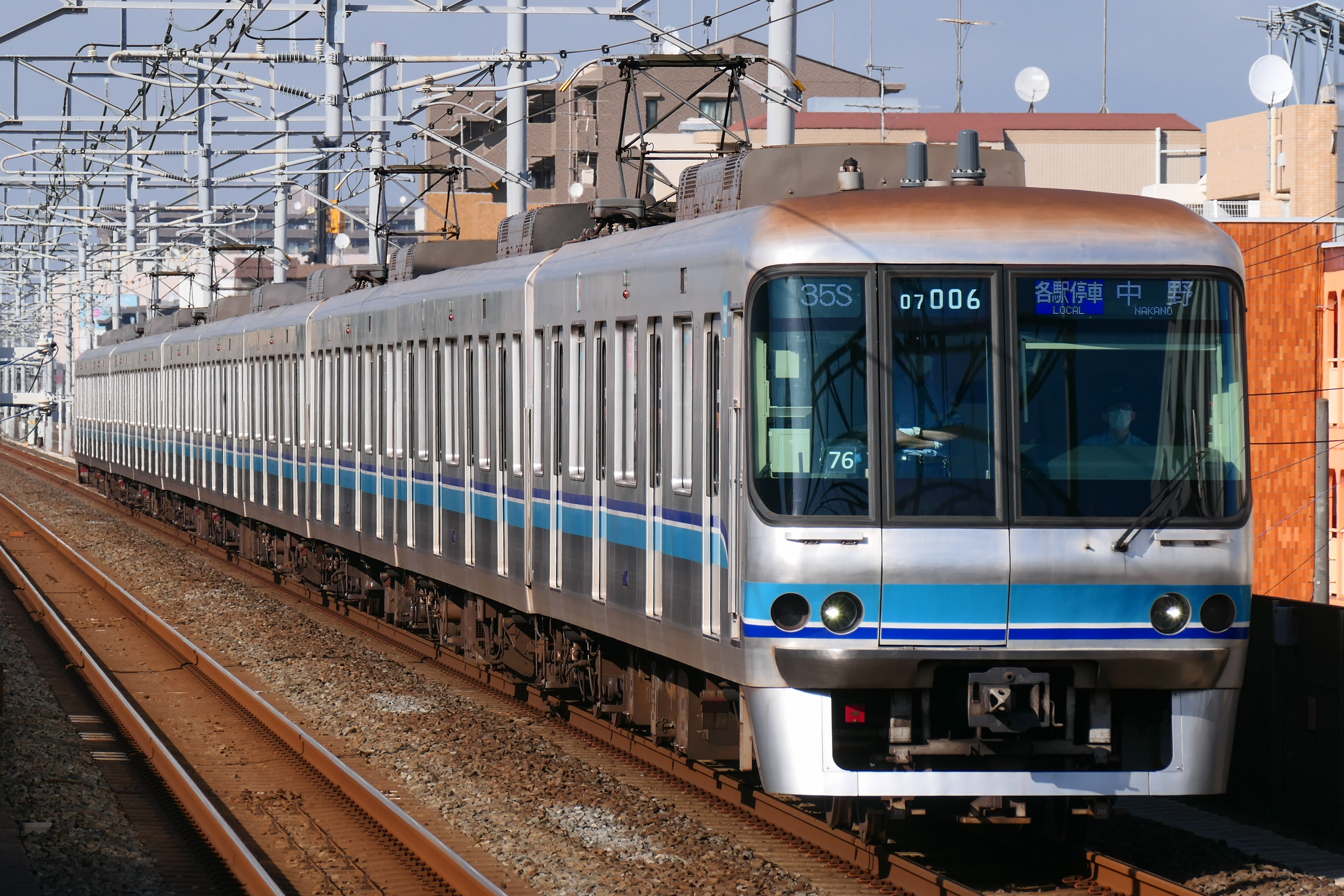
Tokyo Metro 07 series

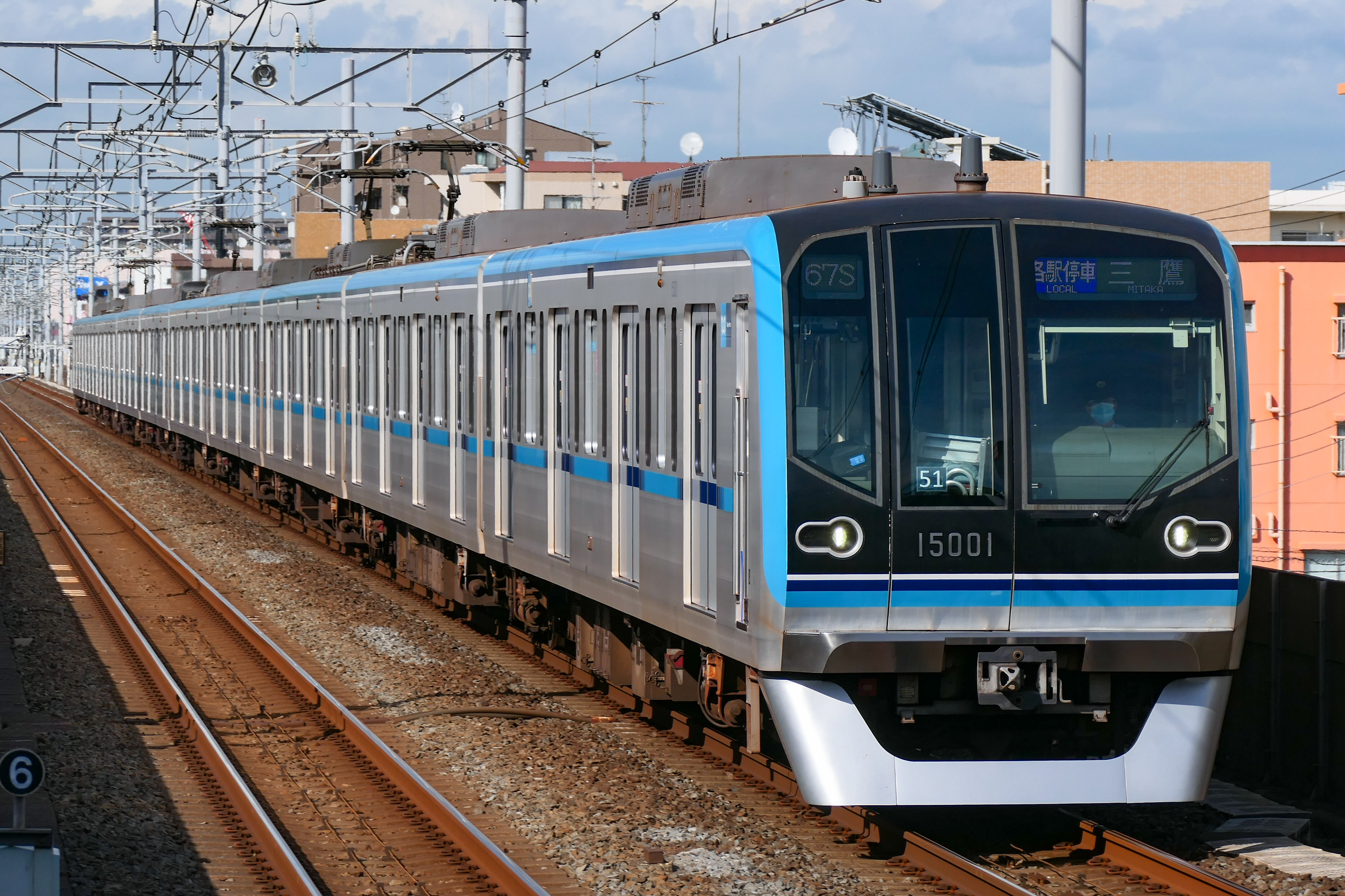
Tokyo Metro 15000 Series

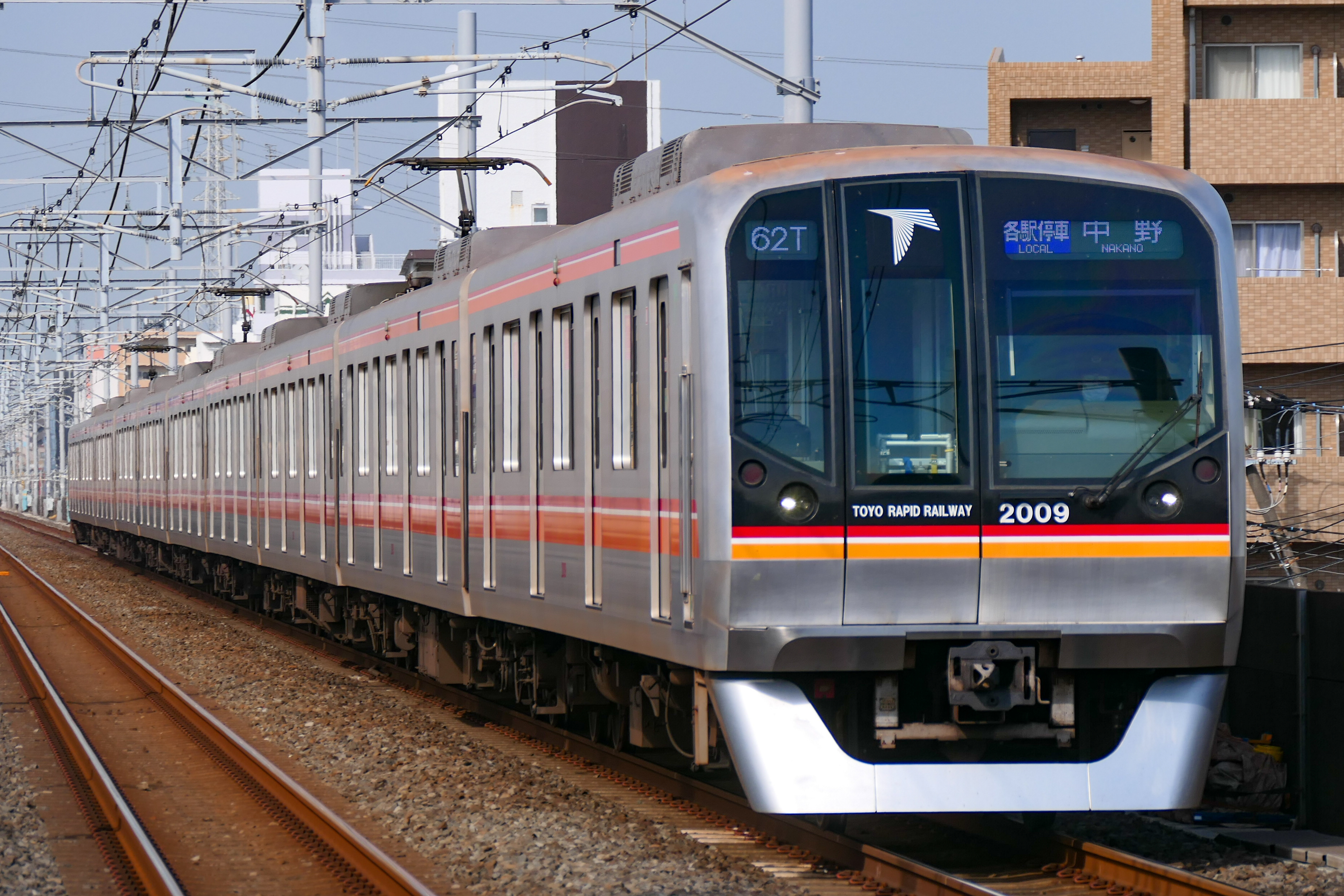
Toyo Rapid 2000 series

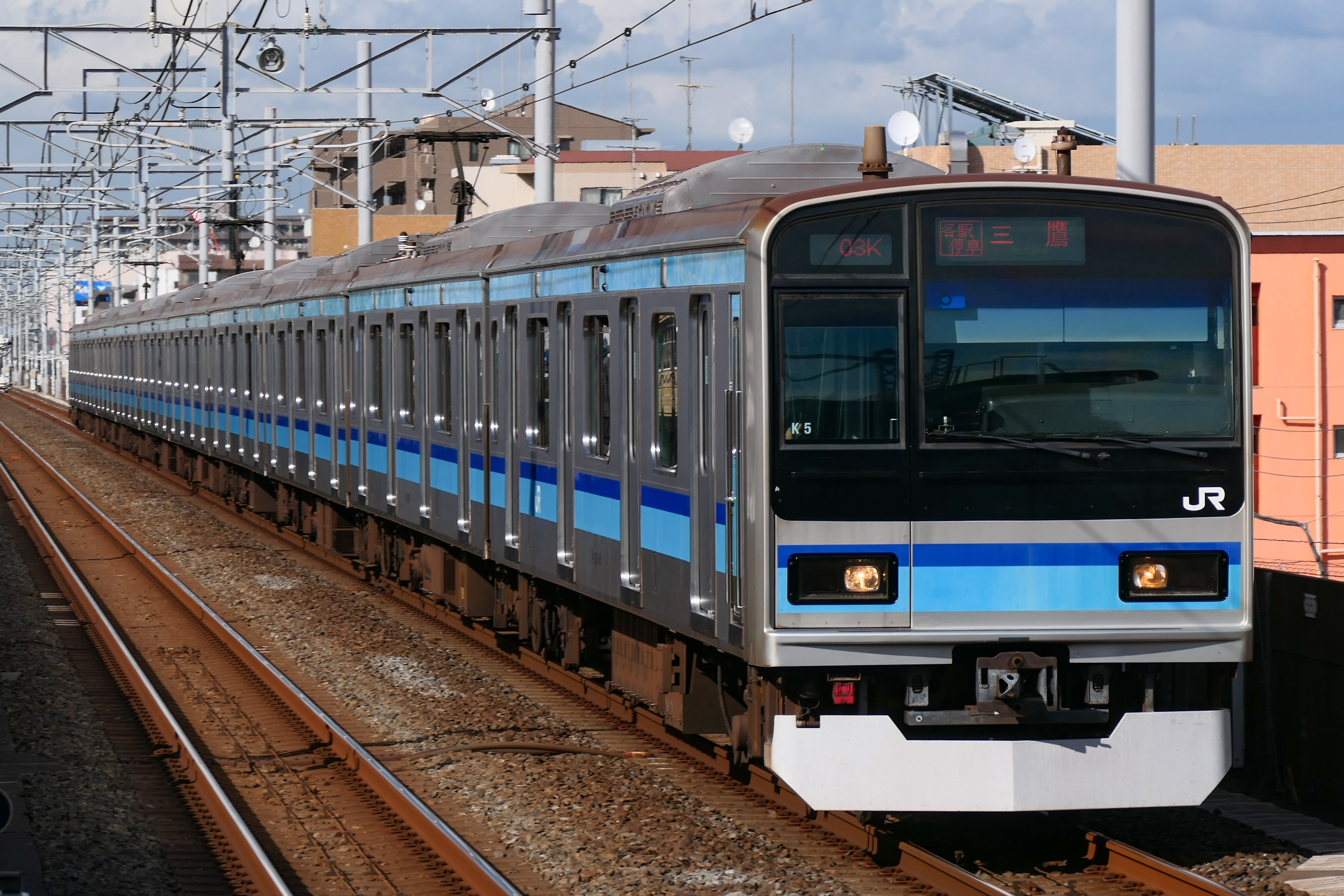
JR East E231-800 series

=== Past ===
- Tokyo Metro
  - 5000 series (from 1964 until 2007)
  - 8000 series (from 1987 until 1988, temporary, built for Hanzōmon Line)
- JR East
  - 301 series (from 1966 until 2003)
  - 103-1000 series (from 1989 until 2003)
  - 103-1200 series (from 1971 until 2003)
- Tōyō Rapid
  - 1000 series (from 1996 until 2006)
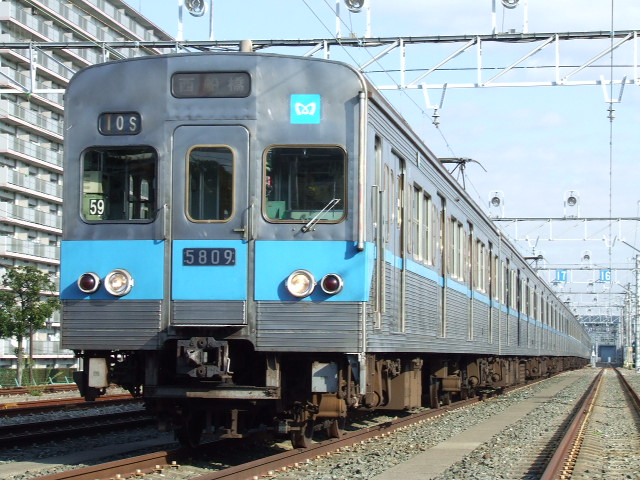
5000 series with stainless steel body

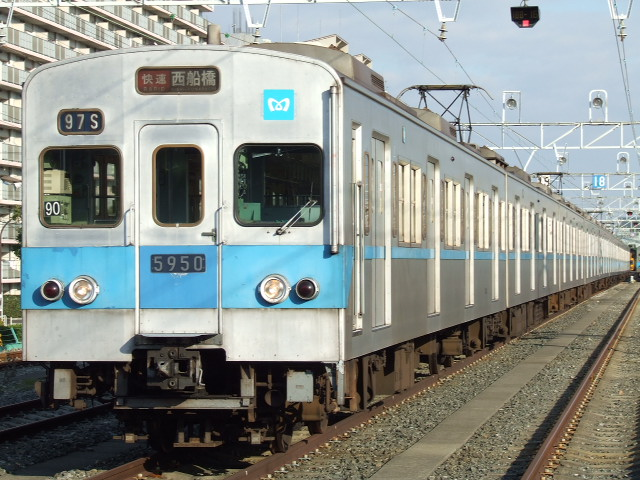
5000 series with aluminium body

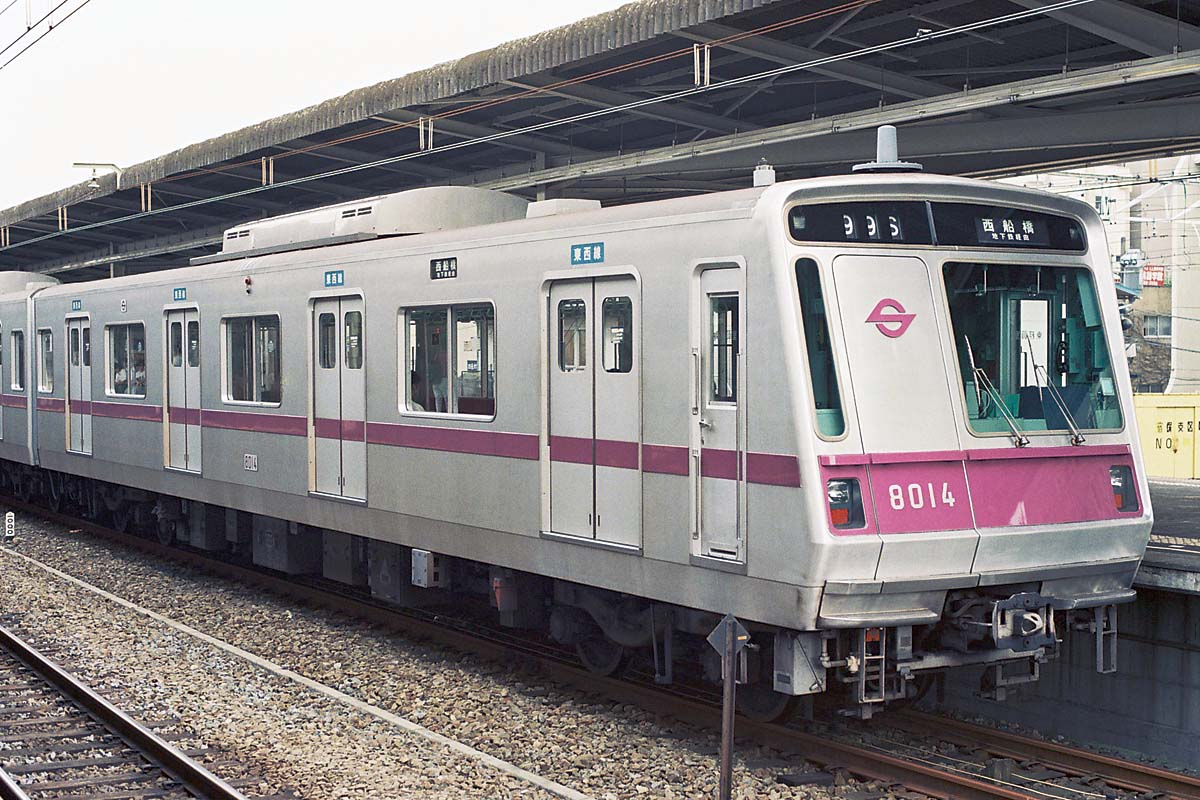
8000 series

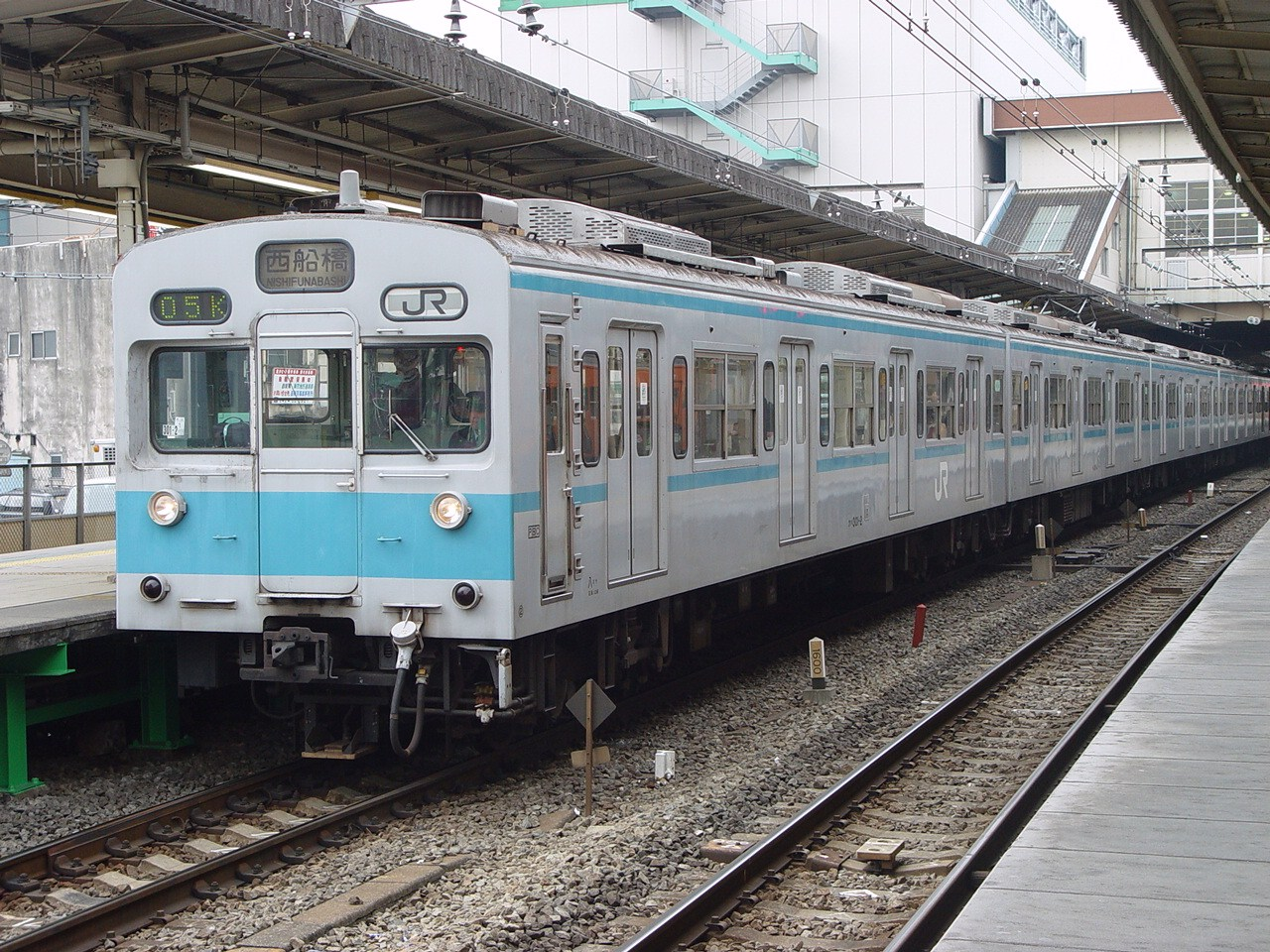
JR East 301 series in February 2003

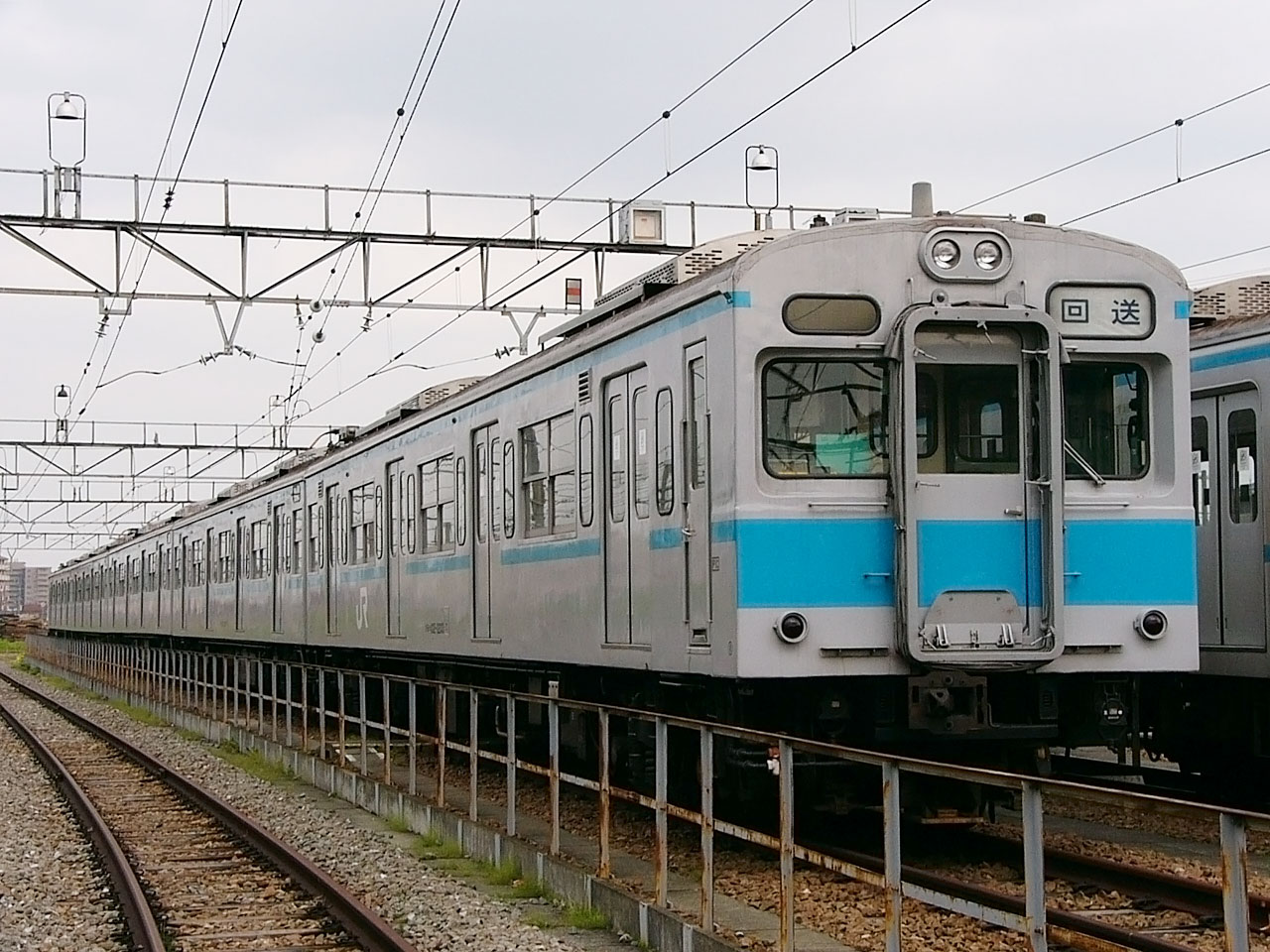
JR East 103–1200 series

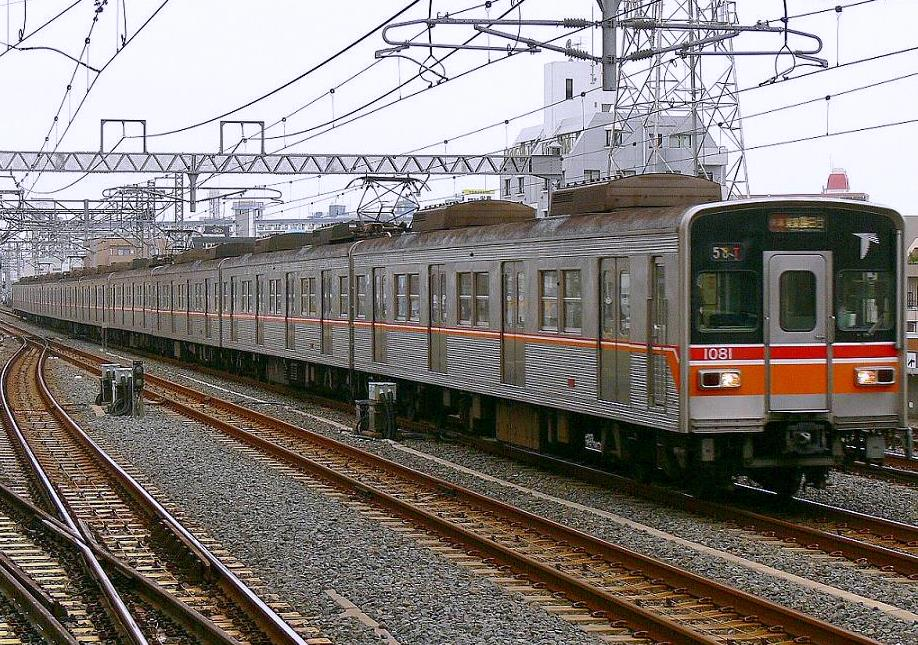
Tōyō Rapid 1000 series in September 2006

== Depots ==
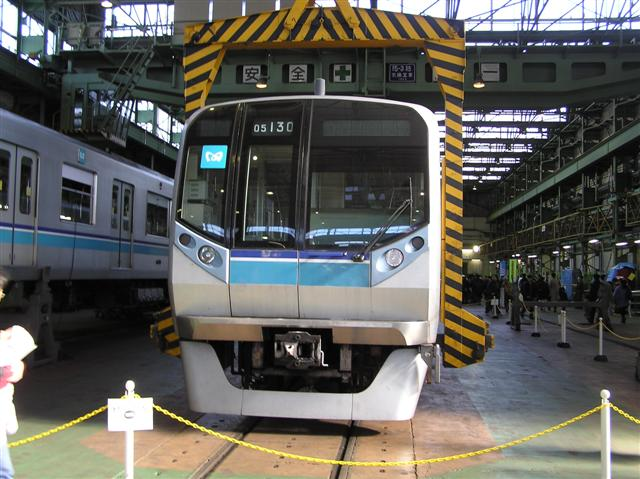
05N series EMU at Fukagawa Workshop

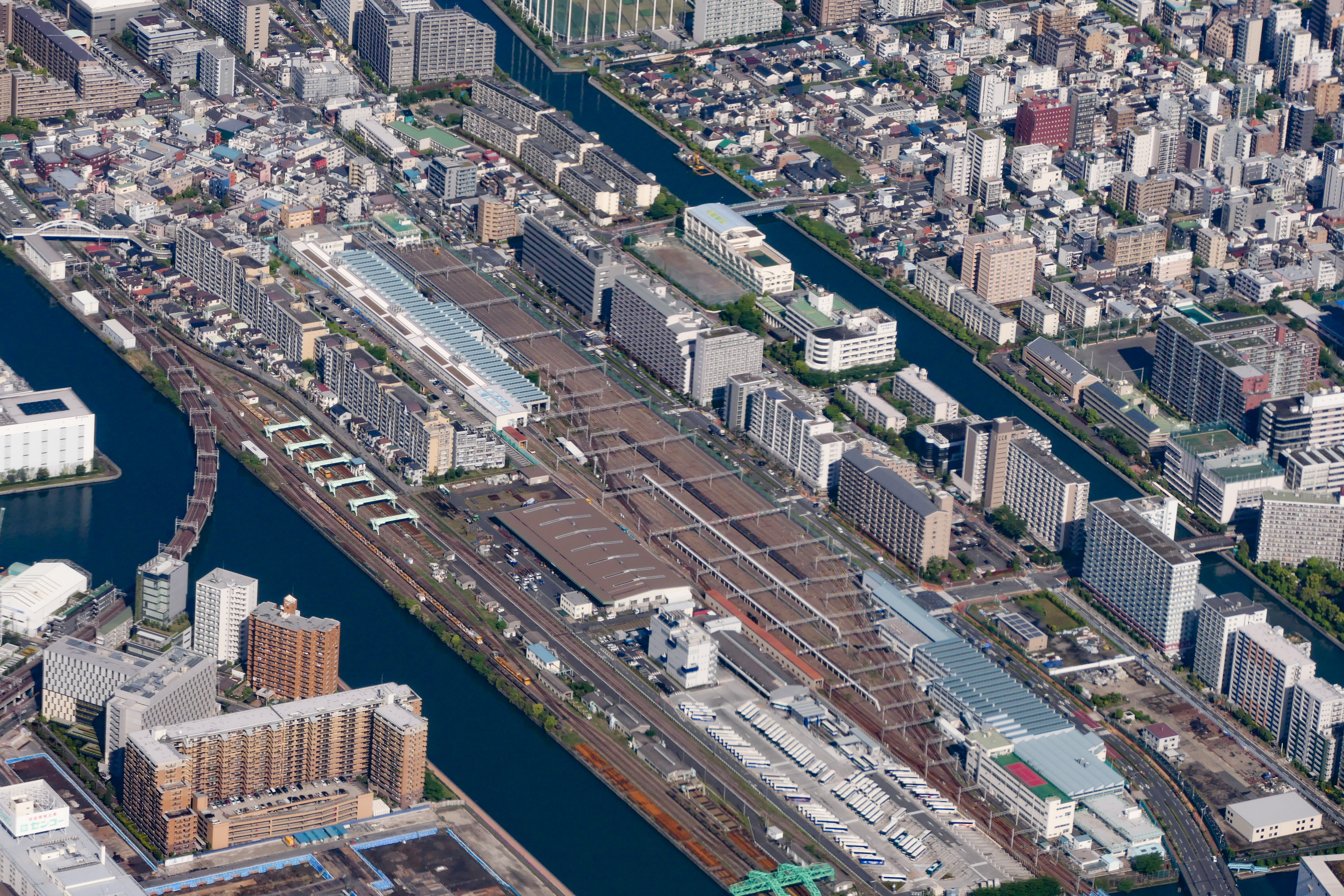
Fukagawa Depot, April 2021

- Fukagawa Depot (深川検車区)
- Gyōtoku Depot (深川検車区行徳分室)
- Fukagawa Workshop (深川工場)

== Notes ==
a. Crowding levels defined by the Ministry of Land, Infrastructure, Transport and Tourism:

100% — Commuters have enough personal space and are able to take a seat or stand while holding onto the straps or hand rails.
150% — Commuters have enough personal space to read a newspaper.
180% — Commuters must fold newspapers to read.
200% — Commuters are pressed against each other in each compartment but can still read small magazines.
250% — Commuters are pressed against each other, unable to move.
