= 301 series =

Japanese train type

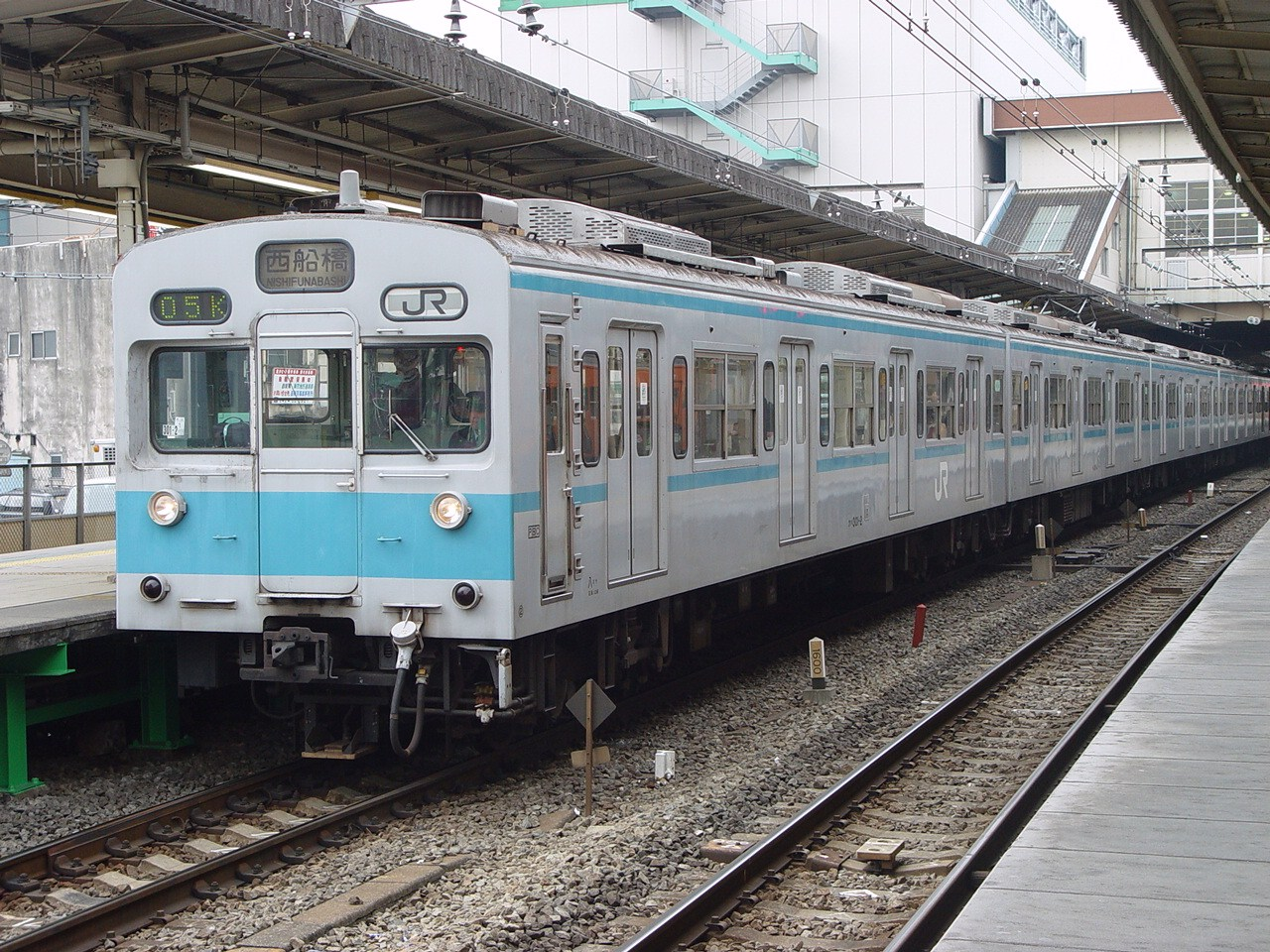
- 301 series set K5 in February 2003
- In service: 1966–2003
- Manufacturers: Kawasaki Heavy Industries, Nippon Sharyo
- Constructed: 1966–1969
- Scrapped: 2003
- Number built: 56 vehicles (8 sets)
- Number in service: None
- Number preserved: None
- Successor: E231-800 series
- Formation: 10 cars per trainset (originally 7 cars)
- Fleet numbers: K1–5
- Operators: JNR (1966–1987); JR East (1987–2003)
- Depot: Mitaka
- Lines served: Chuo-Sobu Line, Eidan Tozai Line

Specifications
- Car body construction: Aluminium
- Car length: 20 m (65 ft 7 in)
- Doors: 4 pairs per side
- Maximum speed: 100 km/h (62 mph)
- Electric systems: 1,500 V DC overhead catenary
- Current collection: Pantograph
- Safety systems: ATS-B/P, ATC
- Multiple working: 103-1200 series
- Track gauge: 1,067 mm (3 ft 6 in)

The 301 series (301系) was an electric multiple unit (EMU) train type introduced in 1966 by Japanese National Railways (JNR), and later operated by East Japan Railway Company (JR East) on Chuo-Sobu Line and Tozai Line subway through-running services in Tokyo, Japan, until 2003.

== Design ==
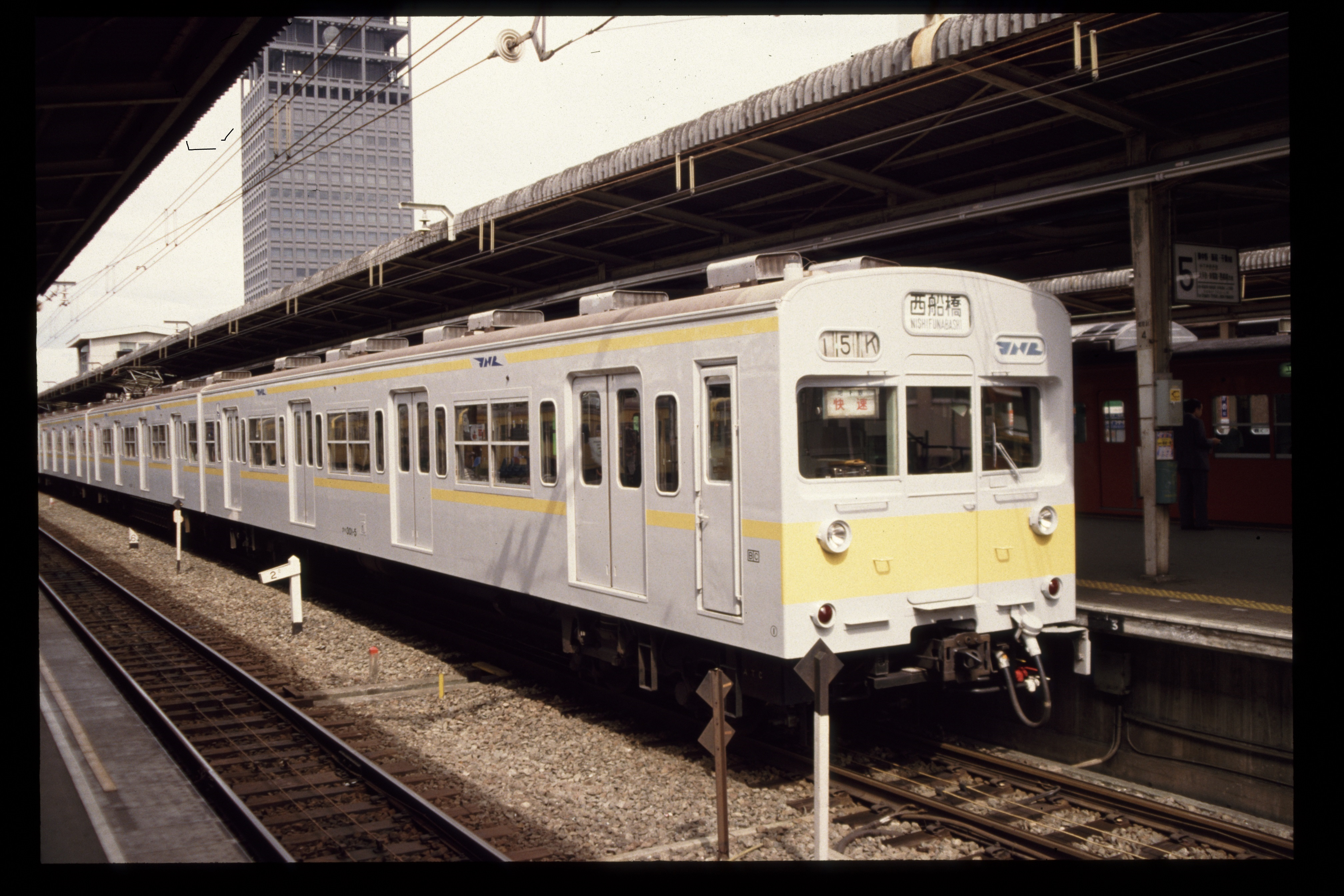
301 series set with original yellow bodyside stripe in April 1985

Broadly based on the 103 series commuter EMU, the 301 series was designed specifically for use on through-running services with the Eidan Tozai Line (present-day Tokyo Metro Tozai Line) in Tokyo, and was the first aluminium-bodied rolling stock introduced on Japanese National Railways (JNR).

When first delivered, the sets were finished with a clear acrylic paint, giving an unpainted appearance. The sets were subsequently painted in light grey with a yellow bodyside stripe. This was later changed to a light blue ("Blue No. 22") stripe to match the Tōzai Line line colour.

For cost reasons, only 56 vehicles were built, and subsequent rolling stock built for Tozai Line through-running services was conventional steel-bodied 103-1200 series stock.

== Operations ==
The 301 series trains were based at Mitaka Depot in Tokyo throughout their service life, and were used on Chūō-Sōbu Line local and Tozai Line subway through-running services.

== Formations ==
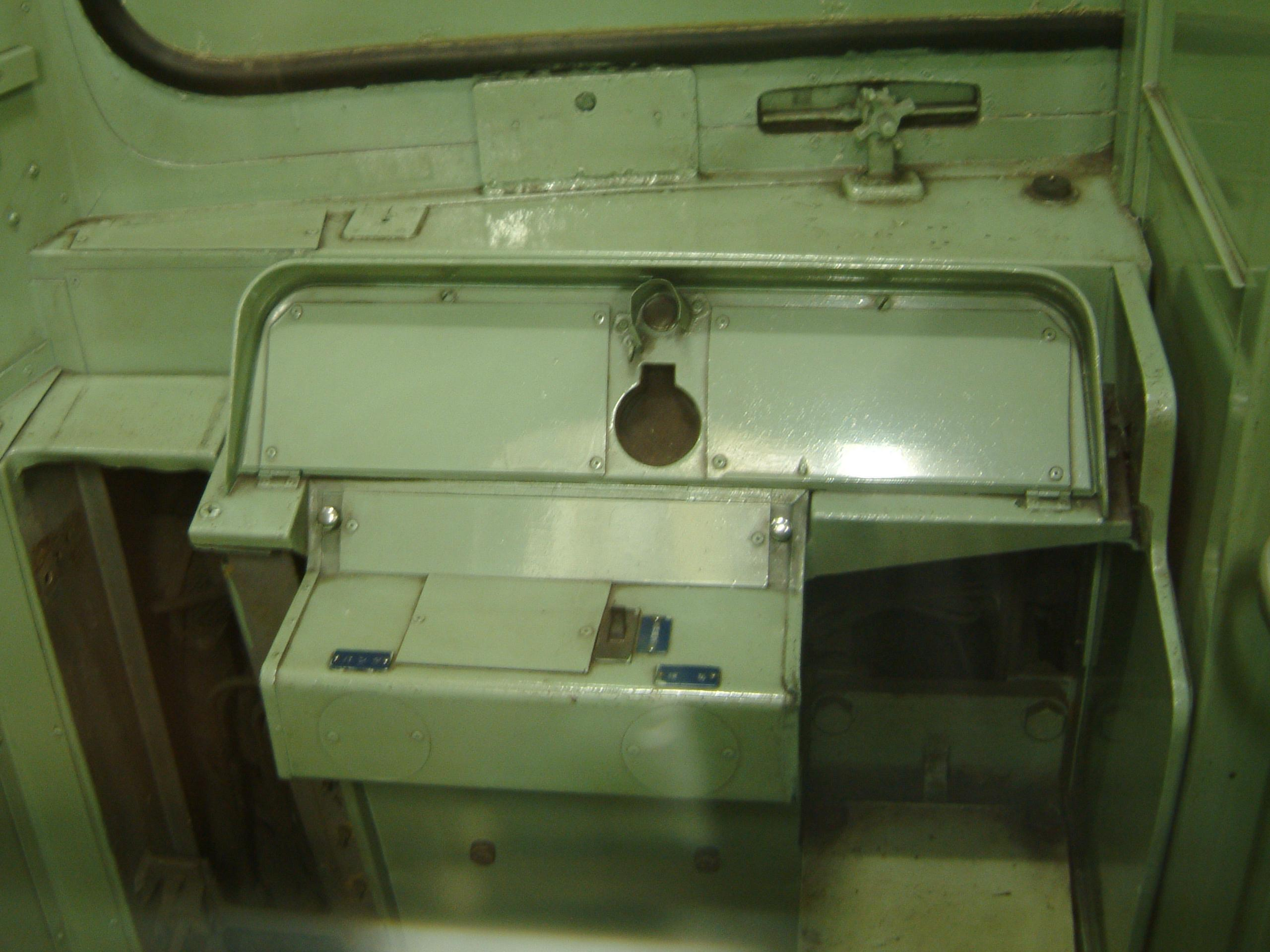
Former driving cab of KuMoHa 300-3 in May 2003 with the driving equipment removed

Following reforming into 10-car sets, the fleet was formed as follows, with car 1 at the Nishi-Funabashi end and car 10 at the Mitaka end. Sets K1 and K2 included former KuHa 301 and KuMoHa 300 driving cars with driving cab equipment removed.

=== Sets K1–2 ===
Car No.	1	2	3	4	5	6	7	8	9	10
Designation	Tc	M	M'	M	M'c	Tc	M	M'	M	M'c
Numbering	KuHa 301	MoHa 301	MoHa 300	MoHa 301	KuMoHa 300	KuHa 301	MoHa 301	MoHa 300	MoHa 301	KuMoHa 300

Cars 2, 4, 7, and 9 were each equipped with one lozenge-type pantograph.

=== Sets K3–5 ===
Car No.	1	2	3	4	5	6	7	8	9	10
Designation	Tc	M	M'	M	M'	T	M	M'	M	M'c
Numbering	KuHa 301	MoHa 301	MoHa 300	MoHa 301	MoHa 300	SaHa 301-100	MoHa 301	MoHa 300	MoHa 301	KuMoHa 300

Cars 2, 4, 7, and 9 were each equipped with one lozenge-type pantograph. SaHa 301-101 was modified from former MoHa 301-4, and retained the original pantograph mounting points.

== Interior ==
Seating consisted of longitudinal bench seating throughout. Compared with the 103 series seating, seat width was increased by 5 cm (2.0 in) to 55 cm (22 in) per person.

== History ==
The 301 series were delivered in 1966 to Mitaka Depot in Tokyo, initially formed as eight 7-car sets. From 1981, the fleet was reformed into 10-car sets with the creation of SaHa 301 trailer cars converted from former MoHa 300 and MoHa 301 motored cars.

As of 1 April 2002, 50 vehicles (5 x 10-car sets) remained in service, but the fleet was subsequently replaced by new E231-800 series EMUs and withdrawn during 2003.

A special Sayonara 301 series train was run by JR East on 3 August 2003.

== Preserved examples ==
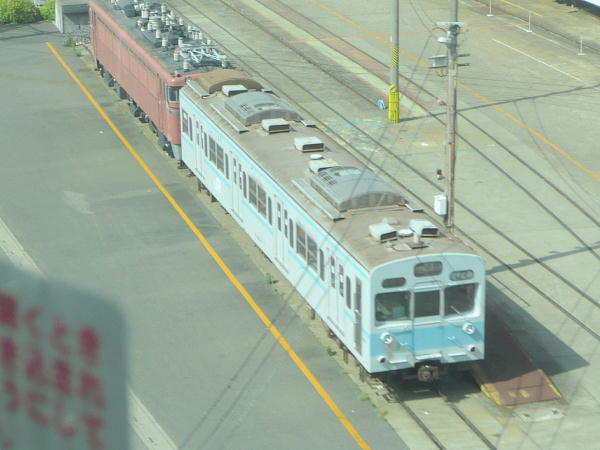
KuMoHa 300-4 stored inside Omiya Works in May 2007

Driving car KuMoHa 300-4 of set K2 is stored at JR East's Omiya Works, removed in 2017.
