= Minami-Sunamachi Station =

Metro station in Tokyo, Japan

Coordinates: 35.668824°N 139.83068°E

Minami-sunamachi Station 南砂町駅

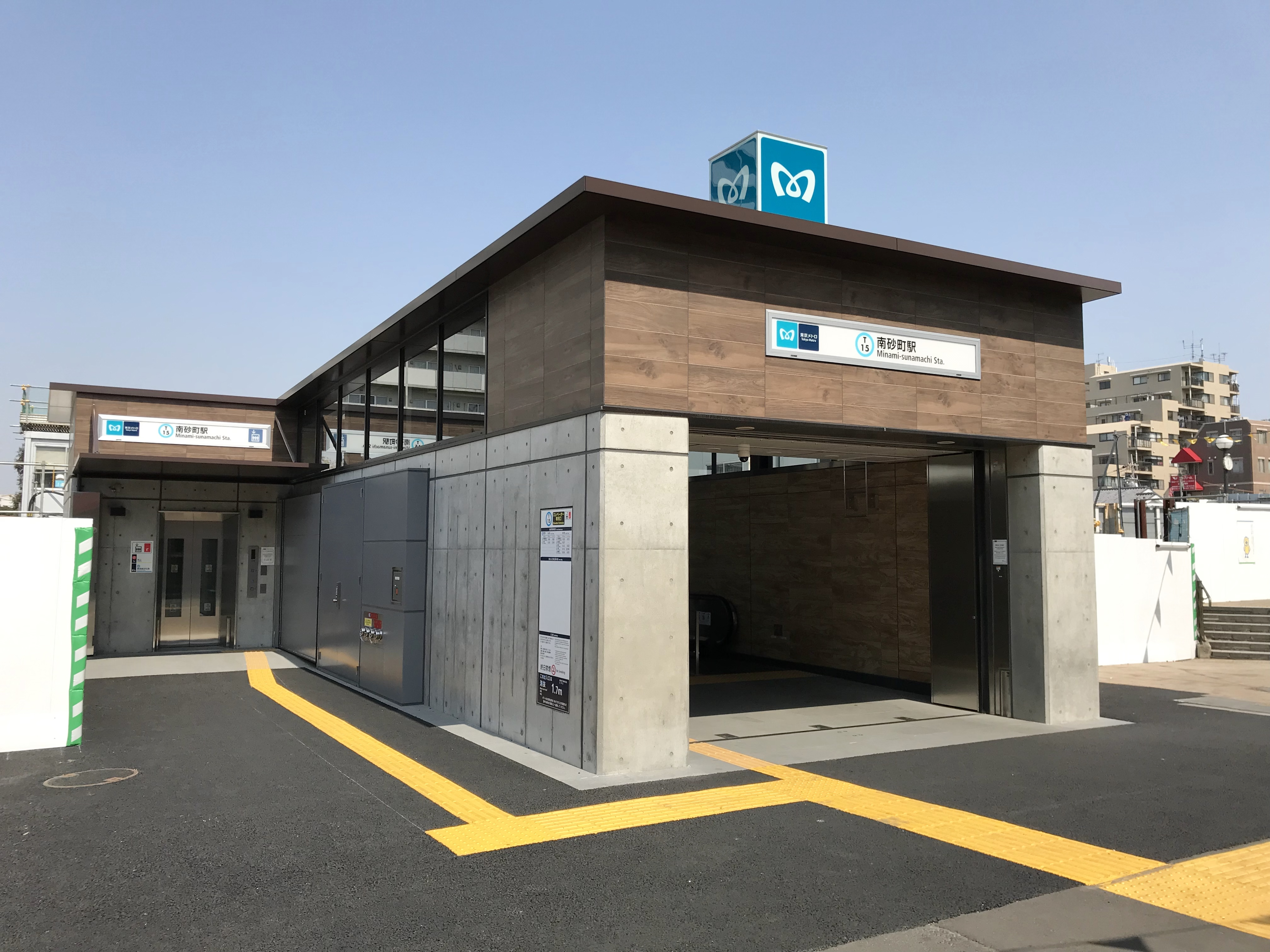
- Exit 3 in March 2019

General information
- Location: 3-11-85, Minami-Suna, Kōtō-ku, Tokyo; Japan
- Operator: Tokyo Metro
- Line: Tōzai Line
- Platforms: 1 island platform
- Tracks: 2

Construction
- Structure type: Underground

Other information
- Station code: T-15

History
- Opened: 29 March 1969; 57 years ago

Services
Preceding station	Tokyo Metro	Following station
Tōyōchō towards Nakano	Tōzai Line Commuter Rapid Local	Nishi-kasai towards Nishi-Funabashi
Location
- Location within Tokyo wards area Location within Tokyo Keiyo area Location within Kanto Area Location within Japan

Minami-sunamachi Station (南砂町駅, Minami-sunamachi-eki) is a railway station in Kōtō, Tokyo, Japan. Its station number is T-15.

== Lines ==
- Tokyo Metro Tōzai Line

== Station layout ==
The station consists of one island platform serving two tracks.

=== Platforms ===
1	Tōzai Line	for Nishi-Funabashi; Chuo-Sobu Line for Tsudanuma; Toyo Rapid Railway Line for Tōyō-Katsutadai
2	Tōzai Line	for Tōyōchō, Ōtemachi, and Nakano; Chuo-Sobu Line for Mitaka

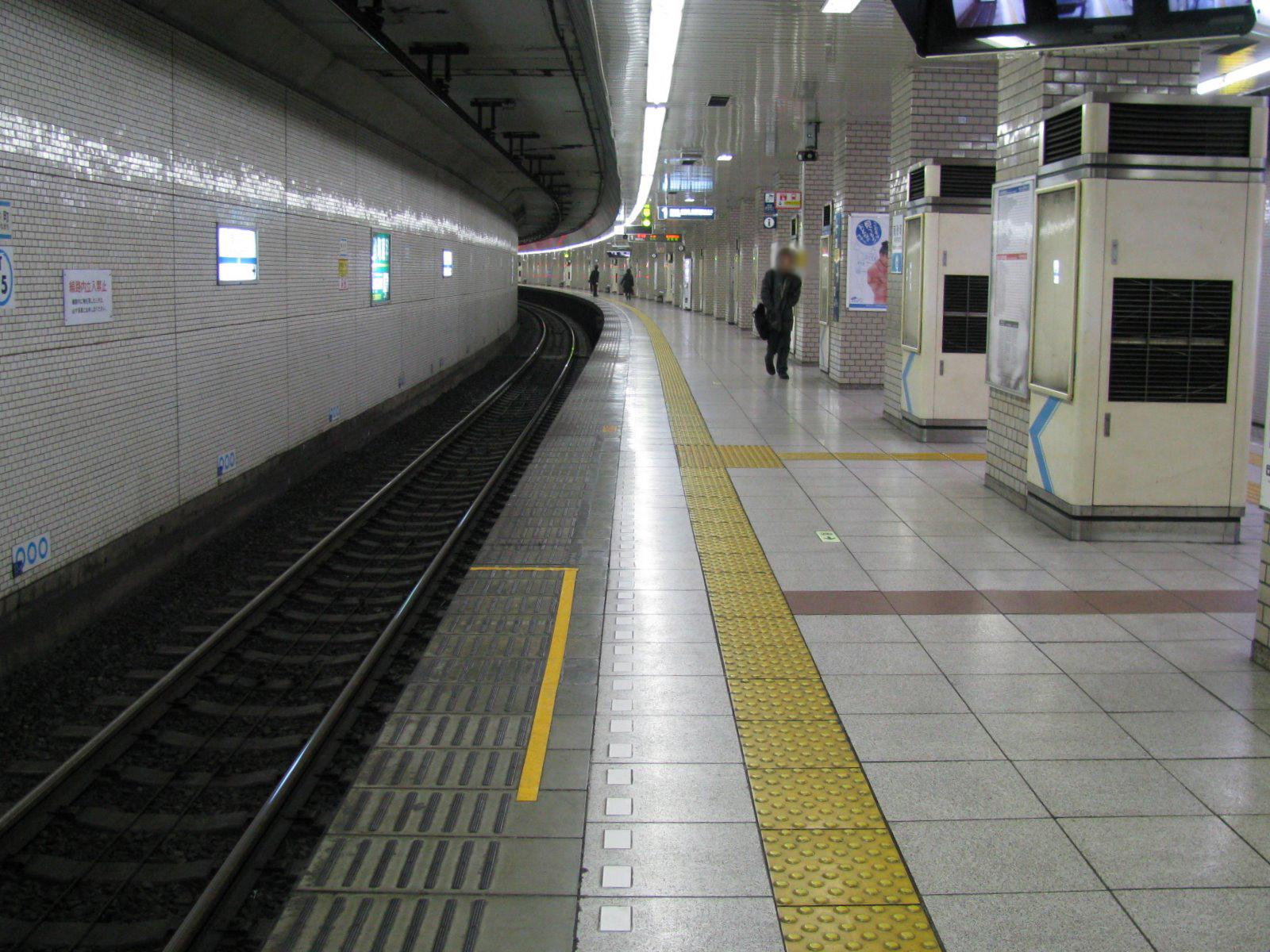
Platforms, 2008

== History ==
Minami-sunamachi Station opened on 29 March 1969.

The station facilities were inherited by Tokyo Metro after the privatization of the Teito Rapid Transit Authority (TRTA) in 2004.

=== Current plans ===
Work is underway to install an additional platform, resulting in track two undergoing a conversion to a Spanish solution platform layout. The installation of the new tracks serving the new platform is scheduled to take place over three phases, with the first phase scheduled to take place on 11–12 May 2024. At the end of construction, the station will consist of three tracks and two island platforms. The capacity upgrades come at the result of increased ridership in 2022 with the station having ranked 61st out of 130 stations on the Tokyo Metro.
