= Tōyōchō Station =

Metro station in Tokyo, Japan

Coordinates: 35.669626°N 139.817596°E

Tōyōchō Station 東陽町駅

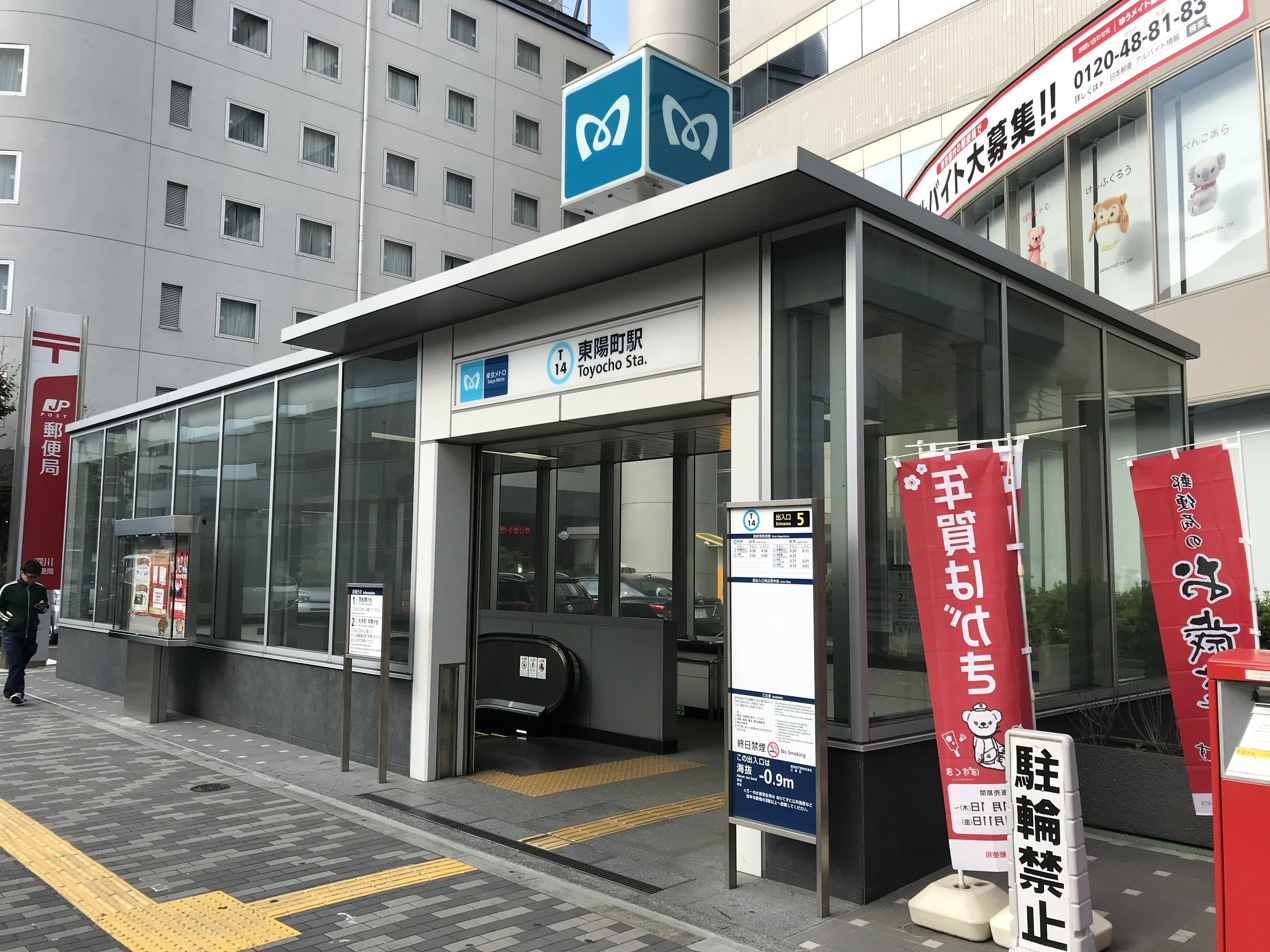
- Exit 5 in November 2018

General information
- Location: 2-1 Tōyō 4-chome Kōtō-ku Tokyo; Japan
- System: Tokyo subway
- Owner: Tokyo Metro Co., Ltd.
- Operator: Tokyo Metro
- Line: Tōzai Line
- Platforms: 2 side platforms
- Tracks: 2

Construction
- Structure type: Underground

Other information
- Station code: T-14

History
- Opened: 14 September 1967; 58 years ago

Services
Preceding station	Tokyo Metro	Following station
Kiba towards Nakano	Tōzai Line Rapid	Urayasu towards Nishi-Funabashi
Kiba towards Nakano	Tōzai Line Commuter Rapid Local	Minami-sunamachi towards Nishi-Funabashi
Location
- Location within Tokyo wards area Location within Tokyo Keiyo area Location within Kanto Area Location within Japan

Tōyōchō Station (東陽町駅, Tōyōchō-eki) is a railway station in Kōtō, Tokyo, Japan. Its station number is T-14.

== Lines ==
- Tokyo Metro Tozai Line

== Station layout ==
The station consists of two side platforms serving two tracks.

=== Platforms ===
1	Tōzai Line	for Nishi-Funabashi; Chuo-Sobu Line for Tsudanuma; Toyo Rapid Railway Line for Tōyō-Katsutadai
2	Tōzai Line	for Ōtemachi, Kudanshita, and Nakano; Chuo-Sobu Line for Mitaka

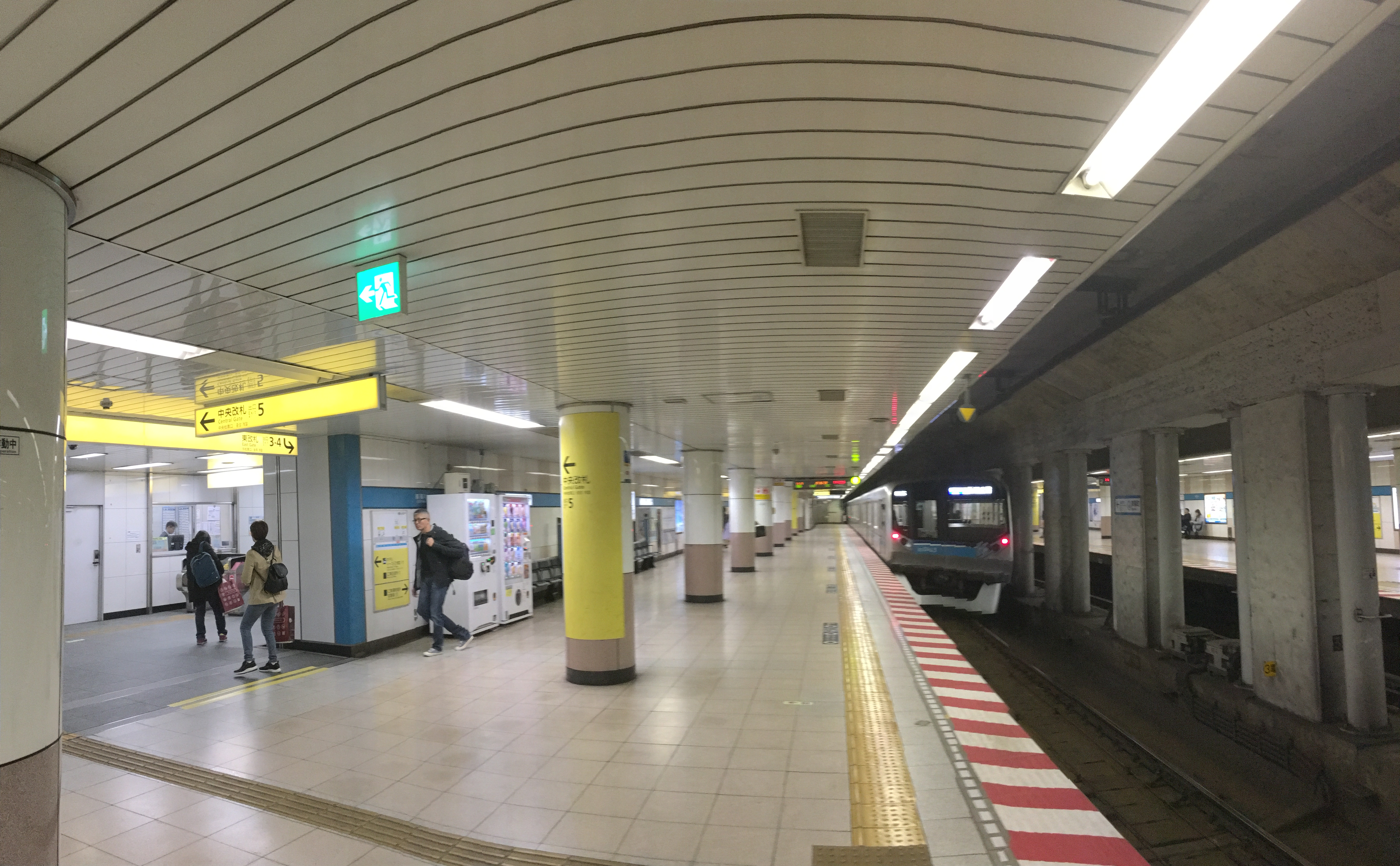
Station platforms, 2019

== History ==
Tōyōchō Station opened on 14 September 1967.

The station facilities were inherited by Tokyo Metro after the privatization of the Teito Rapid Transit Authority (TRTA) in 2004.

== Future developments ==
In 2021, plans were announced to branch the Yurakucho line at Toyosu Station, traveling north for 4.8 km (3.0 mi) connecting up to Sumiyoshi Station. This branch line, expected to be in service in the mid-2030s, will connect Tōyōchō Station with the region north and south of it.

A branch line from Toyosu Station has been planned since the early 1980s, heading north via Kameari Station (on the Jōban Line) to Noda in northwest Chiba Prefecture.
