= Myōden Station =

Metro station in Ichikawa, Chiba Prefecture, Japan

Myoden Station 妙典駅

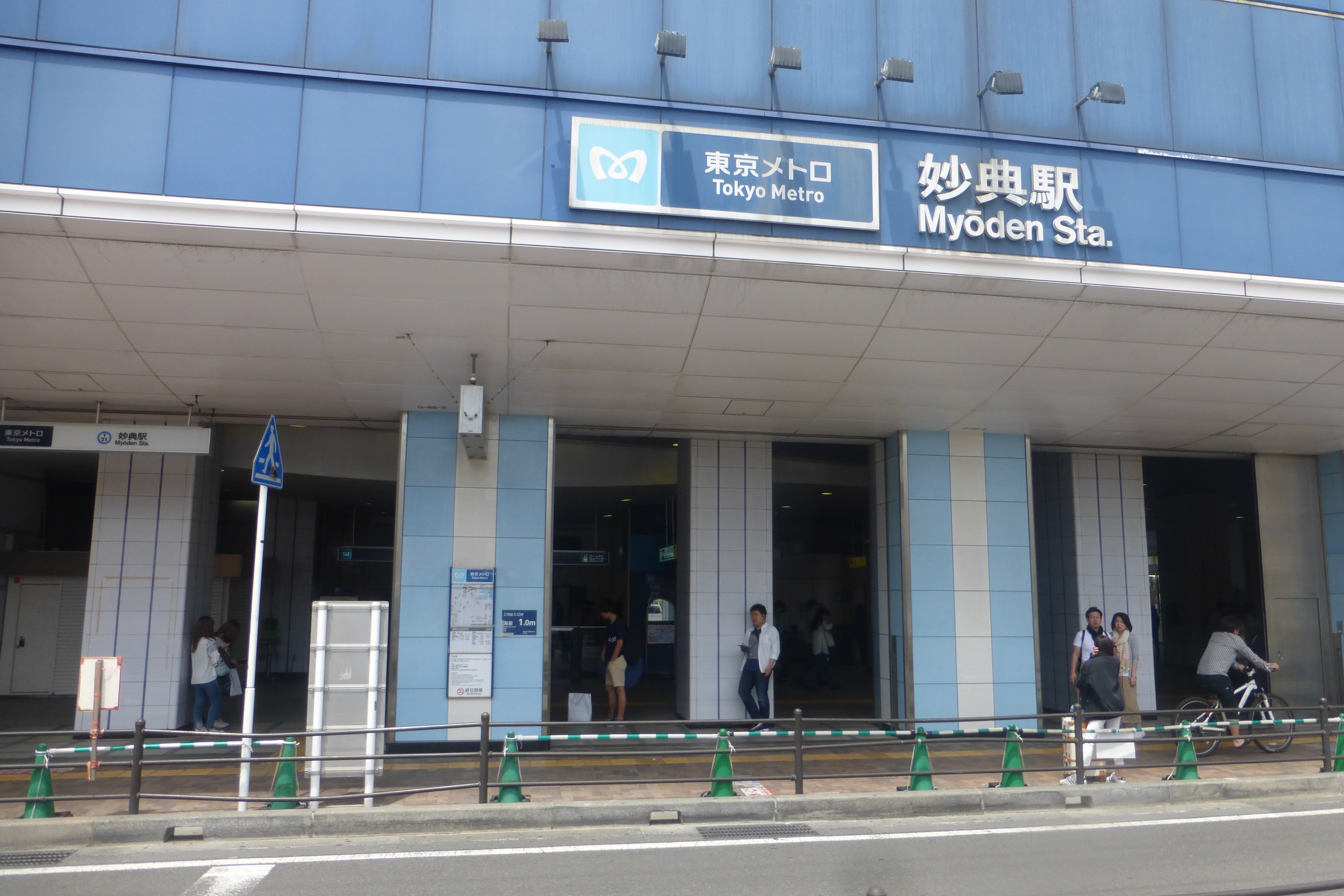
- The station exterior in 2017

General information
- Location: 1-2-10 Tomihama, Ichikawa City, Chiba Prefecture 272-0115; Japan
- Coordinates: 35.691592°N 139.925008°E
- Operator: Tokyo Metro
- Line: Tōzai Line
- Distance: 26.8 km (16.7 mi) from Nakano
- Platforms: 2 island platforms
- Tracks: 4

Construction
- Structure type: Elevated

Other information
- Station code: T-21
- Website: Official website

History
- Opened: 22 January 2000; 26 years ago

Passengers
- FY2019: 53,009

Services
Preceding station	Tokyo Metro	Following station
Gyōtoku towards Nakano	Tōzai Line Local	Baraki-Nakayama towards Nishi-Funabashi
Location
- Location within Tokyo Keiyo area Location within Kanto Area Location within Japan

Myōden Station (妙典駅, Myōden-eki) is a railway station on the Tokyo Metro Tozai Line in the city of Ichikawa, Chiba, Japan. It is operated by Tokyo Metro.

== Lines ==
Myōden Station is managed by the Tokyo Metro Tozai Line. It is 26.8 km (16.7 mi) from the line's terminus at Nakano.

== Station layout ==
This station is composed of two elevated island platforms that serves four tracks on the third floor. The trains travel to Nishi-Funabashi depart from either Track 1 or Track 2. The trains travel to Nakano depart from either Track 3 or Track 4. Trains depart from track 1 and 4.

=== Platforms ===
1,2	Tozai Line	for Nishi-Funabashi; Chuo-Sobu Line for Tsudanuma; Toyo Rapid Railway Line for Tōyō-Katsutadai
3,4	Tozai Line	for Toyocho, Otemachi, Nakano; Chuo-Sobu Line for Mitaka

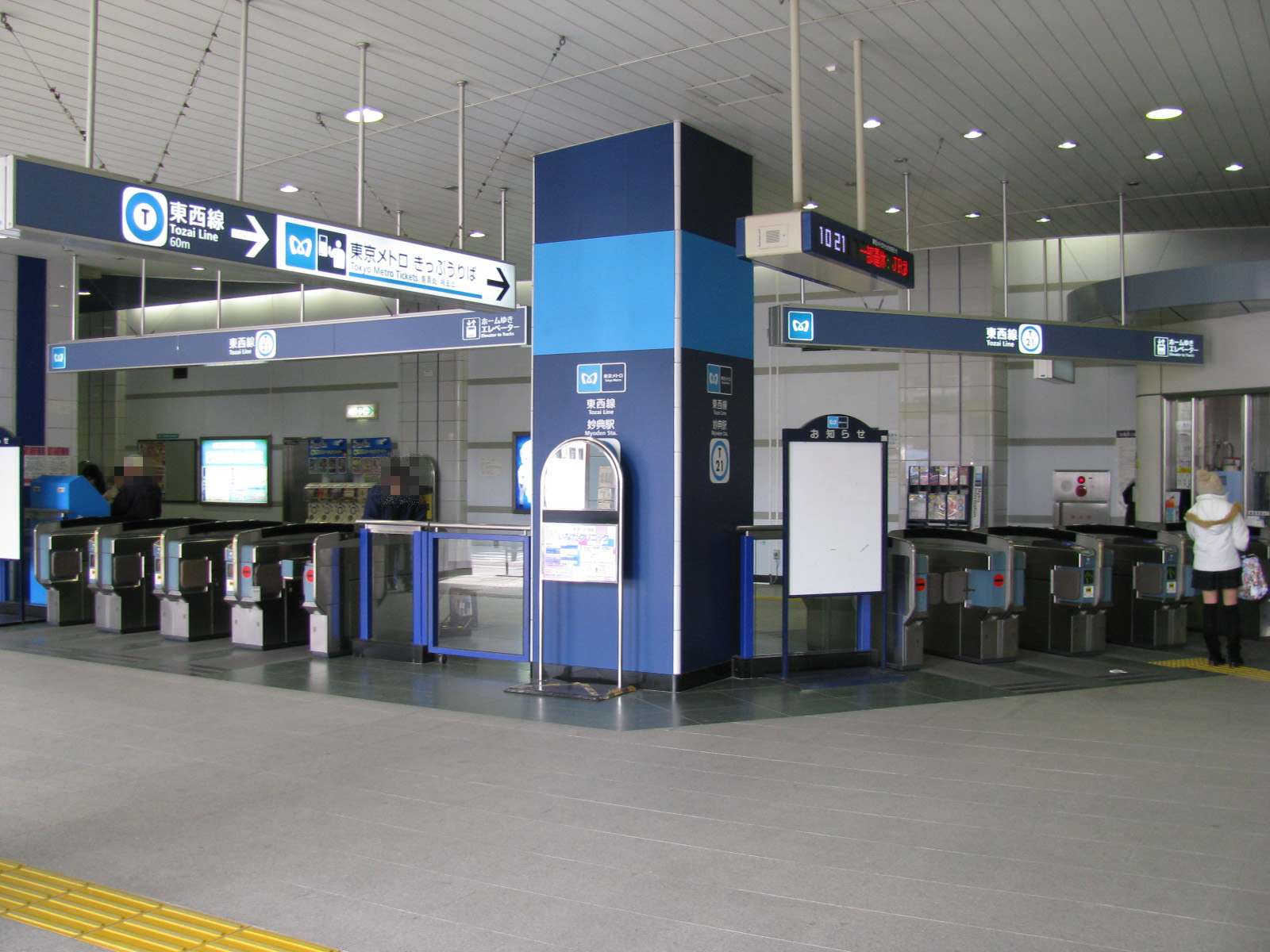
Ticket gates, 2008

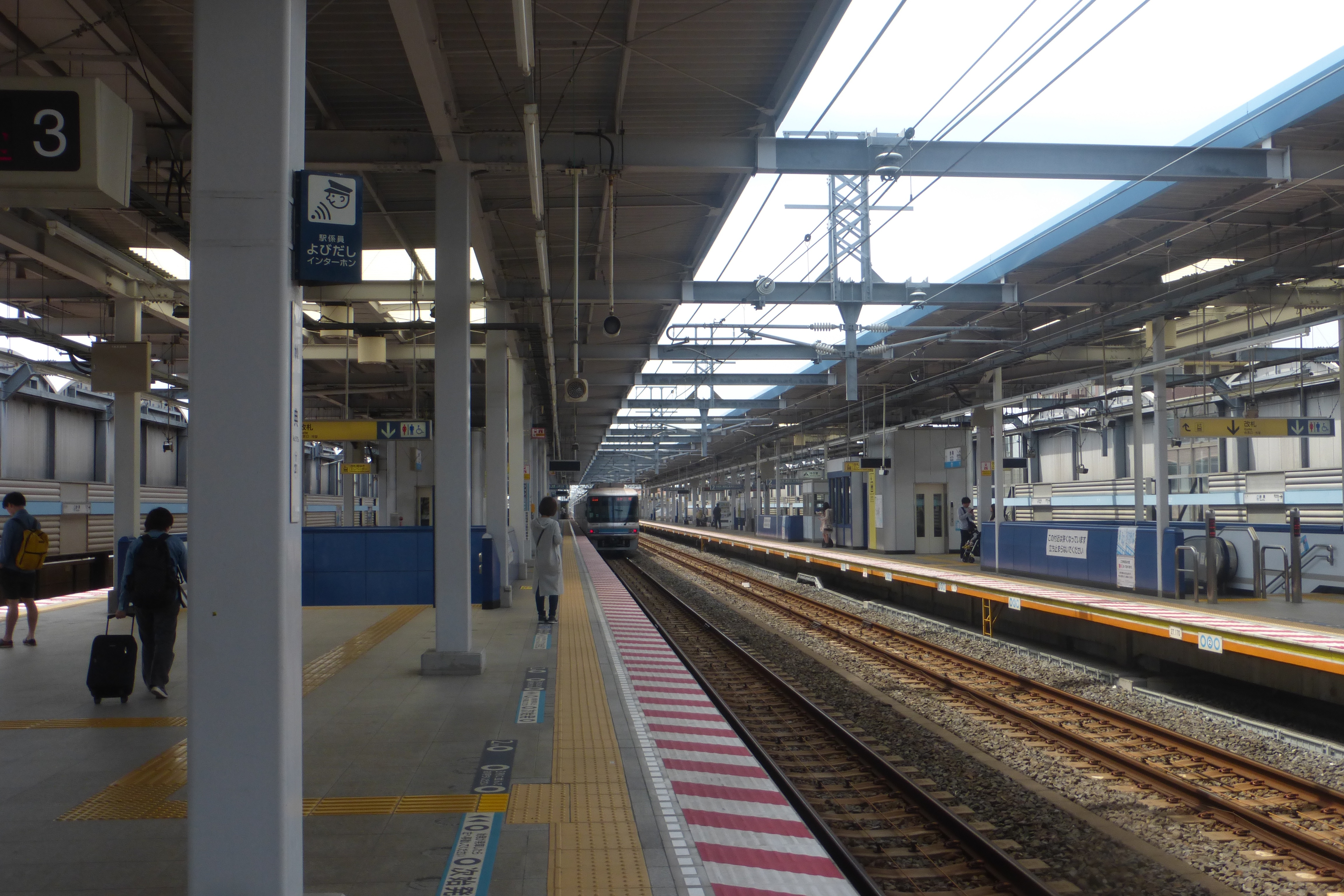
Platforms, 2017

== History ==
Myoden Station was established as Shimo-Myoden Signal Station (ja:下妙典信号場) by the Teito Rapid Transit Authority which was timed to be coincided with the Tozai Line extended to Nishi-Funabashi Station and opening to traffic on March 29, 1969. It had been used as a rail yard as the first/last trains depart/arrive from/at Gyōtoku station were parked. Construction for responding to a passenger-accessible station had not done until February 1997. Myōden Station was officially opened on January 22, 2000.

In 2004 the station's facilities were inherited by Tokyo Metro after the privatization of the Teito Rapid Transit Authority (TRTA).

== Passenger statistics ==
In 2019's fiscal year, the station saw a daily average of 53,009 passengers.

== Bus services ==
Myoden Station bus stop
Bus stop	No	Via	Destination	Company	Note
Route bus	行徳02	Saiwai Chuo Park, Verena City Gyotoku, Gyotoku Sogo Hospital, Saiwai 2 chome, Gyotoku Chuo Hospital, Niihama Elementary school	Gyotoku Station	Keisei Transit Bus	
Route bus	塩浜02	Saiwai Chuo Park, Verena City Gyotoku, Gyotoku Sogo Hospital, Saiwai 2 chome, Gyotoku Chuo Hospital, Chidoricho	Ichikawa-Shiohama Station	Keisei Transit Bus	
Route bus	妙典05	Baraki-Nakayama Station	Motoyawata Station	Keisei Transit Bus	
Wakuwaku Bus	1803	Shin-Gyotoku bashi-minami, Tajiri 3 chome	Gendai Sangyo Kagakukan-Media Park (Note: Passengers are able to transfer onto free shuttle buses bound for Motoyawata Station.)	Keisei Transit Bus	
Wakuwaku Bus	1801	Gyotoku Station, Minami-Gyotoku Station	Tokyo Bay Iryo-center (Note: It takes about 10 minutes to travel from here to Urayasu Station (Chiba) on foot. Passengers are able to board on the Urayashi City Community Bus "OSAMPO BUS" Iryo Center Line bound for Shin-Urayasu Station via Urayasu Station.)	Keisei Transit Bus	

Tomihama bus stop (Note: It takes about 5 minutes from here to Myoden Station on foot.)
Bus stop	No	Via	Destination	Company	Note
Route bus	行徳01	Saiwai Chuo Park, Verena City Gyotoku, Gyotoku Sogo Hospital, Saiwai 2 chome, Gyotoku Chuo Hospital, Niihama Elementary school	Gyotoku Station	Keisei Transit Bus	
Route bus	塩浜01	Saiwai Chuo Park, Verena City Gyotoku, Gyotoku Sogo Hospital, Saiwai 2 chome, Gyotoku Chuo Hospital, Chidoricho	Ichikawa-Shiohama Station	Keisei Transit Bus	
Route bus	行徳03	Dainana-chu, Gyotoku Station	Ichikawa-Shiohama Station	Keisei Transit Bus	
Airport bus	Limousine bus		Haneda Airport	Keisei Transit Bus	

== See also ==
- List of railway stations in Japan
