= Keisei Transit Bus =

Japanese bus company

Keisei Transit Bus Co., Ltd.
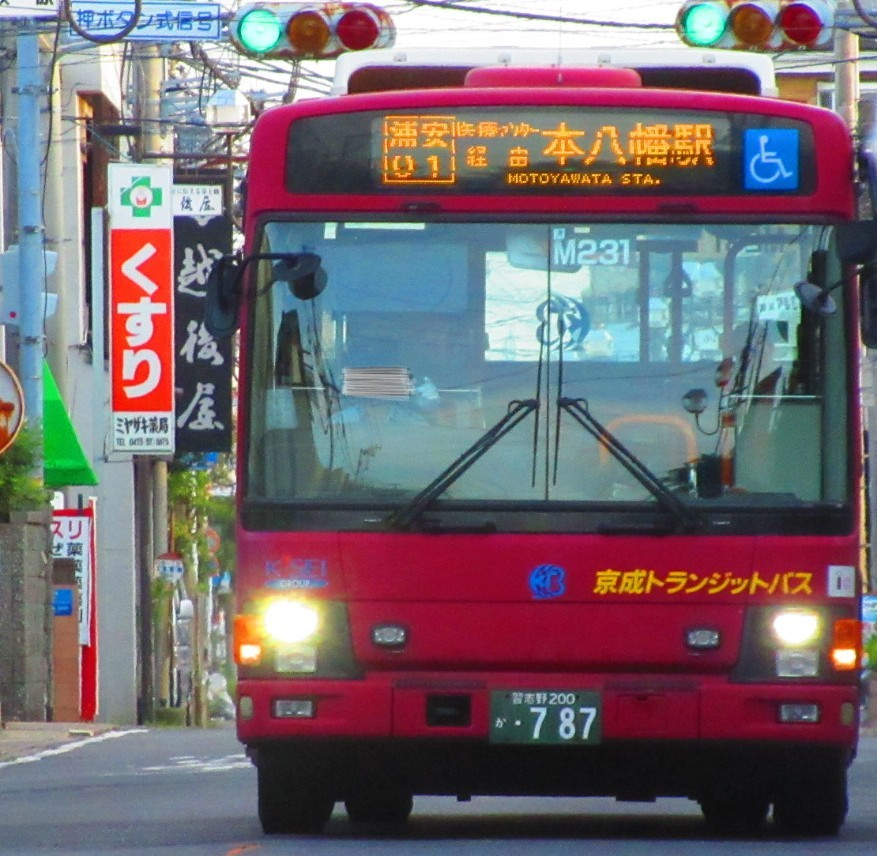
- Isuzu Erga （used for a lot of route buses）
- Parent: Keisei Bus, Oriental Land, Keisei Electric Railway
- Founded: February 1999
- Headquarters: 2-17-4 Shiohama, Ichikawa, Chiba, Japan
- Service area: Chiba
- Service type: Bus
- Routes: Route map
- Fleet: 150 buses
- Chief executive: Takehiro Fujimoto
- Website: Keisei Transit Bus (in Japanese)

The Keisei Transit Bus Co., Ltd. (京成トランジットバス株式会社, Keisei Transit Bus Kabushiki gaisya) was a Japanese bus company. It was formed by Keisei Bus (Keisei Group) and Oriental Land Company, on 2 February 1999. Keisei Transit Bus had two barns, one in Shiohama Ichikawa, the other in Chidori Urayasu. In March 2025, this company was merged into Keisei Bus Chiba West.

== History ==
This company was established in 1999 to transport passengers and staff to the Tokyo Disney Resort by bus.

In 2001, as the bus department of Keisei Electric Railway was split into parent and child companies, the Urayasu Line and Gyotoku Line were transferred to Keisei Transit Bus from Keisei Electric Railway. Simultaneously, the Braki Line and Ōsu Line were transferred to Ichikawa Kōtsū from Keisei Electric Railway. In 2006, Kaijin Line was transferred from Keisei Bus Funabashi Office, giving it a bus route in Funabashi. In 2009, Ōsu Line and Baraki Line were transferred from Ichikawa Kōtsū. This company operated five bus routes thereafter.

Ichikawa Kotsu was renamed Keisei Taxi Ichikawa in 2012. This companies' main operation has been taxis since the bus routes transferred to Keisei Transit Bus in 2009.

This company commenced operating a highway bus route connecting Chōfu Station (Tokyo) and Tokyo Disney Resort in step with Keio Bus. The Ichikawa・GyotokuーHaneda Airport Line was transferred to the company in July 2014.

In April 2025, due to the reorganization of the Keisei Bus Group, it was merged with Funabashi Shin-Keisei Bus, Matsudo Shin Keisei Bus, and Tokyo Bay City Bus, and is currently operated as Keisei Bus Chiba West.

== Bus route ==
=== Highway buses ===
Name	Departure	Via	Destination	Note
Ichikawa・GyotokuーHaneda Airport Line	Ichikawa Station	Tomihama (Myoden Station)・Gyotoku Station	Haneda Airport	The buses do not stop at Gyotoku Station and Tomihama due to suspension of traffic for the Ichikawashi Summer Evening Fireworks Display, held in August.
Airport Bus Tokyo・Narita	Tokyo Station・Ginza Station・Telecom Center Station・Shinonome Station	Non-stop	Narita Airport	
Airport Bus Tokyo・Narita	Narita Airport	Non-stop	Tokyo Station	
Chōfu Station (Tokyo) ー Tokyo Disney Resort Line	Chofu Station	Non-stop	Tokyo Disney Resort	
Kawagoe・Ōmiya ー Tokyo Disney Resort Line	Kawagoe Station	Ōmiya Station	Tokyo Disney Resort	
Musashi-Urawa・Ikebukuro ー Tokyo Disney Resort Line	Musashi-Urawa Station	Ikebukuro Station	Tokyo Disney Resort	
Musashi-Kosugi・Futako-Tmagawaー Tokyo Disney Resort Line	Musashi-Kosugi Station	Futako-Tamagawa Station	Tokyo Disney Resort	
Iwaki・Hitachi ー Tokyo Disney Resort Line	Iwaki Station	Hitachi Station	Tokyo Disney Resort	

=== Route buses ===
- Urayasu Line
  - (浦安01/02/03/04/10) Mutually operated from Urayasu Station (Chiba) and Shin-Urayasu Station or Ichikawa-Shiohama Station through Motoyawata Station or Ichikawa Station and Motoyawata Station respectively
  - (浦安05) Urayasu Station (Chiba) - High Town Shiohama - Ichikawa-Shiohama Station
- Gyotoku Line (行徳01/02/03)
  - Ichikawa-Shiohama Station - Gyotoku Station - Myoden Station
- Myoden Line (妙典05)
  - Myoden Station - Baraki-Nakayama Station - Motoyawata Station
- Futamata Line (二俣01)
  - Futamata-Shinmachi Station - Baraki-Nakayama Station - Motoyawata Station
- Shiohama Line (塩浜01/02/03)
  - Ichikawa-Shiohama Station - Myoden Station
- Kaijin Line (西船21)
  - Nishi-Funabashi Station - Funabashi Central Hospital - Hinagiku Kindergarten - Suwa Jinja
- Nakayama Line (市川05)
  - Nishi-funabashi Station - Ichikawa Station
- Ichikawa City Community Bus Wakuwaku Bus
  - Tokyo Bay Medical Center - Minami-Gyotoku Station - Gyotoku Station - Myoden Station - Chiba Museum of Science and Industry Media Park Ichikaw

== Mascot ==
A stray cat named "Shishimaru" lived in the company's Shiohama Barn. And, "Toranya" which is a cat originated from "Shishimaru" was created as a mascot in 2021 with the company's 20th anniversary.

== See also ==
- Tokyo Bay City Bus
- Keisei Bus
- Kanto Railway
  - Kantetsu Green Bus
  - Kantetsu Purple Bus
- Kominato Railway
