= Tokyo Bay City Bus =

Bus company in Urayasu, Chiba Prefecture

Tokyo Bay City Koutsu Co., Ltd.
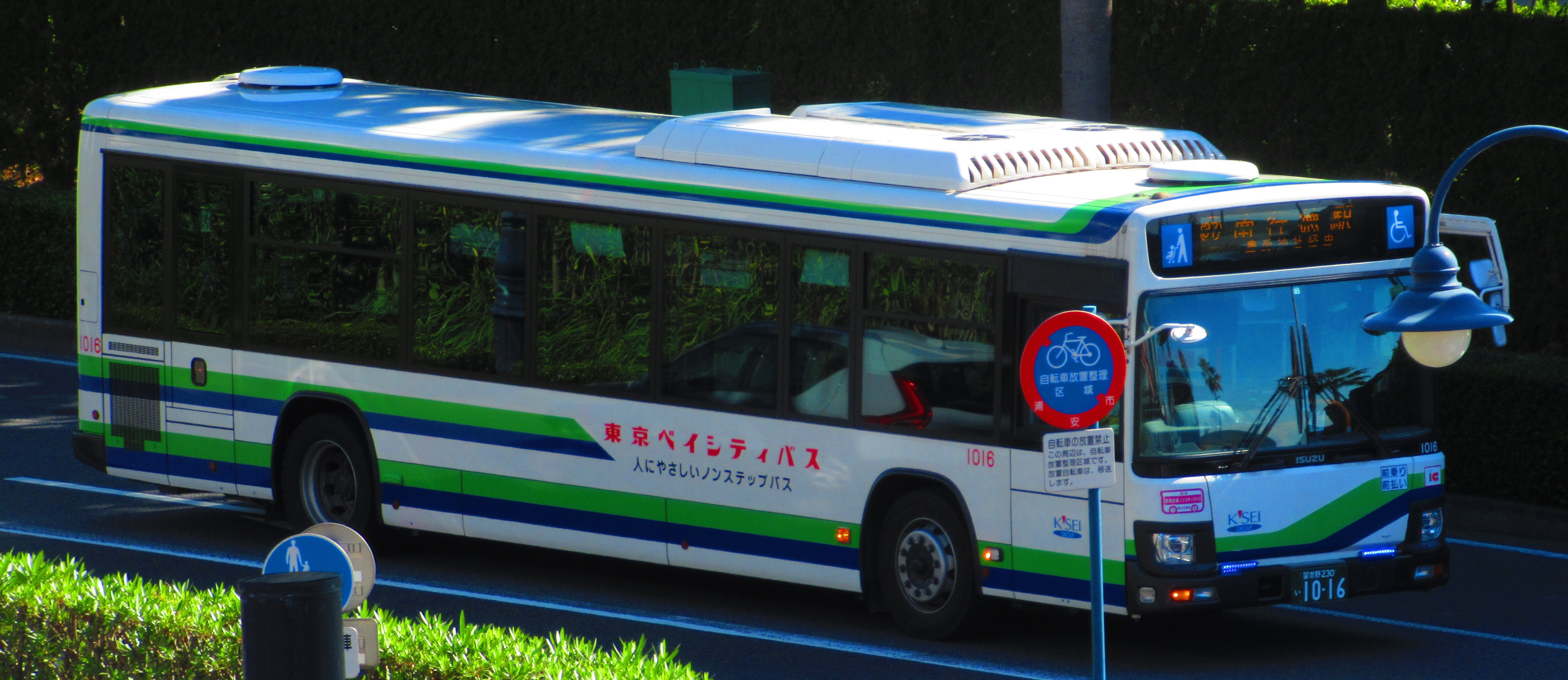
- A Tokyo Bay City Koutsu Isuzu Erga.
- Parent: Keisei Bus, Oriental Land, Keisei Electric Railway
- Founded: November 1976
- Headquarters: 12-5 Chidori, Urayasu, Chiba, Japan
- Service area: Chiba
- Service type: Bus
- Routes: Route bus, Highway bus
- Fleet: 143 buses
- Chief executive: Kazuyoshi Tada
- Website: Tokyo Bay City Bus(in Japanese)

The Tokyo Bay City Koutsu Co., Ltd. (東京ベイシティ交通株式会社, Tokyo Bay City Koutsu Kabushiki gaisya) is a Keisei Group bus company that once existed in Urayasu City, Chiba Prefecture. The company was founded in 1976 by the Oriental Land Company. It was jointly owned by the Keisei Group and Oriental Land Co., Ltd. Currently, it is the Keisei Bus Chiba West Chidori Office.

== History ==
- On 12 November 1976, the company was established as a wholly owned subsidiary of the Oriental Land Company and the Oriental Land Transport Co., Ltd.
- On 1 April 1977 the company commenced operating route No.1 between Urayasu Station Iriguchi and Maihama Shako.
- On 1 December 1988 the Keiyo Line was partially opened between Minami-Funabashi Station and Shin-Kiba Station. The company established new bus routes and bus stops at Maihama Station and Shin-Urayasu Station.
- On 1 August 1989 the company was renamed Tokyo Bay City Koutsu following its acquisition by Keisei Electric Railway.
- On 4 April 1996 the original Urayasu Terminal closed, replaced by Urayasu Station bus stop in front of Urayasu Station.

== Office ==
- Chidori office

== Routes ==
=== Highway Buses ===
Name	Starting	Via	Terminus	Note
Narita Airport - Tokyo Disney Resort Line	Narita Airport	Tokyo Disney Resort	Disney Ambassador Hotel and so on Disney Official Hotel	You don't have to reserve the bus which goes to Narita Airport from Tokyo Disney Resort and Tokyo Disney Resort Disney from Narita Airport but you are able to reserve the bus which goes to Narita Airport from Disney Ambassador Hotel and so on Disney Official Hotel
Haneda Airport - Tokyo Disney Resort Line	Haneda Airport	Tokyo Disney Resort	Disney Ambassador Hotel and so on Disney Official Hotel	You don't have to reserve the bus which goes to Haneda Airport from Tokyo Disney Resort and Tokyo Disney Resort Disney from Haneda Airport but you are able to reserve the seats of buses which goed to Haneda Airport from Disney Ambassador Hotel and Disney Official Hotel.
Narita Airport - Shin-Urayasu Line	Narita Airport	Shin-Urayasu Station	Tokyo Bay Tokyu Hotel → Mitsui Garden Hotel Prana Tokyo Bay	You don't have to reserve the bus.
Narita Airport - Shin-Urayasu Line	Tokyo Bay Tokyu Hotel → Mitsui Garden Hotel Prana Tokyo Bay	Shin-Urayasu Station	Narita Airport	You can reserve the bus when you ride from each hotels.
Haneda Airport - Shin-Urayasu Line	Haneda Airport	Shin-Urayasu Station	Mitsui Garden Hotel Prana Tokyo Bay	You have to reserve the bus when you ride from Haneda Airport.
Haneda Airport - Shin-Urayasu Express Line	Shione No Machi	Shin-Urayasu Station	Haneda Airport	The route runs on only one-way the bus goes to Haneda Airport from Shione No Machi.
Tokyo・Akihabara - Tokyo Disney Resort・Shin-Urayasu Line	Akihabara Station・Tokyo Station	Tokyo Disney Resort・Akemi 4 chome（Meikai University）	Hinode 7 chome	Passengers don't have to reserve the seat of buses.
Tokyo・Akihabara - Shin-Urayasu Line	Akihabara Station・Tokyo Station	Benten-Daini（Tokyo Disney Sea）・Akemi 4 chome（Meikai University）	Hinode 7 chome	Passengers don't have to reserve the seat of buses.
Tokyo・Akihabara - Shin-Urayasu Line	Yurakucho Station→Tokyo Station	Benten-Daini（Tokyo Disney Sea）・Akemi 4 chome（Meikai University）	Hinode 7 chome	Passengers don't have to reserve the seat of buses.

=== Route Buses ===
- Maihama Station - Urayasu Station (Chiba)
- Maihama Station - Shin-Urayasu Station
- Maihama Station - Minami-Gyotoku Station
- Shin-Urayasu Station - Minami-Gyotoku Station

== See also ==
- Keisei Transit Bus
- Keisei Bus
- Kanto Railway
  - Kantetsu Green Bus
- Kominato Railway
