= Minami-Gyōtoku Station =

Metro station in Ichikawa, Chiba Prefecture, Japan

Minami-gyotoku Station 南行徳駅

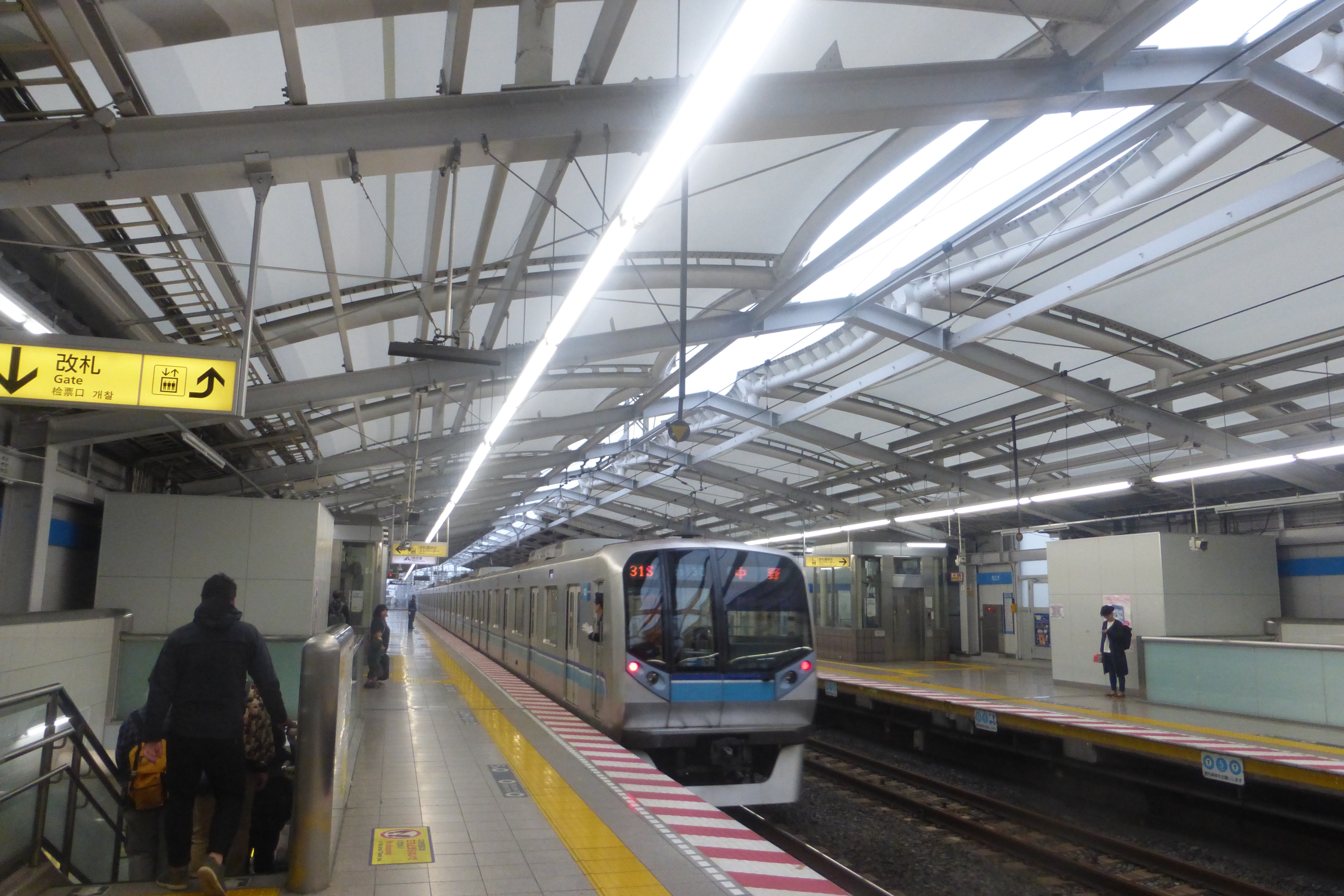
- Platforms of Minami-gyotoku Station, 2017

General information
- Location: 4-17-1 Ainokawa, Ichikawa-shi, Chiba-ken 272–0143; Japan
- Coordinates: 35.672714°N 139.902271°E
- Operator: Tokyo Metro
- Line: Tōzai Line
- Distance: 24.0 km (14.9 mi) from Nakano
- Platforms: 2 side platforms
- Tracks: 2

Construction
- Structure type: Elevated

Other information
- Station code: T-19
- Website: Official website

History
- Opened: 27 March 1981; 45 years ago

Passengers
- FY2019: 53,769

Services
Preceding station	Tokyo Metro	Following station
Urayasu towards Nakano	Tōzai Line Local	Gyōtoku towards Nishi-Funabashi
Location
- Location within Special wards of Tokyo Location within Tokyo Bay and Bōsō Peninsula Location within Chiba Prefecture Location within Japan

Minami-gyōtoku Station (南行徳駅, Minami-gyōtoku-eki) is an above-ground railway station on the Tokyo Metro Tōzai Line in the city of Ichikawa, Chiba, Japan, operated by the Tokyo subway operator Tokyo Metro. Its station number is T-19.

== Lines ==
Minami-gyōtoku Station is served by the Tokyo Metro Tōzai Line, and is 24.0 kilometers (14.9 mi) from the terminus of the line at Nakano.

== Station layout ==
This station consists of two elevated side platforms.

=== Platforms ===
1	Tōzai Line	for Nishi-Funabashi; Chuo-Sobu Line for Tsudanuma; Toyo Rapid Railway Line for Tōyō-Katsutadai
2	Tōzai Line	for Tōyōchō, Ōtemachi, and Nakano; Chuo-Sobu Line for Mitaka

== History ==
The station was opened by Teito Rapid Transit Authority as an infill station on the Tokyo Metro Tōzai Line on 27 March 1981.

The station facilities were inherited by Tokyo Metro after the privatization of the Teito Rapid Transit Authority (TRTA) in 2004.

== Passenger statistics ==
In fiscal year 2019, the station was used by an average of 53,769 passengers daily (boarding passengers only).

== Bus routes ==
- Tokyo Bay City Bus
  - For Shin-Urayasu Station and Maihama Station
- Keisei Bus
  - For Mizue Station, Edogawa Sport Land
  - For Shin-Urayasu Station
- Ichikawa City Community Bus
  - For Chiba Museum of Science and Industry Media Park Ichikawa via Myoden Station and Gyotoku Station
  - For Tokyo Bay Medical Center

== See also ==
- List of railway stations in Japan
