= Maihama Station =

Railway station in Urayasu, Chiba Prefecture, Japan

JE07 Maihama Station 舞浜駅
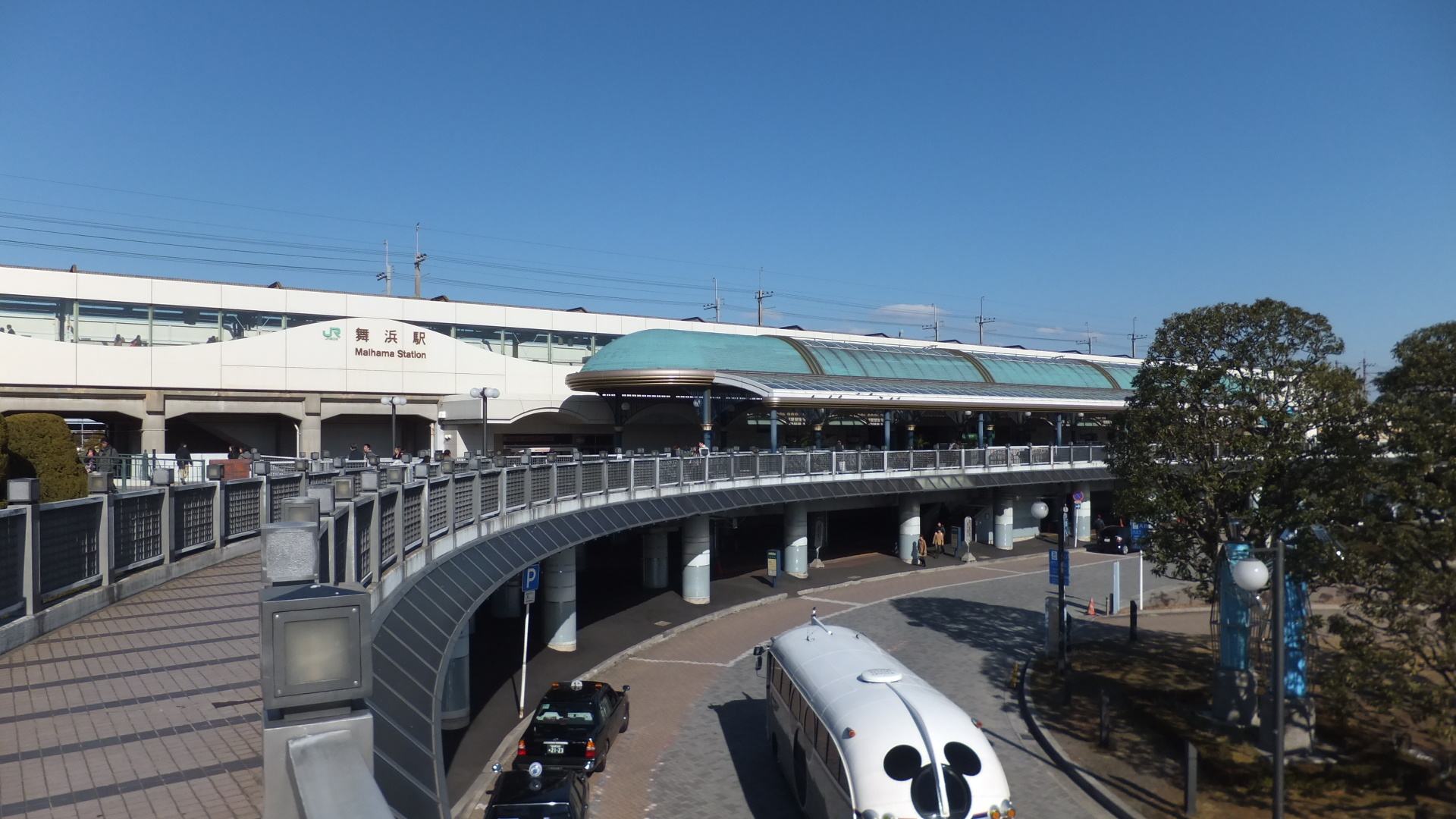
- Station building, February 2012

General information
- Location: Maihama; Urayasu, Chiba; Japan
- Coordinates: 35°38′10″N 139°53′02″E
- Operator: JR East
- Distance: 12.7 km (7.9 mi) from Tokyo
- Platforms: 1 island platform
- Tracks: 2
- Connections: Bus terminal

Construction
- Structure type: Elevated
- Accessible: Yes

Other information
- Status: Staffed (Midori no Madoguchi)
- Station code: JE07

History
- Opened: 1 December 1988

Passengers
- FY2024: 79,403 daily

Services
Preceding station	JR East	Following station
Shin-Kiba JE05 towards Tokyo	Keiyō Line Rapid	Shin-Urayasu JE08 towards Soga
Kasai-Rinkai Park JE06 towards Tokyo	Keiyō Line Local	Shin-Urayasu JE08 towards Soga
Kasai-Rinkai Park JE06 towards Tokyo	Musashino Line Keiyō Line through-service	Shin-Urayasu JE08 towards Fuchūhommachi
Location
- Location within Tokyo Keiyo area Location within Chiba Prefecture Location within Japan

Maihama Station (Japanese: 舞浜駅, Hepburn: Maihama-eki) is a railway station in Urayasu, Chiba, Japan, operated by East Japan Railway Company (JR East). It is most well known for being the main railway access point for Tokyo Disney Resort.

== Lines ==
The station is served by the Keiyō Line from Tokyo, and also by Musashino Line services to and from Fuchūhommachi.

== Station layout ==
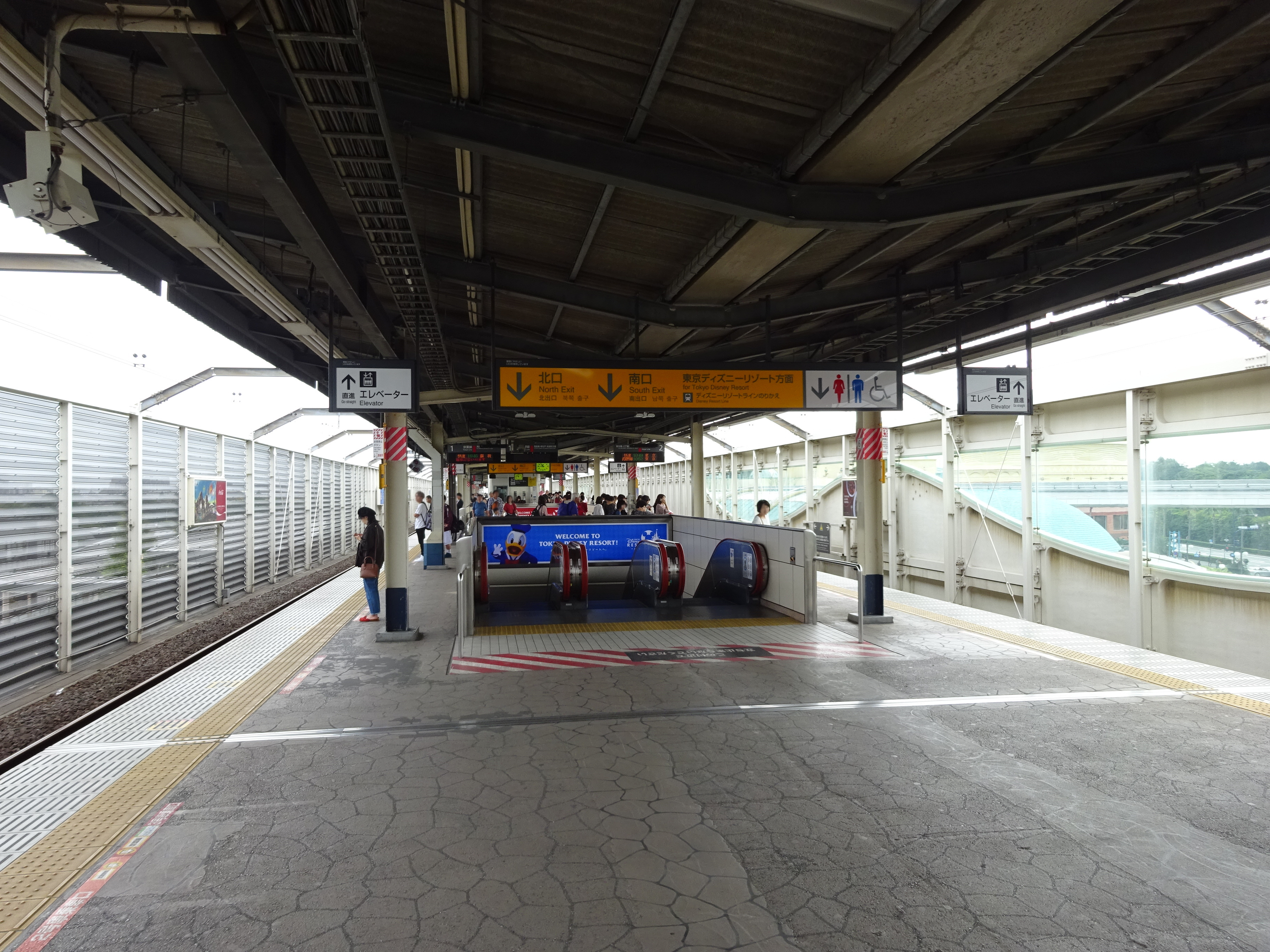
View of the platforms, September 2017

The station has a Midori no Madoguchi staffed ticket office. The station consists of a single elevated platform serving two tracks.

=== Platforms ===
1	Keiyō Line	for Kaihimmakuhari, Soga, Kimitsu, and Kazusa-Ichinomiya
1	Musashino Line through service	for Nishi-Funabashi and Shim-Matsudo
2	Keiyō Line	for Shin-Kiba and Tokyo

=== Disney Resort Line ===
Resort Gateway Station of the Disney Resort Line is a short walk away outside the station.

== History ==
The station opened on 1 December 1988.

Station numbering was introduced in 2016 with Maihama being assigned station number JE07.

The platforms were extended by a total of about 90 meters (300 ft) in January 2021 with work starting in April 2020. The platform extension opened for service on 29 January 2022. In the new configuration, trains stop towards the back of the platform relative to their direction.

== Passenger statistics ==
In fiscal 2013, the station was used by an average of 76,495 passengers daily (boarding passengers only), making it the 58th-busiest station operated by JR East. The daily average passenger figures (boarding passengers only) in previous years are as shown below.

Fiscal year	Daily average
1999	41,177
2000	49,760
2001	59,793
2002	60,575
2003	62,812
2004	63,056
2005	62,520
2006	64,114
2007	64,789
2008	68,768
2009	66,502
2010	64,628
2011	63,898
2012	68,751
2013	76,495

== Bus routes ==
There is a bus terminal in front of the station.

Bus stop	Route no.	Via	Destination	Company
1	12	Resort Hotel; Tokyo DisneySea	Urayasu Station	Tokyo Bay City Bus
1	25	Takasu Kaihin Koen; Bay Park	Sogo Koen	Tokyo Bay City Bus
1	37	Non stop	Tokyo DisneySea	Tokyo Bay City Bus
2	2	Shin-Urayasu Station	Urayasu Station	Tokyo Bay City Bus
2	4	Horie-higashi	Urayasu Station	Tokyo Bay City Bus
2	8	Maihama Station; Oriental Land; Tokyo DisneySea	Urayasu Station	Tokyo Bay City Bus
2	14	Benten; Tomioka	Shin-Urayasu Station	Tokyo Bay City Bus
2	23	Nozomi no Machi	Sogo Koen	Tokyo Bay City Bus
3	6	Tokaidai Urayasu High School	Urayasu Station (Chiba)	Tokyo Bay City Bus
3	9	Fujimi 3chome	Urayasu Station (Chiba)	Tokyo Bay City Bus
3	37	Toyouke Jinja	Minami-Gyotoku Station	Tokyo Bay City Bus
4	20	Oriental Land; Chidori Shako·Clean Center·Chidori-nishi	Maihama Station	Tokyo Bay City Bus
4	Osampo Bus Maihama Line	Horie Junior High school; Urayasu City Hall	Shin-Urayasu Station	Tokyo Bay City Bus

=== Tokyo Disneyland Bus Terminal ===
It takes about 5 minutes from Maihama Station to the bus terminal.

The terminal which are named Bus Terminal East and Bus Terminal West. Bus Terminal East is located near the entrance of Tokyo Disneyland and Maihama Station, and is chiefly used by bus companies of Keisei Group, which are Keisei Bus and Tokyo Bay City Bus and Keisei Transit Bus, is passed through by bus routes which are bound for vicinities, highway buses and airport buses which are bound for Haneda Airport and Narita Airport in additional to shuttle buses which are bound for Tokyo Disney resort partner hotels operated by Daishinto and Keisei Transit Bus. Besides, Bus Terminal WEST' is located west of main entrance. And, the terminal's arrivals and departures are shuttle buses which are bound for Tokyo Disney resort good neighbor hotels and night buses which are bound for distant places and reservation buses.

Bus Terminal East
Bus stop	NO.	Via	Destination	Company	Note
1	Shinjuku-Tokyo Disney Resort Line	Non stop	Shinjuku Expressway Bus Terminal	Keisei Bus; JR Bus Kanto	
1	Chofu-Tokyo Disney Resort Line	Non stop	Chofu Station (Tokyo)	Keio Bus; Keisei Transit Bus	
1	Kichijoji-Tokyo Disney Resort Line	Non stop	Kichijoji Station	Kanto Bus; Seibu Bus; Keisei Transit Bus; Keisei Bus	
1	Musashi-Urawa·Ikebukuro - Tokyo Disney Resort Line	Ikebukuro Station	Musashi-Urawa Station	Keisei Bus; Keisei Transit Bus; Kokusai Kogyo Bus	
2	Yokohama-Tokyo Disney Resort Line	Non stop	Yokohama Station	Keisei Bus; Keihin Kyuko Bus	
3	Disney Resort Cruiser	Non stop	Disney Ambassador Hotel	Keisei Transit Bus	
4	Shuttle bus	Non stop	Tokyo Disney Celebration Hotel	Keisei Transit Bus	
5	Disney Resort Cruiser	Non stop	Tokyo Bay Maihama Hotel First Resort	Keisei Transit Bus	
6	Shuttle bus	Non stop	Mitsui Garden Hotel Prana Tokyo Bay	Keisei Transit Bus	
6	Shuttle bus	Non stop	Hotel Emion Tokyo Bay	Keisei Transit Bus	
7	Shuttle bus	Non stop	Oriental Hotel Tokyo Bay	Keisei Transit Bus	
7	Shuttle bus	Non stop	Urayasu Brighton Hotel	Keisei Transit Bus	
8	Narita Airport Line	Non stop	Narita Airport	Airport Transport Service; Tokyo Bay City Bus; Chiba Kotsu	
8	Haneda Airport Line	Non stop	Haneda Airport	Keisei Bus; Airport Transport Service; Keihin Kyuko Bus; Tokyo Bay City Bus	
9	Tokyo Disney Resort-Tsukuba·Tsuchiura Line	Tsukuba Station	Tsuchiura Station	Kanto Railway	
9	Tokyo Disney Resort-Kashimajingu Line	Suigō-Itako Bus Terminal	Kashima-Jingu Station	Kanto Railway	
9	Tokyo Disney Resort-Mito Line	Ishioka Station·Akatsuka Station (Ibaraki)	Mito Station (Ibaraki)	Kanto Railway	
9	Tokyo Disney Resort-Hitachi Line	Shintanakauchi·Hitachi-Taga Station	Hitachi Station	Ibaraki Kotsu; Keisei Transit Bus	
9	Tokyo Disney Resort-Iwaki Line	Kita-Ibaraki IC	Iwaki Station (Fukushima)	Shinjoban Kotsu; Keisei Transit Bus	
9	Tokyo Disney Resort-Ryuo Line	Kofu Station	Ryuo Station	Chiba Kotsu	
9	Tokyo Disney Resort-Kawagoe Line	Omiya Station (Saitama)·Kawagoe Station	Honkawagoe Station	Tobu Bus West; Keisei Transit Bus	
10	Narita Airport Line	Kamata Station (Tokyo)	Kawasaki Station	Keihin Kyuko Bus; Keisei Bus	
10	Haneda Airport Line	Non stop	Tama Plaza Station	Keisei Bus; Tokyu Bus	
11	Skytree Shuttle	Kinshicho Station	Tokyo Skytree	Keisei Bus; Tobu Bus Central	
11	Akihabara-Tokyo Disney Resort Line	Tokyo Station	Akihabara Station	Keisei Bus; JR Bus Kanto; Tokyo Bay City Bus	
11	Matsudo-Tokyo Disney Resort Line	Non stop	Matsudo Station	Keisei Bus; Matsudo Shinkeisei Bus	
12	[4]	Maihama Station·Oriental Land	Urayasu Station (Chiba)	Tokyo Bay City Bus	
12	[8]	Maihama Station·Oriental Land·Tokyo DisneySea	Urayasu Station (Chiba)	Tokyo Bay City Bus	
12	Shuttle Seven[SS07]·[SS08]·[SS09]	Non stop	Tokyo DisneySea	Keisei Bus	
12	Shuttle Seven[SS07]	Kasai-Rinkai Park Station·Kasai Station·Ichinoe Station	Koiwa Station	Keisei Bus	
12	Shuttle Seven[SS08]	Kasai-Rinkai Park Station·Kasai Station·Ichinoe Station·Aoto Station	Kameari Station	Keisei Bus	
12	Limited Express[SS09]	Kasai Station·Ichinoe Station	Shin-Koiwa Station	Keisei Bus	
13	Parking Shuttle	Non stop	Extra parking area	Keisei Bus	Operated when the extra parking area is used.

Bus Terminal West - Bus stop No.18 ~ No. 22 - All bus routes are night buses
NO.	Via	Destination	Company	Note
Dream Aomori·Tokyo	Non stop	Aomori Station	JR Bus Tohoku	
Dream Akita·Tokyo	Akita Station·Akita University	Akita Port Tower Serion	JR Bus Tohoku	
Dream Morioka	Non stop	Morioka Station	JR Bus Tohoku	
Dream Sendai/Polar Star	Non stop	Sendai Station (Miyagi)	JR Bus Tohoku; Narita Airport Transport	
Dream Sakuranbo	Yamagata Prefectural Hall	Yamagata Station	JR Bus Tohoku	
Yuuhi	Amarume Station·Tsuruoka Station	Sakata Station (Yamagata)	Kokusai Kogyo; Shonai Kotsu	
Dream Fukushima·Tokyo	Koriyama Station (Fukushima)	Fukushima Station (Fukushima)	JR Bus Tohoku	
Yumekaido Aizu	Inawashiro Station	Aizu Wakamatsu Station	JR Bus Kanto	
Nagano Line	Matsumoto Station(Matsumoto Bus Terminal)	Nagano Station	Narita Airport transport Alpico Kotsu	
Yokohama E-liner	Kakegawa Station·Iwata Station (Shizuoka)	Hamamatsu Station	Enshu Bus	
Dream Chita	Chiryu Station·Kariya Station	Otagawa Station	JR Bus Kanto; JR Tokai Bus	
Fantasia Nagoya	Nagoya Inter Bus stop·Hoshigaoka Station (Aichi)·Motoyama Station (Aichi)·Chikusa Station·Sakae Station (Aichi)	Nagoya Station	Keisei Bus; JR Tokai Bus	
Seishun Dream Fukui	Tsuruga Station·Takefu Station·Sabae Station	Fukui Station (Fukui)	JR Bus Kanto	
Seishun Dream Kanazawa	Toyama Station·Kanazawa Station	Kanazawa Institute of Technology	West JR Bus	
Nara Line	Tenri Station·Nara Station·Oji Station (Nara)	Goido Station	Keisei Bus; Nara Kotsu	
Dream	Kyoto Station·Nara Station	Oji Station (Nara)	JR Bus Kanto; West JR Bus	
Kyoto Line	Otsu Station	Kyoto Station	Chiba Chuo Bus	
Dream	Osaka Station O-CAT	Tennoji Station	JR Bus Kanto; West JR Bus	
Dream	Osaka Station	Sannomiya Station	JR Bus Kanto; West JR Bus	
Kobe Line	Osaka-Umeda Station	Kobe-Sannomiya Station	Keisei Bus; Hankyu Bus	
South Wave	Sakaihigashi Station·Sakai Station·Izumigaoka Station·Wakayama Station	Wakayamashi Station	Wakayama Bus; Narita Airport Transport	
Dream Matsuyama	Matsuyama Station (Ehime)	JR Bus Matuyama office	JR Bus Kanto; JR Shikoku Bus	
Dream Takamatsu	Takamatsu Station (Kagawa)	Kannonji Station	JR Bus Kanto; West JR Bus	
Dream Anan·Tokushima	Tokushima Station	Anan Station	JR Bus Kanto; West JR Bus	
Dream Kochi	Tokushima Station·Kochi Station (Kochi)	Harimaya-bashi	JR Bus Kanto; West JR Bus	
Flying Liner/Flying Sneaker	Kyoto Station·Osaka Station	Abenobashi Station	TOHOKU KYUKO BUS; Kintetsu Bus	
Mamakari Liner	Okayama Station	Kurashiki Station	TOHOKU KYUKO BUS; Ryobi Bus	

No.23~25 - Shuttle buses which are bound for TOKYO DISNEY RESORT GOOD NEIGHBOR HOTEL
Bus stop	NO.	Via	Destination	Company	Note
23	Shuttle buses	Non stop	Tobu Hotel Levant Tokyo		
23	Shuttle buses	Non stop	Hotel East 21		
23	Shuttle buses	Non stop	Daiichi Hotel Ryogoku		
24	Shuttle buses	Non stop	Tokyo Bay Ariake Washington		
24	Shuttle buses	Non stop	Hptel New Otani Makuhari		
24	Shuttle buses	Non stop	Keio Plaza Hotel		
25	Shuttle buses	Non stop	Grand Nikko Tokyo Daiba		
25	Shuttle buses	Non stop	Hilton Tokyo Odaiba		
25	Shuttle buses	Non stop	Sotetsu Grand Fresa Tokyo Bay Ariake		
25	Shuttle buses	Non stop	Keisei Miramare		

No.26~28

Reservation Buses

- The bus routes run when busy season and people reserve.

== Surrounding area ==
The station is the main access point of Tokyo Disney Resort. The park gate of Tokyo Disneyland is located a short walk from the station while the Resort Gateway Station of the Disney Resort Line monorail line and the Ikspiari shopping complex are located directly beside the Maihama station gates.

== See also ==
- List of railway stations in Japan
- Rail transport in Walt Disney Parks and Resorts
