= Kita-Sabae Station =

Railway station in Sabae, Fukui Prefecture, Japan

Kita-Sabae Station 北鯖江駅
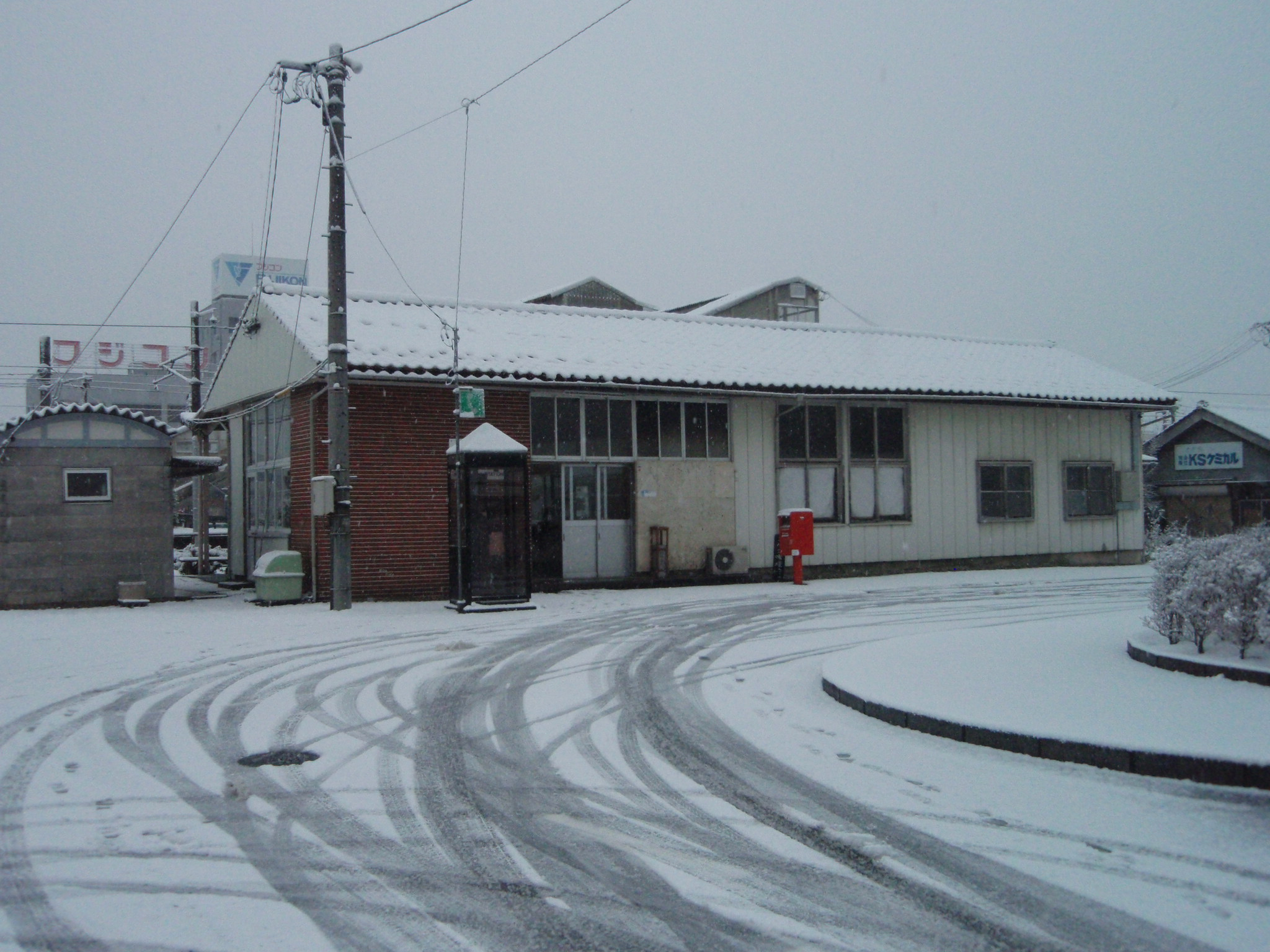
- Kita-Sabae Station in December 2008

General information
- Location: Shimokobata-cho, Sabae-shi, Fukui-ken, 916-0038; Japan
- Coordinates: 35.9715°N 136.1985°E
- Operator: Hapi-Line Fukui
- Line: ■ Hapi-Line Fukui Line
- Distance: 43.5 km from Tsuruga
- Platforms: 1 island platform
- Tracks: 2

Other information
- Status: Unstaffed
- Website: Official website

History
- Opened: 1 May 1955

Passengers
- FY2016: 477 daily
Location
- Location within Japan

Kita-Sabae Station (北鯖江駅, Kitasabae-eki) is a railway station on the Hapi-Line Fukui Line in the city of Sabae, Fukui Prefecture, Japan, operated by the Hapi-Line Fukui.

== Lines ==
Kita-Sabae Station is served by the Hapi-Line Fukui Line, and is located 43.5 kilometers from the terminus of the line at Tsuruga.

== Station layout ==
The station consists of one island platform connected to the station building by a footbridge. The station is unattended.

=== Platforms ===
| 1 | ■ Hapi-Line Fukui Line | for Takefu and Tsuruga |
| 2 | ■ Hapi-Line Fukui Line | for Fukui and Kanazawa |

== Adjacent stations ==
| « | Service | » |
Hapi-Line Fukui Line
Rapid: Does not stop at this station
| Sabae | Local | Ōdoro |

== History ==
Kita-Sabae Station opened on 1 May 1955. With the privatization of Japanese National Railways (JNR) on 1 April 1987, the station came under the control of JR West.

From the start of the revised timetable on 16 March 2024, this station was transferred to the Hapi-Line Fukui Line due to the opening of the western extension of the Hokuriku Shinkansen from Kanazawa to Tsuruga.

== Passenger statistics ==
In fiscal 2016, the station was used by an average of 477 passengers daily (boarding passengers only).

== Surrounding area ==
- Higashibu Industrial Park

== See also ==
- List of railway stations in Japan
