= Baraki-nakayama Station =

Metro station in Funabashi, Chiba Prefecture, Japan

Coordinates: 35.703202°N 139.941879°E

Baraki-nakayama Station 原木中山駅

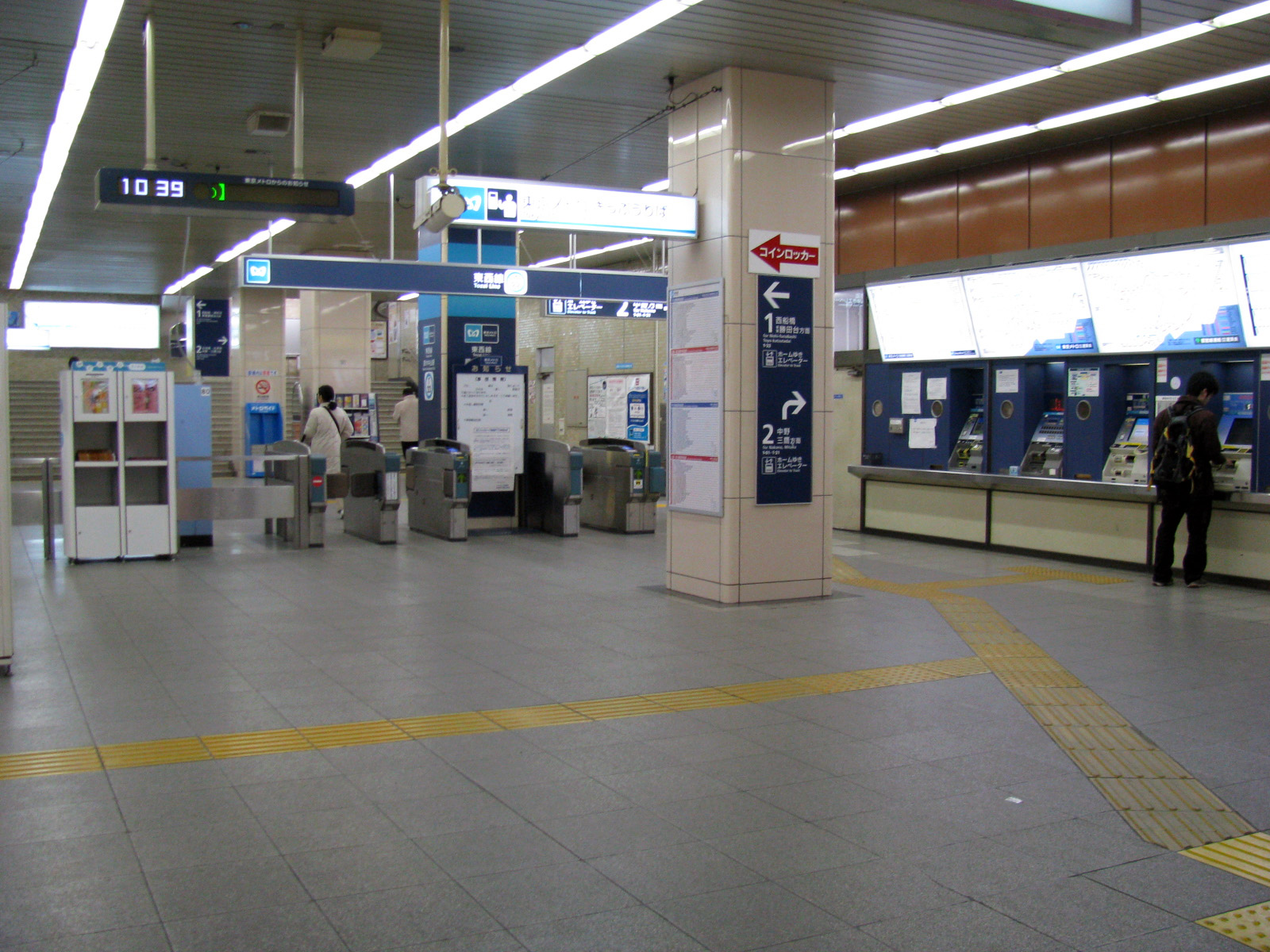
- Ticket barriers at Baraki-nakayama Station.

General information
- Location: 7-7-1 Moto-Nakayama, Funabashi City, Chiba Prefecture; Japan
- Operator: Tokyo Metro
- Line: Tōzai Line
- Platforms: 2 side platforms
- Tracks: 2

Construction
- Structure type: Elevated

Other information
- Station code: T-22

History
- Opened: 29 March 1969; 57 years ago

Services
Preceding station	Tokyo Metro	Following station
Myōden towards Nakano	Tōzai Line Local	Nishi-Funabashi Terminus
Location
- Location within Tokyo Keiyo area Location within Kanto Area Location within Japan

Baraki-nakayama Station (原木中山駅, Baraki-Nakayama-eki) is a railway station on the Tokyo Metro Tozai Line in Funabashi, Chiba, Japan, operated by the Tokyo subway operator Tokyo Metro. Its station number is T-22. The station opened on 29 March 1969.

== Lines ==
- Tokyo Metro Tozai Line

== Station layout ==
This elevated station consists of two elevated side platforms. There are also two center express tracks used for rapid trains that skip this station.

1	Tozai Line	for Nishi-Funabashi; Tōyō Rapid Railway Line for Tōyō-Katsutadai; Sōbu Line (Local) for Tsudanuma
2	Tozai Line	for Otemachi and Nakano; Chūō Line (Local) for Mitaka

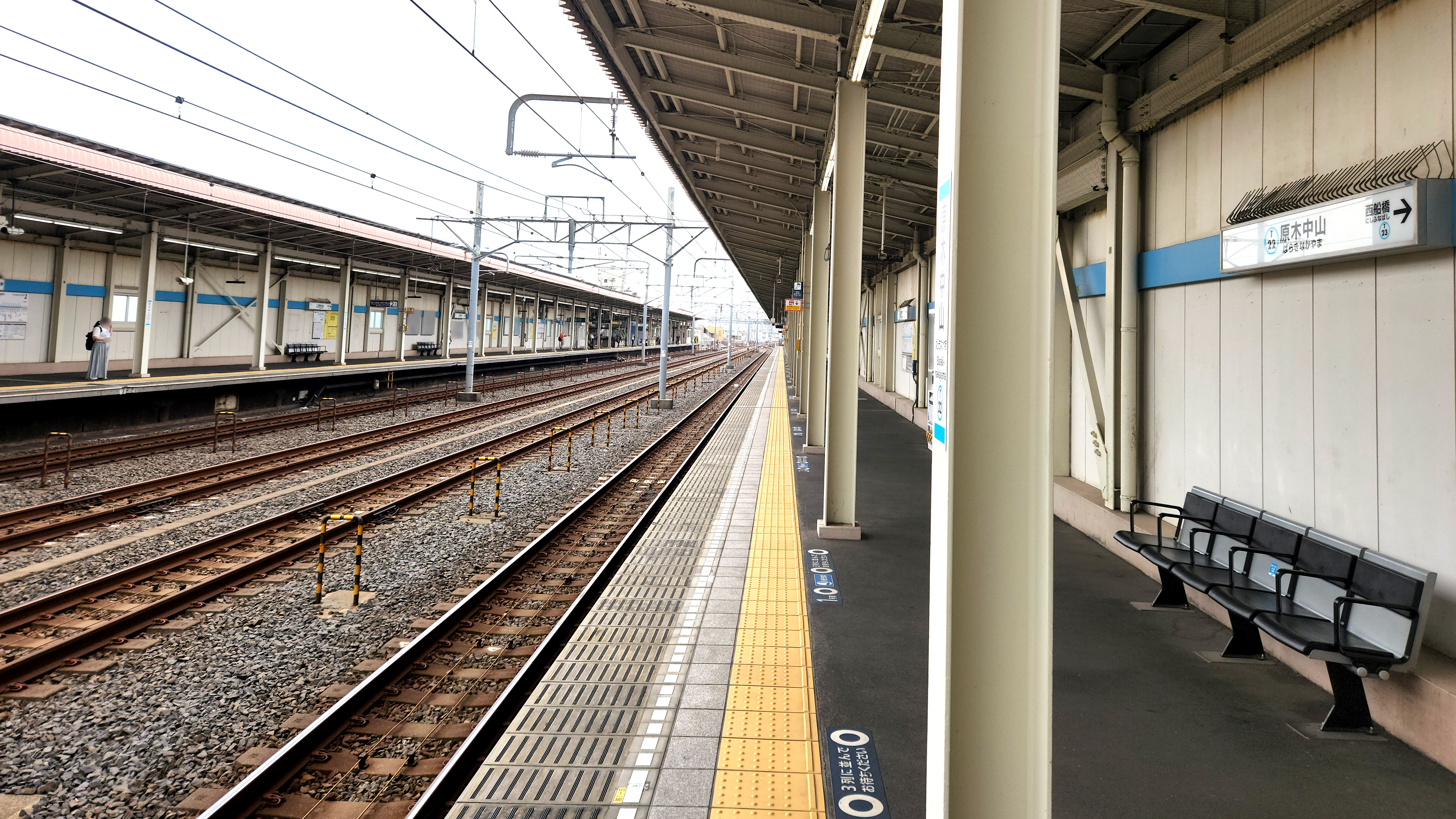
Platforms in July 2022

== History ==
Baraki-Nakayama Station opened on 29 March 1969.

The station facilities were inherited by Tokyo Metro after the privatization of the Teito Rapid Transit Authority (TRTA) in 2004.

== Bus services ==
No.	Via	Destination	Company
二俣01		Futamata-Shinmachi Station	Keisei Transit Bus
二俣01	Ōwadakabuto bashi (Note: Passengers are able to transfer onto 市川02 which is bound for Ichikawa Station)	Motoyawata Station	Keisei Transit Bus
妙典05		Myoden Station	Keisei Transit Bus
妙典05	Ōwadakabuto bashi	Motoyawata Station	Keisei Transit Bus

== See also ==
- List of railway stations in Japan
