= Gyōtoku Station =

Metro station in Ichikawa, Chiba Prefecture, Japan

Gyotoku Station 行徳駅

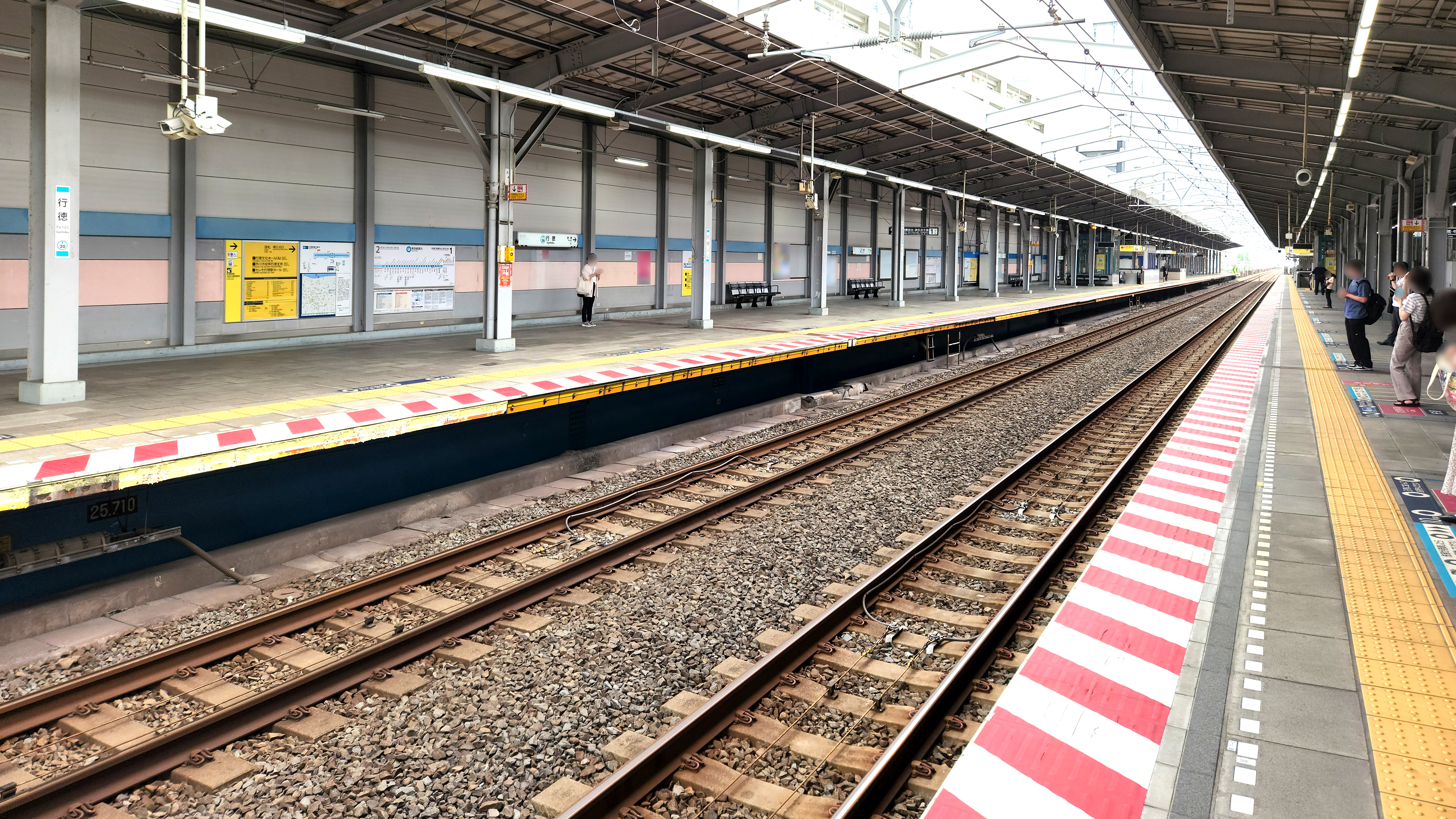
- Platforms and tracks in July 2022.

General information
- Location: 2-4-1 Gyōtoku-ekimae, Ichikawa City, Chiba Prefecture 272-0133; Japan
- Coordinates: 35.682597°N 139.914174°E
- Operator: Tokyo Metro
- Line: Tōzai Line
- Distance: 25.5 km (15.8 mi) from Nakano
- Platforms: 2 island platforms
- Tracks: 2

Construction
- Structure type: Elevated

Other information
- Station code: T-20
- Website: Official website

History
- Opened: 19 March 1969; 57 years ago

Passengers
- FY2019: 57,818 daily

Services
Preceding station	Tokyo Metro	Following station
Minami-gyōtoku towards Nakano	Tōzai Line Local	Myōden towards Nishi-Funabashi
Location
- Location within Tokyo wards area Location within Tokyo Keiyo area Location within Kanto Area Location within Japan

Gyōtoku Station (行徳駅, Gyōtoku-eki) is an above-ground railway station on the Tokyo Metro Tozai Line in the city of Ichikawa, Chiba, Japan, operated by the Tokyo subway operator Tokyo Metro. Its station number is T-20.

== Lines ==
Gyōtoku Station is served by the Tokyo Metro Tozai Line, and is 25.5 kilometers from the terminus of the line at Nakano.

== Station layout ==
This station consists of two elevated island platforms on the third floor ("3F") level serving a total of four tracks.

=== Platforms ===
1	Tozai Line	for Nishi-Funabashi; Chuo-Sobu Line for Tsudanuma; Toyo Rapid Railway Line for Tōyō-Katsutadai
2	Tozai Line	for Toyocho, Otemachi, Nakano; Chuo-Sobu Line for Mitaka

== History ==
The station opened by Teito Rapid Transit Authority on 19 March 1969.

The station facilities were inherited by Tokyo Metro after the privatization of the Teito Rapid Transit Authority (TRTA) in 2004.

== Passenger statistics ==
In fiscal 2019, the station was used by an average of 57,818 passengers daily (boarding passengers only).

Fiscal year	Daily average
2011	52,708
2012	52,899
2013	54,539
2014	54,792
2015	56,064
2016	57,149
2017	58,256
2018	58,627

== See also ==
- List of railway stations in Japan
