= Ichikawashiohama Station =

Railway station in Ichikawa, Chiba Prefecture, Japan

JE09 Ichikawashiohama Station 市川塩浜駅
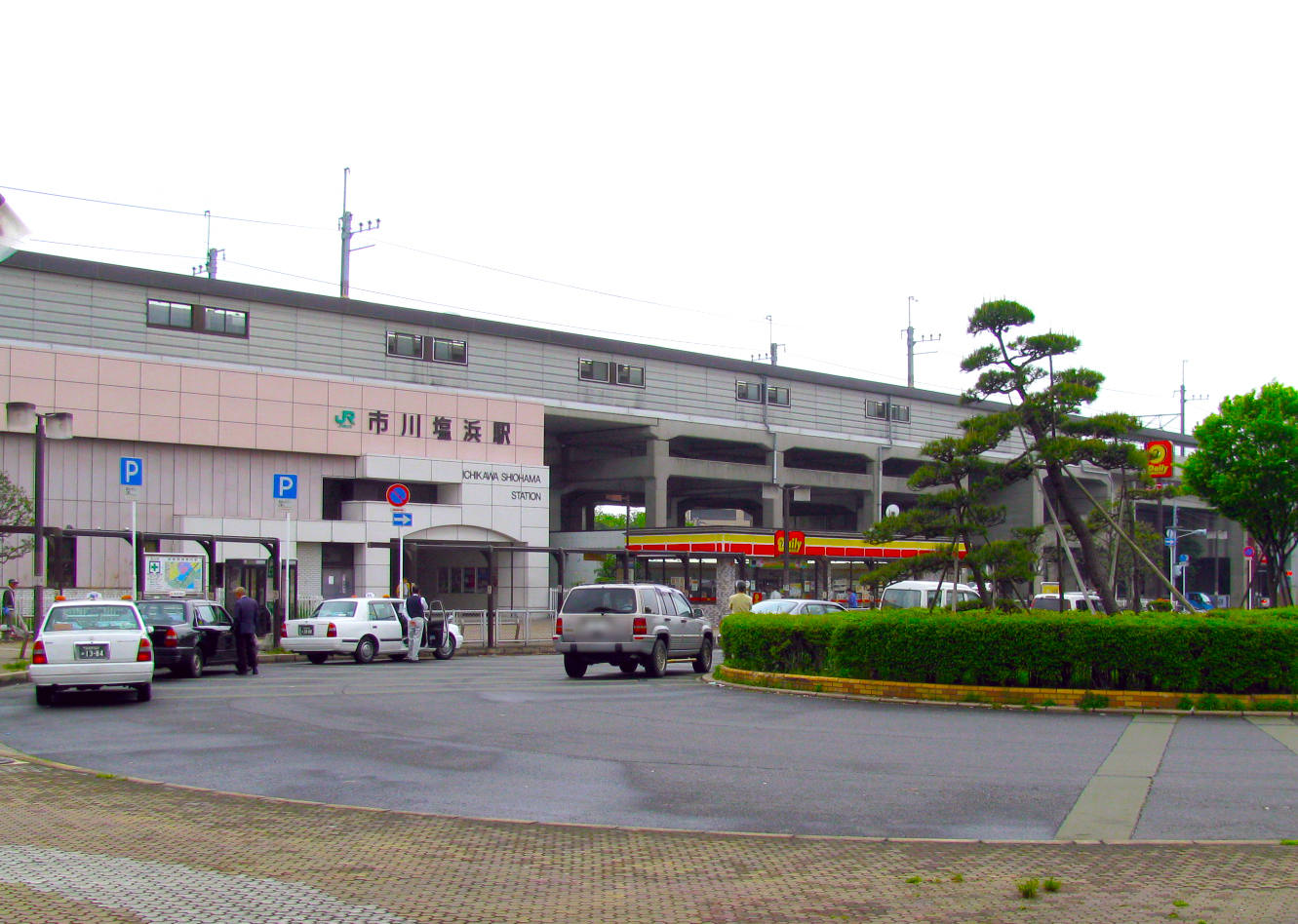
- Station forecourt on north side, May 2008

General information
- Location: 2 Shiohama; Ichikawa, Chiba; Japan
- Coordinates: 35°40′00″N 139°55′25″E
- Operator: JR East
- Lines: Keiyō Line; Kōya Branch (Musashino Line)
- Distance: 18.2 km (11.3 mi) from Tokyo
- Platforms: 2 side platforms
- Tracks: 2
- Connections: Bus terminal

Construction
- Structure type: Elevated
- Accessible: Yes

Other information
- Status: Staffed
- Station code: JE09
- Website: Website

History
- Opened: 1 December 1988

Passengers
- FY2019: 8,086 daily

Services
Preceding station	JR East	Following station
Shin-Urayasu JE08 towards Tokyo	Keiyō Line Local	Futamatashimmachi JE10 towards Soga
Shin-Urayasu JE08 towards Tokyo	Musashino Line Keiyō Line through-service	Nishi-Funabashi JM10 towards Fuchūhommachi
Location
- Location within Tokyo Keiyo area Location within Chiba Prefecture Location within Japan

Ichikawashiohama Station (市川塩浜駅, Ichikawa-Shiohama-eki) is a passenger railway station in the city of Ichikawa, Chiba, Japan, operated by East Japan Railway Company (JR East).

== Lines ==
Ichikawashiohama Station is served by the Keiyo Line between Tokyo and Soga, and also by Musashino Line through services between Tokyo and Fuchūhommachi. The station is located 18.2 km (11.3 mi) from the western terminus of the line at Tokyo Station.

== Station layout ==
Station track layout

The elevated station consists of two side platforms serving two tracks. The station is staffed. Both platforms have lift access, and wheelchair-accessible toilet facilities are available on the ground floor.

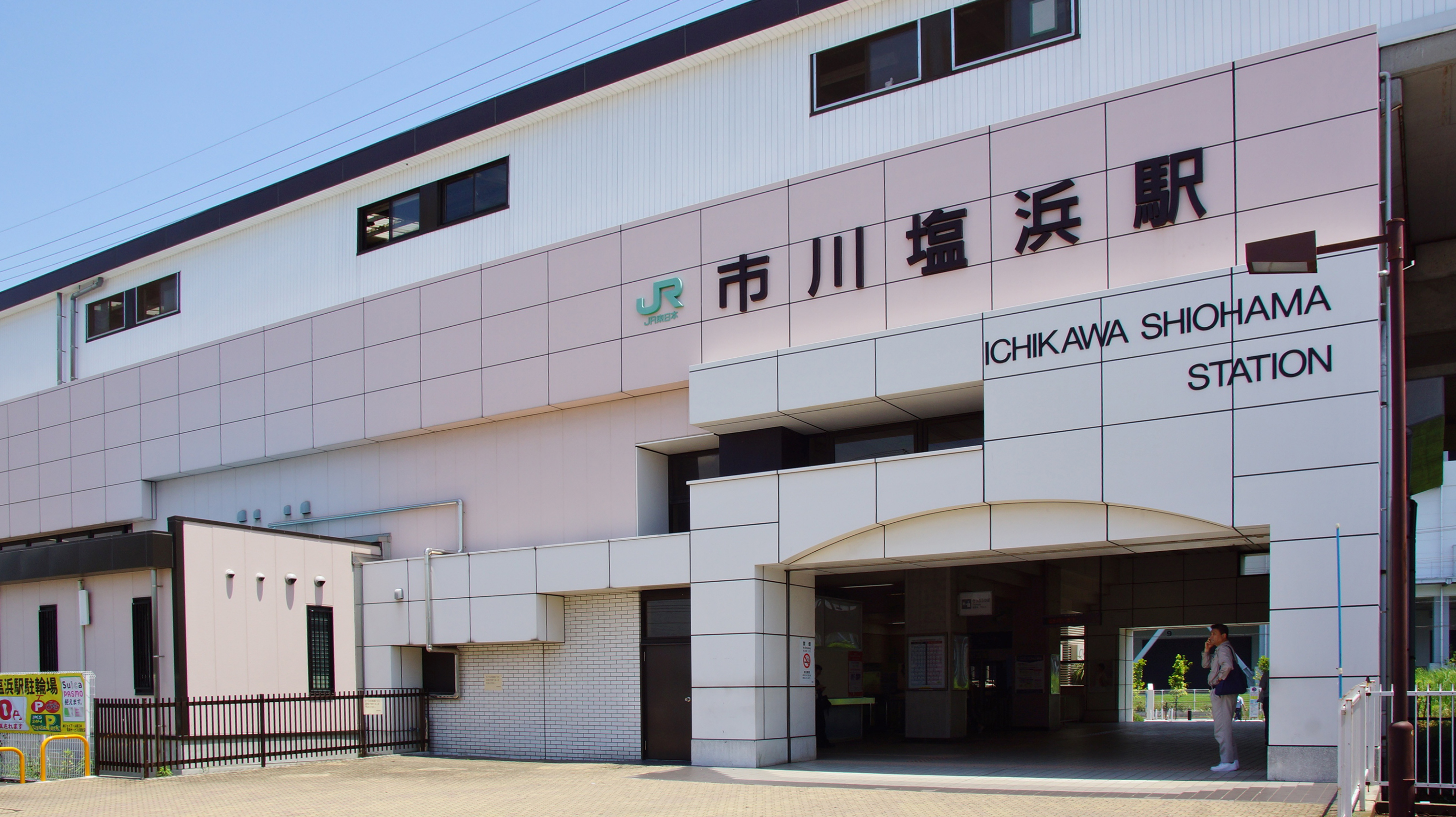
The north entrance, July 2014

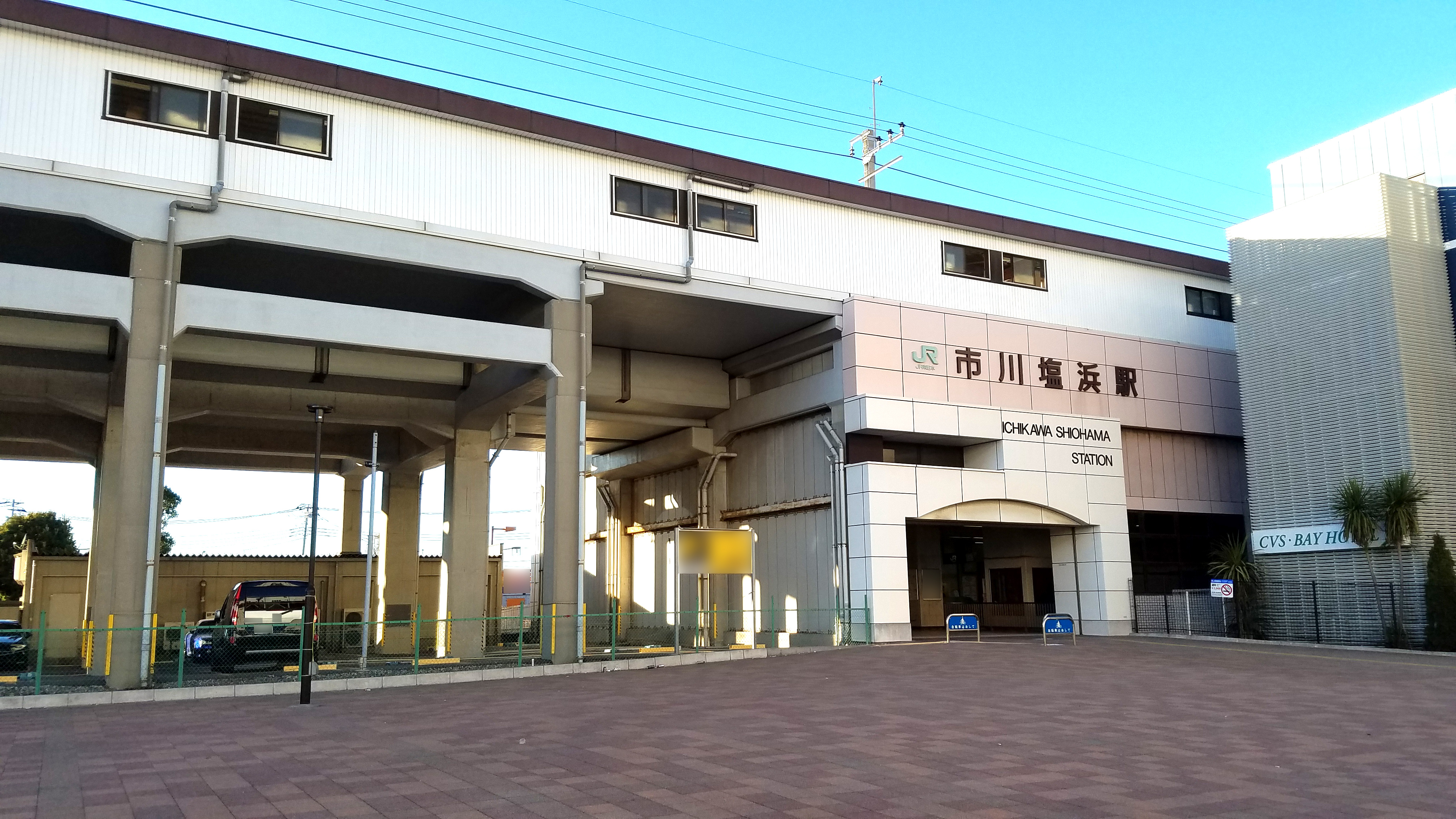
The south entrance, January 2022

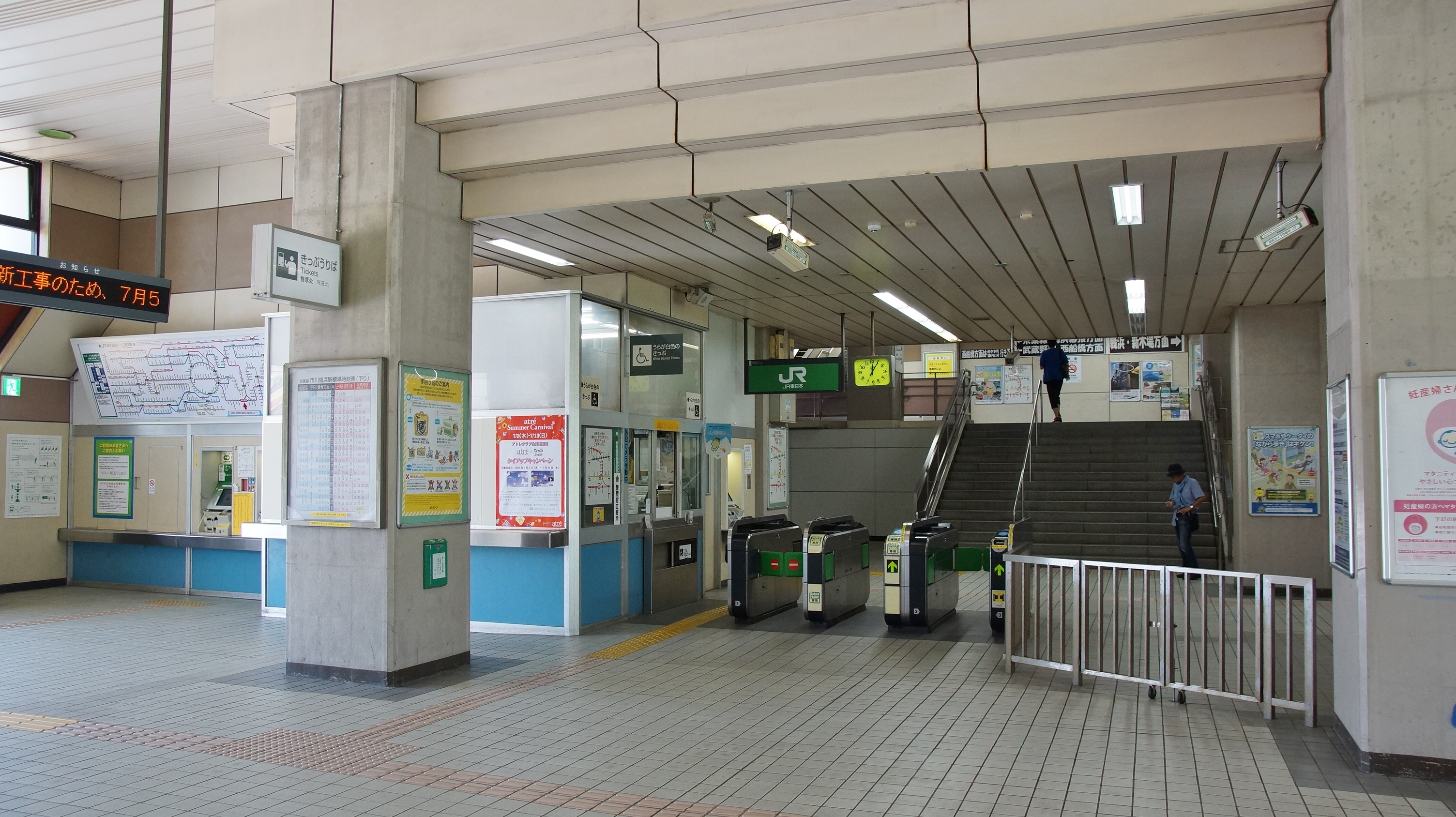
The ticket vending machines and ticket barriers, July 2014

=== Platforms ===
1	Keiyō Line	for Minami-Funabashi, Kaihimmakuhari, and Soga
1	Musashino Line through service	for Nishi-Funabashi, Shim-Matsudo, and Fuchūhommachi
2	Keiyō Line	for Maihama, Shin-Kiba, and Tokyo

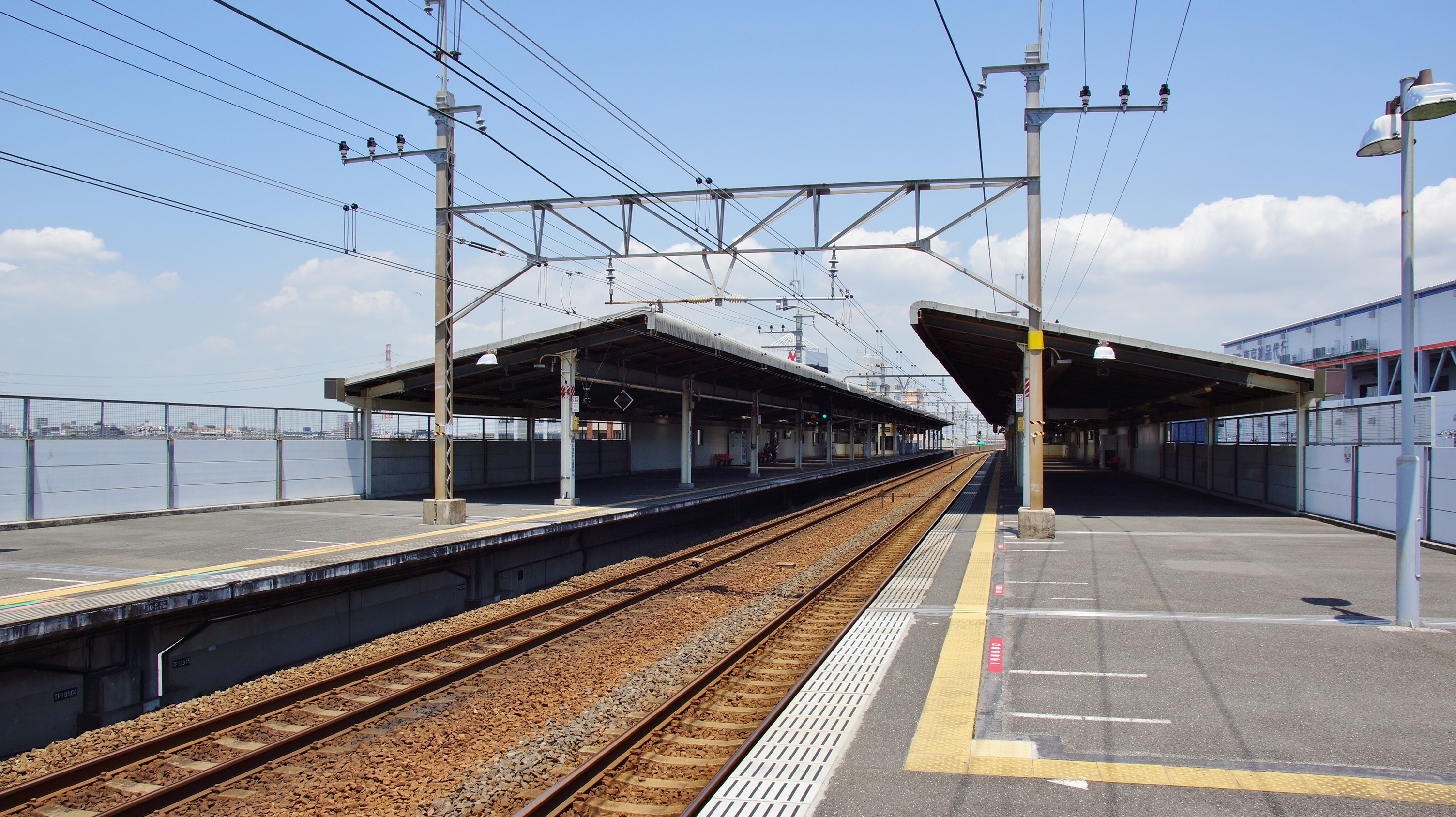
View from the up (Tokyo) end of platform 2, July 2014

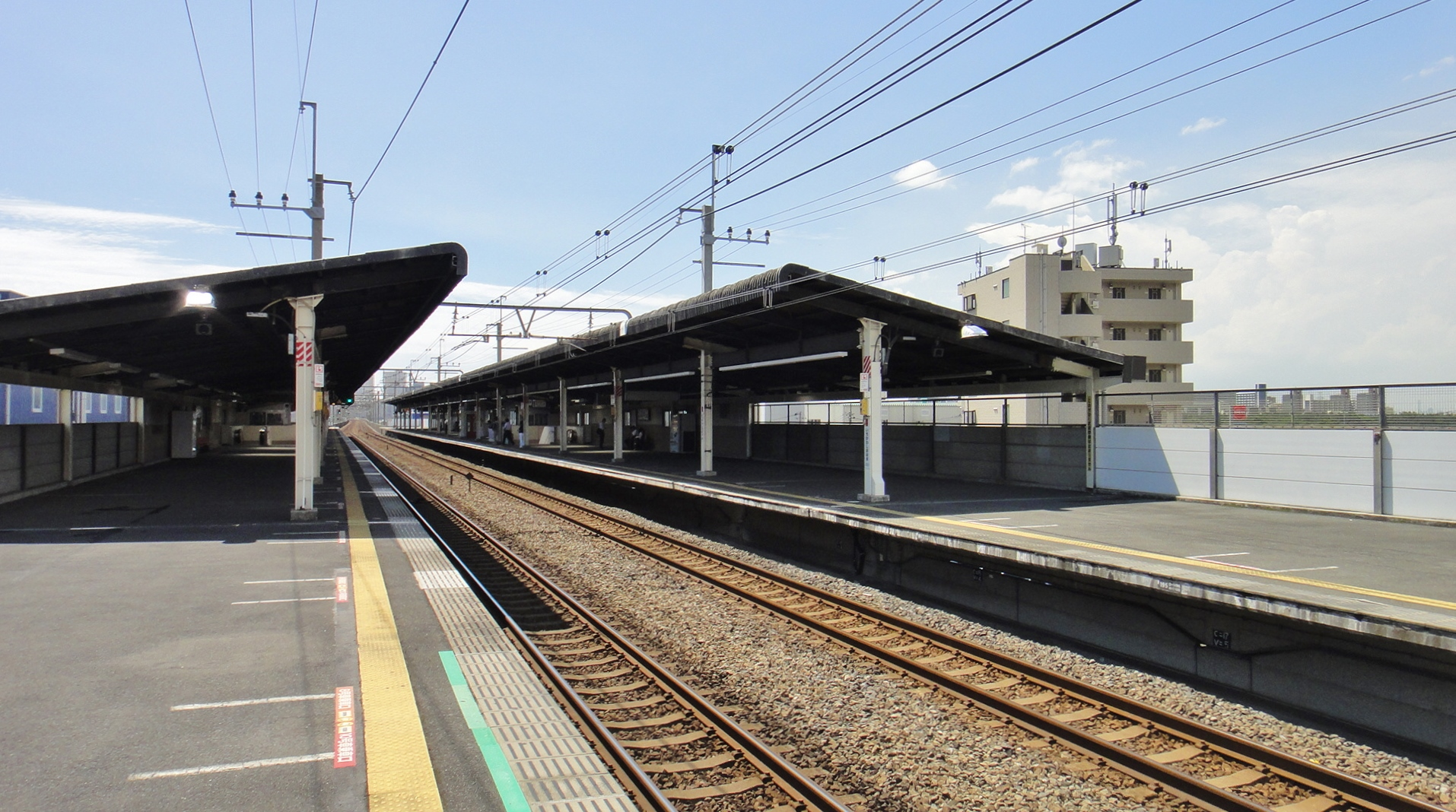
View from the down end of platform 2, September 2012

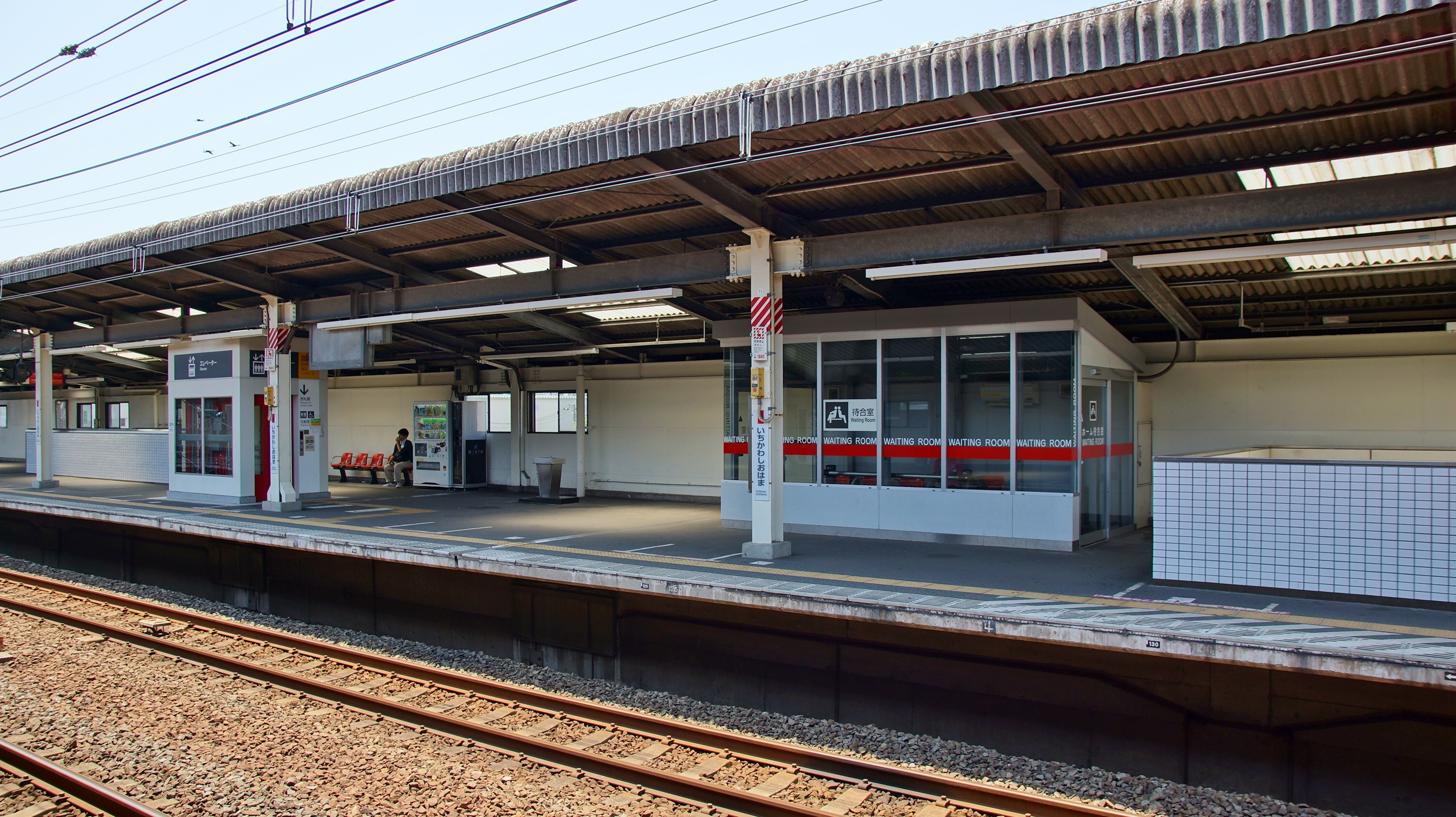
The passenger waiting room and lift on platform 1, July 2014

== History ==
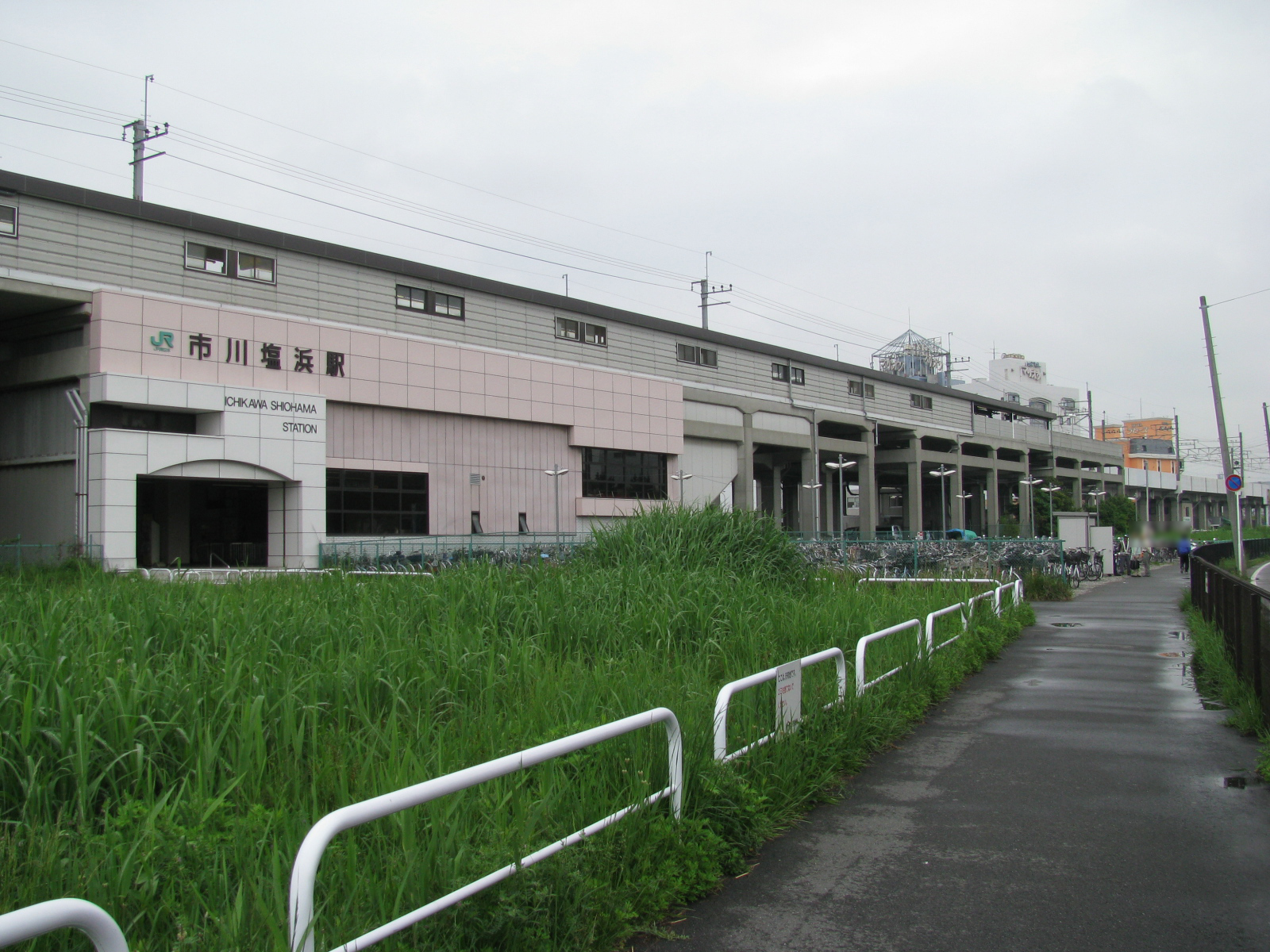
The south side of the station in May 2008 before the construction of the CVS Bay Hotel and convenience store

The station opened on 1 December 1988.

Station numbering was introduced in 2016 Ichikawashiohama being assigned station number JE09.

== Passenger statistics ==
In fiscal 2019, the station was used by an average of 8,086 passengers daily (boarding passengers only). The passenger figures for previous years are as shown below.

Fiscal year	Daily average
2000	3,907
2005	4,696
2010	6,047
2015	7,546

== Surrounding area ==
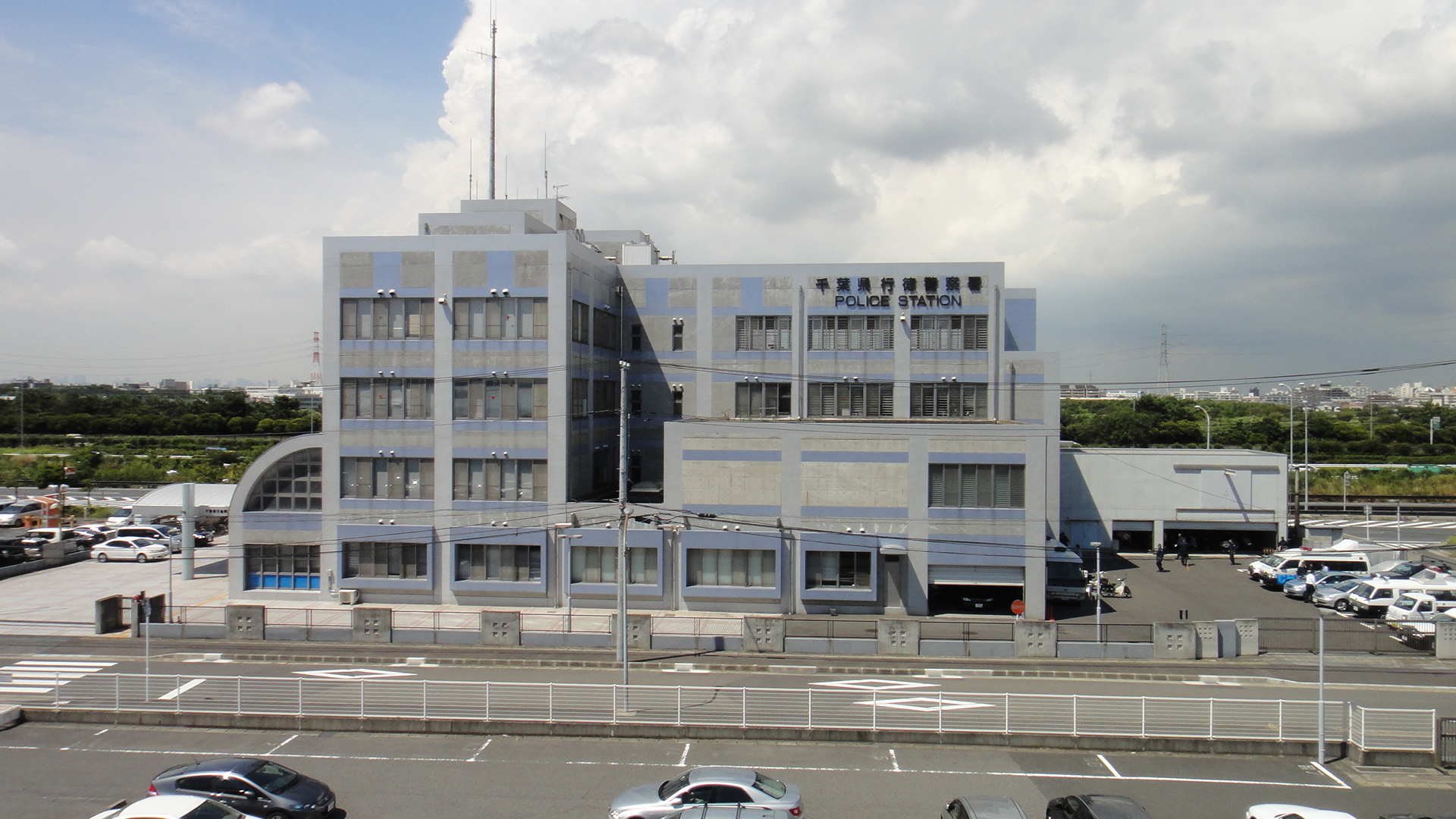
Gyotoku Police Station viewed from the station platform, September 2012

- Gyōtoku Police Station
- National Route 357
- Ichikawa Wild Bird Haven (市川野鳥の楽園, Ichikawa Yachō no Rakuen)
- Shiohama No. 1 Park
- Higashi Kaimen Park

=== Schools ===
- Gyotoku High School
- Shiohama Junior High School
- Minami-Gyotoku Junior High School
- Fukuei Junior High School
- Shiohama Elementary School
- Minami Niihama Elementary School
- Fukuei Elementary School
- Fumihama Elementary School

=== Commercial ===
- Amazon Japan Fulfillment Center

=== Hotels ===
- CVS Bay Hotel

== See also ==
- List of railway stations in Japan
