= Sabae Station =

Railway station in Sabae, Fukui Prefecture, Japan

Sabae Station 鯖江駅
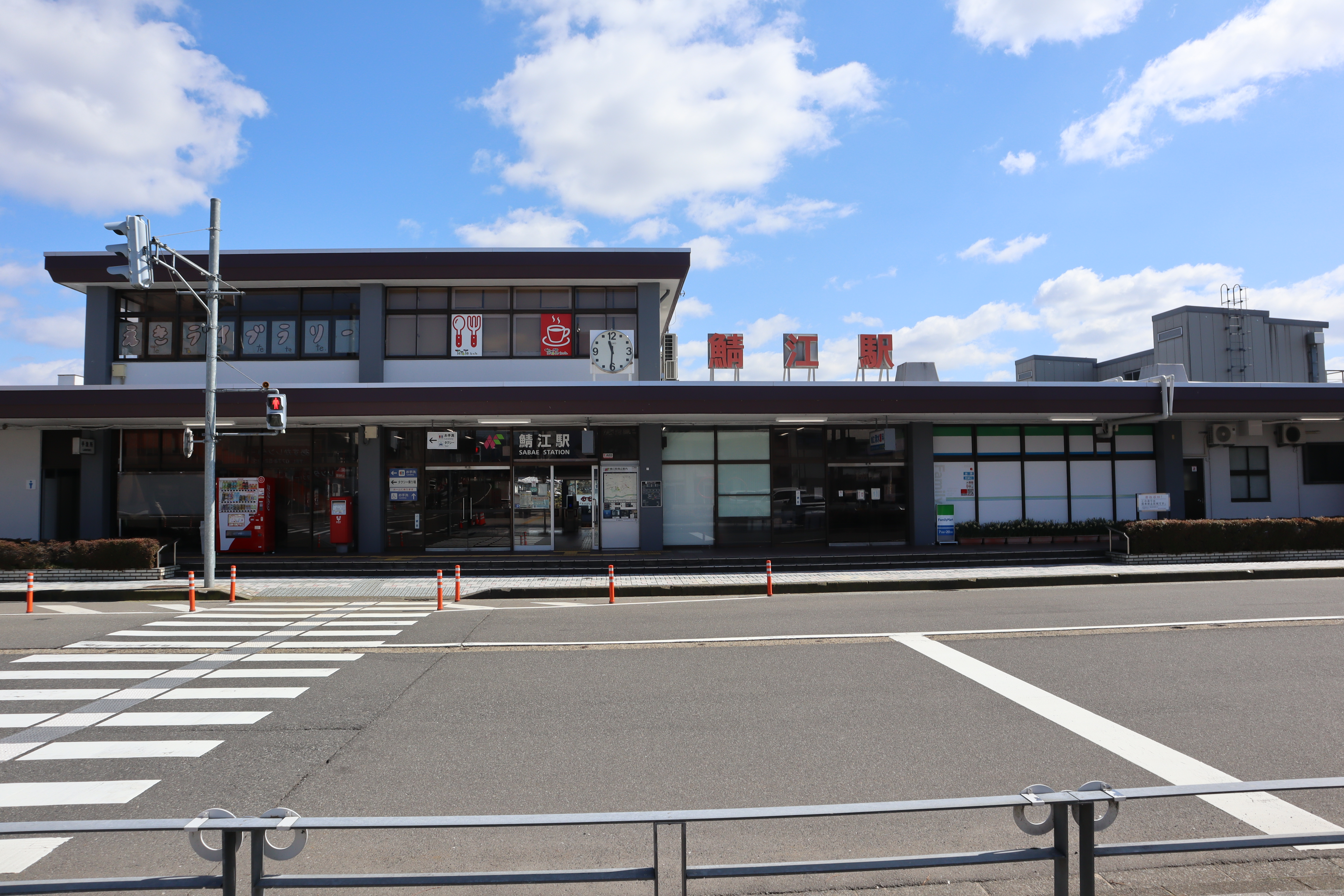
- Sabae Station in March 2025

General information
- Location: 1-2 Hinodechō, Sabae-shi, Fukui-ken, 916-0053; Japan
- Coordinates: 35.943183°N 136.188712°E
- Operator: Hapi-Line Fukui
- Line: Hapi-Line Fukui Line
- Distance: 40.3 km from Tsuruga
- Platforms: 1 side + 1 island platforms
- Tracks: 3

Other information
- Status: Staffed (Midori no Madoguchi)
- Website: Official website

History
- Opened: 15 July 1896

Passengers
- FY2016: 2263 daily

Services
| Preceding station | Hapi-Line Fukui | Following station |
|---|---|---|
| Takefu towards Tsuruga | Hapi-Line Fukui Line Rapid | Fukui Terminus |
| Takefu towards Tsuruga | Hapi-Line Fukui Line Regional Rapid | Kita-Sabae towards Fukui |
| Takefu towards Tsuruga | Hapi-Line Fukui Line Local | Kita-Sabae towards Daishōji |
Location
- Location within Japan

Sabae Station (鯖江駅, Sabae-eki) is a railway station on the Hapi-Line Fukui Line in the neighborhood of Hinodecho, Sabae, Fukui Prefecture, Japan, operated by the Hapi-Line Fukui.

== Lines ==
Sabae Station is served by the Hapi-Line Fukui Line, and is located 40.3 kilometers from the terminus of the line at Tsuruga.

== Station layout ==
The station consists of one side platform and one island platform connected by a footbridge. The station has a Midori no Madoguchi staffed ticket office.

=== Platforms ===
| 1 | ■ Hapi-Line Fukui Line | for Fukui and Kanazawa |
| 2-3 | ■ Hapi-Line Fukui Line | for Takefu and Tsuruga |

== History ==
Sabae Station opened on 15 July 1896. With the privatization of Japanese National Railways (JNR) on 1 April 1987, the station came under the control of JR West.

From the start of the revised timetable on 16 March 2024, the conventional line station was transferred to the Hapi-Line Fukui Line due to the opening of the western extension of the Hokuriku Shinkansen from Kanazawa to Tsuruga.

== Passenger statistics ==
In fiscal 2016, the station was used by an average of 2,263 passengers daily (boarding passengers only).

== Surrounding area ==
- Hirose Hospital
- Site of Sabae Domain jin'ya

== See also ==
- List of railway stations in Japan
