= Urayasu Station (Chiba) =

Metro station in Urayasu, Chiba Prefecture, Japan

Coordinates: 35.665784°N 139.892899°E

Urayasu Station 浦安駅

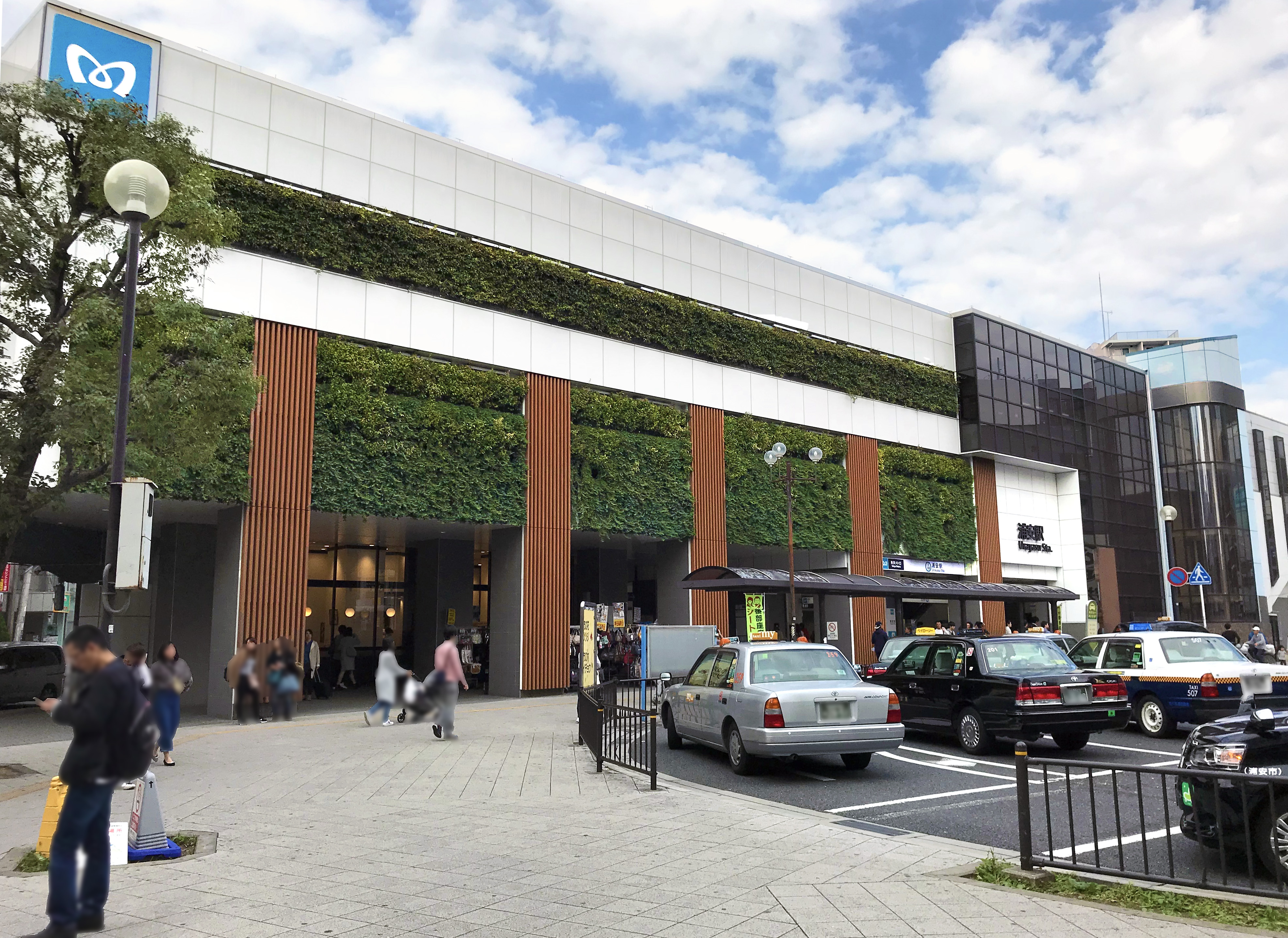
- South station building, November 2018

General information
- Location: 1-13-1 Kitazakae, Urayasu City, Chiba Prefecture; Japan
- Operator: Tokyo Metro
- Line: Tōzai Line
- Platforms: 2 side platforms
- Tracks: 2

Construction
- Structure type: Elevated

Other information
- Station code: T-18

History
- Opened: 29 March 1969; 57 years ago

Services
Preceding station	Tokyo Metro	Following station
Toyocho towards Nakano	Tōzai Line Rapid	Nishi-funabashi towards Nishi-Funabashi
Kasai towards Nakano	Tōzai Line Commuter Rapid	Nishi-funabashi One-way operation
Kasai towards Nakano	Tōzai Line Local	Minami-gyotoku towards Nishi-Funabashi
Location
- Location within Tokyo wards area Location within Tokyo Keiyo area Location within Kanto Area Location within Japan

Urayasu Station (浦安駅, Urayasu-eki) is a railway station on the Tokyo Metro Tozai Line in Urayasu, Chiba, Japan, operated by the Tokyo subway operator Tokyo Metro. Its station number is T-18.

== Lines ==
Urayasu Station is served by the Tokyo Metro Tozai Line.

== Station layout ==
The station consists of two elevated side platforms.

=== Platforms ===
1	Tōzai Line	for Nishi-Funabashi; Chuo-Sobu Line for Tsudanuma; Toyo Rapid Railway Line for Tōyō-Katsutadai
2	Tōzai Line	for Tōyōchō, Ōtemachi, and Nakano; Chuo-Sobu Line for Mitaka

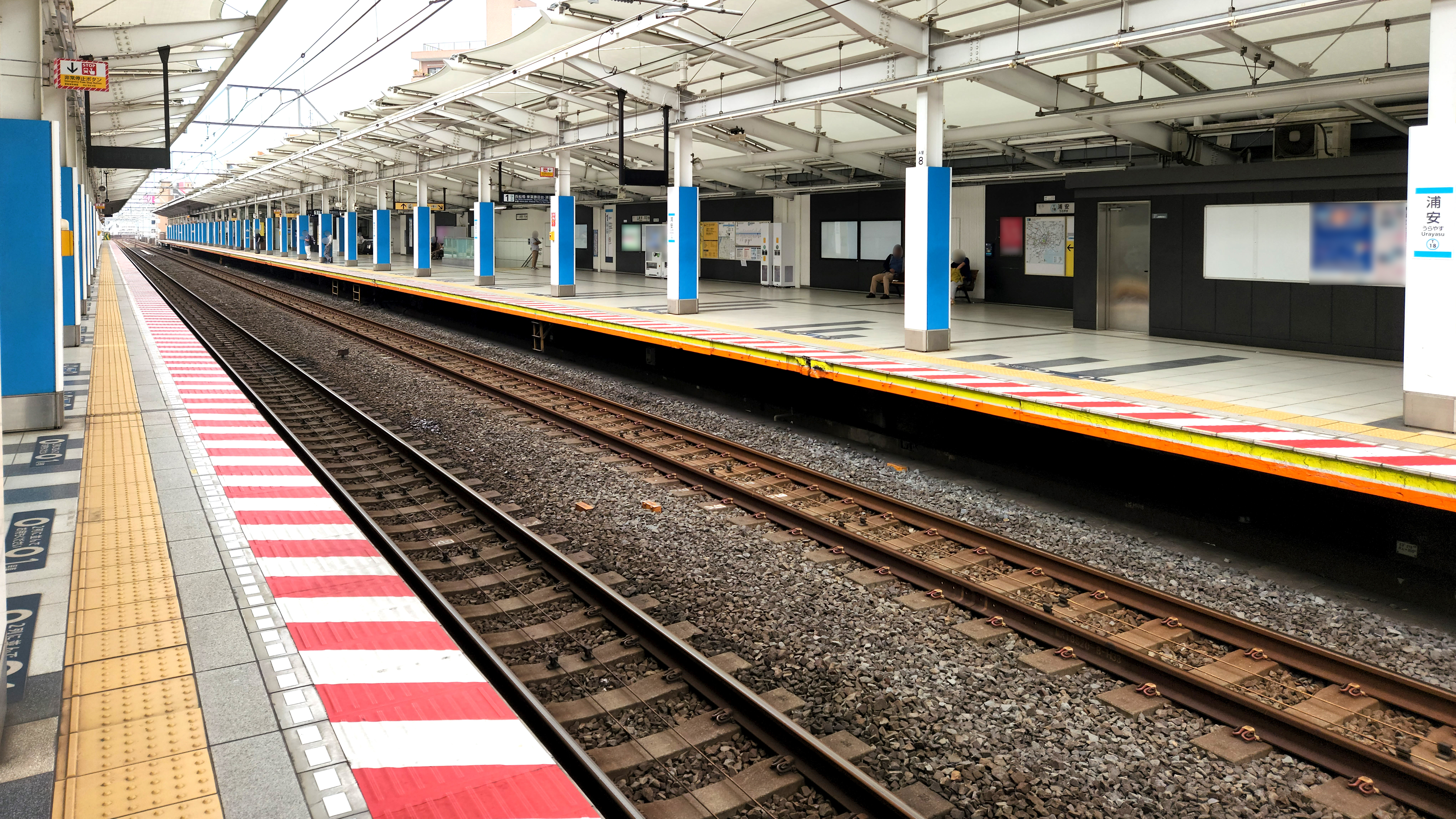
The platforms, July 2022

== History ==
The station opened on 29 March 1969, and consists of two elevated side platforms.

Before the opening of Maihama Station in 1988, Urayasu Station was the nearest train station to Tokyo Disneyland, with bus services between the park and the station.

The station facilities were inherited by Tokyo Metro after the privatization of the Teito Rapid Transit Authority (TRTA) in 2004.
