= Shin-Urayasu Station =

Railway station in Urayasu, Chiba Prefecture, Japan

Coordinates: 35.6501°N 139.9125°E

JE08 Shin-Urayasu Station 新浦安駅
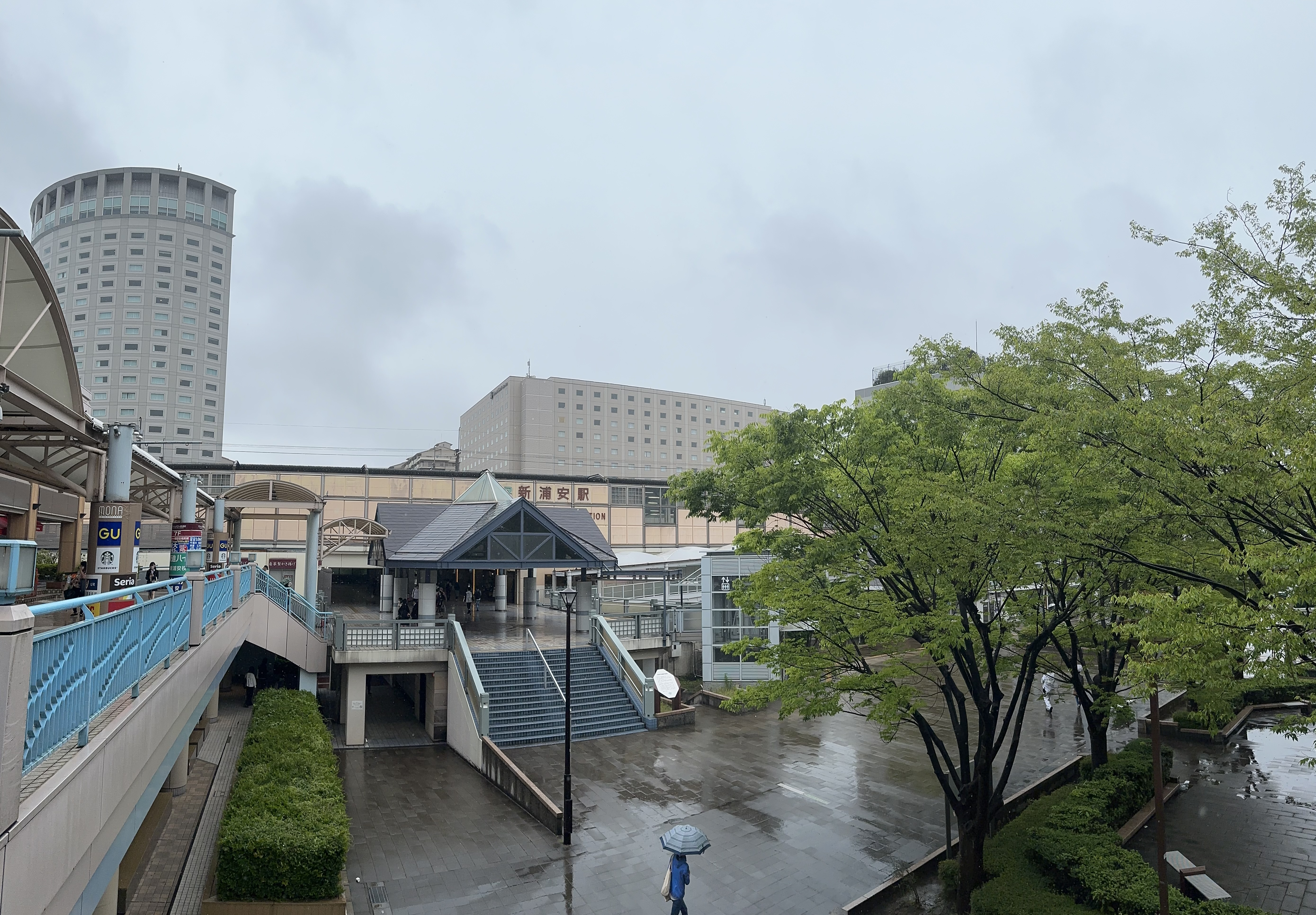
- South Entrance in May 2023

General information
- Location: 1-1-1 Irifune, Urayasu, Chiba （浦安市入船1丁目1-1） Japan
- Operator: JR East
- Line: Keiyō Line
- Platforms: 2 island platforms
- Tracks: 4
- Connections: Bus terminal

Construction
- Structure type: Elevated
- Accessible: Yes

Other information
- Status: Staffed ("Midori no Madoguchi")
- Station code: JE08

History
- Opened: 1 December 1988

Passengers
- FY2016: 55,729 daily

Services
Preceding station	JR East	Following station
Maihama JE07 towards Tokyo	Keiyō Line Rapid	Minami-Funabashi JE11 towards Soga
Maihama JE07 towards Tokyo	Keiyō Line Local	Ichikawashiohama JE09 towards Soga
Maihama JE07 towards Tokyo	Musashino Line Keiyō Line through-service	Ichikawashiohama JE09 towards Fuchūhommachi
Location
- Location within Tokyo Keiyo area Location within Chiba Prefecture Location within Japan

Shin-Urayasu Station (新浦安駅, Shin-Urayasu-eki) is a railway station in Urayasu, Chiba, Japan, operated by the East Japan Railway Company (JR East).

== Lines ==
Shin-Urayasu Station is served by the Keiyō Line between Tokyo and Soga, and by Musashino Line through services between Tokyo and Fuchūhommachi. The station is located 16.1 kilometres (10.0 mi) from the western terminus of the line at Tokyo Station.

== Station layout ==
The elevated station consists of two island platforms serving four tracks. The station has a "Midori no Madoguchi" staffed ticket office.

=== Platforms ===
1, 2	■ Keiyō Line	for Kaihimmakuhari, Chibaminato, Soga, Kimitsu, and Kazusa-Ichinomiya
1, 2	■ Musashino Line through service	for Nishi-Funabashi, Shim-Matsudo, and Fuchūhommachi
3, 4	■ Keiyō Line	for Maihama, Shin-Kiba, and Tokyo

The outer tracks (1 and 4) are generally used by stopping trains to allow non-stop trains to pass.

== History ==
The station opened on 1 December 1988.

Station numbering was introduced in 2016 with Shin-Urayusu being assigned station number JE08.

== Passenger statistics ==
In fiscal 2016, the JR East station was used by an average of 55,729 passengers daily (boarding passengers only).

== Surrounding area ==
- Tokyo Disney Resort
- Meikai University Urayasu campus
- Juntendo University Urayasu campus
- Ryotokuji University
- Urayasu Minami High School (千葉県立浦安南高等学校)
- Urayasu Police Station

== See also ==
- List of railway stations in Japan
