= Tokyo Metro 05 series =

Japanese train type

TRTA/Tokyo Metro 05 series
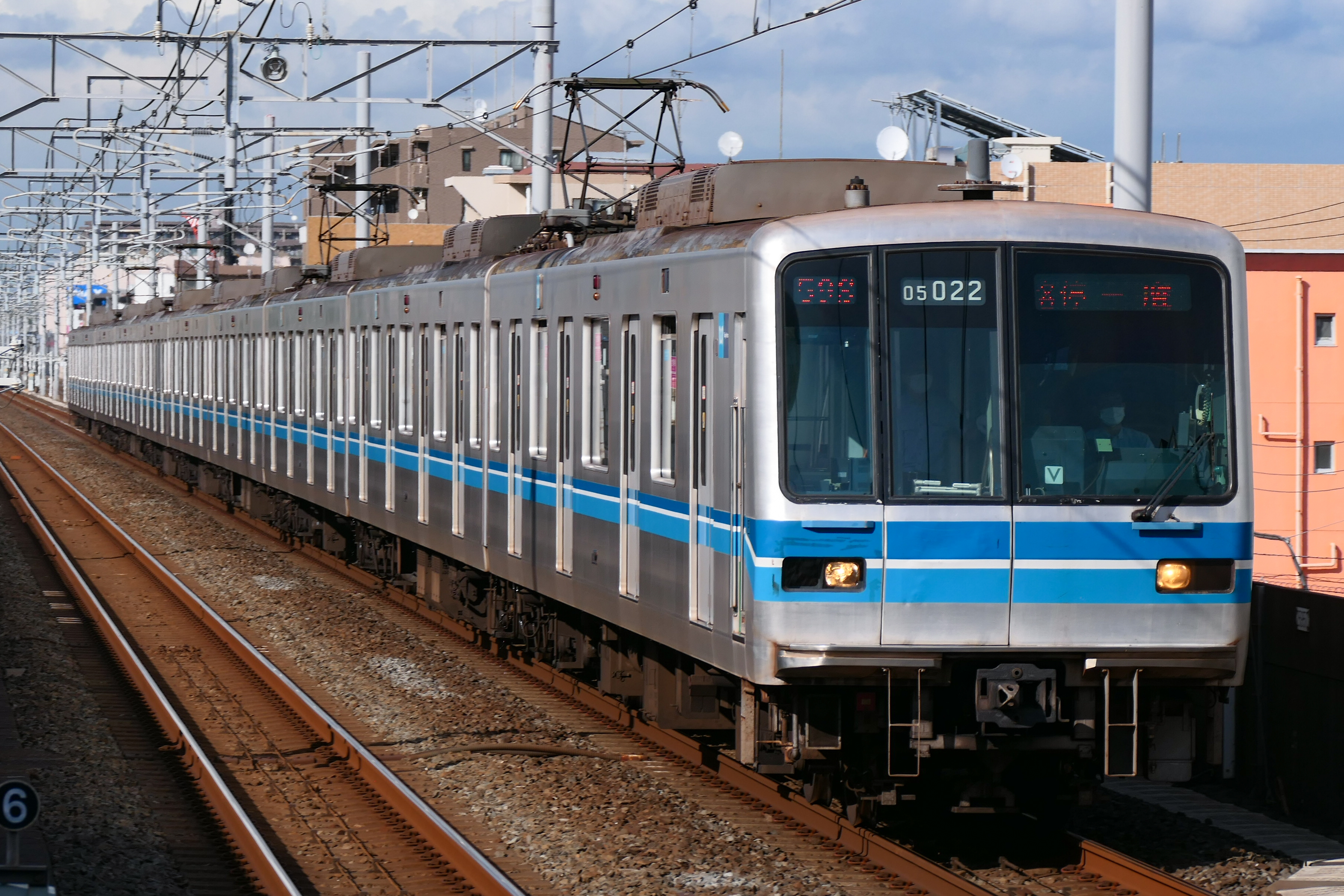
- Set 05-122 in July 2022
- In service: 1988–present (Japan); 2010–present (Indonesia)
- Manufacturers: Kinki Sharyo, Hitachi, Nippon Sharyo, Kawasaki Heavy Industries, Tokyu Car Corporation
- Family name: Hitachi A-train (Batch 13)
- Replaced: Tokyo Metro 5000 series; Tokyo Metro 6000 series (Chiyoda Branch Line)
- Constructed: 1988–2004
- Entered service: 16 November 1988
- Refurbished: Tokyo Metro (2012–); INKA (2023–)
- Scrapped: 2010–
- Number built: 430 vehicles (43 sets)
- Number in service: 188 vehicles (05 series); 190 vehicles (05N series)
- Successor: Tokyo Metro 15000 series (Batch 1, Japan)
- Formation: 10 cars per trainset (Tokyo Metro Tozai Line); 3 cars per trainset (Tokyo Metro Chiyoda Line); 8 cars per trainset (KAI Commuter)
- Fleet numbers: 01-43
- Operators: Teito Rapid Transit Authority (1988–2004); Tokyo Metro (2004–present); KAI Commuter (2011–present)
- Depots: Fukagawa; Depok (KAI Commuter)
- Lines served: Tokyo Metro: Tokyo Metro Tozai Line; Tōyō Rapid Line; Chūō-Sōbu Line; Tokyo Metro Chiyoda Line (Ayase Branch); KAI Commuter: (under refurbishment); KAI Commuter Tanjung Priok Line; KAI Commuter Cikarang Loop Line (Seasonal); KAI Commuter Bogor Line (Seasonal)

Specifications
- Car body construction: Aluminium
- Car length: 20 m (65 ft 7 in)
- Width: 2.850 m (9 ft 4 3/16 in)(05); 2.800 m (9 ft 2 1/4 in)(05N)
- Height: 4.022–4.135 m (13 ft 2 in – 13 ft 7 in) (4.08–4.145 m (13 ft 5 in – 13 ft 7 in) with pantograph)
- Doors: 4 per car
- Maximum speed: 110 km/h (68.4 mph) (design, sets 05101-05133); 120 km/h (74.6 mph) (design, 05134-05143); 100 km/h (62.1 mph) (Tokyo Metro Tozai Line)
- Traction system: 4-quadrant GTO chopper; Variable frequency (GTO/IGBT)
- Transmission: Westinghouse Natal (WN) drive
- Acceleration: 3.3 km/(h⋅s) (2.1 mph/s)
- Deceleration: 3.5 km/(h⋅s) (2.2 mph/s)
- Electric systems: 1,500 V DC overhead catenary
- Current collection: Pantograph
- Bogies: Bolsterless air spring bogie
- Braking system: Electronically controlled pneumatic brakes with regenerative braking
- Safety systems: CS-ATC (Tokyo Metro Tozai Line), ATS-P (Chūō-Sōbu Line), WS-ATC (Tōyō Rapid Railway)
- Coupling system: Shibata
- Track gauge: 1,067 mm (3 ft 6 in)

The TRTA/Tokyo Metro 05 series (営団・東京メトロ05系, Eidan/Tōkyō Metoro 05-kei) is an electric multiple unit (EMU) train type operated on the Tokyo Metro Tozai Line and Tokyo Metro Chiyoda Line Ayase Branch in Japan by the subway operator Tokyo Metro. Some sets have also been shipped to Indonesia, where they operated on the KRL Commuterline system in Jakarta.

A total of 43 ten-car trainsets were built from 1988 to 2004, with a number of variants. Sets 05-125 onward have a redesigned front end, and are called "05N series". Sets 05-114 to 05-118 have wide doors. A further four sets were due to be built, but the plan was changed to use 07 series trains transferred from the Yurakucho Line, so no further 05 series trains were built.

== Operations ==
As of 1 April 2017, a total of 34 sets (30 x ten-car sets and 4 x three-car sets) were in operation in Japan.

=== Tozai Line 10-car sets ===
30 x ten-car sets based at Fukagawa Depot and used on the following lines.

- Tokyo Metro Tozai Line
- Tōyō Rapid Line between Nishi-Funabashi Station, Tōyō-Katsutadai Station and Nakano Station.
- JR Chūō-Sōbu Line between Nakano Station and Mitaka Station.
- JR Chūō-Sōbu Line between Nishi-Funabashi Station and Tsudanuma Station (only weekday mornings and evenings).

=== Chiyoda Line 3-car sets ===
Four three-car sets based at Ayase Depot for use on Chiyoda Line Kita-Ayase Branch Line services since 2014.

== Specifications ==
	05-101 to 113	05-114	05-115 to 118	05-119 to 124	05-125 to 133	05-134 to 139	05-140 to 143
Max speed (km/h)	110					120	
Acceleration (km/h/s)	3.3	3.0	3.3				
Deceleration (km/h/s)	3.5 (emergency 5.0)						
Front end style	Rectangular lights, no skirt				Round lights, skirt		
Headlights	Sealed beam					HID	
Destination indicators	Roller blind (converted Chiyoda branch line use LED display)	3-colour LED					
Interior LED displays	8 per car						4 per car
Control system	Chopper	GTO-VVVF	Chopper	IGBT-VVVF			
Motor/trailer ratio	5M5T	4M6T	5M5T	4M6T		5M5T	
Motor output (kW per motor)	160	200	160	205		165	
Train power output (kW)	3,200			3,280		3,300	
Gear ratio	5.73 (86:15)	7.79 (109:14)	5.73 (86:15)	7.79 (109:14)		6.21 (87:14)	
Pantographs	lozenge x5	lozenge x4	lozenge x5	lozenge x4		single arm x5	single arm x3
Door width (m)	1.3	1.8		1.3			
Driving controls	Dual handle				single handle		
Seat configuration	3-7-7-7-3	2-6-6-6-2		4-6-7-6-4		3-7-7-7-3	

- Note: Sets 05-135 to 139 use 3 pantographs (other pantographs are not used).

== Batch differences ==
- 05-101 to 05-113
  - Built 1988 to 1991.
  - From05-104 front end glass is slightly extended.
- 05-114
  - Built 1991.
  - Wide-door cars.
  - VVVF prototype cars.
- 05-115 to 05-118
  - Built 1992.
  - Wide-door cars.
  - Control system same as sets 05-101 to 05-113.
- 05-119 to 05-124
  - Built 1993 to 1994.
  - Control system is similar to 06 series and 07 series.
  - Window sizes are not uniform.
  - Set 05-124 contains recycled aluminium components.
- 05-125 to 05-133
  - Built 1999 to 2001.
  - Design is completely changed.(05N)
  - Performance is similar to sets 119 to 124.
- 05–134 to 05-139
  - Built 2002 to 2003.
  - Control system is similar to 08 series (used on Hanzōmon Line), with increased performance.
  - Uniform window size
- 05-140 to 05-143 (13th batch)
  - Built 2004.
  - Control system is similar to sets 134 to 139, but uses pure electric braking.
  - Body fabrication changed to adopt Hitachi A-Train concept.
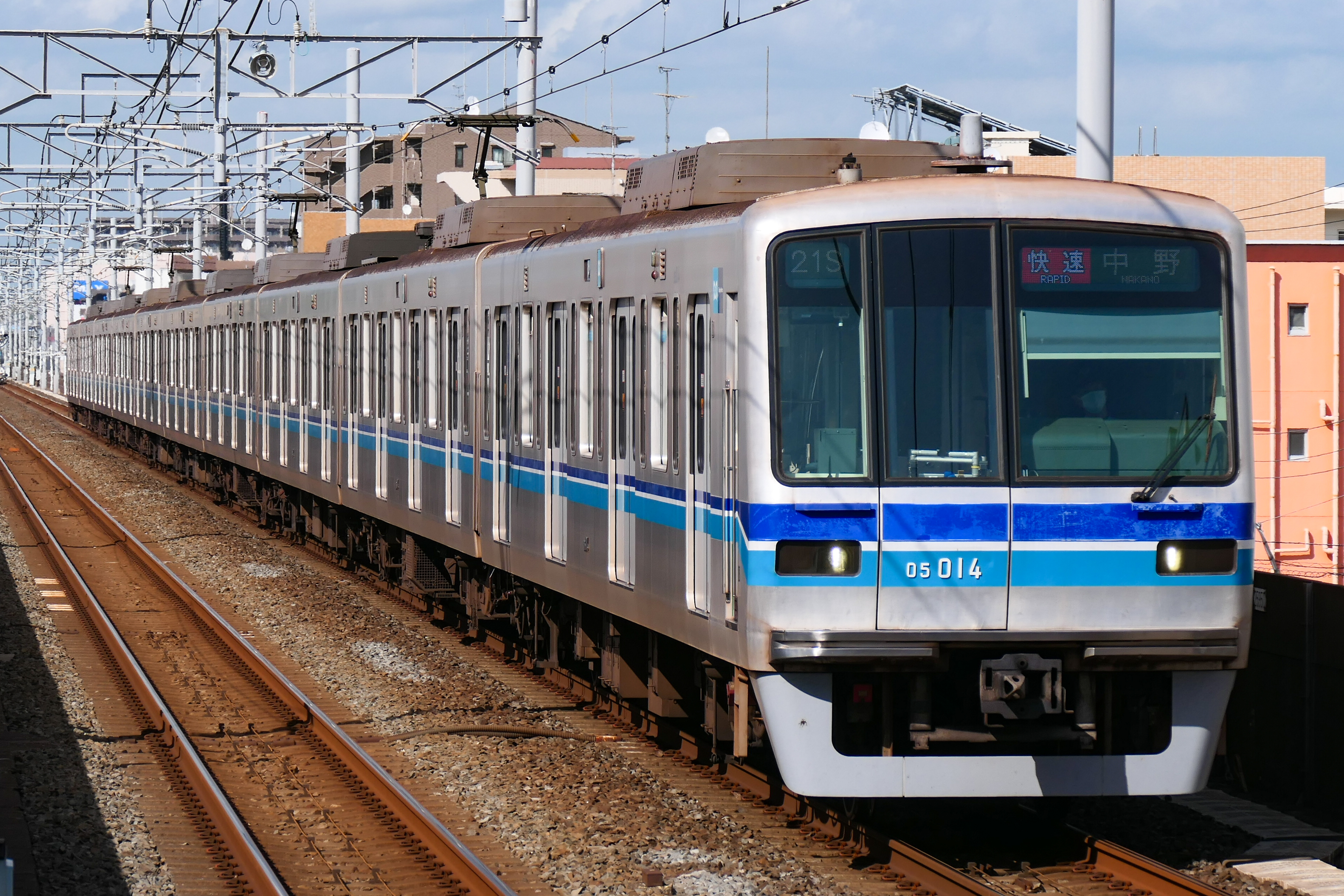
05-114 with wide doors and GTO-VVVF system in July 2022

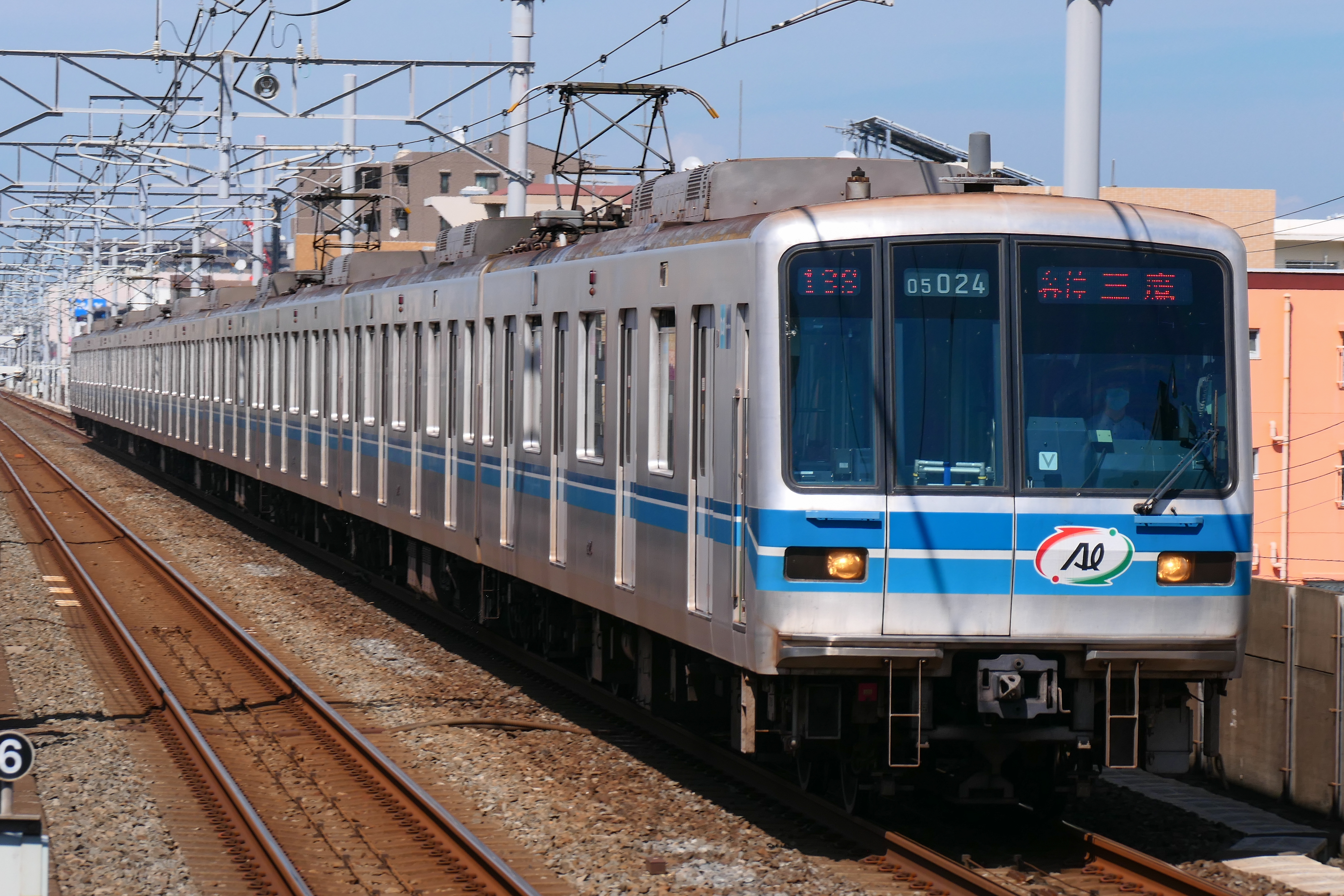
Set 05-124 in July 2022

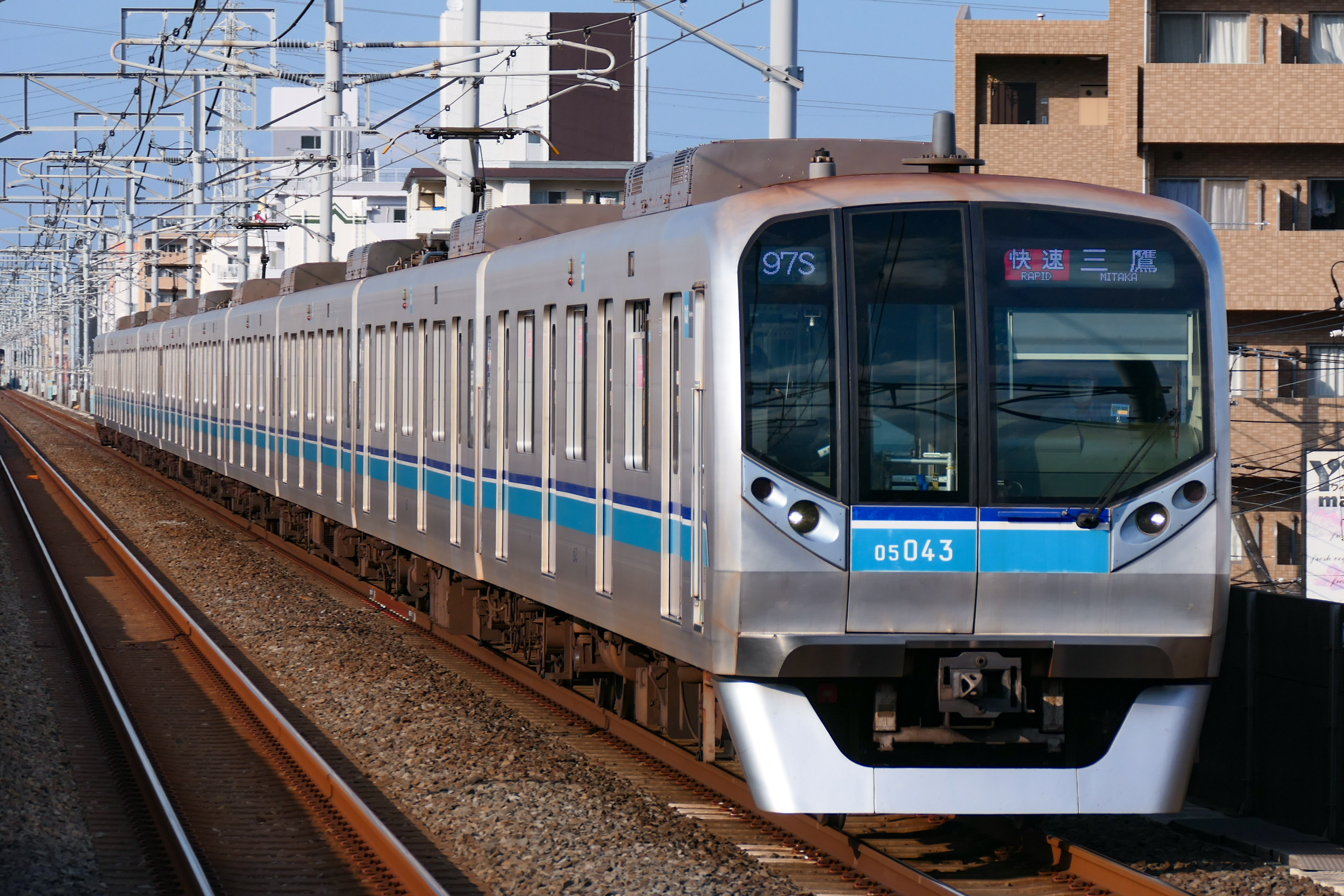
Set 05-143 in May 2022

== Formations ==
=== Refurbished sets ===
The refurbished sets are formed as shown below, with four motored "M" cars, and with car 1 at the Nishi-Funabashi end.

Car No.	1	2	3	4	5	6	7	8	9	10
Designation	CT1	M1	T	M2	Tc1	Tc2	M3	T'	M4	CT2
Numbering	05-100	05-200	05-400	05-800	05-500	05-600	05-300	05-700	05-900	05-000
Weight (t)	24.9	33.5	22.8	32.0	25.9	25.6	32.3	23.3	32.2	25.0
Capacity (total/seated)	143/40	155/42	154/44					154/42	154/44	143/40

Each motored car (cars 2, 4, 7, and 9) is fitted with one single-arm pantograph.

=== Chiyoda Line Kita-Ayase Branch 3-car sets ===
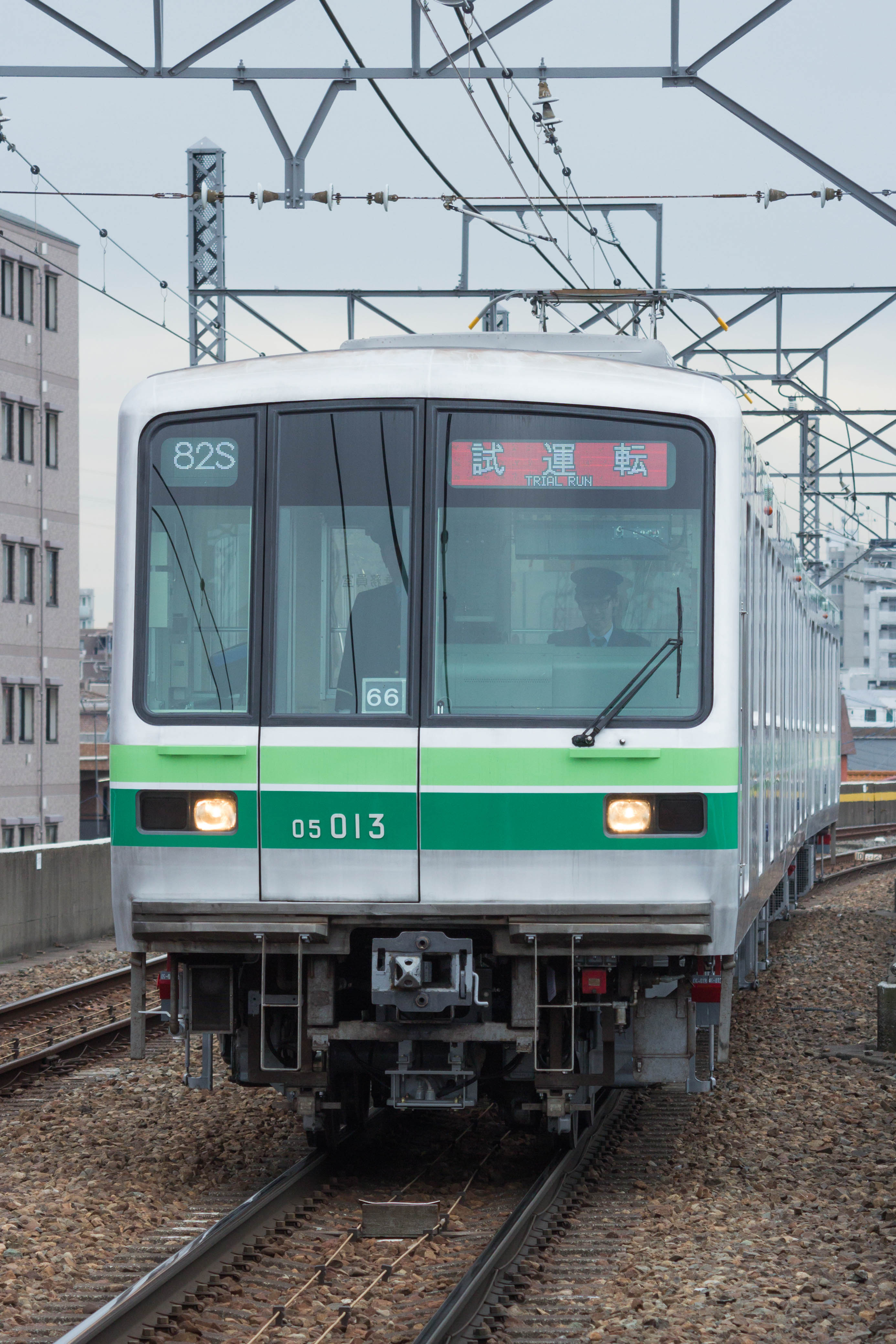
A 3-car Chiyoda Line set in March 2014

The four sets refurbished and reformed as three-car units for use on the Chiyoda Line Kita-Ayase Branch from April 2014 are formed as shown below, with two motored ("M") cars and one non-powered trailer ("T") car, and with car 1 at the Ayase end. Sets 05-101, 05-103, 05-106 and 05-113 have been moved to the Chiyoda line.

Car No.	1	2	3
Designation	CM	M1	CT
Numbering	05-100	05-200	05-000
Capacity (total/seated)	142/48	154/51	142/48

- The "M1" car has two lozenge-type pantographs.
- The two motored cars each have three axles motored.

== Interior ==
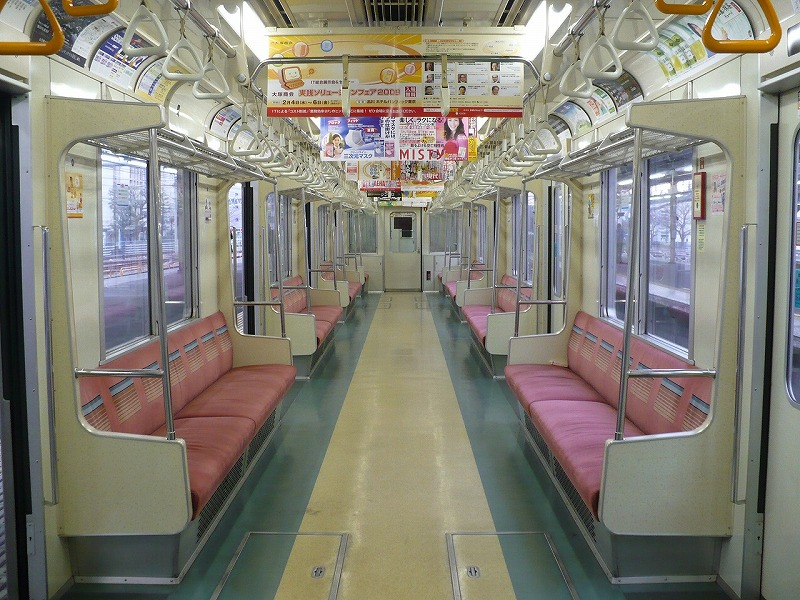
Interior of a Tokyo Metro 05 series (1st batch)

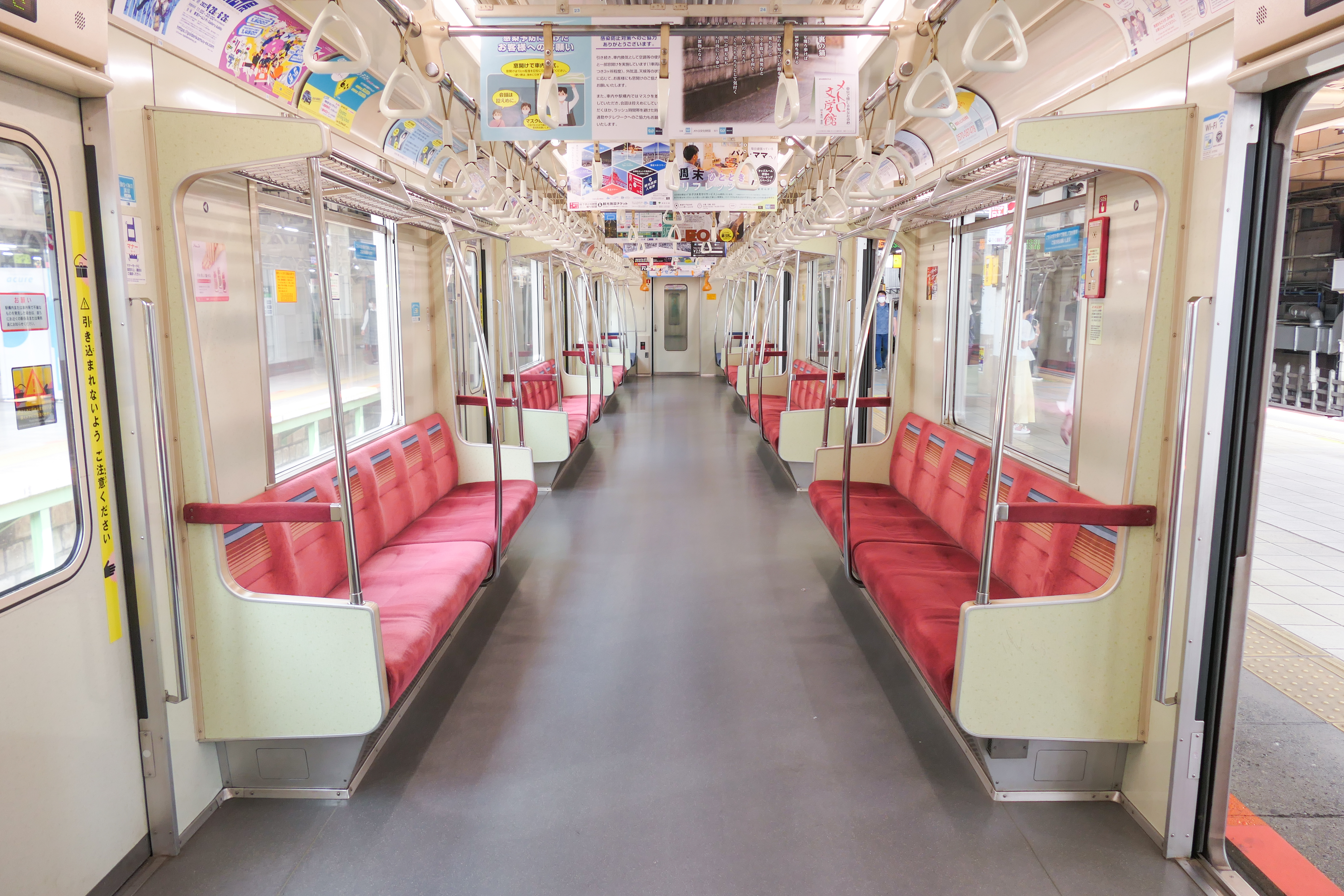
Interior of a Tokyo Metro 05 series (7th batch)

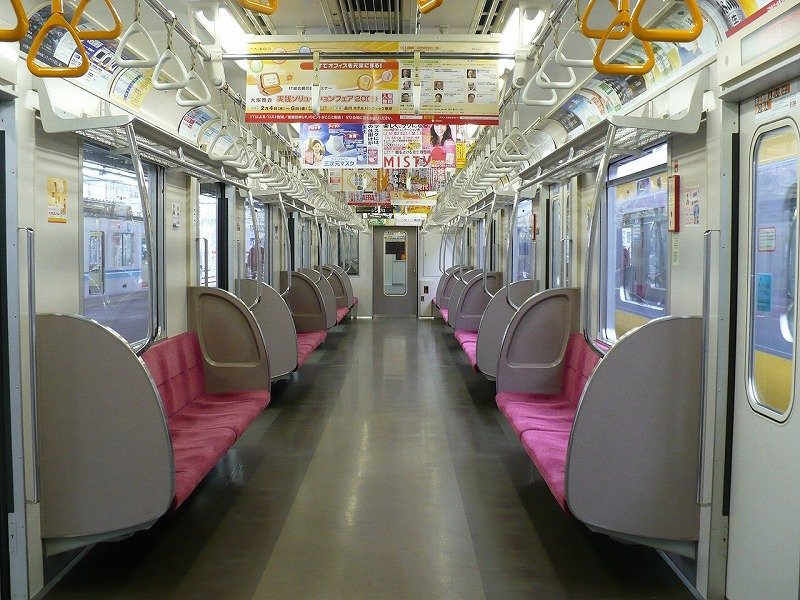
Interior of a Tokyo Metro 05N series (9th batch)

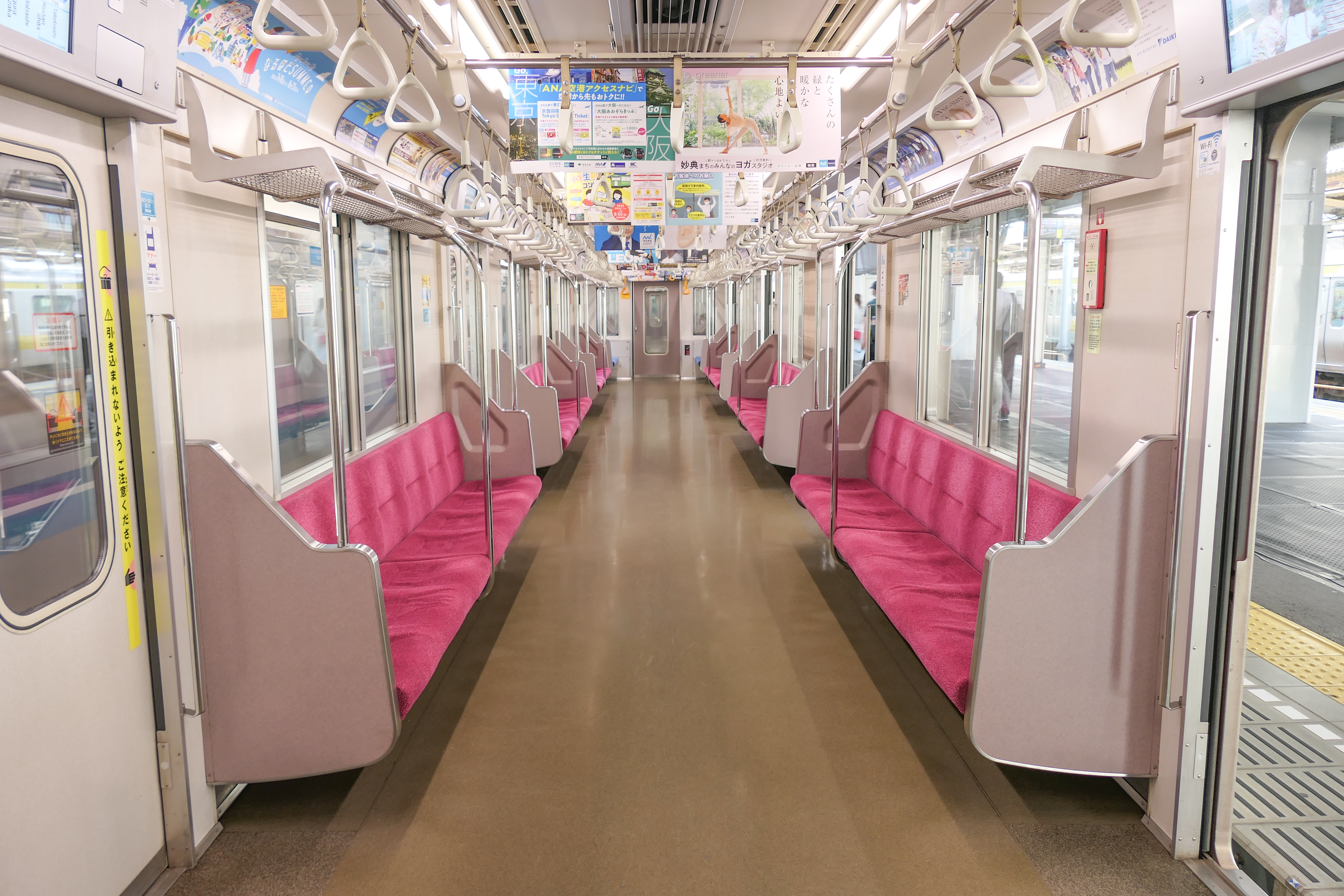
Interior of a Tokyo Metro 05N series (12th batch)

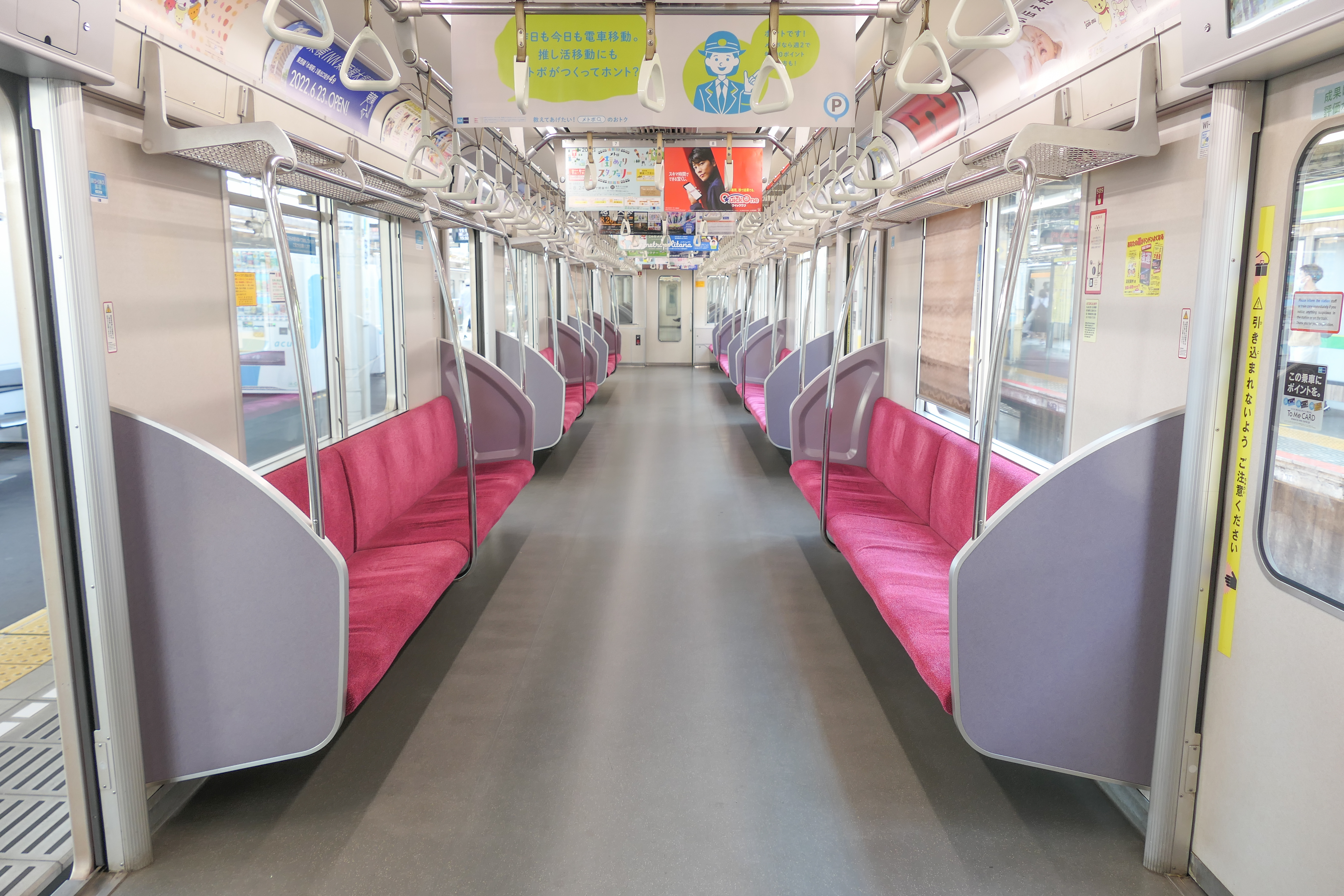
Interior of a Tokyo Metro 05N series (13th batch)

== Refurbishment ==
In December 2012, set 05-114 underwent "type B" refurbishment, with a number of improvements utilizing features on the newer 15000 series sets. The traction motors were replaced with new PMSM (permanent magnet synchronous motors), as used on the Chiyoda Line 16000 series sets, and internally, 17-inch (432 mm) LCD passenger information screens were added above the doorways. The same was done to fifth-batch sets 05-115 to 05-118 over the next few years, and eventually all sixth-batch sets 05-119 to 05-121 by the end of May 2020.

All Tokyo Metro trains, including the Tokyo Metro 05 series in Indonesia, are planned to be retrofitted or refurbished by INKA soon. The refurbishment or retrofit process including conversion from 4-Quadrant Chopper to IGBT-VVVF and changing the number of cars per trainset (8 cars to 12 cars per trainset).

== Retirement ==
The 05 series begun to be replaced by new 15000 series trains from May 2010. The first batch was replaced by the 15000 series, and has since been scrapped.

Eight former 05 series sets have been shipped to KAI Commuter (formerly known as KA Commuter Jabodetabek / KRL Jabodetabek) in Jakarta, Indonesia. They are sets 05-102, 05-104, 05-105, 05-107, 05-108, 05–109, 05-110 and 05–112. These sets have been reduced to eight cars.

Set 05-107 was withdrawn following derailment accident damage sustained in October 2012.

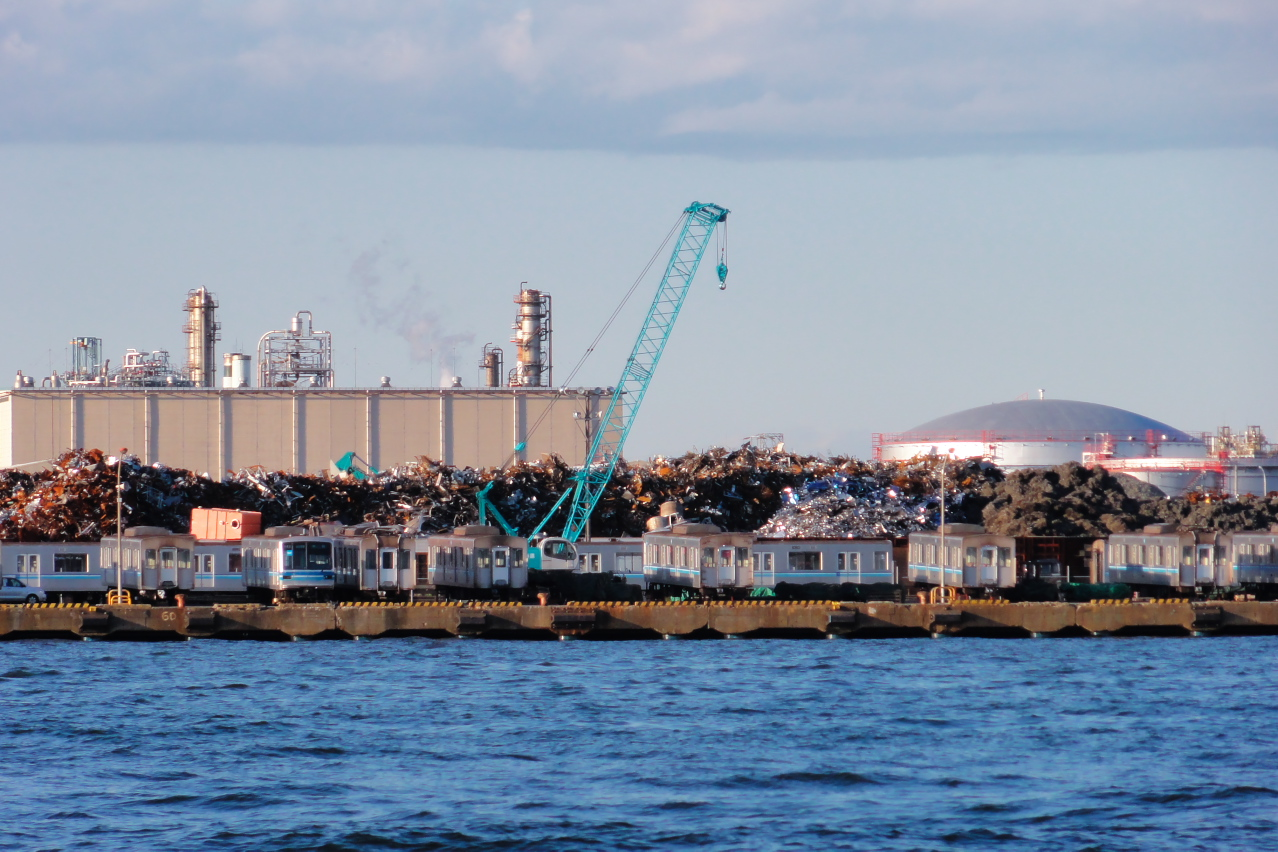
Withdrawn 05 series units at Kawasaki wharf awaiting shipping to Indonesia in November 2010

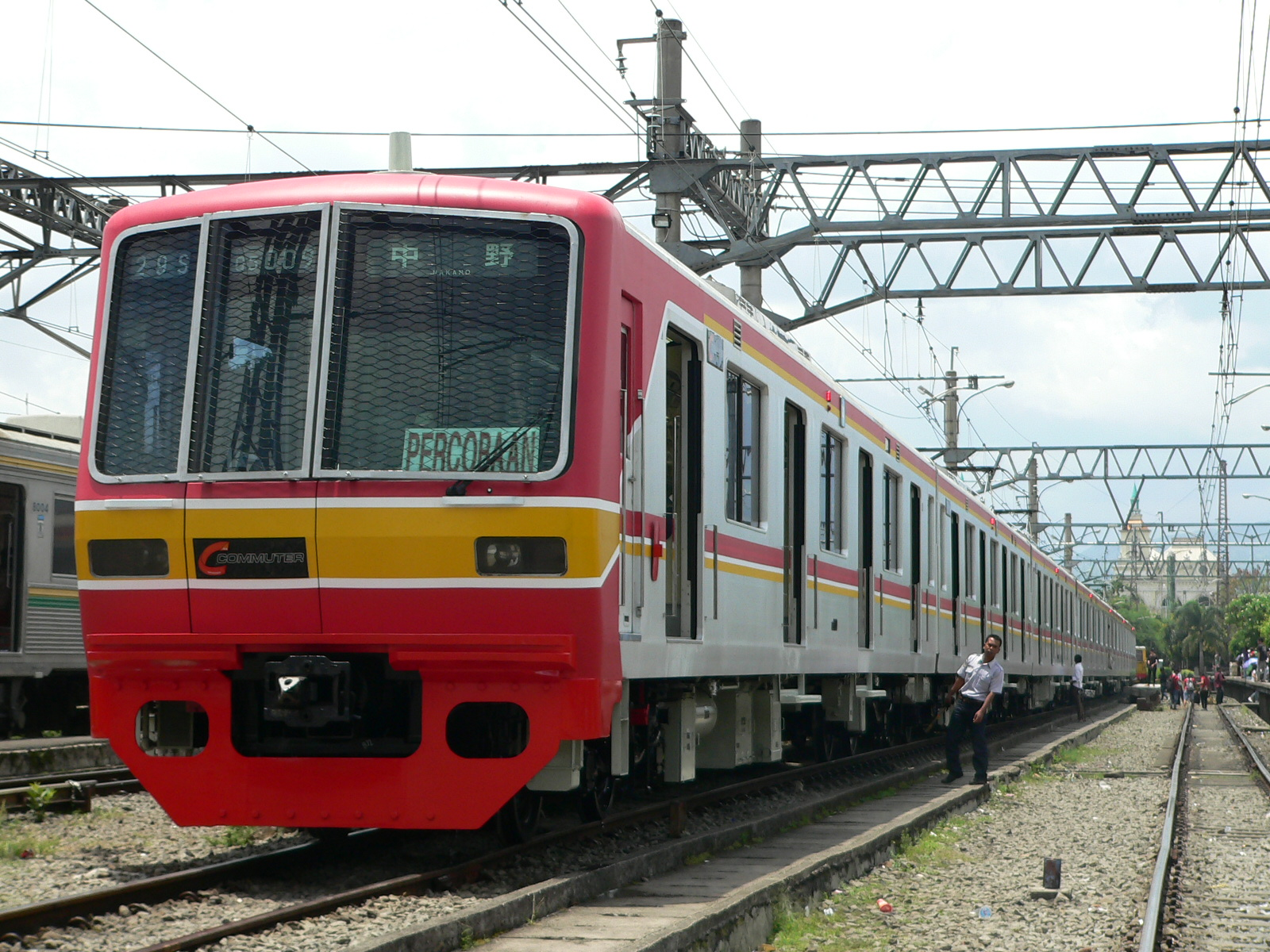
Former 05 series set 109 operated by Kereta Commuter Indonesia in Jakarta, Indonesia, in February 2011

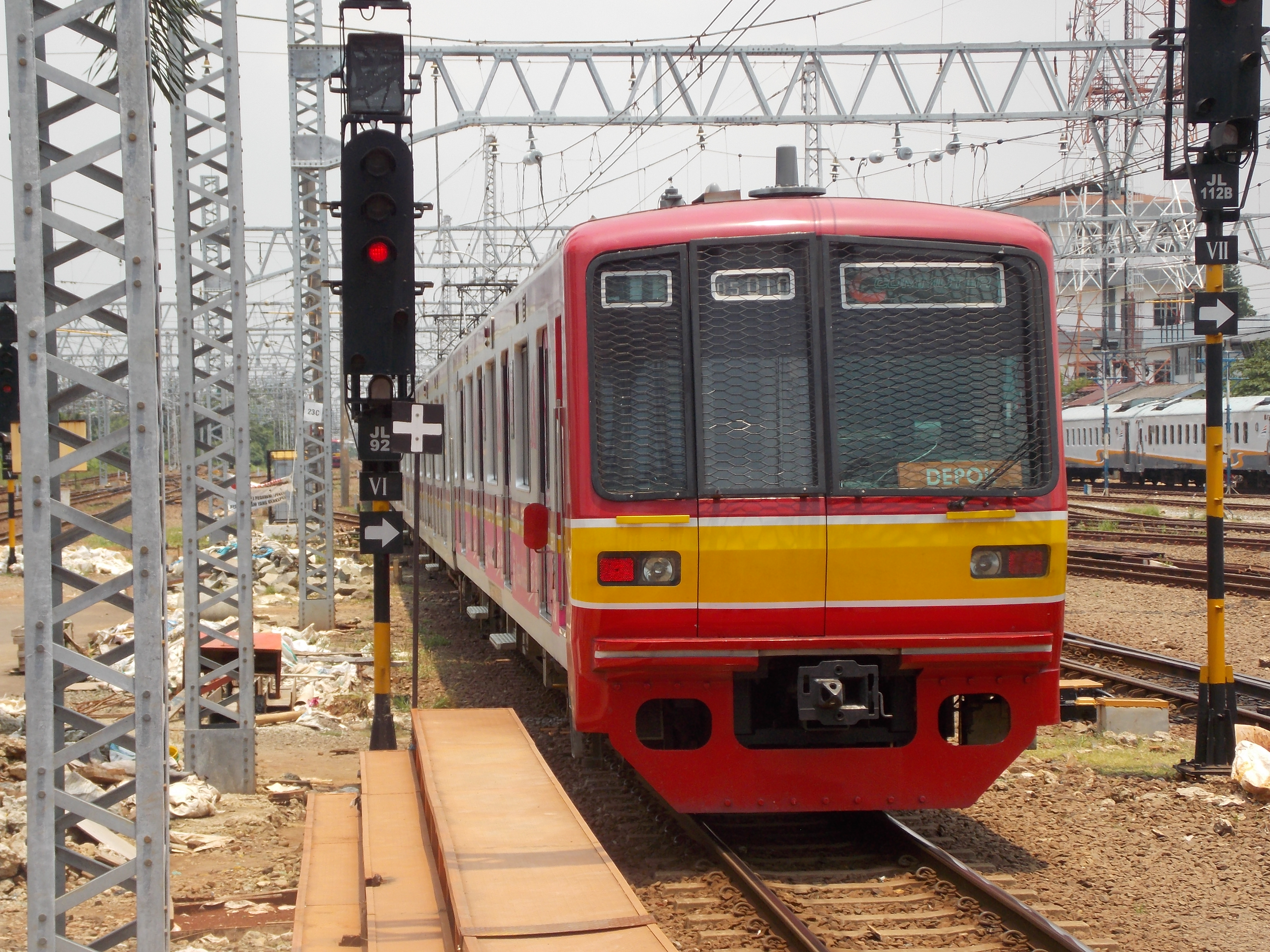
Former 05 series set 110 in Indonesia in March 2016

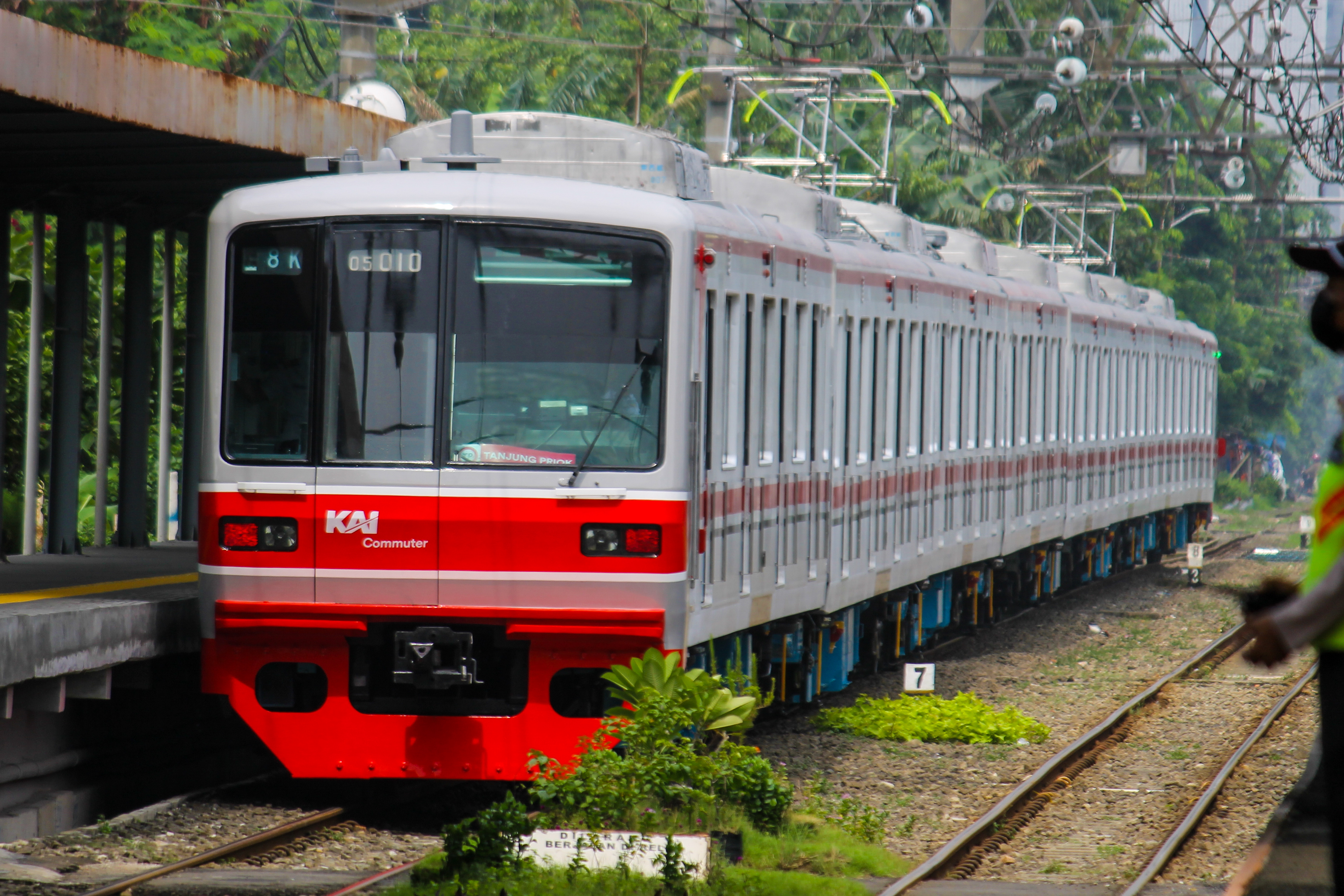
Repainted set 110 in Ancol railway station.

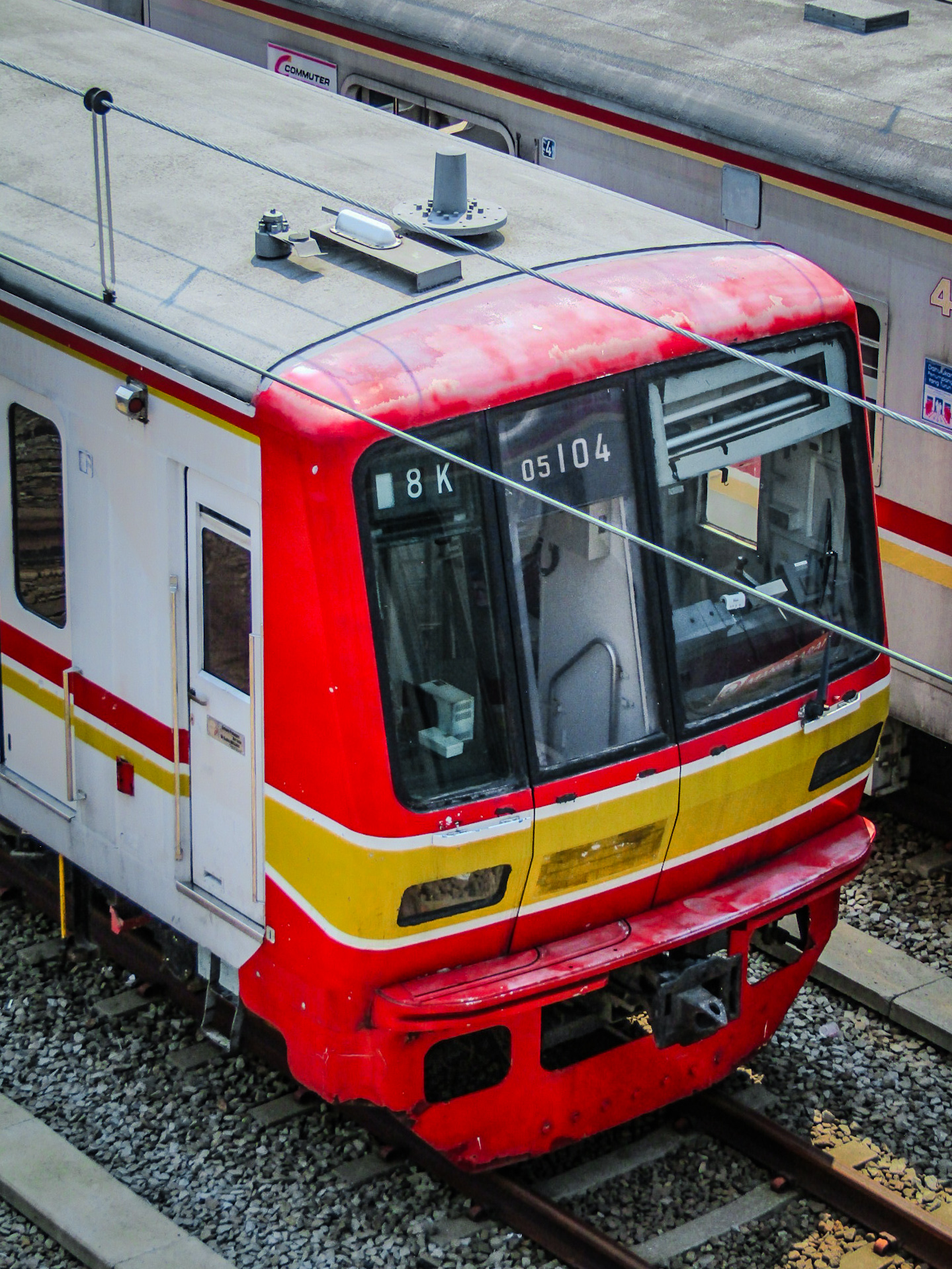
05-104F parked at Depok KRL Depot emplacement.

== Gallery ==
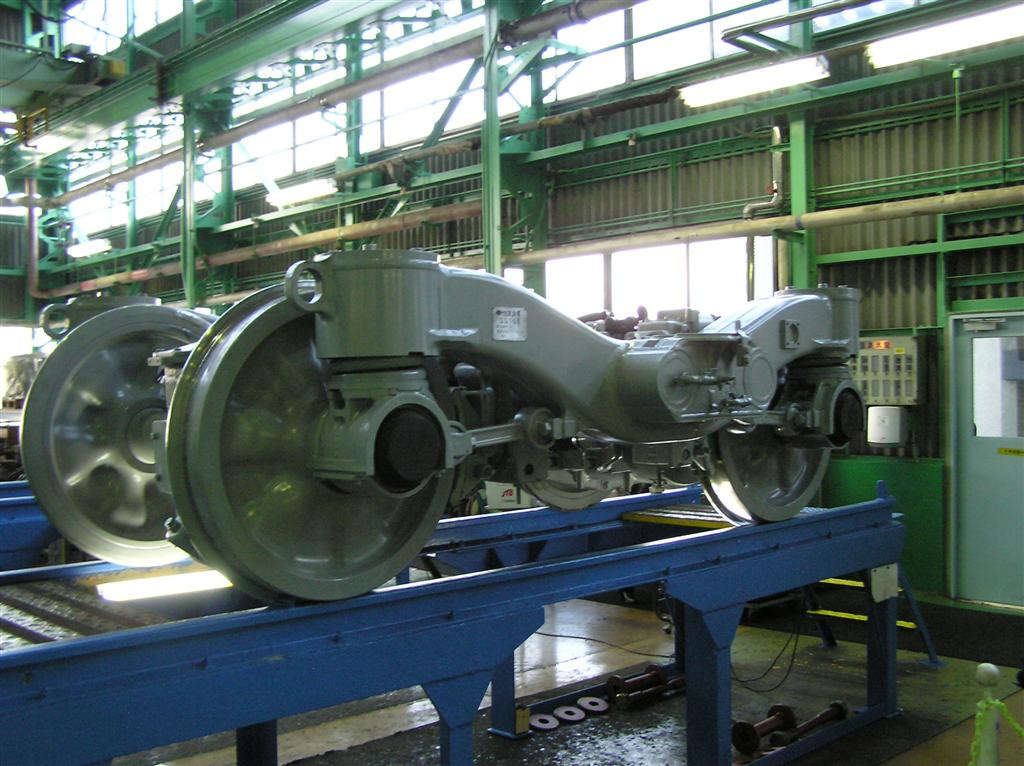
SS161 bogie of a 05 series

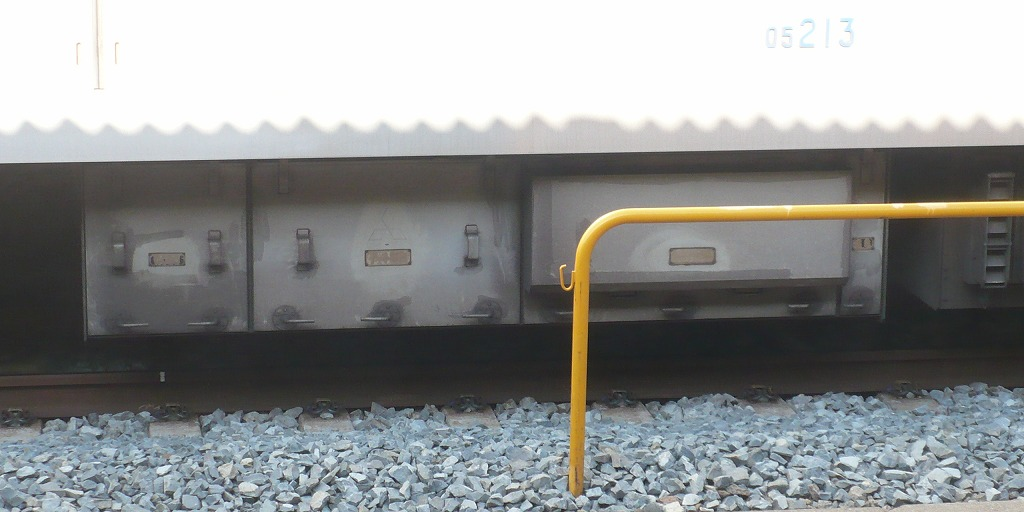
Chopper control device as used on the 05 series

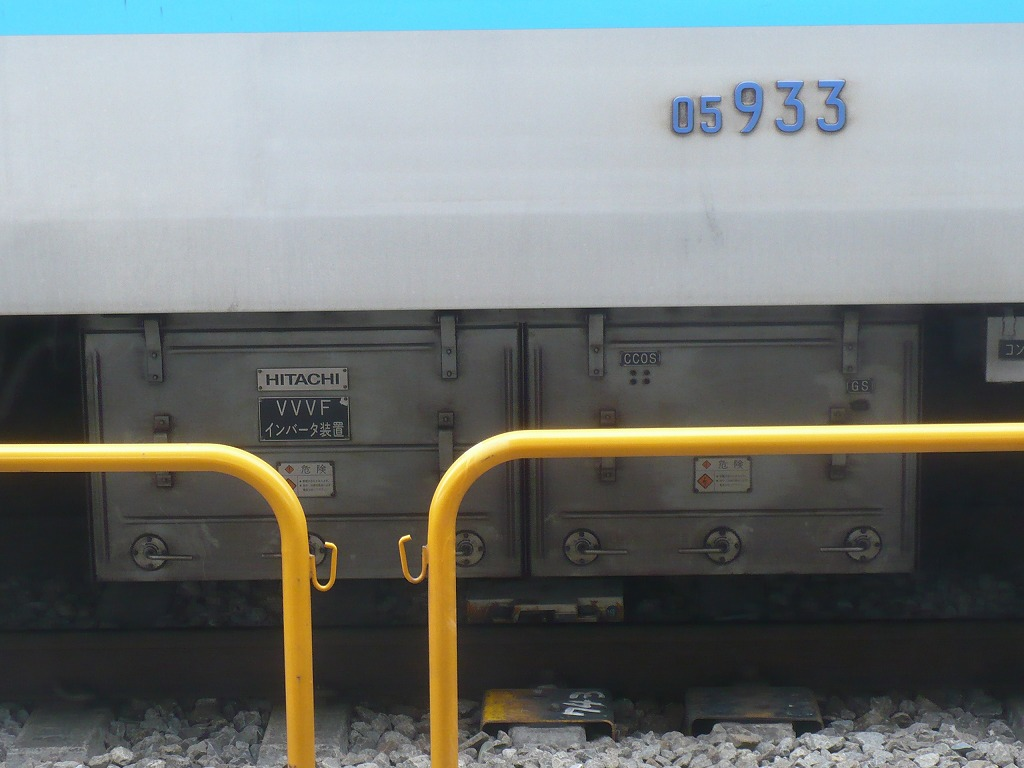
VVVF inverter as used on the 05 series

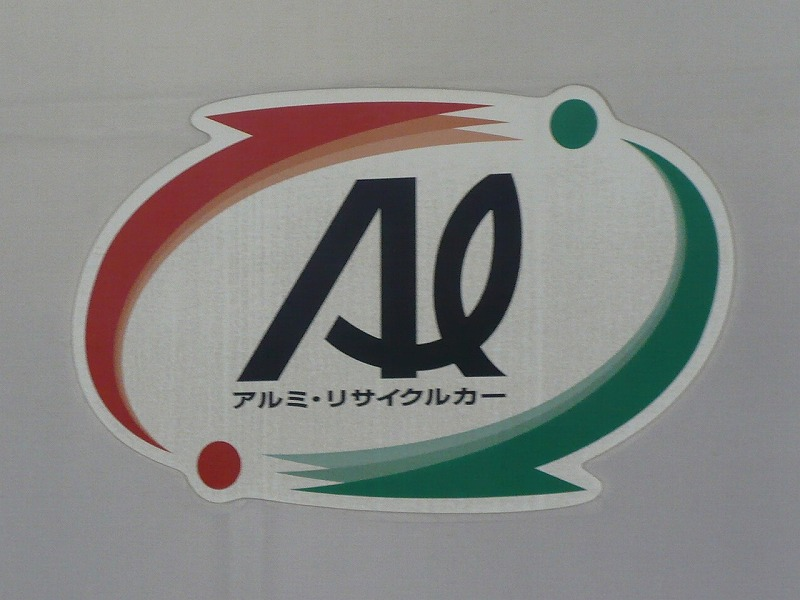
Some 05 series trains bear this sticker to indicate that they were made using recycled aluminium

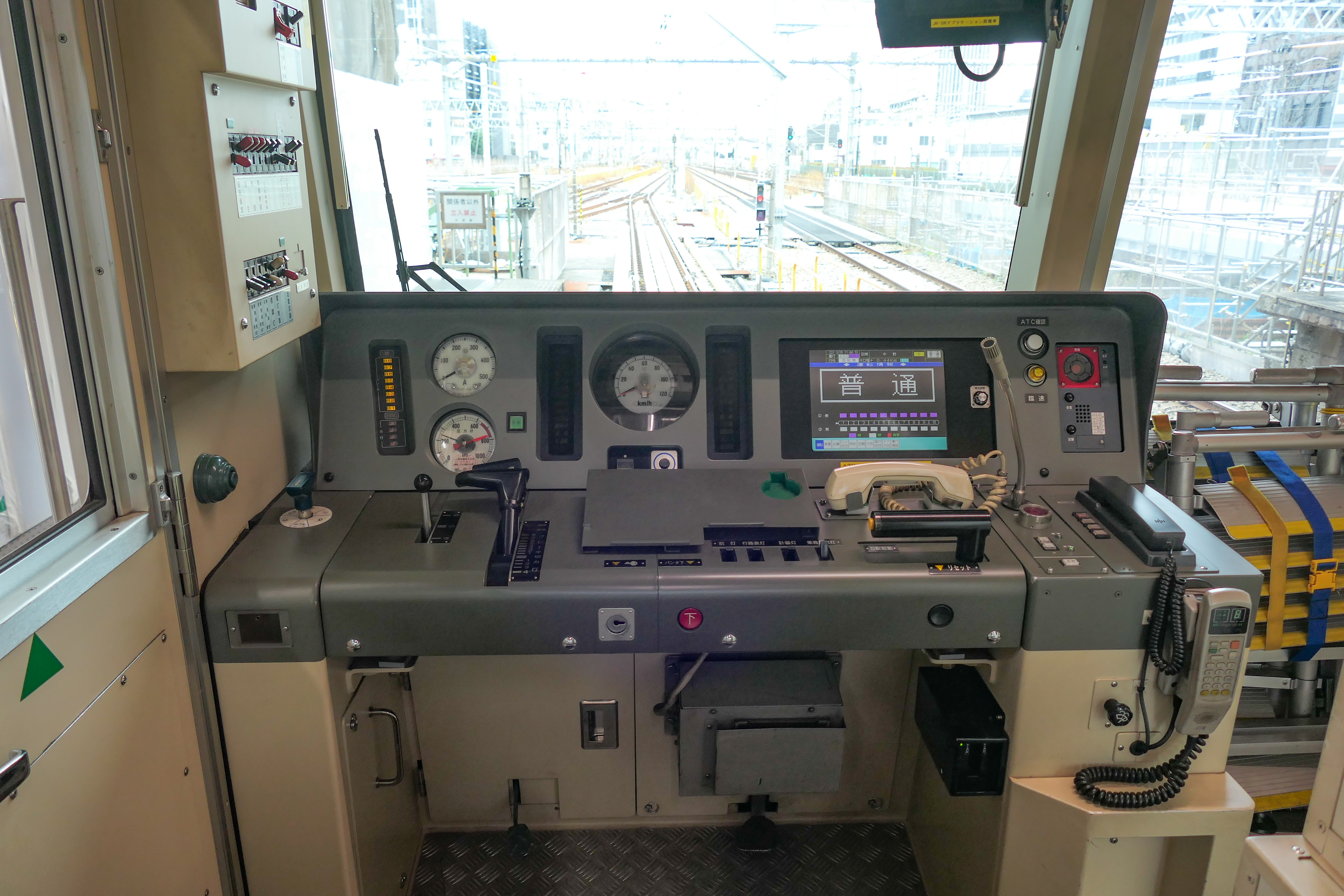
Control cab of the 05 series

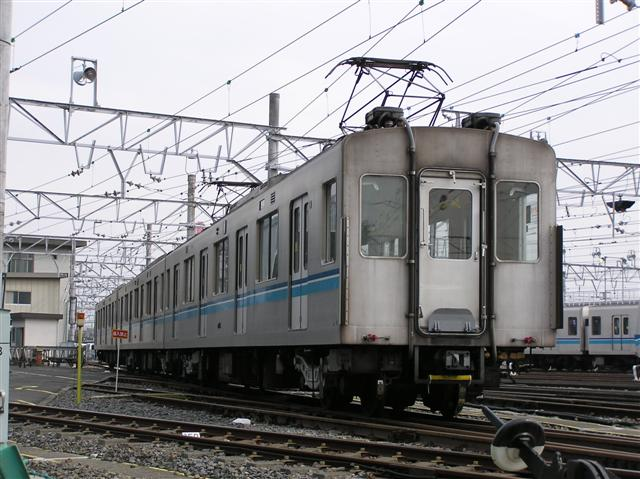
Gangway connection of a 05 series

== See also ==
- Tōyō Rapid 2000 series, trains built to the same design (05N Version)
