= Tokyo Metro 15000 series =

Japanese train type

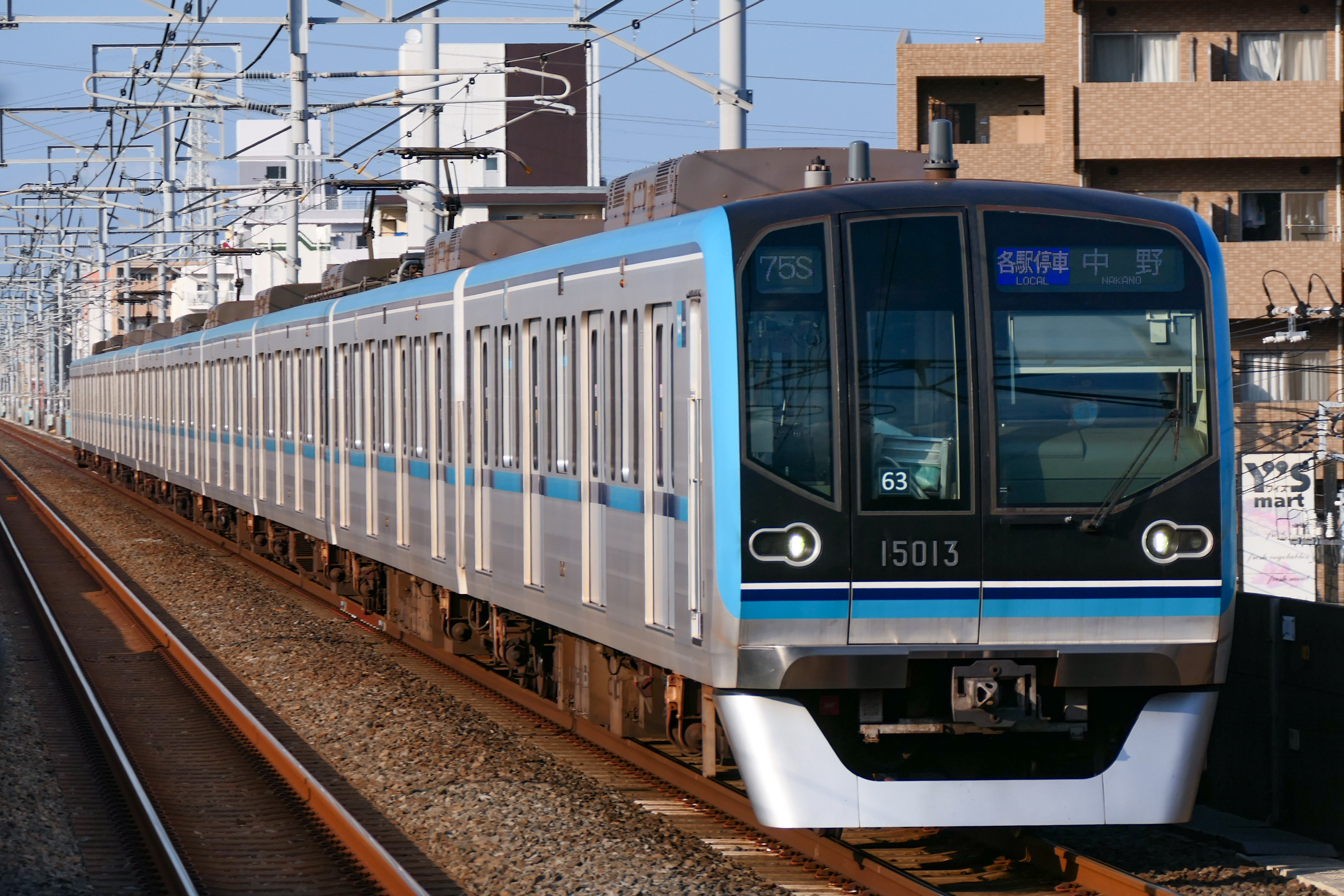
- A Tozai Line 15000 series train
- In service: May 2010–present
- Manufacturer: Hitachi
- Built at: Kudamatsu, Yamaguchi
- Family name: Hitachi A-train
- Replaced: Tokyo Metro 05 series (Batch 1)
- Constructed: 2010–2017
- Entered service: 7 May 2010
- Number built: 160 vehicles (16 sets)
- Number in service: 160 vehicles (16 sets)
- Formation: 10 cars per trainset
- Fleet numbers: 51–66
- Capacity: 143 (38 seating) (front car), 154 (44 seating) (intermediate cars), 155 (42) (intermediate cars with wheelchair space)
- Operator: Tokyo Metro
- Depot: Fukagawa Depot
- Lines served: Tokyo Metro Tōzai Line, Chūō-Sōbu Line, Tōyō Rapid Line

Specifications
- Car body construction: Aluminium alloy
- Car length: 20,520 mm (67 ft 4 in) (end cars); 20,000 mm (65 ft 7 in) (intermediate cars)
- Width: 2,850 mm (9 ft 4 in)
- Height: 4,022 mm (13 ft 2.3 in), with pantograph: 4,080 mm (13 ft 5 in)
- Doors: 4 pairs per side
- Maximum speed: 100 km/h (62 mph)
- Weight: 294.3 t
- Traction system: IGBT–VVVF (Mitsubishi Electric)
- Traction motors: 3-phase AC induction motor (Mitsubishi Electric)
- Power output: 4.5 MW (6,035 hp)
- Acceleration: 3.3 km/(h⋅s) (2.1 mph/s)
- Deceleration: 3.5 km/(h⋅s) (2.2 mph/s) (service); 5.0 km/(h⋅s) (3.1 mph/s) (emergency)
- Electric systems: 1,500 V DC overhead catenary
- Current collection: Pantograph
- Bogies: FS778
- Braking systems: Electronically controlled pneumatic brakes with regenerative braking, pure electric braking
- Safety systems: New CS-ATC/CS-ATC (Tokyo Metro Tozai Line), ATS-P (Chūō-Sōbu Line), WS-ATC (Tōyō Rapid Railway)
- Coupling system: Shibata
- Track gauge: 1,067 mm (3 ft 6 in)

The Tokyo Metro 15000 series (東京メトロ15000系, Tōkyō Metoro 15000-kei) is an electric multiple unit (EMU) train type operated by Tokyo subway operator Tokyo Metro on the Tokyo Metro Tozai Line in Tokyo, Japan, since May 2010.

== Design ==
Based on the earlier Tokyo Metro 05 series (13th batch) and Tokyo Metro 10000 series trains, the 15000 series trains have 500 mm (20 in) wider doors (1,800 mm (71 in) as opposed to 1,300 mm (51 in)) to speed up boarding and alighting at stations during rush-hour periods.

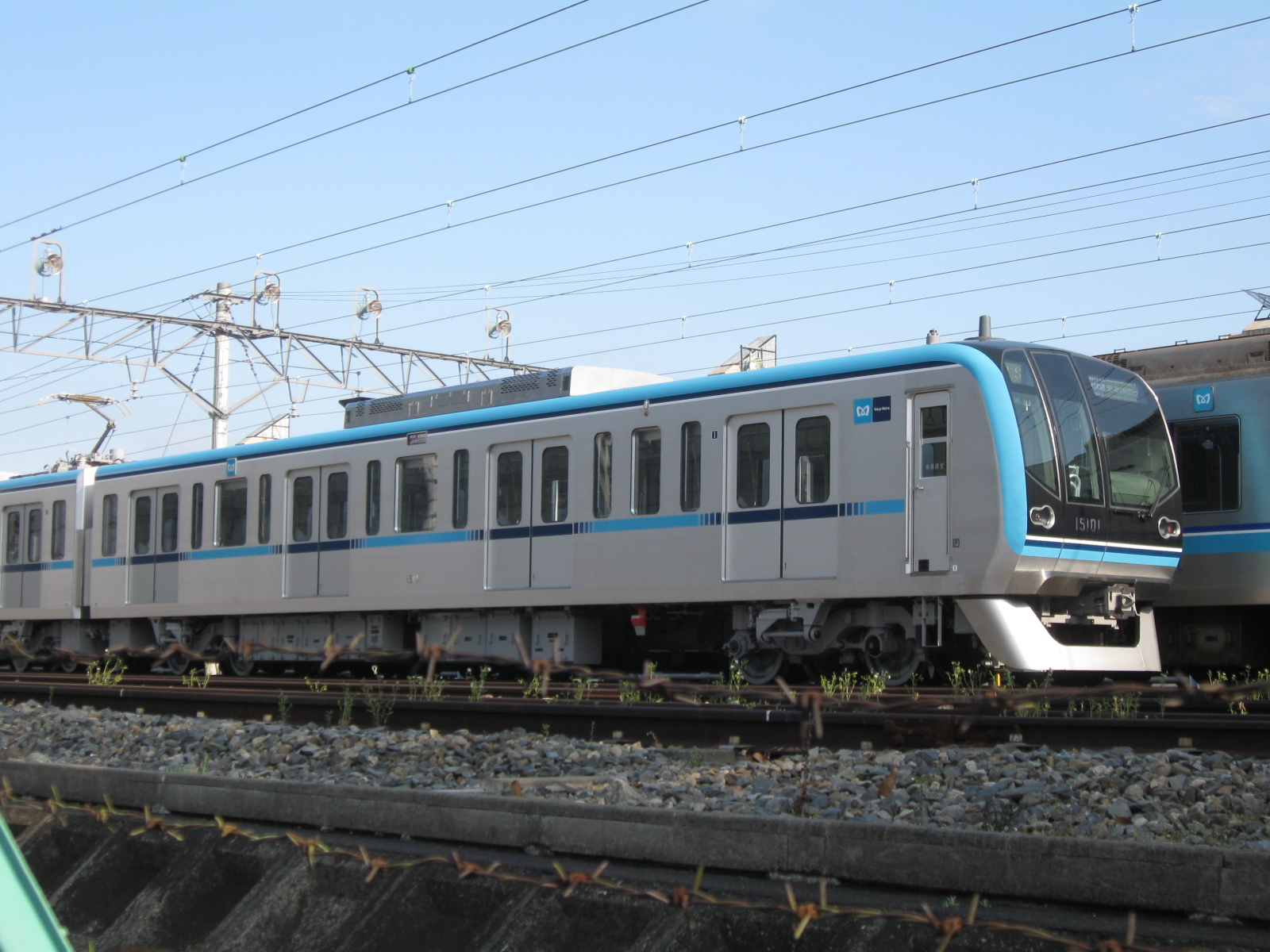
Exterior view at Fukagawa Depot in April 2010

== Operations ==
The 15000 series trains are used on Tokyo Metro Tozai Line inter-running services, to and from Mitaka on the JR East Chuo-Sobu Line in the west, Tōyō-Katsutadai on the Toyo Rapid Railway Line and Tsudanuma on the Chuo-Sobu Line in the east. The 15000 series trains replaced the first batch of the 05 series trains, which have been in service since 1988.

== Formation ==
As of 1 April 2016, the fleet consists of 13 ten-car sets, numbered 51 to 63, and formed as shown below, with car 1 at the Nishi-Funabashi (west) end.

Car No.	1	2	3	4	5	6	7	8	9	10
Designation	CT1	M1'	M2	T	Mc1	Tc	T'	M1	M2'	CT2
Numbering	15100	15200	15300	15400	15500	15600	15700	15800	15900	15000
Capacity	143	155	154						155	143
Weight	26.9 t	33.6 t	34.0 t	24.3 t	32.5 t	24.3 t	24.1 t	33.8 t	33.9 t	26.9 t

Cars 2 and 8 each have two single-arm pantographs. Car 5 has one single-arm pantograph.

== Interior ==
Passenger accommodation consists of longitudinal bench seating throughout, with six-person seats between the doors, and two-person seats at the car ends. Passenger information is provided by pairs of 17-inch LCD information screens above each doorway.

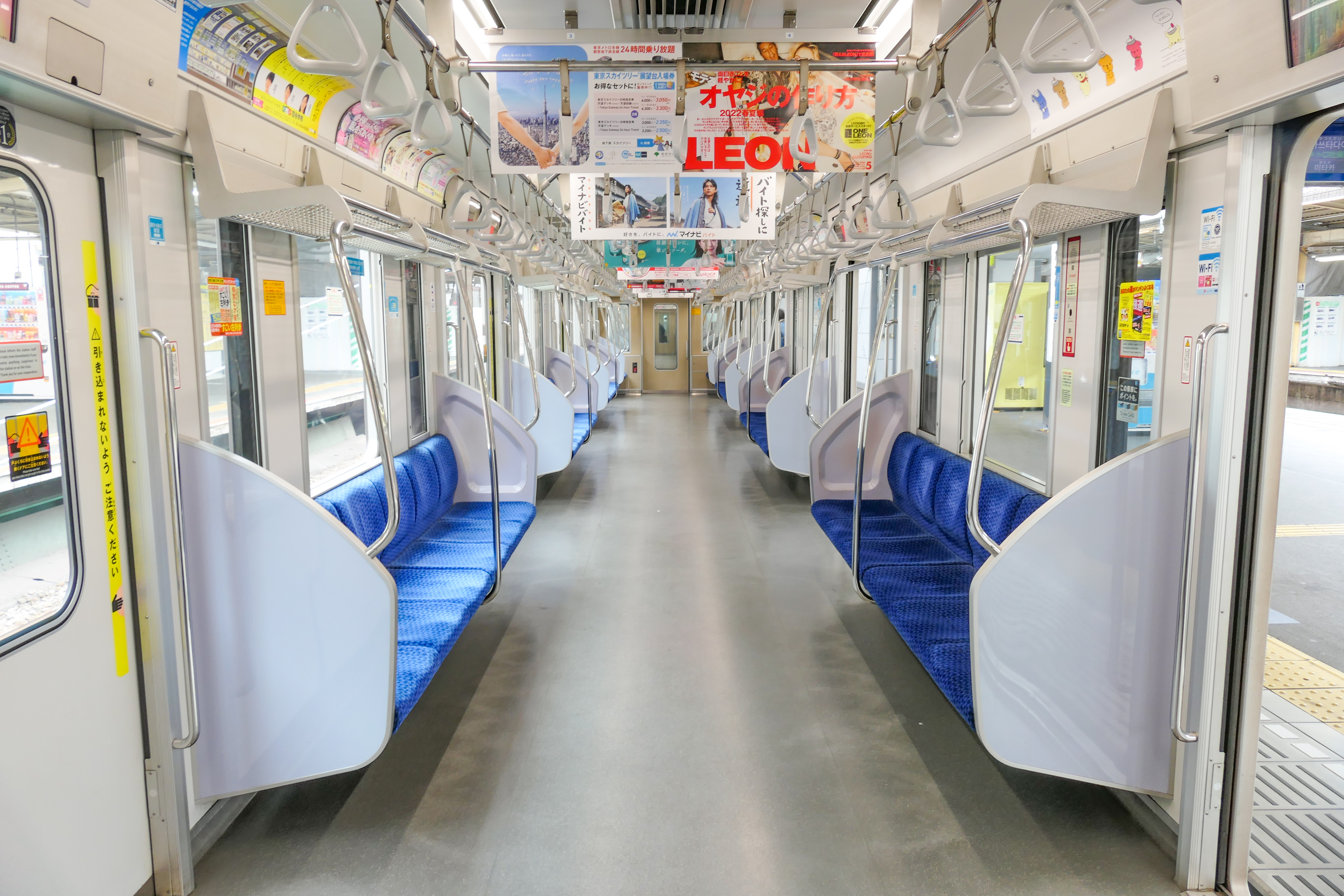
Interior view

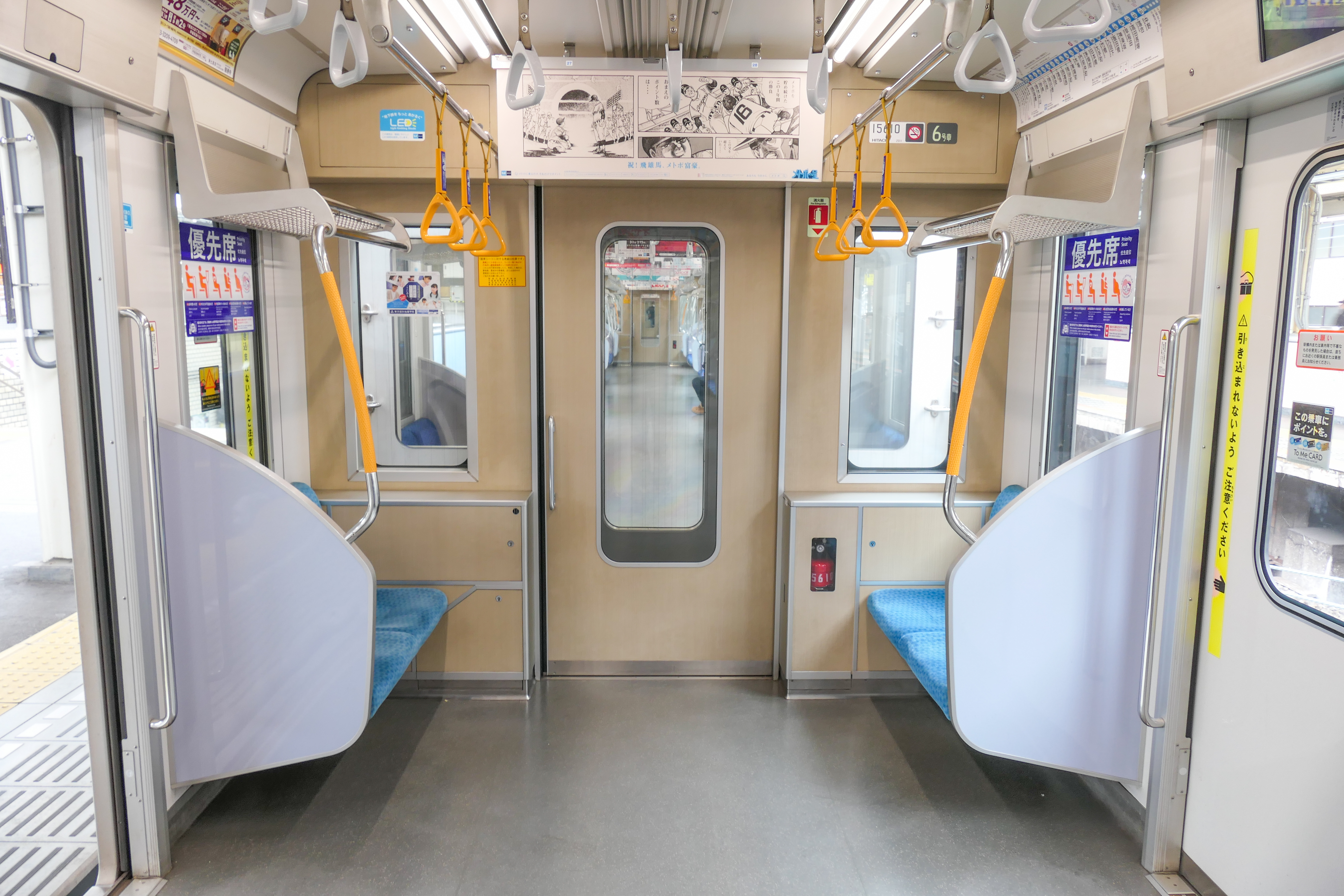
Priority seats

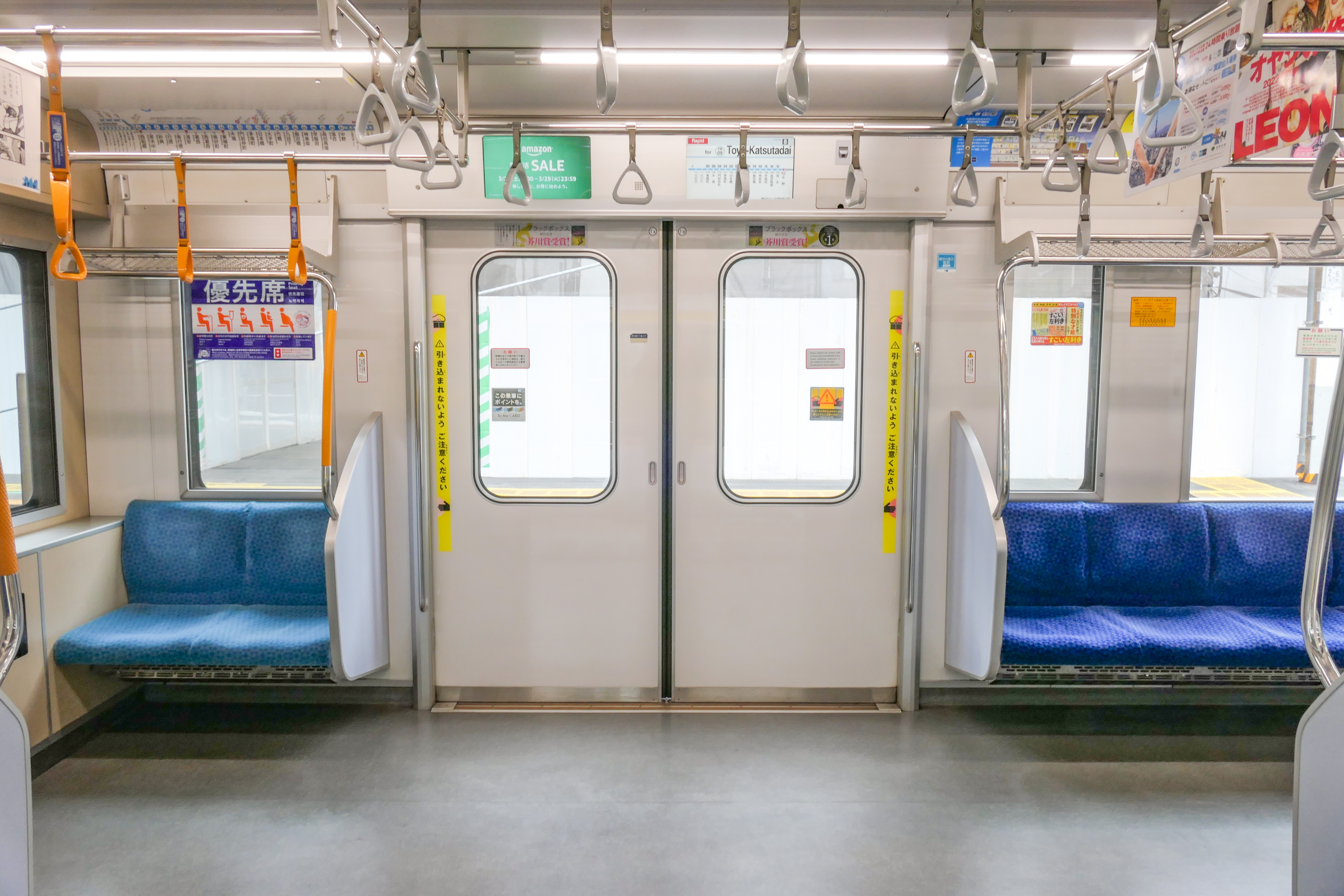
Interior view showing 1,800 mm wide doorway

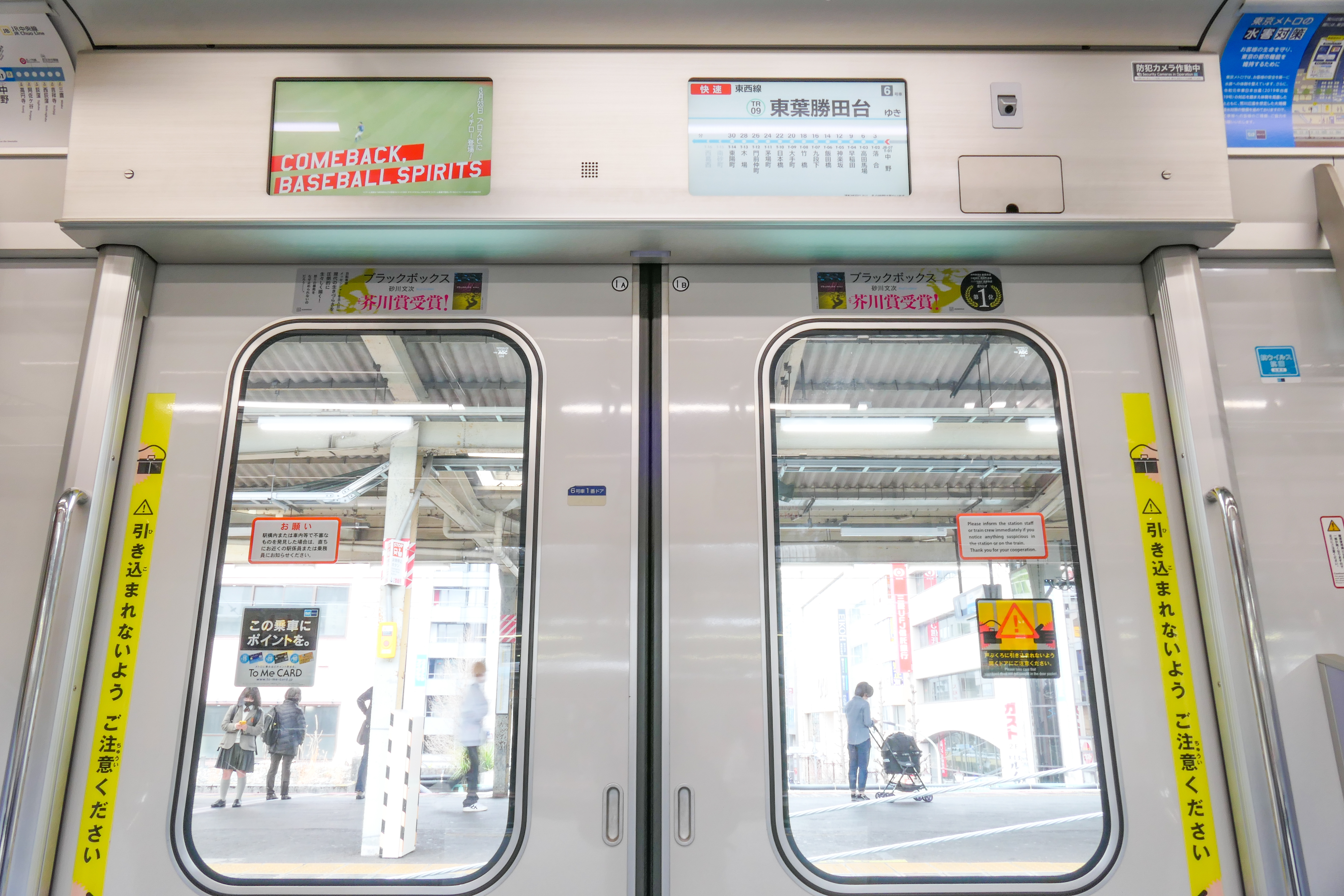
LCD passenger information display

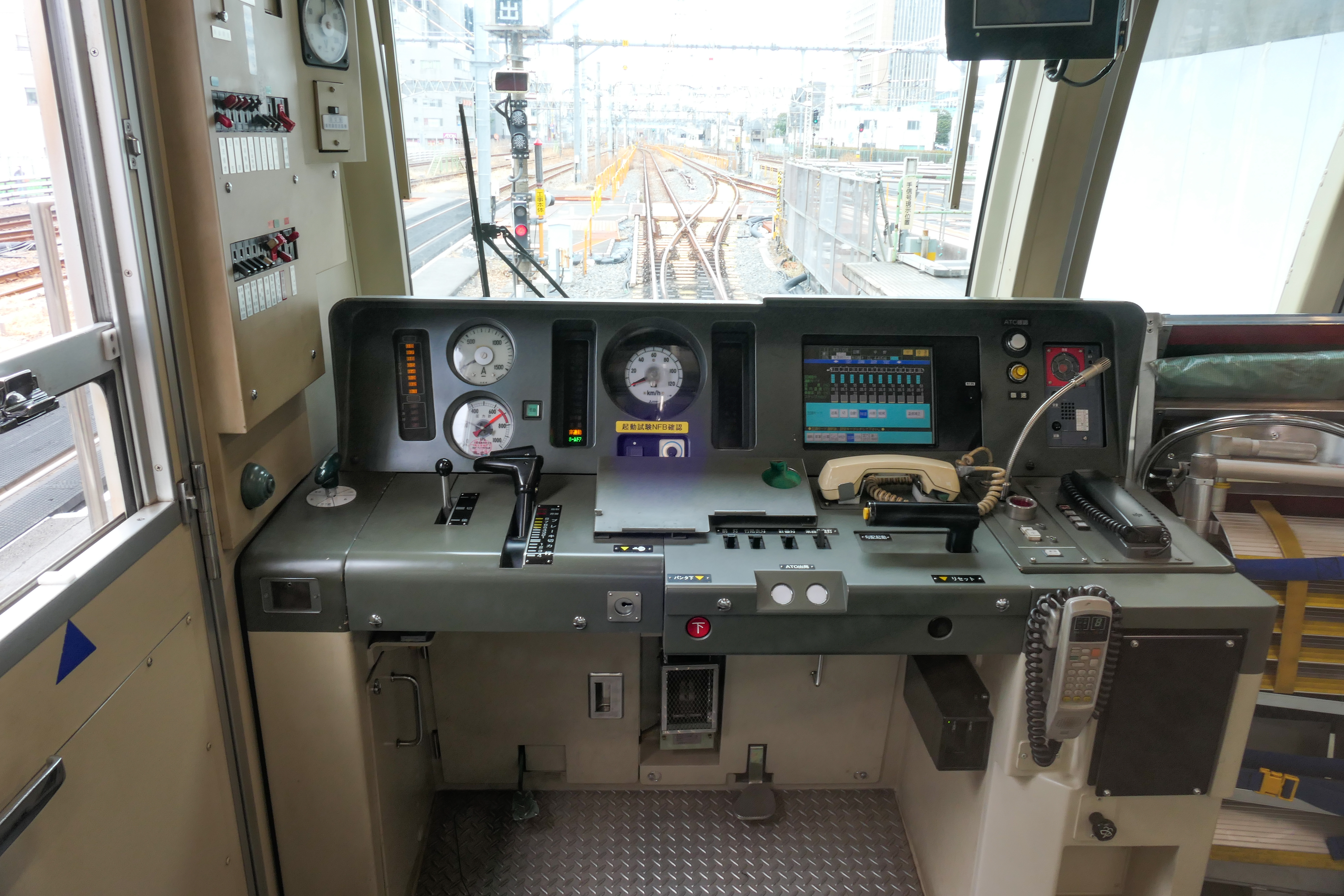
Driver's cab of the 15000 series

== History ==
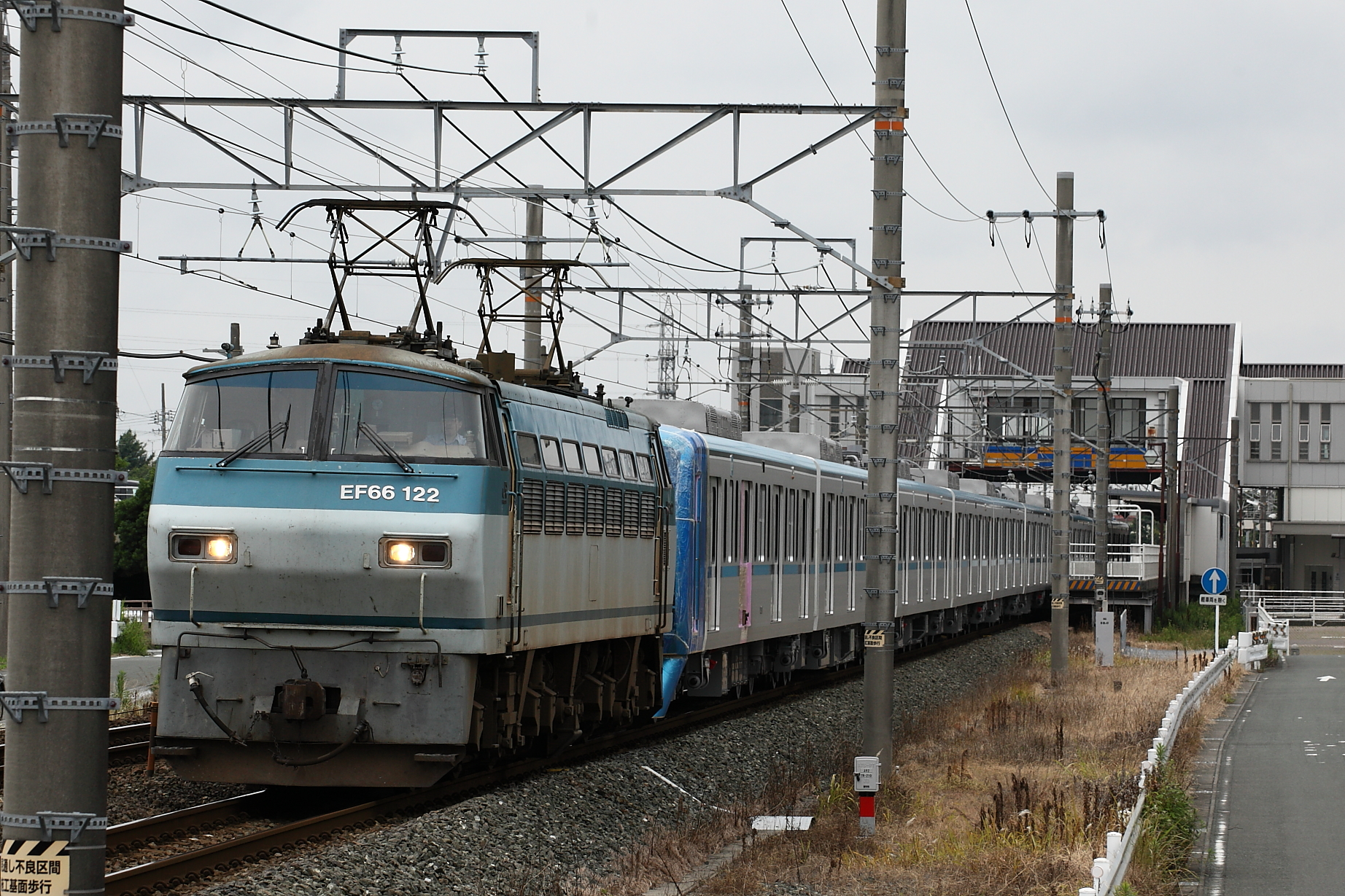
Set 15111 being delivered in June 2011

The first set was delivered from Hitachi's Kudamatsu factory in February 2010.

The first 15000 series sets entered revenue service on 7 May 2010.

Thirteen sets (15101 to 15113) were delivered by 2011, with a further three sets scheduled to be delivered during fiscal 2016.
